= Q-Pop Girl Groups =

- RuPaul's Drag Race episode
- Episode no.: Season 18; Episode 2
- Directed by: Nick Murray
- Presented by: RuPaul
- Original air date: January 9, 2026

Guest appearance
- Dove Cameron (guest judge)

Episode chronology
← Previous "You Can't Keep a Good Drag Queen Down!"	Next → "RDR Live Returns!"
- RuPaul's Drag Race season 18

"Q-Pop Girl Groups" is the second episode of the eighteenth season of the American television series RuPaul's Drag Race. It originally aired on January 9, 2026. The episode's main challenge tasks the contestants with writing and recording original verses and performing choreography in three girl groups. Dove Cameron is a guest judge. Jane Don't wins the main challenge. DD Fuego is eliminated from the competition after placing in the bottom and losing a lip-sync contest against Mandy Mango to "Too Much" by Cameron.

== Episode ==
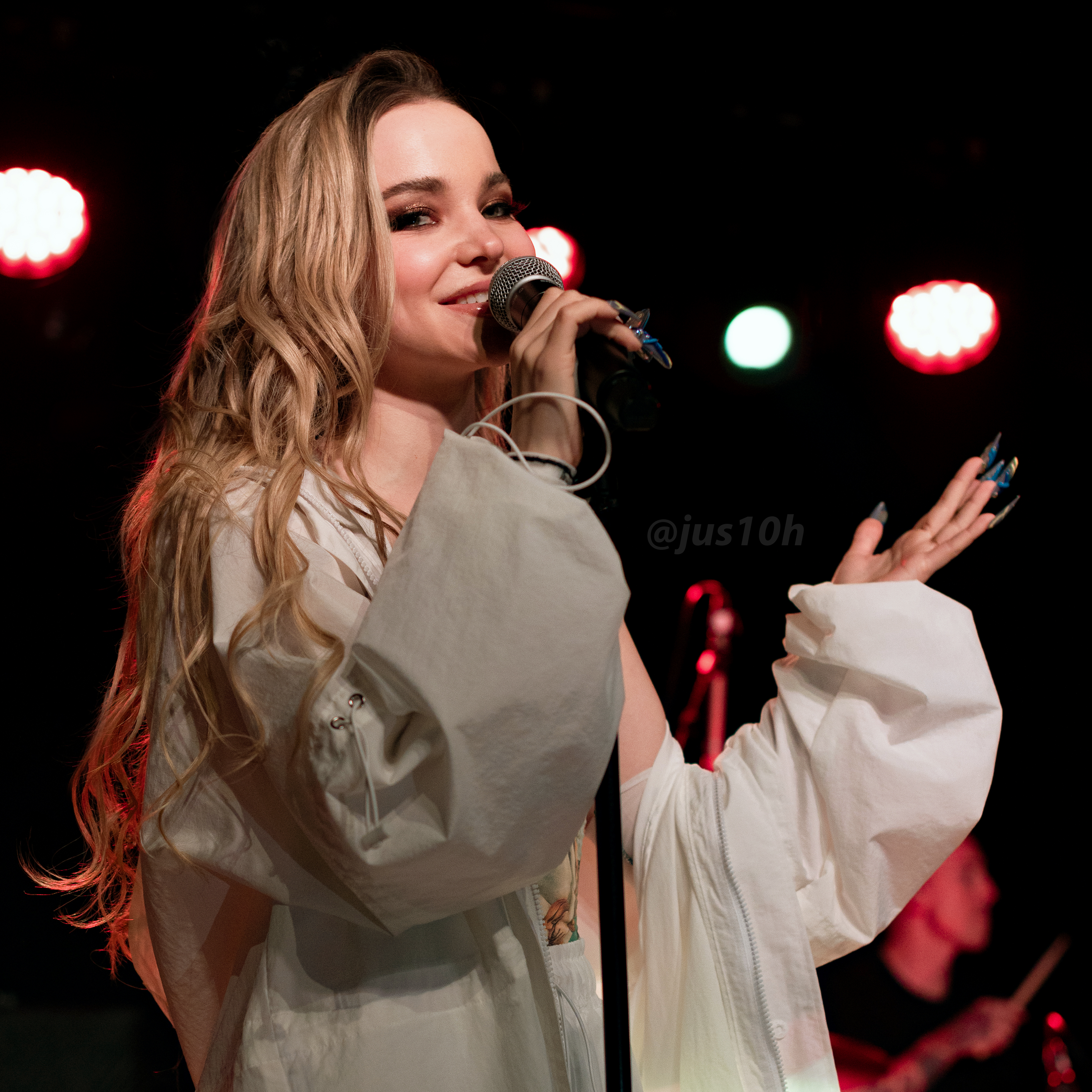
American actress and singer Dove Cameron (pictured in 2021) is a guest judge.

The contestants return to the Werk Room after no one was eliminated on the previous episode. On a new day, RuPaul greets the group and reveals the main challenge, which tasks the contestants with writing and recording original verses and performing choreography in three girl groups. The tracks are "Funk Almighty", a disco song inspired by American singer Sylvester, "Go-Go-Go!", a pop song inspired by the English pop duo Wham!, and "Cherries", a punk rock song inspired by the American band The Runaways. As the winners of the last main challenge, Nini Coco and Vita VonTesse Starr select their fellow group members. The unchosen competitors form the third group. Team Disco ("Studio 50-Whores") includes Athena Dion, DD Fuego, Darlene Mitchell, and Mandy Mango. Team Pop ("Glam!") includes Ciara Myst, Kenya Pleaser, Mia Starr, Myki Meeks, and Nini Coco. Team Punk ("The Tucked Aways") includes Briar Blush, Discord Addams, Jane Don't, Juicy Love Dion, and Vita VonTesse Starr.

The contestants listen to the three tracks, then decide which songs each group will perform. The groups rehearse choreography on the main stage, then record vocals with Michelle Visage as well as composer and producer David Steinberg. Nini Coco struggles with recording her vocals, as she has a hoarse voice from screaming on the previous episode's mini-challenge. On elimination day, the contestants make final preparations for the girl group performances and fashion show. DD Fuego describes her experience being raised in Monterrey. Discord Addams talks about being a member of a punk rock band. Athena Dion talks about not being selected by either captain.

On the main stage, RuPaul welcomes fellow judges Visage and Ts Madison, as well as guest judge Dove Cameron. RuPaul shares the runway category ("Your Neck, Your Back, Your Pussy, and Your Crack"), which tasks the contestants with highlighting their favorite body parts. The three girl groups perform, then the fashion show commences. The judges deliver their critiques, deliberate, then share the results with the group. Jane Don't is declared the winner of the main challenge. DD Fuego and Mandy Mango place in the bottom and face off in a lip-sync contest to "Too Much" (2025) by Cameron. Mandy Mango wins the lip-sync and DD Fuego is eliminated from the competition. DD Fuego returns to the Werk Room and uses lipstick to write a message on the mirror for the remaining contestants.

== Production and broadcast ==
The episode originally aired on January 9, 2026. It was directed by Nick Murray.

=== Fashion ===
For the fashion show, Athena Dion wears a red dress that highlights her back. She also has red gloves and a red wig. Highlighting her skin, Darlene Mitchell wears a look that gives the impression she is sunburned. She has fake hamburgers in her American flag-themed swimsuit, as well as a large blonde wig. Highlighting her face, Mandy Mango wears an outfit that resembles a framed photograph on a table surrounded by knick-knacks. Highlighting her legs, DD Fuego wears a pink leotard and a large boa made of toile. Mia Starr wears a black lace outfit. Her face is covered and she reveals she is highlighting her neck, her back, her crotch ("pussy"), and her buttocks ("crack"). Kenya Pleaser's outfit has a white cape. Highlighting her eyes, Ciara Myst wears a blue dress and a headpiece with two large eyes. Nini Coco wears a structural pink dress and a hat resembling a brain. Highlighting her legs, Myki Meeks carries a billboard with a moving fake leg. Discord Addams wears a black-and-gold outfit and a large dark wig. Vita VonTesse Starr also has a black-and-gold outfit and a large black hat. Brair Blush highlights her finger by wearing a black catsuit and a long red nail. Jane Don't highlights her mouth. Her look resembles a mouth with a long pierced tongue. Her headpiece resembles lipstick. Juicy Love Dion's red dress has a slit and reflective material to highlight her left leg.

== Reception ==
Jason P. Frank of Vulture rated the episode three out of five stars. Kevin O'Keeffe of Xtra Magazine opined, "I’m sad to see a personality like DD go, especially when I thought she had the best verse in her group."

== See also ==
- Girl groups in the Drag Race franchise
