= Kelly Mantle =

American actress, comedian and musician

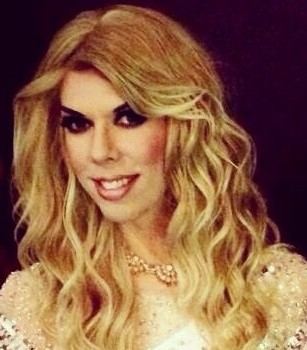
- Mantle in 2014
- Born: Kelly Leroy Mantle; July 9, 1976 (age 50); Oklahoma City, Oklahoma, US
- Education: University of Oklahoma (BFA)
- Occupations: Actor, drag queen, singer-songwriter, musician, comedian
- Years active: 1996–present
- Partner: James Nanney Jr. (2017–present)
- Family: Mickey Mantle (uncle)
- Musical career
- Instruments: Vocals, guitar, drums

Kelly Leroy Mantle (born July 9, 1976) is an American actor, singer-songwriter, comedian, musician, drag queen, and reality television personality. Mantle appeared as a contestant on the sixth season of the reality TV show RuPaul's Drag Race.

== Early life ==
Mantle was born to Larry James and Linda Lea Mantle in Oklahoma City but grew up in New Cordell, Oklahoma. She has a brother, Garrette. She identifies as being of Cherokee descent from Oklahoma.

Mantle's uncle was professional baseball player Mickey Mantle, who played for the New York Yankees. Mantle graduated with a BFA in Theatre from the University of Oklahoma. She is the second Drag Race contestant of Native American descent, following Stacy Layne Matthews of season 3, who is Lumbee. She was followed by Trixie Mattel of season 7 and All Stars 3, who is Ojibwe, and Shuga Cain of season 11, who is Apache.

== Career ==
After college, Mantle went to Chicago to begin a career as an actor. She acted in plays such as The Convention and Royal Flush. Lone Star/Laundry & Bourbon was the first production by OKRA Theatre, a theater company started by Mantle and her friend Tracy Parks, who directed the play.

In 1998, Mantle starred in the Chicago production of Charles Busch's play Vampire Lesbians of Sodom. After two years of living in Chicago, she moved to Los Angeles. She later auditioned for the Los Angeles production of Vampire Lesbians of Sodom, where she was scouted and signed by a talent agent.

In Los Angeles, Mantle became a member of the band Sex with Lurch, which was formed by singer Robbie Quinne and guitarist Bernard Yin. As part of the group, Mantle used the stage name "Brandy Warhol". The group disbanded in December 2002. Mantle later joined Quinne's follow-up band, the Barbarellatones.

Mantle was also a member of the band Tranzkuntinental. The band was started by Charlie Paulson and Xander Smith and features drag queens Detox, Rhea Litré, Vicky Vox, and Willam Belli.

Currently, Mantle is a member of the band the Rollz Royces with Tammie Brown and Michael Catti. Mantle and Catti have appeared in Tammie Brown's Christmas show Holiday Sparkle at Fubar in West Hollywood.

In 2014 Mantle starred in Confessions of a Womanizer with Gary Busey. The film was released in 2016. Mantle, who is genderfluid, made history when the film's producers sought both supporting actor and supporting actress consideration for her performance and The Academy granted the request.

Mantle starred as Sheila on both seasons of the OutTV and Amazon Prime sitcom The Browns alongside Tammie Brown and in 2022 supported Trixie and Katya on their tour Trixie and Katya Live.

=== RuPaul's Drag Race ===
In December 2013, Logo announced that Mantle was among fourteen drag queens who would be competing on the sixth season of RuPaul's Drag Race. She was eliminated in the first episode, lip-synching to "Express Yourself" against Vivacious.

=== The Kelly Mantle Show ===
On December 11, 2024, the first episode of Mantle's podcast The Kelly Mantle Show, executive produced by Trixie and Katya and hosted on the Studio71 network, was released.

No.	Title	Original release date
1	"Tammie Brown Spins Kelly's Head Round and Round"	December 11, 2024
2	"Coco Peru Is Booked & Busy & Bothered"	December 18, 2024
3	"Angeria Paris VanMicheals Serves Sweet Southern Tea"	January 1, 2025
4	"Tammie Brown Takes Us Down to Funkytown"	January 8, 2025
5	"Mystic & Mediums with Vicky Vox & Cheri Mancuso"	January 15, 2025
6	"Katya, Kelly, and Cockroaches Have a Kiki"	January 22, 2025
7	"Tammie Brown Is Back Again! Please Send Help!"	January 29, 2025
8	"Viral Sensation: Brendan Jordan! Like You've Never Seen Her Before!"	February 5, 2025
9	"Jinkx Monsoon Makes Kelly Mantle Swoon"	February 12, 2025
10	"Meatball and Kelly Mantle Get Kicked Out of the Party!"	February 19, 2025
11	"Tammie Brown Tries to Take Down The Kelly Mantle Show"	February 26, 2025
12	"Raja Toots The Kelly Mantle Show!"	March 5, 2025
13	"Laganja Estranja Opens Up More than Her Legs on The Kelly Mantle Show"	March 12, 2025
14	"Latrice Royale Reveals All on The Kelly Mantle Show!"	March 19, 2025
15	"Tammie Brown Reveals More Unsolved Mysteries on The Kelly Mantle Show!"	March 26, 2025
16	"Plasma and Kelly Mantle Get Tipsy on Trixie!"	April 2, 2025
17	"Willam Rocks The Kelly Mantle Show!"	April 9, 2025
18	"Heidi N Closet Leaves Kelly Mantle Gooped and Gapped!"	April 16, 2025
19	"Tammie Brown Has a Breakdown on The Kelly Mantle Show"	April 23, 2025
20	"Pop Culture Anthropologist Blakely Thornton Dishes on a Poutpourri of Hot Topics with Kelly Mantle"	April 30, 2025
21	"Jackie Beat and Sherry Vine Drop a Hot Steamy Bombshell on The Kelly Mantle Show"	May 7, 2025
22	"Bob the Drag Queen Gets into the Groove on The Kelly Mantle Show"	May 14, 2025
23	"Bob the Drag Queen on The Kelly Mantle Show: The Sequel"	May 21, 2025
24	"Alien Queen Juno Birch Abducts Kelly Mantle!"	May 28, 2025
25	"Alaska Sends Kelly Mantle $10,000 on The Kelly Mantle Show!"	June 4, 2025
26	"Sasha Colby. Period. On The Kelly Mantle Show!"	June 11, 2025
27	"Margaret Cho Is Live & Livid on The Kelly Mantle Show!"	June 18, 2025
28	"Plane Jane, Kudos for Saying That, for Spilling on The Kelly Mantle Show!"	June 25, 2025
29	"Plane Jane & Kelly Mantle: Part 2—Fasten Your Seatbelts!"	July 2, 2025
30	"Kelly Mantle Responds to Your Q&A's for the Super Cool Crazy Extreme Birthday Episode!"	July 9, 2025
31	"Sapphira Cristál Spills All on The Kelly Mantle Show!"	July 16, 2025
32	"Cynthia Lee Fontaine RuVeals Cucu Confessions about Drag Race All Stars 10 on The Kelly Mantle Show!"	July 23, 2025
33	"Monét X Change and Kelly Mantle Dismantle the Drama!"	July 30, 2025
34	"Jimbo Brings the Circus to The Kelly Mantle Show!"	August 6, 2025
35	"Teen Vogue Covergirl, Vivian Wilson, Takes Over The Kelly Mantle Show!"	August 13, 2025
36	"Vanjie Spills the Tea-quila on The Kelly Mantle Show!"	August 20, 2025
37	"Bosco Gets Whammed Up on The Kelly Mantle Show!"	August 27, 2025
38	"Miss Benny and Buddy Keaton Take Us to Church on The Kelly Mantle Show!"	September 3, 2025
39	"Ding! Jewels Sparkles! Ding! On The Kelly Mantle Show! Ding!"	September 10, 2025
40	"The IMHO Kelly Mantle Show! (with Darby and Alexis)"	September 17, 2025
41	"Kori King Wakes Up the Big One on The Kelly Mantle Show!"	September 24, 2025
42	"Kori King and Kelly Mantle Pt 2: Into the Kori-Verse"	October 1, 2025
43	"Tayce Goes Face to Face with Kelly Mantle!"	October 8, 2025
44	"Nicole Byer and Sasheer Zamata BFF'ing on The Kelly Mantle Show!"	October 15, 2025
45	"Lushious Massacr Dravgestigates the Transvestigation Unit on The Kelly Mantle Show!"	October 22, 2025
46	"Luenell (The Original Bad Girl of Comedy) on The Kelly Mantle Show!"	October 29, 2025
47	"Trixie Mattel and Kelly Mantle Get Woo Woo on The Kelly Mantle Show!"	November 5, 2025
48	"Trixie Mattel and Kelly Mantle Part 2: The Book of RuVelations!"	November 12, 2025
49	"Miles Heizer Serves the House Down BOOTS on The Kelly Mantle Show!"	November 19, 2025
50	"Alaska and Kelly Mantle Are Here to Slay the Holidays!"	November 26, 2025
51	"Nicole Paige Brooks Gets Rah Rah on The Kelly Mantle Show!"	December 3, 2025
52	"Jasmine Masters Has Something to Say on The Kelly Mantle Show!"	December 10, 2025
53	"Trixie Mattel, Nicole Paige Brooks, Jasmine Masters, & RPDR_NoLimbs Celebrate Our 1 Year Anniversary"	December 17, 2025
54	"Ginger Minj Gets Wicked on The Kelly Mantle Show!"	December 24, 2025
55	"The Kelly Mantle Show's Favorite Moments of 2025 & Happy New Year!"	December 31, 2025
56	"Ginger Minj on The Kelly Mantle Show: Part 2 the Sequel!"	January 7, 2026
57	"Kim Chi Serenades The Kelly Mantle Show!"	January 14, 2026
58	"Farrah Moan Stuns The Kelly Mantle Show!"	January 21, 2026
59	"Naysha Lopez Keeps It Real on The Kelly Mantle Show!"	January 28, 2026
60	"Amanda Tori Meating Now in Session on The Kelly Mantle Show!"	February 4, 2026
61	"Eureka O'Hara: The Tell-All Interview on The Kelly Mantle Show!"	February 11, 2026
62	"Kylie Sonique Love Shows Us What She's Got on The Kelly Mantle Show!"	February 18, 2026
63	"Scarlet Envy Is the Drama on The Kelly Mantle Show!"	February 25, 2026
64	"Suzie Toot as Tootsie Scooter on The Kelly Mantle Show!"	March 4, 2026
65	"The Suzie Toot and Kelly Mantle Show Act 2!"	March 11, 2026
66	"Lady Bunny Wigs Out on The Kelly Mantle Show!"	March 18, 2026
67	"Valentina Transforms Fantasy into Reality on The Kelly Mantle Show!"	March 25, 2026
68	"Trinity the Tuck Tea Spill Spectacular on The Kelly Mantle Show!"	April 1, 2026
69	"Mrs. Kasha Davis Always Has Time for a Breakdown on The Kelly Mantle Show!"	April 8, 2026
70	"Daya Betty and Acid Betty Are Pretty and Petty on The Kelly Mantle Show!"	April 15, 2026
71	"¡Escándalo! Jessica Wild Is on The Kelly Mantle Show!"	April 22, 2026
72	"Detox Is Burning Up The Kelly Mantle Show!"	April 29, 2026
73	"Cosmo Queen of Melrose Puts the Fun in Disfunction on The Kelly Mantle Show!"	May 6, 2026
74	"Courtney Act Is Blocked, Booked, and Busy on The Kelly Mantle Show!"	May 13, 2026
75	"Juno Birch Returns in Human Form to The Kelly Mantle Show!"	May 20, 2026
76	"Tammie Brown Is Back to Attack Kelly Mantle!"	May 27, 2026
77	"Sarah Sherman Makes Kelly Mantle Squirm!"	June 3, 2026
78	"IMHO's Darby and Alexis Confront Kelly Mantle!"	June 10, 2026
79	"Roz Hernandez Roasts and Ghosts Kelly Mantle!"	June 17, 2026
80	"Discord Addams Rocks Out on The Kelly Mantle Show!"	June 24, 2026
81	"Salina EsTitties Spills Drag Race All Stars Tea on The Kelly Mantle Show!"	July 1, 2026
82	"Lydia B Kollins Gets Spooky on The Kelly Mantle Show!"	July 8, 2026
83	"Darlene Mitchell Is Cookin' with Gas on The Kelly Mantle Show!"	July 15, 2026
84	"Onya Nurve Came to Serve on The Kelly Mantle Show!"	July 22, 2026
85	"Jasmine Kennedie Spills and RuVeals Drag Race All Stars Tea!"	July 29, 2026
86	"Tammie Brown Is Back Again and Things Get Unhinged on The Kelly Mantle Show!"	August 5, 2026
87	"Detox and Kelly Mantle Got Something They Wanna Talk About!"	August 12, 2026
88	"Crystal Methyd Comes Out as a Lipstick Thespian on The Kelly Mantle Show!"	August 19, 2026
89	"Myki Meeks Makes Her First Podcast Appearance on The Kelly Mantle Show!"	August 26, 2026
90	"Candis Cayne: The Icon on The Kelly Mantle Show!"	September 2, 2026
91	"Mia Starr Dishes on Drag Race and Pop Stars on The Kelly Mantle Show!"	September 9, 2026
92	"Meatball Issues a Public Apology on The Kelly Mantle Show!"	September 16, 2026
93	"Dawn Gets Arrested on The Kelly Mantle Show!"	September 23, 2026
94	"Jan Sport Sings Live and Spills Tea on The Kelly Mantle Shiw!"	September 30, 2026

== Personal life ==
Mantle has been dating USMC veteran James Nanney Jr. since around 2017. For their first date, he invited her to a marine ball in Albany, Georgia, where he was stationed.

== Discography ==
=== Albums ===
- Ever Changing (2002)
- Rock-N-Glow (2004)
- Satellite Baby (2006)
- Bone Waters (2022)

=== Singles ===
Song	Year	Album
"My Neck, My Back (Lick It)"	2013	Non-album single
"Main Event"	2014	RuPaul Presents: The Covergurlz
"Eliminated" (featuring Bownce and Wendy Ho)	2014	Non-album singles
"Keyboard Courage"	2015	Non-album singles

=== Music videos ===
Song	Year	Director
"Satellite Baby"	2007	—N/a
"My Neck, My Back (Lick It)"	2013	Andrew Putschoegl
"Main Event"	2014	—N/a
"Eliminated"	2014	Kija Manharé
"Keyboard Courage"	2015	Gordon Cowie

== Filmography ==
=== Film ===
Year	Title	Role	Notes
2000	The Convent	Dickie-Boy	
2000	True Rights	Cleo	
2000	Super Duper	Maddie	Short film
2002	Superfag	Apacalipstick	Short film
2004	Straight Eye: The Movie	Herself	Short film
2004	Buds for Life	Sierra Bonita	
2006	The Boys & Girls Guide to Getting Down	Drag Queen	
2013	American Dream	Katrina	
2013	Confessions of a Womanizer	Ginger	
2017	The Evil Within	Drag Queen at Bookstore Cafe	
2021	The Bitch Who Stole Christmas	Wistful Woman/Madelyn	
2022	Marmalade	Lewis/Marmalade	Short Film
2022	God Save the Queens	Lewis/Marmalade	

=== Television ===
Year	Title	Role	Notes
1999	Undressed	Howie	Episode: "Love It or Leave It Again"
2003	NYPD Blue	Dan "Monika" Hoffnagle	2 episodes
2003	Nip/Tuck	Transgender Woman No. 2	Episode: "Sofia Lorez Part II"
2003	10-8: Officers on Duty	Raven	Episode: "Badlands"
2003	Cold Case	Drag Performer No. 2	Episode: "A Time to Hate"
2003	Just Shoot Me!	Robert 'Nina Man Horn'	Episode: "The Goodbye Girl"
2004	CSI: Crime Scene Investigation	Bartender	Episode: "Ch-Ch-Changes"
2004	Judging Amy	Velvet	Episode: "Order and Chaos"
2005	George Lopez	Deep Voice Singer	Episode: "George Buys a Vow"
2005	Eve	Rudy	Episode: "Moral Minority"
2005	Cuts	Peter	Episode: "Strictly Bizz-Nass"
2008	The New Adventures of Old Christine	Sparkle	Episode: "Happy Endings"
2009	Southland	Lacey	Episode: "See the Woman"
2011	One Night Stand Up	Herself	Episode: "Dragtastic NYC"
2011	Mike & Molly	Steven	Episode: "Joyce & Vince And Peaches & Herb"
2011	Curb Your Enthusiasm	Kelly	Episode: "Palestinian Chicken"
2012	Eagleheart	'Maph	Episode: "Little Dude"
2012	Rizzoli & Isles	Kitty	Episode: "Melt My Heart to Stone"
2012	The New Normal	Aubrey	Episode: "Pilot"
2014	RuPaul's Drag Race	Herself	Season 6; 13th/14th place (2 episodes)
2014	RuPaul's Drag Race: Untucked	Herself	1 episode
2016	Gay for Play Game Show Starring RuPaul	Herself	1 episode
2016	RuPaul's Drag Race All Stars	Herself	Episode: "Revenge of the Queens"
2018	Lucifer	Donovan McCann / Cher	Episode: "Let Pinhead Sing!"
2019	Modern Family	Drag Queen	Episode: "The Last Halloween"
2020–21	The Browns	Sheila	8 episodes
2025	Drag House Rules	Writer	Episode: "The Ghost & the Ganja"
2026	Sisters	God	Episode: "She of Little Faith"

=== Web series ===
Year	Title	Role	Notes	Ref.
2013	Love On-The-Line	Herself	Season 1, Episode 9: "The Meet-Cute Part II"	
2020	Queen With a Cause	Herself	Episode: "Palm Oil"	
2023	Bodyody of Work	Herself	Episode: "Kelly Mantle Breaks Down Her Acting Career"	

=== Podcasts ===
Year	Title	Role	Ref.
2021	Exposed: Dragged Out	Guest	
2021-2022	Race Chaser	Guest	
2021	Ebony and Irony	Guest	
2022	Sloppy Seconds	Guest	
2022-2025	The Bald and the Beautiful	Guest	
2023	Very Delta	Guest	
2024-present	The Kelly Mantle Show	Host	

== Theatre ==
Year	Title	Role	Theatre
1994	Eastern Standard	Peter Kidde	Rupel Jones Theatre
1994	Red Scare on Sunset	Malcolm	Sooner Theatre
1994	The Foreigner	Ellard Simms	Rupel Jones Theatre
1994	Holdenville		Rupel Jones Theatre
1995	The Nerd	Willum Cubbert	Weitzenhoffer Theatre
1995	Lysistrata		Weitzenhoffer Theatre
1996	The Convention	Sammy Wilcox	The Comedy Asylum
1997	Royal Flush	Camille	Athenaeum Theatre
1997	Lone Star/Laundry & Bourbon	Ray/Hattie	OKRA Theatre
1998	Four Dogs and a Bone	Victor	Cafe Voltaire
1998	Vampire Lesbians of Sodom	Madeleine	Aaah! Capella Theatre Cafe
2004	Dear Bernard	Jon Meshelle	Court Theatre
2006	Last Easter	Gash	Laguna Playhouse
2007	All This, And Heaven Too	Jo	Macha Theatre
2008	The Facts of Life: The Lost Episode	Blair Warner	Macha Theatre
2010	The Confusion of My Illusion	One-person show	Los Angeles Gay and Lesbian Center
2010	Love, Connie	Bambi	Cavern Club
2011	Hollywood Dream Role		ACME Comedy Theatre
2011	Charlie! The Death of Nancy Fullforce	Kitty Glitter	Art/Works Theatre
2012	Valley of the Dolls		Sacred Fools Theater Company

== Awards and nominations ==
Year	Award	Category	Nominee(s)	Result	Ref
2026	Queerty Awards	Podcast	The Kelly Mantle Show	Won	
