= Jane Don't =

American entertainer

- Born: Sam Chapman; March 16, 1993 (age 33); Spokane, Washington
- Occupations: Drag performer; dancer; choreographer
- Television: RuPaul's Drag Race (season 18)
- Title: Miss Congeniality
- Predecessor: Crystal Envy
- Website: heyjanedont.com

Sam Chapman (born March 16, 1993), professionally known as Jane Don't, is an American drag performer, comedian, and singer who won the title of Miss Congeniality on the eighteenth season of RuPaul's Drag Race.

== Career ==
Chapman is originally from Spokane, Washington, and now resides in Seattle. Chapman found a love for drag performance after seeing local queens in Spokane, and watching RuPaul's Drag Race in high school. Chapman attended Pacific Lutheran University, acquiring a degree in musical theater, though initially studying voice. Chapman worked as a barista and in live entertainment management, before returning to drag in 2020.

Chapman's drag persona is Jane Don't. In December 2025, it was announced that Jane Don't would join the cast of RuPaul's Drag Race season 18. She attributed her win of the Rusical of Fannie: The Hard Knock Ball Rusical to her musical theatre training. After reaching 5th place, Jane Don't was controversially eliminated. Out called it "an elimination nobody saw coming". Jane Don’t was voted Miss Congeniality by her fellow cast mates. In May 2026, Jane Don't announced she was going on the Don't Does America tour the following fall.

== Filmography ==
=== Television ===
Year	Title	Role	Notes
2026	RuPaul's Drag Race (season 18)	Contestant	5th place
2026	RuPaul's Drag Race: Untucked (season 17)	Herself	13 episodes

=== Web series ===
Title	Year	Role	Notes
Drag Queens Decide Who Wins $1000	2019	Herself	
Whatcha Packin'	2026	Herself	Season 18, Episode 9
Hello Hello Hello	2026	Herself	Season 2, Episode 10

== Discography ==
All credits adapted from Apple Music and Spotify.

=== As lead artist ===
==== Singles ====
Year	Title	Album	Writer(s)	Producer(s)
2023	"Pass the Light"	Non-album single	Pat King	Pat King, KEnzo Divic, Luke Armentrout

== Tours ==
=== Don't Does America ===
==== Background ====
In May 2026, Jane Don't announced her one-woman show Don't Does America on The Stranger. The tour spans August through October 2026.

==== Tour dates ====
Date	City	Venue
August 31, 2026	Seattle, Washington	Emerald City Comedy Club
September 2, 2026	Seattle, Washington	Emerald City Comedy Club
September 3, 2026	Irvine, California	Irvine Improv
September 4, 2026	San Jose, California	San Jose Improv
September 5, 2026	Los Angeles, California	Dynasty Typewriter at the Hayworth Theatre
September 6, 2026	Phoenix, Arizona	Stand Up Live
September 6, 2026	Denver, Colorado	Denver Improv
September 8, 2026	Nashville, Tennessee	City Winery
September 9, 2026	Schaumburg, Illinois	Chicago Improv
September 10, 2026	West Des Moines, Iowa	Des Moines Funny Bone
September 11, 2026	Saint Paul, Minnesota	Amsterdam Bar & Hall
September 13, 2026	Milwaukee, Wisconsin	Milwaukee Improv
September 15, 2026	Birmingham, Alabama	Stardome Comedy Club
September 16, 2026	Buffalo, New York	Helium Comedy Club
September 17, 2026	Boston, Massachusetts	Laugh Boston
September 18, 2026	Asbury Park, New Jersey	House of Independents
September 20, 2026	Nyack, New York	West Nyack Levity Live
September 21, 2026	New York, New York	City Winery New York City
September 22, 2026	Hartford, Connecticut	Funny Bone Comedy Club
September 23, 2026	Albany, New York	Albany Funny Bone
September 24, 2026	Syracuse, New York	Syracuse Funny Bone
September 25, 2026	Philadelphia, Pennsylvania	City Winery
September 27, 2026	Richmond, Virginia	Funny Bone Comedy Club
September 29, 2026	Austin, Texas	Cap City Comedy Club
September 30, 2026	Dallas, Texas	Addison Improv Comedy Club
October 1, 2026	Tampa, Florida	Funny Bone Comedy Club
October 3, 2026	Fort Lauderdale, Florida	Fort Lauderdale Improv
October 4, 2026	Raleigh, North Carolina	Raleigh Improv
October 6, 2026	Washington, D.C.	DC Improv Comedy Club
October 7, 2026	Pittsburgh, Pennsylvania	Pittsburgh Improv
October 14, 2026	Atlanta, Georgia	City Winery
October 15, 2026	Orlando, Florida	Funny Bone Comedy Club
