= Fannie: The Hard Knock Ball Rusical =

- RuPaul's Drag Race episode
- Episode no.: Season 18; Episode 9
- Directed by: Nick Murray
- Presented by: RuPaul
- Original air date: February 27, 2025

Guest appearances
- Benny Blanco (guest judge); Leland; Gabe Lopez; Jamal Sims

Episode chronology
← Previous "Snatch Game of Love: Island Edition"	Next → "Drag In a Bag"
- RuPaul's Drag Race season 18

"Fannie: The Hard Knock Ball Rusical" is the ninth episode of the eighteenth season of the American reality competition television series RuPaul's Drag Race, and the 247th episode overall. The episode first aired for the cable network MTV on February 27, 2026. Its main challenge tasks the contestants with performing in a Rusical (musical theatre production) inspired by Annie, influenced with the Ballroom scene and heavily incorporates voguing as their choreography. An episode was then followed from its companion series RuPaul's Drag Race: Untucked.

Special guest appearances were made from Leland, songwriter Gabe Lopez, and Carlos Basquiat. American record producer Benny Blanco is the guest judge, who appears alongside the regular panelists RuPaul, Michelle Visage, and Jamal Sims. Jane Don't wins the main challenge. Athena Dion is eliminated from the competition after placing in the bottom and losing a lip-sync contest against Juicy Love Dion to Blanco's song "Call Me When You Break Up" (2025) with Selena Gomez and Gracie Abrams.

According to Nielsen Media Research (NMR), nearly 493,000 household viewers saw the episode, which gained a 0.19 ratings share among adults aged 18–49.

== Episode ==
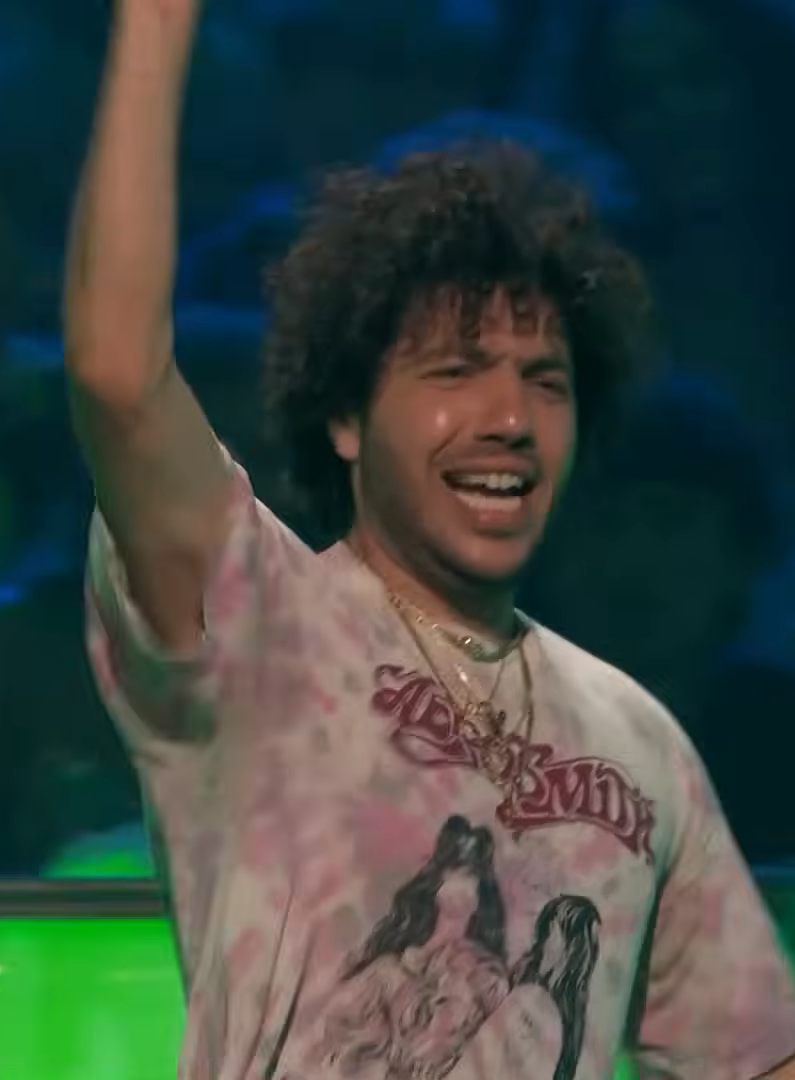
Benny Blanco (pictured in 2025) is a guest judge.

After the elimination of Mia Starr, the remaining contestants returns to the workroom and discussed their previous critiques from the guest judges based on the Snatch Game. Juicy Love Dion then opened up about her drug addiction and recovering from it.

Athena Dion and Juicy Love Dion were revealed to be in the bottom two and face-off in a lip-sync contest to Blanco's song "Call Me When You Break Up" (2025) with Selena Gomez and Gracie Abrams. Athena Dion is eliminated from the competition and returns to the workroom, leaving a mirror message using lipstick for the remaining contestants.

== Production and broadcast ==
The episode originally aired on February 27, 2026.

Lopez died a month before the episode aired.

== Reception ==
Jason P. Frank of Vulture rated the episode four out of five stars. Michael Cook of Werrrk described the lip-sync contest as "arguably one of the most emotional lip syncs of the Drag Race franchise".
