= You Can't Keep a Good Drag Queen Down! =

- RuPaul's Drag Race episode
- Episode no.: Season 18; Episode 1
- Presented by: RuPaul
- Original air date: January 2, 2026

Guest appearances
- Cardi B (guest judge); Bob the Drag Queen; Kim Chi; Raja; Jamal Sims; Tokyo Stylez; Erika La' Pearl

Episode chronology
← Previous "Grand Finale"	Next → "Q-Pop Girl Groups"
- RuPaul's Drag Race season 18

"You Can't Keep a Good Drag Queen Down!" is the first episode of the eighteenth season of the American television series RuPaul's Drag Race. It originally aired on January 2, 2026. The episode's main challenge tasks contestants with creating original looks using materials from the Drag Race vault. Cardi B is a guest judge. Former competitors Bob the Drag Queen, Kim Chi, and Raja also make guest appearances, along with Jamal Sims, Tokyo Stylez, and Erika La' Pearl. Nini Coco wins the episode's main challenge, after placing in the top and defeating Vita VonTesse Starr a lip-sync contest to "Enough (Miami)" (2024) by Cardi B. No contestants are eliminated from the competition.

== Episode ==
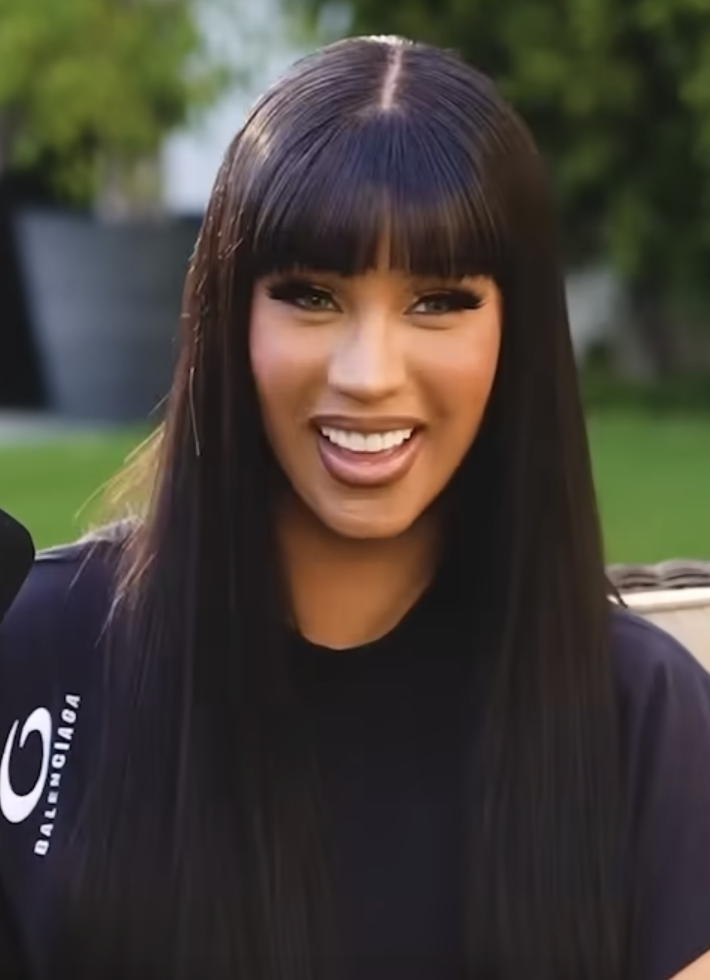
Cardi B (pictured in 2024) is a guest judge.

The episode starts with former competitors Bob the Drag Queen, Kim Chi, and Raja peddling on stationary bicycles to "fuel" the "Drag Race Generator". Fourteen new contestants enter the Werk Room one at a time. RuPaul greets the group and reveals the first mini-challenge, which tasks the contestants with screaming during photo shoots with Jamal Sims as well as masked dancers. As photo shoots end, the contestants return to the Werk Room and get out of drag. RuPaul returns and declares Kenya Pleaser as the winner of the mini-challenge, earning her a cash prize of $2,500. RuPaul then introduces the main challenge, which tasks the contestants with creating original looks using materials from the Drag Race vault. He also reveals that Cardi B is the guest judge.

The contestants gather materials, then begin to create their outfits. On elimination day, the contestants make final preparations for the fashion show. Athena Dion discusses working in Mykonos and being heard in a viral video featuring Lindsay Lohan. On the main stage, RuPaul welcomes fellow judges Michelle Visage and Carson Kressley, as well as Cardi B. The fashion show commences and the runway category is "Reclaim, Renew, Rejoice". The judges deliver their critiques, deliberate, then share the results with the group. While waiting, the contestants receive a visit from Cardi B, Erika La' Pearl, and Tokyo Stylez. RuPaul shares that Kenya Pleaser and Mandy Mango placed in the bottom, but that no contestants will be eliminated this week. Nini Coco and Vita VonTesse Starr are deemed the top two contestants. The two face off in a lip-sync contest to "Enough (Miami)" (2024) by Cardi B. Nini Coco defeats Vita VonTesse Starr, making her the winner of the main challenge and earning her a cash prize of $5,000.

== Production and broadcast ==
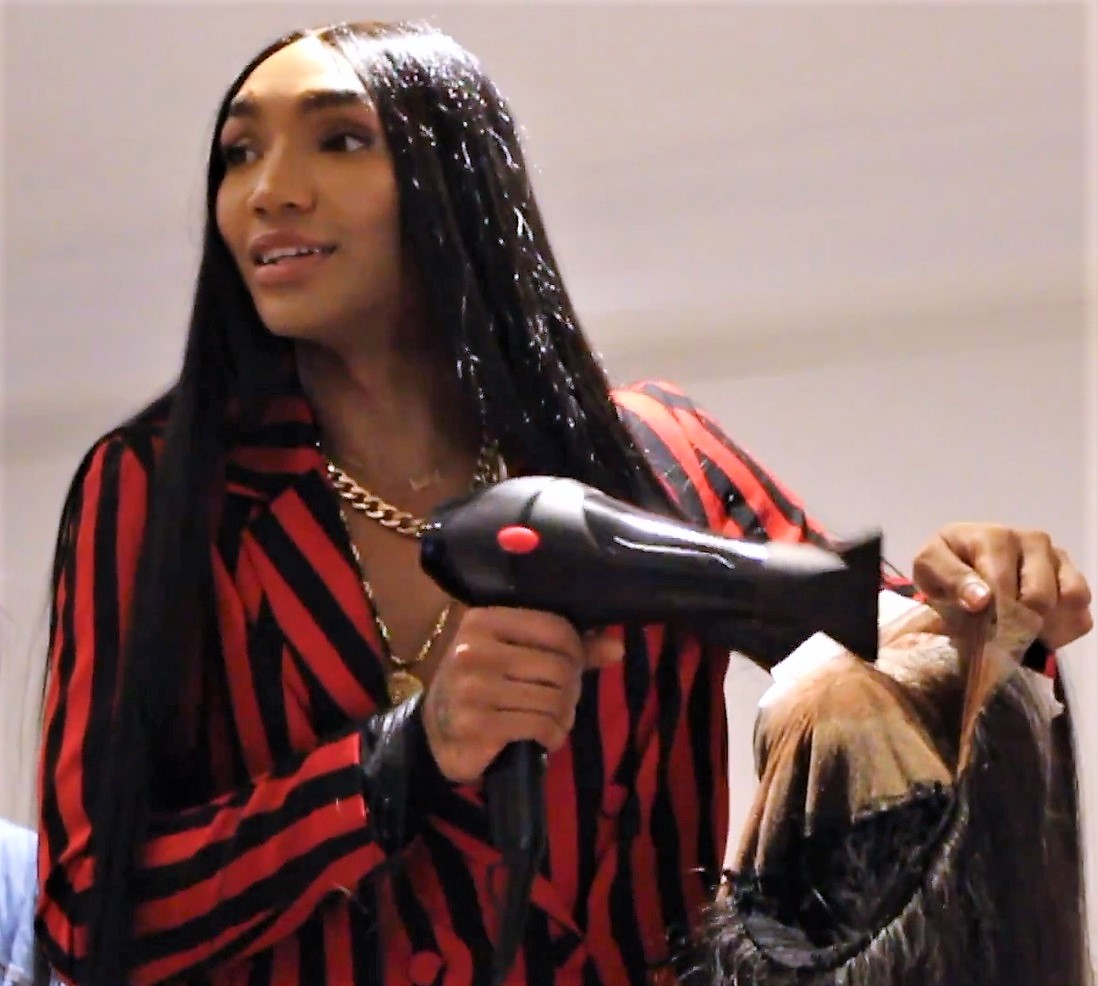
Tokyo Stylez (pictured in 2017) makes a guest appearance and meets with contestants back stage.

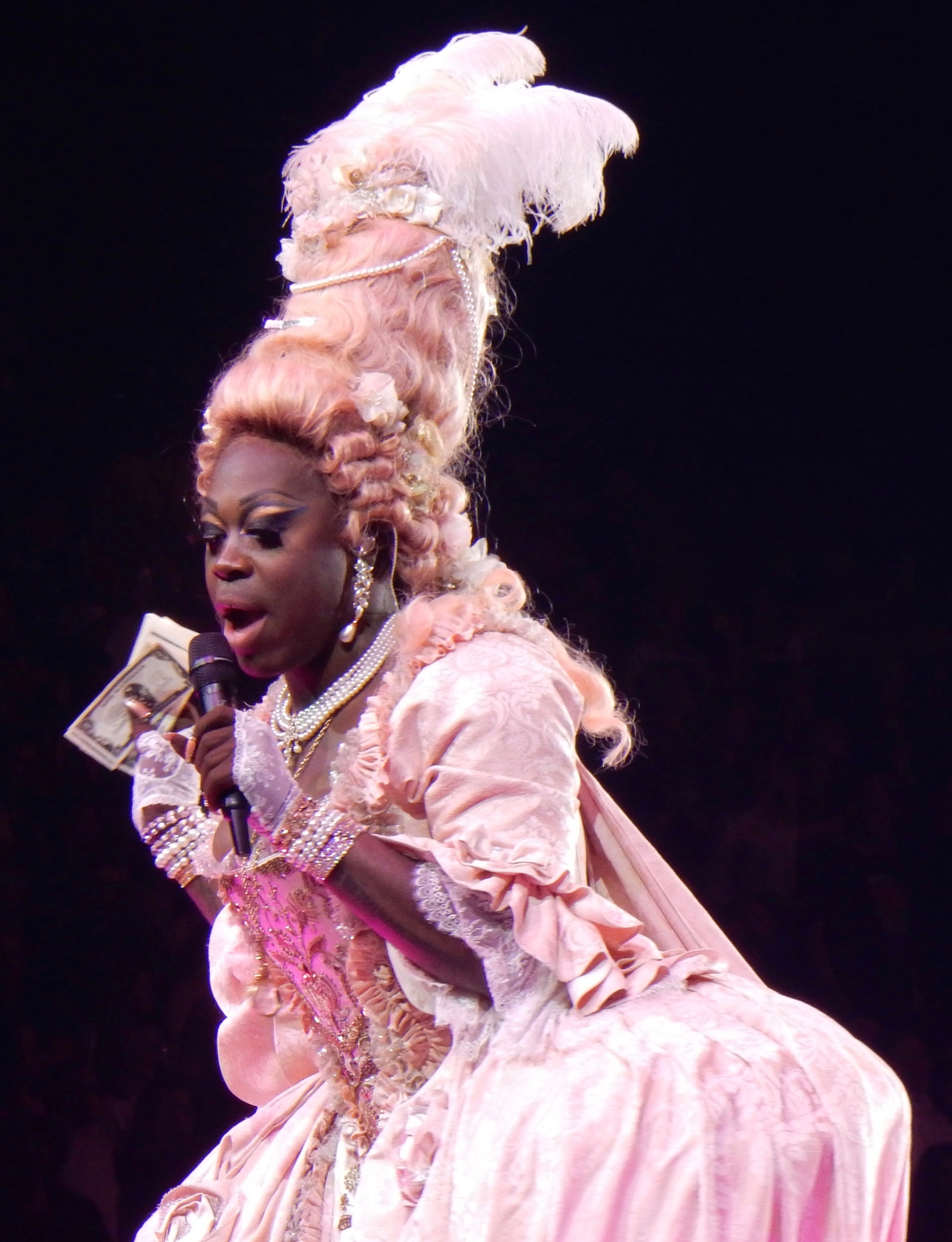
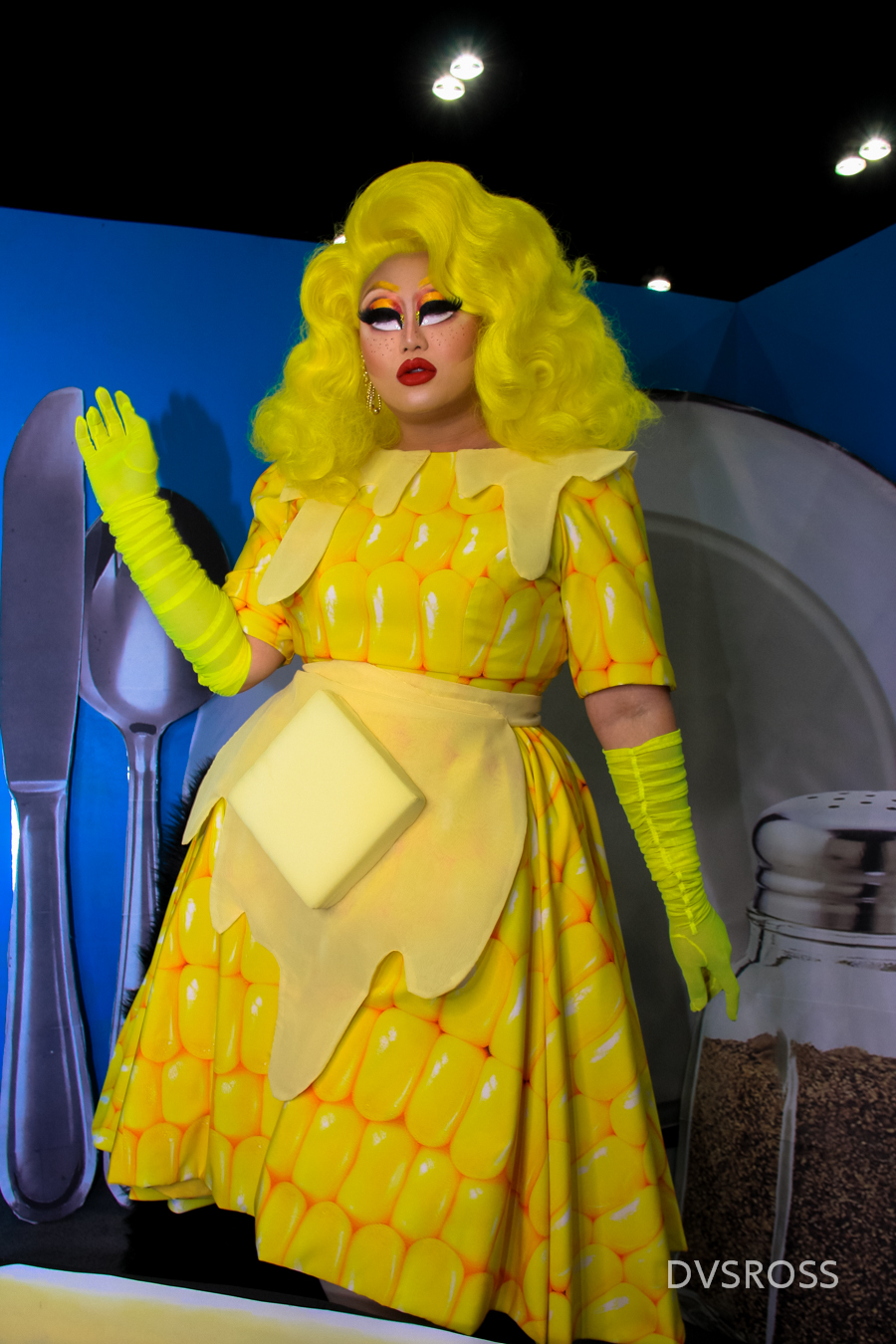
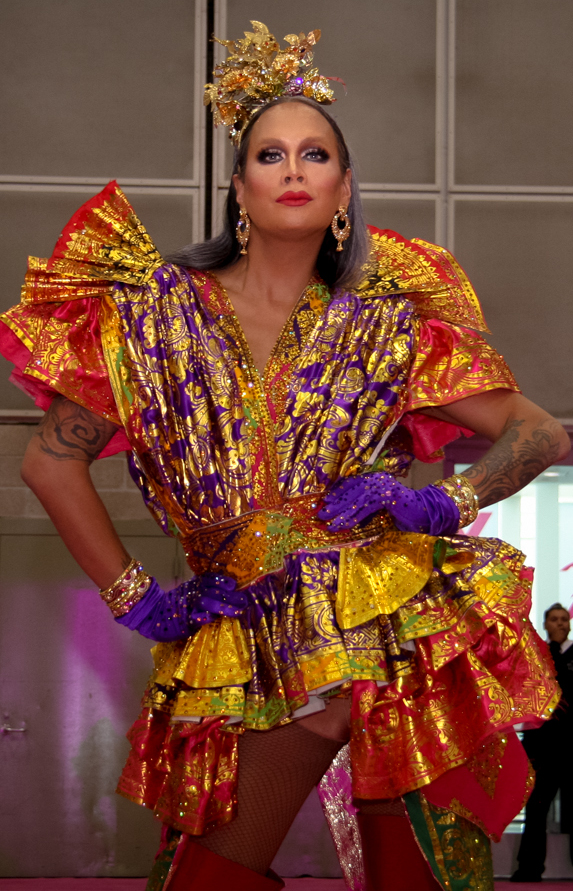
Former competitors Bob the Drag Queen (left), Kim Chi (center), and Raja (right) also make guest appearances.

The episode originally aired on January 2, 2026.

Cardi B is a guest judge. She also appeared on the corresponding episode of RuPaul's Drag Race: Untucked, along with Tokyo Stylez and Erika La' Pearl.

According to Bernardo Sim of Out, "It only took a 15-second sneak preview of Cardi B as an extra special guest judge in the season 18 premiere for an already intense discourse surrounding Minaj to escalate into an even wilder social media fight between Drag Race fans, the Barbz, and the Bardi Gang."

=== Fashion ===
For her entrance look, Athena Dion's dress is black and white. She carries an owl figurine and wears a headpiece. Kenya Pleaser's outfit is light blue. She has an afro and a headband. Nini Coco wears a colorful outfit with a rainbow headpiece and tall white boots. Jane Don't has a black outfit with many brooches, as well as a large black headpiece. Discord Addams has an outfit made from different patterns. She has a large blonde wig with an animal print, and she carries a ball with spikes. Mia Starr's dress is made from denim. DD Fuego's dress is orange. She has orange shoes and a spiky boa. Juicy Love Dion's dress has many ruffles and Vita VonTesse Starr's outfit has an animal print. Briar Blush's dress has a graphic print. She wears a long black wig and a white headband, as well as matching white tall boots and gloves. Mandy Mango presents a nurse-inspired outfit. She has two hoops in her wig. Ciara Myst has a horror-inspired outfit with the illusion of jack-o'-lanterns. Darlene Mitchell's green, white, and yellow outfit is inspired by corn. She wears a sash with the text "Miss Greentown". Myki Meeks has a purple dress.

In the Werk Room, RuPaul wears a tartan suit. For the main stage, RuPaul wears a dress made from belts. Cardi B wears a black-and-green outfit and a headpiece. Visage wears a green dress and Kressley has a blue suit.

For the fashion show, Ciara Myst has a black, blue, and yellow outfit. Athena Dion's pink dress is made from a shower curtain. She has a pink bow in her hair. Kenya Pleaser wears a short black dress with a silver bustier. Nini Coco has an asymmetrical, two-piece orange dress made from gift bags. Jane Don't's outfit is also made from a shower curtain. She has a pink wig and a small hat. Discord Addams has a dress made from grass, pussy willows, and chains. Mia Starr wears a black-and-white outfit inspired by Cardi B. DD Fuego's outfit has a colorful corset and silver draping. Juicy Love Dion has a short blue dress and blue hair. Vita VonTesse Starr's outfit is black and white. Small disco balls are attached as accessories. She carries an umbrella with black-and-white stripes. Briar Blush wears a cat- and burlesque-inspired outfit. She has a tail. Mady Mango has flowers on her dress and a large rose as a headpiece. Darlene Mitchell wears a short pink dress, a sleep mask, and a blonde wig. Myki Meeks has a dress made from curtains.

== Viewership ==
The premiere episode was the most-watched in the show's history.

== Reception ==
Jason P. Frank of Vulture rated the episode four out of five stars. According to Gay Times, Cardi B received widespread praise "for platforming her trans glam squad" on the show.
