= Briar Blush =

American drag performer (born 2000)

- Born: Micael Donegan; April 27, 2000 (age 26)
- Occupation: Drag performer
- Television: RuPaul's Drag Race (season 18)
- Website: briarblush.com

Briar Blush is the stage name of Micael Donegan (born April 27, 2000), an American drag performer known for competing on season 18 of RuPaul's Drag Race.

== Early life ==
Donegan grew up in Beverly, Massachusetts and is of Guatemalan descent. As a child, Donegan often played with their sister's dolls, using them as a creative outlet, which carried over into their drag persona. Growing up, Donegan was often bullied for being "weird" and gay, and revealed on episode 4 of Drag Race that they were ostracized by their family throughout their life. They attended Beverly High School, and were a member of its gay straight alliance before dropping out their senior year and becoming a runaway.

== Career ==
Donegan first discovered drag after attending a performance by Violencia Exclamation Point at the now-closed bar Machine. Upon dropping out of high school, Donegan moved to Orlando, Florida and immersed themself in the city's drag scene, which they describe as "cutthroat". While in Orlando, Donegan joined the Mercy burlesque drag house and began performing under the name Briar Blush Mercy. After competing on Orlando Drag Race Live, Briar Blush landed a gig at the popular gay bar Southern Nights in Orlando. Two years later, Donegan moved back to Boston and continued performing as Briar Blush, noting that the drag scene is "less homogenized, and less competitive" than in Orlando. Since moving back, Briar Blush has become a frequent performer at several of the city's LGBTQ venues, most notably Jacques Cabaret, Club Café and Shore Leave.

In 2026, Briar Blush, who Donegan refers to as the "pin-up princess" of Boston, competed on season 18 of RuPaul's Drag Race. During her time on Drag Race, Briar Blush was noted amongst fans for her feud with fellow contestant Athena Dion, although the two were close off-camera. In the third episode, Briar Blush was placed in the bottom, but won a lip-sync against Mandy Mango, eliminating her and remaining in the competition. In the following episode, she was placed in the bottom two, lost a lip-sync against Kenya Pleaser and was thus eliminated from the competition, placing 12th overall. Prior to that, however, she fainted during the judges' critiques due to contracting pneumonia prior to entering the competition, which later turned into sepsis after a doctor improperly treated it.

== Personal life ==
Donegan currently resides in the Roxbury neighborhood of Boston. While in drag, Briar Blush uses the pronouns she/her. Her drag brother is Jarvis Hammer, known for competing on season 5 of The Boulet Brothers' Dragula. Donegan is autistic.

== Filmography ==
=== Television ===
Year	Title	Role	Notes
2026	RuPaul's Drag Race (season 18)	Contestant	12th place
2026	RuPaul's Drag Race: Untucked (season 17)	Herself	4 episodes

=== Web series ===
Year	Title	Role	Notes
2026	Whatcha Packin'	Herself	Season 20, Episode 3
2026	Hello Hello Hello	Herself	Season 2, Episode 3
