= Vita VonTesse Starr =

American drag queen and makeup artist (born 1987)

- Born: Byron Rudolph; August 1, 1987 (age 39); Montgomery, Alabama, U.S.
- Occupations: Drag performer; designer
- Years active: 2019–present
- Television: RuPaul's Drag Race (season 18)

Vita VonTesse Starr is the stage name of Byron Rudolph (born August 1, 1987), a drag queen and designer known for competing on the eighteenth season of RuPaul's Drag Race, as well as her designing and sewing abilities.

== Career ==
Rudolph first discovered drag at age 8 after watching the 1995 film To Wong Foo, Thanks for Everything! Julie Newmar. Inspired by the character Vida Boheme, VonTesse Starr's first name comes as a mash-up of Boheme with Dita Von Teese, a burlesque dancer which also inspired her first last name. Starr comes from her drag mother, Daphne Raquel Starr, who she met in nearby Birmingham, Alabama. VonTesse Starr competed on the eighteenth season of RuPaul's Drag Race. She was eliminated from the competition on the seventh episode, placing 10th overall.

== Personal life ==
Her inspirations for drag are art, music, and culture. Diana Ross, Diahann Carroll, Aretha Franklin, and Patti LaBelle are some of the women she looks up to. She used to be emo and gothic as a teen.

== Filmography ==
=== Television ===
Year	Title	Role	Notes
2026	RuPaul's Drag Race (season 18)	Contestant	10th place
2026	RuPaul's Drag Race: Untucked (season 17)	Herself	7 episodes

=== Web series ===
Year	Title	Role	Notes
2026	Whatcha Packin'	Herself	Season 20, Episode 5
2026	Hello Hello Hello	Herself	Season 2, Episode 5
