= Mandy Mango =

American drag performer and registered nurse

- Born: Sigfried Ryan Aragona
- Education: West Chester University; Jacksonville State University
- Occupations: Drag performer; sexual health nurse
- Television: RuPaul's Drag Race (season 18)

Mandy Mango is the stage name of Sigfried Ryan Aragona, an American drag performer and sexual health nurse. He (Note: Aragona identifies as nonbinary and uses he/they pronouns outside of drag. For consistency, Mandy Mango is referred to using she/her pronouns, while he/him is used for Aragona.) competed on season 18 of RuPaul's Drag Race.

== Early life and education ==
Aragona grew up in a Filipino American family in Lansdale, Pennsylvania. His mother, a former pageant queen in the Philippines, won Best Evening Gown in the 1987 Miss Philippines competition in Baguio. Growing up, Aragona's most consistent support came from his brother, a former professional dancer. He attended North Penn High School, and graduated from West Chester University with a degree in nursing. At both schools, he was a member of the Omicron Delta Kappa honor society. In 2014, while at orientation for West Chester, he initially came out as bisexual, but later came out as gay to his parents while celebrating his mother's birthday in October. While attending West Chester, he was additionally selected by the Pennsylvania State System of Higher Education to embark on a trip along the Camino de Santiago. Aragona is currently pursuing his masters degree at Jacksonville State University.

== Career and public image ==
While at West Chester, Aragona performed as Mandy Mango for the first time at a competition, where she lip-synced to Chelley’s “Took the Night”, and won. Following graduation, Aragona moved to Williamsport, where he further immersed himself in drag culture. He found drag allowed him to express his feminine traits, which had long been an insecurity. Aragona also uses the Mandy Mango to pay homage to his Filipino heritage, with “Mango” referring to the Philippine Carabao mango, known as being among the sweetest mangoes in the world.

Since she began drag, Mandy Mango has become a frequent performer at Philadelphia nightlife competition Snatcherella 3000. In 2024, Mandy Mango hosted the No Arena Drag Show to protest the now abandoned plans to build a new home stadium for the Philadelphia 76ers in the city’s Chinatown.

Mandy Mango competed on the eighteenth season of RuPaul's Drag Race, and based her entrance look on the character Nurse Joy from the Pokémon franchise. She placed in the bottom on the first episode alongside Kenya Pleaser; however, both were allowed to remain in the competition. In the following episode, she placed in the bottom again, but won a lip-sync against DD Fuego, eliminating her, and was once again allowed to remain in the competition. In episode three, she once again landed in the bottom, but lost her lip-sync against Briar Blush, and was thus eliminated from the competition.

Outside of drag, Aragona is a registered nurse in the state of Pennsylvania, specializing in HIV/AIDS treatment. He spent four years working as a sexual health nurse for the AIDS Resource Alliance, a non-profit organization in Williamsport that provides resources, education and treatment for those living with HIV. As of 2026, Aragona currently works as a disease ambulatory nurse at Penn Medicine.

== Personal life ==
As of 2026, Aragona lives in the neighborhood of Center City in Philadelphia, Pennsylvania. He owns four cats: Wasabi, Miso, Soy, and Sriracha.

== Filmography ==
=== Television ===
Year	Title	Role	Notes
2026	RuPaul's Drag Race (season 18)	Contestant	13th place
2026	RuPaul's Drag Race: Untucked (season 17)	Herself	3 episodes

=== Web series ===
Year	Title	Role	Notes
2026	Whatcha Packin'	Herself	Season 20, Episode 2
2026	Hello Hello Hello	Herself	Season 2, Episode 2
