= Kenya Pleaser =

American drag queen and makeup artist

- Born: Nigel Kenyatta Johnson; December 4, 1998 (age 27); Manning, South Carolina, U.S.
- Occupations: Drag performer; designer
- Years active: 2022–present
- Television: RuPaul's Drag Race (season 18)

Kenya Pleaser is the stage name of Nigel Kenyatta Johnson, an American drag queen based in Columbia, South Carolina best known for competing on season 18 of RuPaul's Drag Race.

== Career ==
Pleaser got her name from her real middle name, Kenyatta, and the phrase "Can you please her?" She started drag in 2022 and her first performance was “Finally” by Cece Peniston. She is a Lizzo impersonator. Before drag race, Pleaser was on tour with singer Chappell Roan in Columbia. Her home bar is the Capital Club, the oldest gay bar in Columbia.

== Personal life ==
Johnson was born and grew up in Manning, South Carolina Outside of drag, Johnson works at a military base in the education center.

== Filmography ==
=== Television ===
Year	Title	Role	Notes
2026	RuPaul's Drag Race (season 18)	Contestant	7th place
2026	RuPaul's Drag Race: Untucked (season 17)	Herself	11 episodes

=== Web series ===
Year	Title	Role	Notes
2026	Whatcha Packin'	Herself	Season 20, Episode 8
2026	Hello Hello Hello	Herself	Season 2, Episode 8
