= Ciara Myst =

American drag performer

- Born: Ryan Straut; 1993 or 1994 (age 32–33); Florida, U.S.
- Education: Purdue University
- Occupations: Drag performer; make-up artist
- Television: RuPaul's Drag Race (season 18)
- Website: ciaramyst.com

Ciara Myst is the stage name of Ryan Straut, an American drag performer and prosthetic make-up artist known for competing on the eighteenth season of RuPaul's Drag Race.

== Early life ==
Straut was born in Florida, but grew up in Wisconsin and Minnesota. While living in the former, their father was the manager of several Famous Dave's restaurant chains. As a child, Straut became fascinated with science fiction, which would go on to greatly influence their drag persona Ciara Myst. Straut attended Purdue University, where they were a performer for the glee club. They graduated in 2015 with a degree in computer graphics technology and forensic science.

== Career ==
After graduating from Purdue, Straut moved to Atlanta, where he began working as a make-up and prosthetic artist on several major productions, including The CW's reboot of Dynasty, Chicago P.D., Chicago Fire, and several Marvel Studios films. Straut tried drag for the first time in 2019, but did not fully commit himself to it until two years later. Taking inspiration from science fiction, comic books, goth subculture and horror, as well as her experience with prosthetics and makeup, Straut created the Ciara Myst drag persona. From 2022 to 2024, Ciara Myst served as board president of the Indy Drag Theatre, which was co-founded by Blair St. Clair. In 2024, Ciara Myst served as an ambassador for Drag Out the Vote, a branch of Michelle Obama's When We All Vote campaign, to encourage participation in voting during the presidential election. Ciara Myst competed on the eighteenth season of RuPaul's Drag Race, and was eliminated from the competition on the sixth episode, after placing in the bottom two of the talent show and losing a lip-sync against Myki Meeks. Ciara Myst placed 11th overall.

== Personal life ==
Straut is based in Indianapolis.

== Filmography ==
=== Television ===
Year	Title	Role	Notes
2026	RuPaul's Drag Race (season 18)	Contestant	11th place
2026	RuPaul's Drag Race: Untucked (season 17)	Herself	6 episodes

=== Web series ===
Year	Title	Role	Notes
2026	Whatcha Packin'	Herself	Season 20, Episode 4
2026	Hello Hello Hello	Herself	Season 2, Episode 4
