= DD Fuego =

Mexican-American drag performer

- Born: Daniel Eduardo Dabdoub; 1987 or 1988 (age 37–38); Texas, U.S.
- Education: New York University
- Occupations: Drag performer; production designer
- Television: RuPaul's Drag Race (season 18)
- Website: ddfuego.com

DD Fuego is the stage name of Daniel Eduardo Dabdoub, a Mexican-American drag performer and fashion designer known for competing on season 18 of RuPaul's Drag Race.

== Early life and education ==
Dabdoub was born in Texas and grew up in a large Middle Eastern family in San Pedro Garza García, Mexico, a suburb of Monterrey. His mother, a Texas native herself, chose Texas as his birthplace so he could gain American citizenship. Dabdoub is of Palestinian and Lebanese descent, and describes his father as "100% Middle Eastern". Dabdoub attended New York University, graduating with a Bachelors of Fine Arts from the Tisch School of the Arts.

== Career ==
Dabdoub started his career as a production, costume and set designer for television and theatre, most notably Funny or Die's popular game show Billy on the Street and the off-Broadway play Streepshow!. Dabdoub developed a love of drag from his design career, wanting to use his experience to conceptualize drag-style outfits on a budget, and built his aesthetic on intricate, runway-ready designs. Dabdoub first performed as DD Fuego in 2017, and previously designed outfits for Drag Race alums such as Lemon and Kandy Muse. She additionally produced a candle collaboration, "Spicy Margarita", with Outdoor Fellow.

DD Fuego competed on the eighteenth season of RuPaul's Drag Race. She placed safe in the first episode. However, in the following episode, she was placed in the bottom two. She became the first queen eliminated from the competition after losing a lip-sync against Mandy Mango, placing fourteenth overall.

DD Fuego appeared on the season 12 finale of The Real Housewives of New York City, and released the coloring book Finding Your Fuego in 2022, basing its story on her own experience with drag. The day after the season premiere of RuPaul's Drag Race, Fuego announced on Instagram a collaboration with Betsey Johnson on a shoe line, with proceeds benefitting the Elton John AIDS Foundation.

== Personal life ==
Dabdoub lives in New York City, having first moved to attend college. Before being cast, Fuego auditioned ten times for RuPaul's Drag Race and once for Drag Race México.

== Filmography ==
=== Television ===
Year	Title	Role	Notes
2020	The Real Housewives of New York City	Herself	Season 12, Episode 21: "Viva la Dysfunction"
2026	RuPaul's Drag Race (season 18)	Contestant	14th place
2026	RuPaul's Drag Race: Untucked (season 17)	Herself	2 episodes

=== Web series ===
Year	Title	Role	Notes
2026	Whatcha Packin'	Herself	Season 20, Episode 1
2026	Hello Hello Hello	Herself	Season 2, Episode 1
