= RuPaul's Drag Race season 19 =

RuPaul's Drag Race
- Season 19
- Hosted by: RuPaul
- Companion show: Untucked!

Season chronology
- ← Previous; Season 18

The nineteenth season of the American television series RuPaul's Drag Race is scheduled to premiere in January 2027. Casting for the season began on October 1, 2025, with a deadline of November 14, 2025.
