= Myki Meeks =

American drag performer

- Born: Michael Reichert
- Education: University of Central Florida (BFA)
- Website: mykimeeks.com

Myki Meeks is the stage name of Michael Reichert, an American drag performer best known for winning the eighteenth season of RuPaul's Drag Race. Meeks uses she/her pronouns in her drag persona.

== Early life ==
Meeks grew up in Tampa, Florida. She moved to Orlando to go to college and earned a BFA in Musical Theatre from the University of Central Florida, where the people she met became some of her "best friends to this day." Meeks stayed in Tampa after graduation and began participating in the Orlando club scene at venues like Southern Nights and Parliament House. In her early 20s, Meeks had the opportunity to see drag performers in Orlando like Sasha Colby, Kylie Sonique Love, Jazell Barbie Royale, and Darcel Stevens, which she has described as being formative on her own artistry. Meeks has particularly cited a performance by Kennedy Davenport as "life-changing," and as her inspiration to start doing drag.

== Career ==
Meeks resides in Orlando, Florida, where she is a staple performer in the local drag and theater scene. Meeks works for the Renaissance Theatre Company, and she has produced and performed in Orlando events including Off the Record, The Gig, and V-Bar. She has described her aesthetic as being a mix of "old Hollywood glamour" and "party girl," and has described herself "as a cross between Ava Gardner and Charli XCX." In response to some observers questioning her brand as a drag performer, Meeks stated "my brand is that I'm a working drag queen," having spent years before the show performing as frequently as five nights per week. When Meeks received the casting call confirming that she would compete on the eighteenth season of RuPaul's Drag Race, several alumni of the series from Central Florida gave her advice and encouragement ahead of the competition, including Roxxxy Andrews, Ginger Minj, and Jewels Sparkles.

On season 18 of RuPaul's Drag Race, Meeks won episodes seven, twelve, thirteen, and fourteen. She is one of the few contestants in the history of the RuPaul's Drag Race franchise to earn four wins in a single season of the show, the first contestant to win the final three episodes before the finale in a row, and the first winner of the show not to win any of the first five episodes. She had the most wins heading into the season finale, a televised event filmed at Marquee New York in Manhattan's Chelsea neighborhood, where she was ultimately crowned after competing against runner-up Nini Coco and third place finisher Darlene Mitchell. Meeks first lip sync performance after winning RuPaul's Drag Race was to "Immaterial" by SOPHIE, a song that Meeks selected because it "was a torch song for me, and it’s for a torch song for a lot of queer people who feel like they can be any expression that they want to be."

When asked what her future looks like after winning RuPaul's Drag Race, Meeks has cited Jinkx Monsoon and Bob the Drag Queen, who have both performed in productions on Broadway after winning the show. Meeks has also cited Sasha Velour, who returned to her community after winning the show and used the platform it gave her to produce and direct queer performance arts events.

Meeks has been an advocate for LGBTQ rights, particularly in her home state of Florida. Meeks has been particularly critical of Republican governor Ron DeSantis, saying that "Ron DeSantis hates us so much because he used to be a drag queen! He was so ugly and so terrible at it, we ran him out of the scene. Now, he has an agenda against us." Meeks has advocated for greater connections between the LGBTQ community and other marginalized groups: "Every Pride is political, but we all need to step up to the plate and really make our voices heard, especially with a government that’s trying to silence not just us but a lot of minority groups as well. This isn’t just Pride for the queers, this is Pride for the immigrants, Pride for anybody who is being discounted by this White House. We can still party — but just remember what the party is for."

== Filmography ==
=== Television ===
Year	Title	Role	Notes
2026	RuPaul's Drag Race (season 18)	Contestant	Winner (16 episodes)
2026	RuPaul's Drag Race: Untucked (season 17)	Herself	14 episodes
2026	The Drew Barrymore Show	Herself	Season 6, Episode 235
2026	Good Morning America	Herself	Season 51, Episode 209

=== Web series ===
Year	Title	Role	Notes
2026	Whatcha Packin'	Herself	Season 20, Episode 13
2026	Hello Hello Hello	Herself	Season 2, Episode 13

Awards and achievements
Preceded by Onya Nurve	Winner of RuPaul's Drag Race; US season 18	Succeeded by Incumbent
