= Discord Addams =

American drag performer

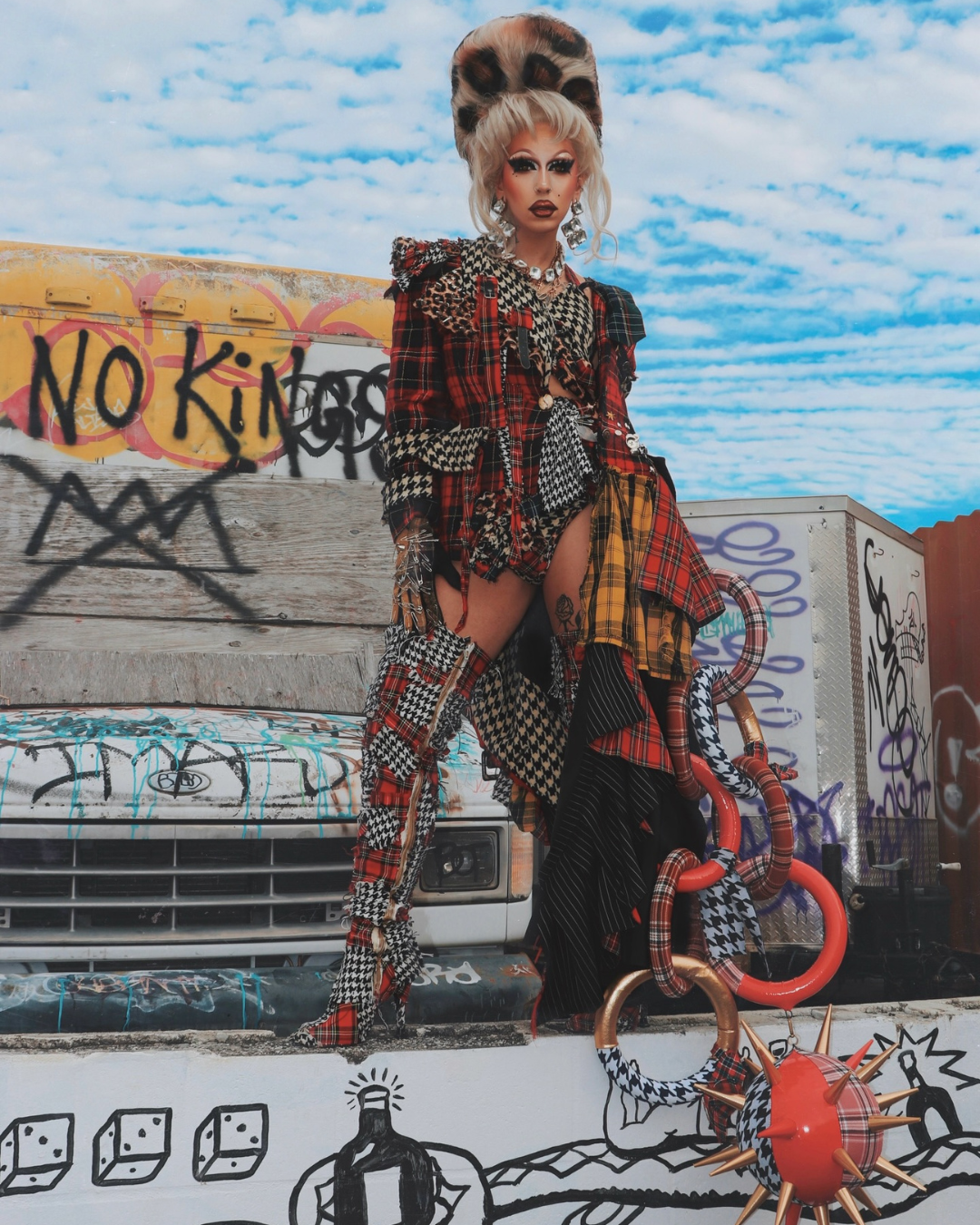
- Discord Addams in St. Petersburg in 2025
- Born: Dustin Agosta; Akron, Ohio, U.S.
- Occupation: Drag queen
- Height: 5 ft 5 in (165 cm)
- Partner: Gidget von Addams (engaged)
- Website: https://discordaddams.com/

Signature
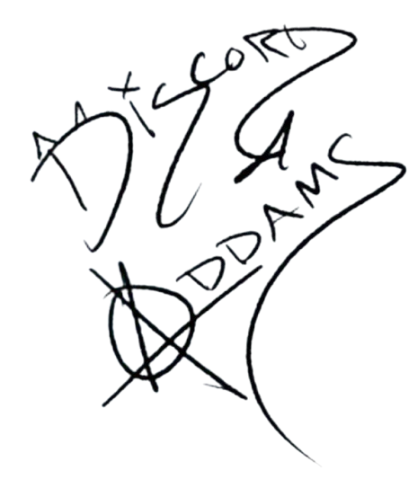

Discord Addams is the stage name of Dustin Agosta, an American drag queen most known for competing on the eighteenth season of RuPaul's Drag Race.

== Early life ==
Discord Addams grew up in Akron, Ohio and lived in the local punk scene.

== Career ==
Discord Addams first got into drag in 2011 after seeing Raja Gemini and seeing how punk and alternative culture are tied into the art form. Addams competed on the eighteenth season of RuPaul's Drag Race which aired in 2026, finishing in sixth place after being eliminated in the twelfth episode in an outfit she calls "Princesscord". In the show, she was known for her bizarre runway walk. She has had to address false rumors that she was disqualified from the competition.

== Personal life ==
Discord Addams is based in St. Petersburg, Florida, and engaged to Gidget Von Addams. Previously, Discord Addams lived in Bradenton, Florida, and the couple have also lived in Chicago, Illinois. Agosta is autistic, and plays the guitar in a punk rock band.

== Filmography ==
=== Television ===
Year	Title	Role	Notes
2018	Camp Wannakiki	Herself	Audience member; Season 1, Episode 7: "Queen of Camp"
2026	RuPaul's Drag Race (season 18)	Contestant	6th place
2026	RuPaul's Drag Race: Untucked (season 17)	Herself	12 episodes

=== Web Series ===
Year	Title	Role	Notes
2026	Whatcha Packin'	Herself	Season 20, Episode 9
2026	Hello Hello Hello	Herself	Season 2, Episode 9
2026	F**K This! With Discord Addams	Herself	Speaker

== Discography ==
=== Singles ===
Year	Title	Performer(s)	Producers(s)	Other credits
2026	Another Drag Song	Discord Addams	Kat Sass, Gaybanditt, Hardknock	N/A
2026	We Cant Be Friends (Discords Version)	Discord Addams, GayBandit	Mike Johnson	Ariana Grande (original song)

== See also ==
- List of people from St. Petersburg, Florida
