= Athena Dion =

American drag performer

- Born: Stavros Stavrakis; July 25, 1987 (age 39); Tarpon Springs, Florida, U.S.
- Education: Florida International University (BS)
- Television: RuPaul's Drag Race (season 18)

Athena Dion is the stage name of Stavros Stavrakis (born July 25, 1986), an American drag performer who is a contestant on season 18 of RuPaul's Drag Race. Athena Dion has been a drag artist for 14 years. She is currently based in the Miami metropolitan area.

== Early life and education ==
Stavrakis was born in 1987, in Tarpon Springs, Florida, a Greek community near St. Petersburg. He describes his upbringing as "very family-oriented" with "strong Greek cultural roots" where "all expressions were not always celebrated." He attended church every Sunday, attended Greek school, took Greek dance lessons and participated in Greek festivals annually. His stepdad was in the military, however, despite being a "military family" that relocated often, he grew up steeped in Greek culture.

According to Stavrakis, he was a "showgirl at heart" from a young age, surrounded by "very strong-willed women with big personalities, big opinions and even bigger hair." However, once he reached puberty, he received backlash for "acting feminine" and started to "box it all back in" and finding "other ways to be." It wasn't until high school that he decided to "go back to where [he] started" and "release his inner showgirl." After his father retired, Stavrakis' family moved to South Florida, where he began sneaking into different gay clubs as a 14 year old to watch South Beach drag performers.

Stavrakis studied hospitality and tourism at Florida International University and received his Bachelor of Science degree in 2011.

== Drag career ==
Stavrakis' first exposure to drag was in the Robin Williams film The Birdcage. Stavrakis began their drag career after taking a position as a drag queen working the door at the Living Room nightclub in Fort Lauderdale, Florida. He chose his stage name based on the Greek goddess Athena.

Dion has described herself as a "social drag queen" and an artist who focuses on building community. Athena is the mother of the House of Dion, a drag house based in Florida. Morphine Love Dion and Plane Jane are her drag daughters, and both competed together on season 16 of RuPaul's Drag Race. Juicy Love Dion, who is competing against Athena on season 18 is the drag daughter of Morphine Love Dion, making her Athena's drag granddaughter. Juicy Love Dion and Athena Dion are the first "grandmother-granddaughter" duo to compete against each other on the same season of Drag Race. Dion was eliminated from the competition on episode 9, after lip-syncing against Juicy Love Dion. Athena also has a drag daughter named Miss Toto Clermont Dion who is based in Chicago.

Dion has competed in drag pageants, including Miami Beach Gay Pride, and Ultimate Miami Drag Queen. She has won the following titles:

- Miss North Carolina Continental 2011
- Miss Noche Latina 2013
- Miss South Carolina Continental 2014
- Miss Miami Beach Pride 2015
- Ultimate Miami Drag Queen 2017
- Miss Pride of Wynwood 2018 (Emeritus)

She hosts several drag brunches in Miami, including R House Brunch in Wynwood, Florida. She also works in venues such as the Palace Bar, Club Score, and Southern Nights. Stavrakis has done acts impersonating Gloria Estefan.

Dion has participated in and organized various charity events for various causes including youth homelessness, helping burn survivors, and LGBTQ+ community outreach. During the COVID-19 pandemic in 2020, Stavrakis helped organize Virtual Pride 2020 with the South Florida Pride Collective. Stavrakis is also the owner of the drag entertainment company named Dream Queens, a group of drag artists and fans who work on charitable causes to "uplift, empower and motivate the human spirit" through the lens of drag and drag performance.

In 2016, Dion auditioned on season 11 of America's Got Talent alongside drag artists Sasha Lords, Nicole Halliwell, Calypso Monroe, and Nicole Saphire as a Spice Girls impersonation act named "Spice Gurlz". Dion played Posh Spice. The group did not advance past auditions after receiving two "no" votes. In 2018, Dion appeared on the podcast It's Happening hosted by Snooki and Joey Camasta.

In the summer of 2021, Dion hosted part of the Tel Aviv Pride celebration while touring Israel.

== Personal life ==
Outside of drag, Stavrakis identifies as non-binary and goes by both she or he pronouns. He splits his time between Miami and Mykonos. Her first romantic relationship was with a drag queen, Vegas Dion, who ended up becoming his drag mother. Dion has spoken out about anti-drag legislation in Florida.

== Awards ==
- 2017 SAVE Luminary award

== Filmography ==
=== Films ===
Year	Title	Role	Notes
2023	Turn Up the Love: Connecting to Pride	Herself	Documentary

=== Television ===
Year	Title	Role	Notes
2019	Lindsay Lohan's Beach Club	Herself	Season 1, Episode 8: "Do the Lilo"
2026	RuPaul's Drag Race (season 18)	Contestant	8th place
2026	RuPaul's Drag Race: Untucked (season 17)	Herself	9 episodes

=== Web series ===
Year	Title	Role	Notes
2026	Whatcha Packin'	Herself	Season 20, Episode 7
2026	Hello Hello Hello	Herself	Season 2, Episode 7
