= RuPaul's Drag Race season 18 =

2026 season of RuPaul's Drag Race

RuPaul's Drag Race
- Season 18
- Promotional poster for season eighteen
- Hosted by: RuPaul
- Judges: RuPaul; Michelle Visage; Carson Kressley; Law Roach; Ts Madison; Ross Mathews; Jamal Sims
- No. of contestants: 14
- Winner: Myki Meeks
- Runner-up: Nini Coco
- Miss Congeniality: Jane Don't
- Companion show: Untucked!
- No. of episodes: 16

Release
- Original network: MTV
- Original release: January 2 – April 17, 2026

Season chronology
- ← Previous; Season 17 Next → Season 19

The 18th season of the American television series RuPaul's Drag Race premiered on MTV on January 2, 2026. Hosted by RuPaul, the reality competition series shows 14 drag queens competing for the title of "America's Next Drag Superstar". Myki Meeks won the title alongside a cash prize of $200,000, and a year's supply of Anastasia Beverly Hills cosmetics. Nini Coco was the runner-up, Jane Don't was voted Miss Congeniality, and Juicy Love Dion was declared "Queen of She Done Already Done Had Herses".

RuPaul remained the host and head judge of the series, while television personalities Michelle Visage, Carson Kressley, Ts Madison, Ross Mathews, and fashion stylist Law Roach resumed their role as regular judges.

== Development ==
On August 20, 2024, MTV announced the series renewal for Season 18 along with its companion series RuPaul's Drag Race: Untucked. Casting for the eighteenth season began on September 30, 2024 with a deadline of December 6, 2024.

== Marketing ==
Season 17 winner Onya Nurve presented the contestants through the series official YouTube channel on December 2, 2025. The promo theme was "Let There Be Light," with the contestants wearing ethereal and flowy looks, and the corresponding marketing being radiant and glowy. An official trailer was released on December 9, 2025, which featured the contestants and the season's celebrity guest judges.

== Contestants ==
RuPaul's Drag Race season 18 contestants and their backgrounds (Note: All ages, names, with hometowns, and outcome are stated at time of filming.)
Contestant	Age	Hometown	Outcome
Myki Meeks	29	Orlando, Florida	Winner
Nini Coco	29	Denver, Colorado	Runner-up
Darlene Mitchell	34	Los Angeles, California	3rd place
Juicy Love Dion	24	Miami, Florida	4th place (Note: Juicy was crowned Queen of She Done Already Done Had Herses after winning the Lip Sync RuPaul-A-Paruza Smackdown.)
Jane Don't	32	Seattle, Washington	5th place (Note: Jane Don't was voted Miss Congeniality by fellow contestants.)
Discord Addams	34	St. Petersburg, Florida	6th place
Kenya Pleaser	27	Sumter, South Carolina	7th place
Athena Dion	38	Miami, Florida	8th place
Mia Starr	39	West Palm Beach, Florida	9th place
Vita VonTesse Starr	38	Montgomery, Alabama	10th place
Ciara Myst	31	Indianapolis, Indiana	11th place
Briar Blush	25	Boston, Massachusetts	12th place
Mandy Mango	29	Philadelphia, Pennsylvania	13th place
DD Fuego	37	New York City, New York	14th place

== Contestant progress ==
Legend:

Myki Meeks won RuPaul's Drag Race season 18.
Nini Coco was the runner-up.
Jane Don’t was voted Miss Congeniality (Miss C) by fellow contestants.
Juicy Love Dion was declared Queen of She Done Already Done Had Herses (SDADHH) after winning the final lip sync in the RuPaul-A-Paruza Smackdown.
WIN indicates that the contestant won the challenge.
TOP2 indicates that the contestant was one of the two best performing in the challenge, but lost the lip sync to win it.
SAFE indicates that the contestant was declared safe by the judges.
BTM (Bottom) indicates that the contestant was up for elimination.
ELIM (Eliminated) indicates that the contestant was eliminated.
Guest indicates that the contestant remained or returned as a guest.
LOSS indicates that the eliminated contestant participated in the RuPaul-A-Paruza Smackdown, but lost one of the lip syncs.

Contestants progress with placements in each episode
Contestant	Episode															
Contestant	1 (Note: In episode 1, Kenya Pleaser and Mandy Mango were announced as bottom two of the week. However, it was later announced that there would be no eliminations.)	2	3	4	5	6	7	8	9	10	11	12	13	14	15	16
Myki Meeks	SAFE	SAFE	SAFE	SAFE	Guest	BTM	WIN	SAFE	SAFE	SAFE	SAFE	WIN	WIN	WIN	Guest	Winner
Nini Coco	WIN	SAFE	SAFE	SAFE	SAFE	Guest	SAFE	WIN	SAFE	SAFE	SAFE	BTM	BTM	BTM	Guest	Runner-up
Darlene Mitchell	SAFE	SAFE	SAFE	SAFE	SAFE	Guest	SAFE	SAFE	SAFE	SAFE	WIN	SAFE	SAFE	WIN	Guest	Eliminated
Juicy Love Dion	SAFE	SAFE	WIN	SAFE	WIN	Guest	BTM	SAFE	BTM	SAFE	BTM	SAFE	SAFE	ELIM	SDADHH	Guest
Jane Don't	SAFE	WIN	SAFE	SAFE	Guest	TOP2	SAFE	SAFE	WIN	WIN	SAFE	SAFE	ELIM		LOSS	Miss C
Discord Addams	SAFE	SAFE	SAFE	SAFE	Guest	SAFE	SAFE	SAFE	SAFE	SAFE	SAFE	ELIM			LOSS	Guest
Kenya Pleaser	BTM	SAFE	SAFE	BTM	Guest	SAFE	SAFE	BTM	SAFE	TOP2	ELIM				LOSS	Guest
Athena Dion	SAFE	SAFE	SAFE	SAFE	Guest	WIN	SAFE	SAFE	ELIM						LOSS	Guest
Mia Starr	SAFE	SAFE	SAFE	SAFE	WIN	Guest	SAFE	ELIM							TOP2	Guest
Vita VonTesse Starr	TOP2	SAFE	SAFE	WIN	SAFE	Guest	ELIM								LOSS	Guest
Ciara Myst	SAFE	SAFE	SAFE	SAFE	BTM (Note: In episode 5, Ciara was voted by her fellow competitors as the bottom queen of the week, but did not lipsync until episode 6, when Myki was also placed in the bottom by group vote.)	ELIM									LOSS	Guest
Briar Blush	SAFE	SAFE	BTM	ELIM											Guest (Note: Briar revealed during the episode that due to medical complications, she will not be participating in the RuPaul-A-Paruza.)	Guest
Mandy Mango	BTM	BTM	ELIM												LOSS	Guest
DD Fuego	SAFE	ELIM													LOSS	Guest

== Lip syncs ==
Legend:

The contestant won the lip sync to win the challenge.
The contestant was eliminated after their first time in the bottom.
The contestant was eliminated after their second time in the bottom.
The contestant was eliminated after their third time in the bottom.
The contestant was eliminated after their fourth time in the bottom.
The contestant won the first round of the Lip Sync RuPaul-A-Paruza Smackdown and advanced to the next round.
The contestant won the second round of the Lip Sync RuPaul-A-Paruza Smackdown and advanced to the next round.
The contestant won the third round of the Lip Sync RuPaul-A-Paruza Smackdown and advanced to the next round.
The contestant won the final round of the Lip Sync RuPaul-A-Paruza Smackdown and was declared Queen of She Done Already Done Had Herses.
The contestant won the Lip Sync for the Crown and was declared the winner of the season.

Episode	Top contestants			Song	Winner
1	Nini Coco	vs.	Vita VonTesse Starr	"Enough (Miami)" (Cardi B)	Nini Coco
Episode	Bottom contestants			Song	Eliminated
2	DD Fuego	vs.	Mandy Mango	"Too Much" (Dove Cameron)	DD Fuego
3	Briar Blush	vs.	Mandy Mango	"Love in Real Life" (Lizzo)	Mandy Mango
4	Briar Blush	vs.	Kenya Pleaser	"Lights Camera Action" (Kylie Minogue)	Briar Blush
Episode	Top contestants			Song	Winner
5	Juicy Love Dion	vs.	Mia Starr	"Pretty Ugly" (Zara Larsson)	Juicy Love Dion
5	Juicy Love Dion	vs.	Mia Starr	"Pretty Ugly" (Zara Larsson)	Mia Starr
6	Athena Dion	vs.	Jane Don't	"Jerkin'" (Amyl and the Sniffers)	Athena Dion
6	Bottom contestants			Song	Eliminated
6	Ciara Myst	vs.	Myki Meeks	"Toxic" (Britney Spears)	Ciara Myst
7	Juicy Love Dion	vs.	Vita VonTesse Starr	"Houdini" (Dua Lipa)	Vita VonTesse Starr
8	Kenya Pleaser	vs.	Mia Starr	"Head Over Heels" (The Go-Go's)	Mia Starr
9	Athena Dion	vs.	Juicy Love Dion	"Call Me When You Break Up" (Selena Gomez, Benny Blanco, Gracie Abrams)	Athena Dion
Episode	Top contestants			Song	Winner
10	Jane Don't	vs.	Kenya Pleaser	"Feels Like Another One" (Patti LaBelle)	Jane Don't
Episode	Bottom contestants			Song	Eliminated
11	Juicy Love Dion	vs.	Kenya Pleaser	"Total Eclipse of the Heart" (Bonnie Tyler)	Kenya Pleaser
12	Discord Addams	vs.	Nini Coco	"We Can't Be Friends (Wait for Your Love)" (Ariana Grande)	Discord Addams
13	Jane Don't	vs.	Nini Coco	"Garden of Eden" (Lady Gaga)	Jane Don't
14	Juicy Love Dion	vs.	Nini Coco	"Super Graphic Ultra Modern Girl" (Chappell Roan)	Juicy Love Dion
Episode	Eliminated contestants			Song	Winner
15	Athena Dion	vs.	Ciara Myst	"Born Naked" (RuPaul ft. Clairy Browne)	Ciara Myst
15	Mandy Mango	vs.	Mia Starr	"Just What They Want" (RuPaul)	Mia Starr
15	DD Fuego	vs.	Vita VonTesse Starr	"Main Event" (RuPaul)	Vita VonTesse Starr
15	Mia Starr	vs.	Vita VonTesse Starr	"Call Me Mother" (RuPaul)	Mia Starr
15	Ciara Myst	vs.	Kenya Pleaser	"Pretty Gang (Ellis Miah Remix)" (RuPaul)	Kenya Pleaser
15	Discord Addams	vs.	Jane Don't	"Sissy That Walk" (RuPaul)	Jane Don't
15	Jane Don't	vs.	Juicy Love Dion	"Cha Cha Bitch" (RuPaul ft. AB Soto)	Juicy Love Dion
15	Kenya Pleaser	vs.	Mia Starr	"Peanut Butter" (RuPaul ft. Big Freedia)	Mia Starr
15	Juicy Love Dion	vs.	Mia Starr	"Cover Girl" (RuPaul)	Juicy Love Dion
Episode	Final contestants			Song	Winner
16	Myki Meeks	vs.	Nini Coco	"Every Girl You've Ever Loved" (Miley Cyrus ft. Naomi Campbell)	Myki Meeks

== Guest judges ==
RuPaul and Michelle Visage remained as the regular judges, with Carson Kressley, Law Roach, Ts Madison, and Ross Mathews reappearing as alternating judges. Various celebrity guest judges set to appear were revealed on December 9, 2025. Starring celebrity guest judges are listed below in order of episode appearance.

- Cardi B, rapper
- Dove Cameron, singer and actress
- Sarah Sherman, comedian and actress
- Annaleigh Ashford, actress, singer and dancer
- Zara Larsson, singer and songwriter
- Amy Taylor, musician and activist
- Leland, singer and songwriter
- Brooke Shields, actress
- Benny Blanco, record producer
- Iman, model and actress
- Atsuko Okatsuka, stand-up comedian
- Danielle Pinnock, actress, comedian and writer
- Julianne Nicholson, actress
- Teyana Taylor, singer and actress

=== Special guests ===
Special guests who appeared in episodes, but did not judge on the main stage.

Episode 1

- Bob The Drag Queen, winner of season 8
- Kim Chi, contestant on season 8
- Raja, winner of season 3, and contestant on All Stars season 7
- Jamal Sims, choreographer and director
- Erika La'Pearl, celebrity make-up artist
- Tokyo Stylez, celebrity hairstylist and wigmaker

Episode 2

- David Benjamin Steinberg, songwriter and music producer

Episode 8

- Zane Phillips, actor
- Froy Gutierrez, actor
- Chris Renfro, actor

Episode 9

- Gabe Lopez, singer/songwriter and producer
- Carlos Basquiat, dancer and choreographer

Episode 11

- Alyssa Edwards, winner of Global All Stars, and contestant on season 5 and All Stars season 2

Episode 14

- Zane Phillips, actor

Episode 16

- Bob The Drag Queen, winner of season 8
- Kim Chi, contestant on season 8
- Raja, winner of season 3, and contestant on All Stars season 7
- Miley Cyrus, singer, songwriter, and actress
- Crystal Envy, contestant and Miss Congeniality on season 17
- Norvina, president of Anastasia Beverly Hills
- Onya Nurve, winner of season 17

== Episodes ==
No. overall	No. in season	Title	Original release date
239	1	"You Can't Keep a Good Drag Queen Down!"	January 2, 2026
Fourteen new queens enter the workroom. For the first mini-challenge, the queens act as a scream queen along with masked dancers. Kenya Pleaser wins the mini-challenge. For the main challenge, the queens design and create outfits using leftover materials from previous seasons. On the runway, category is Reclaim, Renew, Rejoice. Jane Don't, Nini Coco, and Vita VonTesse Starr receive positive critiques. Juicy Love Dion, Kenya Pleaser, and Mandy Mango receive negative critiques. It is then announced that Kenya Pleaser and Mandy Mango are the bottom queens of the week, and that there will be no elimination, and instead, Nini Coco and Vita VonTesse Starr are the top two queens of the week and will lip-sync for the win. Nini Coco and Vita VonTesse Starr lip-synced to "Enough (Miami)" by Cardi B. After the lip-sync, Nini Coco is announced as the winner of the challenge.: Guest Judge: Cardi B; Alternating Judge: Carson Kressley; Mini-Challenge: Act as a scream queen with masked dancers; Mini-Challenge Winner: Kenya Pleaser; Mini-Challenge Prize: $2,500 cash tip; Main Challenge: Create an outfit made out of leftover materials from previous seasons; Runway Theme: Reclaim, Renew, Rejoice; Top Two: Nini Coco and Vita VonTesse Starr; Lip-sync Song: "Enough (Miami)" by Cardi B; Challenge Winner: Nini Coco; Challenge Prize: $5,000 cash prize; Eliminated: None
240	2	"Q-Pop Girl Groups"	January 9, 2026
For this week's main challenge, the queens write, record, and perform verses as 70's and 80's girl groups.: Team Studio 50-Whores - Athena Dion, DD Fuego, Darlene Mitchell, and Mandy Mango performing "Funk Almighty"; Team Glam! - Ciara Myst, Kenya Pleaser, Mia Starr, Myki Meeks, and Nini Coco performing "Go-Go-Go!"; Team The Tucked Aways - Briar Blush, Discord Addams, Jane Don't, Juicy Love Dion, and Vita VonTesse Starr performing "Cherries"; On the runway, category is Your Neck, Your Back, Your Pussy, and Your Crack. Mia Starr and Jane Don't receive positive critiques, with Jane Don't winning the challenge. Team Studio 50-Whores is the losing team. Athena Dion, DD Fuego, Darlene Mitchell, and Mandy Mango receive negative critiques, with Athena Dion and Darlene Mitchell being safe. DD Fuego and Mandy Mango lip-sync to "Too Much" by Dove Cameron. Mandy Mango wins the lip-sync and DD Fuego is the first queen to sashay away.: Guest Judge: Dove Cameron; Alternating Judge: Ts Madison; Main Challenge: Write, record, and perform verses as 70s and 80s inspired girl groups; Runway Theme: Your Neck, Your Back, Your Pussy, and Your Crack; Challenge Winner: Jane Don't; Challenge Prize: $5,000 cash prize; Bottom Two: DD Fuego and Mandy Mango; Lip-sync Song: "Too Much" by Dove Cameron; Eliminated: DD Fuego; Farewell Message: "DIVAS, HATE THIS FOR ME. BUT LOVE ALL OF YOU. ¡gracias! XO DD Fuego"
241	3	"RDR Live Returns!"	January 16, 2026
For this week's main challenge, the queens perform in a sketch comedy of RDR Live.: Host/Monologue - Athena Dion and Briar Blush; Tuckahoe County Fair - Darlene Mitchell, Discord Addams, Mandy Mango and Mia Starr; Lipstick Lovers - Athena Dion, Kenya Pleaser, Nini Coco and Vita VonTesse Starr; QNN News - Briar Blush, Ciara Myst and Jane Don't; Young Michelle - Juicy Love Dion and Myki Meeks; On the runway, category is Animal Attraction. Darlene Mitchell, Jane Don't and Juicy Love Dion receive positive critiques, with Juicy Love Dion winning the challenge. Briar Blush, Mandy Mango and Vita VonTesse Starr receive negative critiques with Vita VonTesse Starr being declared safe. Briar Blush and Mandy Mango lipsync to "Love in Real Life" by Lizzo. Briar Blush wins the lipsync and Mandy Mango sashays away.: Guest Judge: Sarah Sherman; Alternating Judge: Ts Madison; Main Challenge: Perform in a sketch comedy of RDR Live; Runway Theme: Animal Attraction; Challenge Winner: Juicy Love Dion; Challenge Prize: $5,000 cash prize; Bottom Two: Briar Blush and Mandy Mango; Lip-sync Song: "Love in Real Life" by Lizzo; Eliminated: Mandy Mango; Farewell Message: "HAVE FUN LIKE A FILIPINA STAY SWEET LIKE A MANGO. BUT DON'T FORGET M BABY! Take care of yourself and LOVE YOURSELF. Love you all so much. Thank you for everything 💋 XOXO Mandy Mango"
242	4	"Red Carpet Mash Up"	January 23, 2026
For this week's main challenge the queens must create show-stopping looks inspired by a mash-up of two different legendary red carpet looks. The queens have to partner up with their best friend in the competition, to be compared for their looks later by the judges. The mash-up's and pairings are: Lil Nas X (2020 Grammy's) X Rihanna (2015 Met Gala): Briar Blush vs. Juicy Love Dion; Cher (1986 Oscar's) X Sarah Paulson (Ocean's 8 Premiere): Discord Addams vs. Jane Don't; Jennifer Lopez (2000 Grammy's) X Nicki Minaj (2011 Grammy's): Myki Meeks vs. Nini Coco; Lady Gaga (2010 VMA's) X Britney Spears and Justin Timberlake (2001 AMA's): Ciara Myst vs. Kenya Pleaser; Katy Perry (2019 Met Gala) X Lil' Kim (1999 VMA's): Mia Starr vs. Vita VonTesse Starr; Kim Kardashian (2013 Met Gala) X Zendaya (Dune 2 Premiere): Athena Dion vs. Darlene Mitchell; On the runway, category is Red Carpet Mashups. Athena Dion, Ciara Myst, Jane Don't, Juicy Love Dion, Nini Coco and Vita VonTesse Starr all win each of their battles. Ciara Myst, Jane Don't and Vita VonTesse Starr receive extra positive critiques for their looks, with Vita VonTesse Starr winning the challenge. Briar Blush, Discord Addams, and Kenya Pleaser receive negative critiques with Discord Addams being declared safe. Briar Blush and Kenya Pleaser lipsync to "Lights Camera Action" by Kylie Minogue. Kenya Pleaser wins the lipsync and Briar Blush sashays away.: Guest Judge: Annaleigh Ashford; Alternating Judge: Law Roach; Main Challenge: In rival pairs create a show-stopping look inspired by a mash-up of two different legendary red carpet looks.; Runway Theme: Red Carpet Mashups; Challenge Winner: Vita VonTesse Starr; Challenge Prize: $5,000 cash prize; Bottom Two: Briar Blush and Kenya Pleaser; Lip-sync Song: "Lights Camera Action" by Kylie Minogue; Eliminated: Briar Blush; Farewell Message: "Actually I change my mind, Keep recording me. PS.. I like you guys♡ Briar"
243	5	"The Rate-A-Queen Talent Show, Part 1"	January 30, 2026
For this week's main challenge the queens split up into two groups, with six of them performing in the Rate-A-Queen Talent Show.: Ciara Myst - Spoken Word Poetry; Juicy Love Dion - Original Song/Dancing; Nini Coco - Lip Sync Performance; Vita VonTesse Starr - Original Song; Darlene Mitchell - Comedy Performance; Mia Starr - Original Song/Dancing; On the runway category is Not Today, Satin. The queens who didn't perform in this episode rank the performances using Rate-A-Queen. It is then announced that Juicy Love Dion and Mia Starr are the top two queens of the week and will lipsync for the win. The other group of queens ranked Ciara Myst the lowest, meaning that she will lipsync for her life next episode. Juicy Love Dion and Mia Starr lipsync to "Pretty Ugly" by Zara Larsson. After an outstanding lip sync RuPaul declares that it's a tie, with both Juicy Love Dion and Mia Starr winning the challenge.: Guest Judge: Zara Larsson; Alternating Judge: Ross Matthews; Main Challenge: Perform in the Rate-A-Queen Talent Show Part 1; Runway Theme: Not Today Satin; Top Two: Juicy Love Dion and Mia Starr; Lip-sync Song: "Pretty Ugly" by Zara Larsson; Challenge Winners: Juicy Love Dion and Mia Starr; Challenge Prize: $5,000 cash prize ($2,500 for each); Eliminated: None
244	6	"The Rate-A-Queen Talent Show, Part 2"	February 6, 2026
For this week's main challenge the remaining five queens perform a Talent in the Rate-A-Queen Talent Show Part 2.: Myki Meeks - Comedy Burlesque; Athena Dion - Original Song; Kenya Pleaser - Original Song/Color Guard; Jane Don't - Original Song/Comedy Performance; Discord Addams - Original Song; On the runway category is Shake, Shake, Shake. The queens who didn't perform in this episode rank the performances using Rate-A-Queen. It is then announced that Athena Dion and Jane Don't are the top two queens of the week. They lipsync for the win to "Jerkin'" by Amyl and the Sniffers. Athena Dion wins the lipsync and thus the challenge. Myki Meeks was ranked the lowest by the other queens, meaning that she will lipsync for her life against the bottom queen from the week before, Ciara Myst. Ciara Myst and Myki Meeks lipsync to "Toxic" by Britney Spears. Myki Meeks wins the lipsync and Ciara Myst sashays away.: Guest Judge: Amy Taylor; Alternating Judge: Ross Matthews; Main Challenge: Perform in the Rate-A-Queen Talent Show Part 2; Runway Theme: Shake, Shake, Shake; Top Two: Athena Dion and Jane Don't; Lip-sync Song: "Jerkin'" by Amyl and the Sniffers; Challenge Winner: Athena Dion; Challenge Prize: $5,000 cash prize; Bottom Two: Ciara Myst and Myki Meeks; Lip-sync Song: "Toxic" by Britney Spears; Eliminated: Ciara Myst; Farewell Message: Hey Divas! Well... they got me gal!?! Guess you all are going to need another therapist while, I'm gone. You all are stars, but consider bigger lips! <3 CIARA
245	7	"Drag Queens for Change"	February 13, 2026
For this week's main challenge the queens create twisted parodies of political ads by taking a stand on political propositions. They are divided into pairs, with one queen arguing in support of the proposition, and the other arguing against it.: Proposition C - Jane Don't and Kenya Pleaser; Proposition DD - Juicy Love Dion and Mia Starr; Proposition 4Real - Darlene Mitchell and Vita VonTesse Starr; Proposition 6969 - Athena Dion and Myki Meeks; Proposition Kiki - Discord Addams and Nini Coco; On the runway category is I Can See Right Through Ha. Darlene Mitchell, Jane Don't and Myki Meeks receive positive critiques, with Myki Meeks winning the challenge. Juicy Love Dion, Mia Starr and Vita VonTesse Starr receive negative critiques, with Mia Starr being declared safe. Juicy Love Dion and Vita VonTesse Starr lipsync to "Houdini" by Dua Lipa. Juicy Love Dion wins the lipsync and Vita VonTesse Starr sashays away.: Guest Judge: Leland; Alternating Judge: Jamal Sims; Main Challenge: In pairs, create comedic political ads for political issues; Runway Theme: I Can See Right Through Ha; Challenge Winner: Myki Meeks; Challenge Prize: $5,000 cash prize; Bottom Two: Juicy Love Dion and Vita VonTesse Starr; Lip-sync Song: "Houdini" by Dua Lipa; Eliminated: Vita VonTesse Starr; Farewell Message: Love all you! VITA VITA VITA
246	8	"Snatch Game of Love: Island Edition"	February 20, 2026
For this week's main challenge the queens play a special version of the Snatch Game, the "Snatch Game of Love Island". The cast consisted of: Athena Dion as Greta Feta Onassis (made-up character; loosely based on Tina Onassis Niarchos); Darlene Mitchell as Mrs. Claus; Discord Addams as The Pope; Jane Don't as Truman Capote; Juicy Love Dion as JoJo Siwa; Kenya Pleaser as Lizzo; Mia Starr as Bloody Mary; Myki Meeks as Drew Barrymore; Nini Coco as Sir David Attenborough; On the runway category is 80s Ladies, with each queen taking inspiration from a 80s icon. Jane Don't, Myki Meeks and Nini Coco receive positive critiques with Nini Coco winning the challenge. Juicy Love Dion, Kenya Pleaser and Mia Starr receive negative critiques with Juicy Love Dion being declared safe. Kenya Pleaser and Mia Starr lipsync to "Head Over Heels" by The Go-Go's. Kenya Pleaser wins the lipsync and Mia Starr sashays away.: Guest Judge: Brooke Shields; Alternating Judge: Carson Kressley; Snatch Game Bachelors: Zane Phillips, Froy Gutierrez and Chris Renfro; Main Challenge: Compete in the Snatch Game of Love Island; Runway Theme: 80s Ladies; Challenge Winner: Nini Coco; Challenge Prize: $5,000 cash prize; Bottom Two: Kenya Pleaser and Mia Starr; Lip-sync Song: "Head Over Heels" by The Go-Go's; Eliminated: Mia Starr; Farewell Message: BIG BACKS TAKE OVER ♡ Kenya I Love you and so proud of you sister! Athena & Juicy, TAKE IT HOME ♡ Love Mama Mia
247	9	"Fannie: The Hard Knock Ball Rusical"	February 27, 2026
For this week's mini challenge the queens play the game "Grindr, I Hardly Know Her". Discord Addams and Kenya Pleaser win the mini challenge. For this week's main challenge the queens perform in "Fannie: The Hard Knock Ball Rusical".: Athena Dion as Mama Bigbux; Darlene Mitchell as Brandy; Discord Addams as Lil' Salty; Jane Don't as Miss Shenanigan; Juicy Love Dion as Cecile Cartier; Kenya Pleaser as Grace Cartier; Myki Meeks as Fanny; Nini Coco as Big Peppa; On the runway, category is Beige Against The Machine. Jane Don't, Kenya Pleaser and Myki Meeks receive positive critiques with Jane Don't winning the challenge. Athena Dion and Juicy Love Dion receive negative critiques with both of them being up for elimination. Athena Dion and Juicy Love Dion lipsync to "Call Me When You Break Up" by Selena Gomez, Benny Blanco and Gracie Abrams. Juicy Love Dion wins the lipsync and Athena Dion sashays away.: Guest Judge: Benny Blanco; Alternating Judge: Jamal Sims; Mini-Challenge: Grindr, I Hardly Know Her; Mini-Challenge Winners: Discord Addams and Kenya Pleaser; Mini-Challenge Prize: $2,500 cash prize ($1,250 for each); Main Challenge: Perform in "Fannie: The Hard Knock Ball Rusical"; Runway Theme: Beige Against The Machine; Challenge Winner: Jane Don't; Challenge Prize: $5,000 cash prize; Bottom Two: Athena Dion and Juicy Love Dion; Lip-sync Song: "Call Me When You Break Up" by Selena Gomez, Benny Blanco and Gracie Abrams; Eliminated: Athena Dion; Farewell Message: "Ladies remember. The cage you're trapped in... Juicy! BRING IT HOME! I LOVE YOU forever! All of you! Love, Athena Dion."
248	10	"Drag in a Bag"	March 6, 2026
For this week's mini challenge, the queens read each other to filth. Myki Meeks wins the mini challenge. For this week's main challenge, the queens must design a "scrappy" party dress using materials found in suitcases belonging to the previously eliminated contestants.: Myki Meeks - Briar Blush's suitcase; Kenya Pleaser - Vita VonTesse Starr's suitcase; Juicy Love Dion - Mia Starr's suitcase; Jane Don't - Ciara Myst's suitcase; Darlene Mitchell - Athena Dion's suitcase; Nini Coco - DD Fuego's suitcase; Discord Addams - Mandy Mango's suitcase; On the runway, category is Party. All the queens receive widely positive critiques from the judges. Jane Don't and Kenya Pleaser are announced as the top two queens of the week, with all the other queens being declared safe and no one being eliminated. Jane Don't and Kenya Pleaser lipsync to "Feels Like Another One" by Patti LaBelle. Jane Don't wins the lipsync and thus the challenge.: Guest Judge: Iman; Alternating Judge: Carson Kressley; Mini-Challenge: Reading is Fundamental; Mini-Challenge Winner: Myki Meeks; Mini-Challenge Prize: $2,500 cash prize; Main Challenge: Design a festive look using materials provided by the eliminated queens.; Runway Theme: Party; Top Two: Jane Don't and Kenya Pleaser; Challenge Winner: Jane Don't; Challenge Prize: $5,000 cash prize; Lip-sync Song: "Feels Like Another One" by Patti LaBelle; Eliminated: None
249	11	"A Toast to Alyssa Edwards"	March 13, 2026
For this week's mini challenge, the queens film advertisements for Scent Bird perfumes. Myki Meeks wins the mini challenge. For this week's main challenge, the queens write and perform a roast and toast to Alyssa Edwards. On the runway, category is Swept Away. Darlene Mitchell, Jane Don't and Myki Meeks receive positive critiques from the judges, with Darlene Mitchell winning the challenge. Discord Addams, Juicy Love Dion, Kenya Pleaser and Nini Coco receive negative critiques, with Discord Addams and Nini Coco being declared safe. Juicy Love Dion and Kenya Pleaser lipsync to "Total Eclipse of the Heart" by Bonnie Tyler. Juicy Love Dion wins the lipsync and Kenya Pleaser sashays away.: Guest Judge: Atsuko Okatsuka; Alternating Judge: Ross Matthews; Mini-Challenge: Advertise fragrances provided by Scent Bird; Mini-Challenge Winner: Myki Meeks; Mini-Challenge Prize: $2,500 cash prize; Main Challenge: Write and perform a roast and toast to Alyssa Edwards.; Runway Theme: Swept Away; Challenge Winner: Darlene Mitchell; Challenge Prize: $5,000 cash prize; Bottom Two: Juicy Love Dion and Kenya Pleaser; Lip-sync Song: "Total Eclipse of the Heart" by Bonnie Tyler; Eliminated: Kenya Pleaser; Farewell Message: "Love All of you! ♡ Good luck Can ya take it I'm Gone 💋 — KP"
250	12	"Mammas, Don't Let Your Babies Grow Up to Be Drag Queens"	March 20, 2026
For this week's mini-challenge, the queens must get into quick cowgirl drag and engage in a bouncy horse race. Discord Addams wins the mini-challenge. For the main challenge, the queens must make over rodeo riders into members of their own drag family. On the runway, category is Drag Family Resemblance. Darlene Mitchell, Juicy Love Dion and Myki Meeks receive positive critiques, with Myki Meeks winning the challenge. Discord Addams, Jane Don't and Nini Coco receive negative critiques, with Jane Don't being declared safe. Discord Addams and Nini Coco lipsync to "We Can't Be Friends (Wait for Your Love)" by Ariana Grande. Nini Coco wins the lipsync and Discord Addams sashays away.: Guest Judge: Danielle Pinnock; Alternating Judge: Law Roach; Mini-Challenge: Get into quick cowgirl drag and race on bouncy horses; Mini-Challenge Winner: Discord Addams; Mini-Challenge Prize: $2,500 cash prize; Main Challenge: Makeover rodeo riders into members of your drag family; Runway Theme: Drag Family Resemblance; Challenge Winner: Myki Meeks; Challenge Prize: $5,000 cash prize and $2,500 cash prize for her makeover partner; Bottom Two: Discord Addams and Nini Coco; Lip-sync Song: "We Can’t Be Friends (Wait for Your Love)" by Ariana Grande; Eliminated: Discord Addams; Farewell Message: "In DiscordLand I could be in the top next week!! Love y'all SOO much! You've changed my life! 💋 ♡ Discord / Eat the Rich! BLM Protect Trans Lives!"
251	13	"Karens Gone Wild"	March 27, 2026
For this week's mini-challenge, the queens have a bitchfest with puppets. Nobody wins the mini-challenge, and the crew receives 2,500 dollars for watching the challenge unedited. For the main challenge, the queens must improv in "Karens Gone Wild" with RuPaul as their scene partner. The roles are as follows: Jane Don't as Late For Her Flight Karen; Darlene Mitchell as Shoplifting Karen; Juicy Love Dion as Parking Spot Karen; Myki Meeks as Traffic Stop Karen; Nini Coco as HOA Karen; On the runway, category is From Wholesome to Folsom. Darlene Mitchell, Juicy Love Dion and Myki Meeks receive positive critiques, with Myki Meeks winning the challenge. Jane Don't and Nini Coco receive negative critiques, and are declared the bottom two. They lipsync to "Garden of Eden" by Lady Gaga. Nini Coco wins the lipsync and Jane Don't sashays away.: Guest Judge: Julianne Nicholson; Alternating Judge: Ts Madison; Mini-Challenge: Everybody Loves Puppets; Mini-Challenge Loser: The Crew; Mini-Challenge Consolation: $2,500 cash prize to split; Main Challenge: Improv in "Karens Gone Wild" with Rupaul; Runway Theme: From Wholesome to Folsom; Challenge Winner: Myki Meeks; Challenge Prize: $5,000 cash prize; Bottom Two: Jane Don’t and Nini Coco; Lip-sync Song: "Garden of Eden" by Lady Gaga; Eliminated: Jane Don't; Farewell Message: "Love you all so much. Thank you for everything. Til we meet again on the road. Love you, Love you, Love you 💋"
252	14	"Good Morning Bitches"	April 3, 2026
For this week's main challenge the queens pair up to live host the fictional morning talk-show "Good Morning Bitches".: Juicy Love Dion and Nini Coco host the 8th hour; Darlene Mitchell and Myki Meeks as host the 9th hour; On the runway, category is Drag Excellence. Darlene Mitchell and Myki Meeks receive positive critiques with both of them winning the challenge. Juicy Love Dion and Nini Coco receive negative critiques with both of them being up for elimination. Juicy Love Dion and Nini Coco lipsync to "Super Graphic Ultra Modern Girl" by Chappell Roan. Nini Coco wins the lipsync and Juicy Love Dion sashays away.: Guest Judge: Teyana Taylor; Alternating Judge: Ross Matthews; Main Challenge: Perform in pairs on "Good Morning Bitches"; Runway Theme: Drag Excellence; Challenge Winners: Darlene Mitchell and Myki Meeks; Challenge Prize: $5,000 cash prize split between the two winners; Bottom Two: Juicy Love Dion and Nini Coco; Lip-sync Song: "Super Graphic Ultra Modern Girl" by Chappell Roan; Eliminated: Juicy Love Dion; Farewell Message: "The juice is officially gone! Love you girls so much!!! Congratulations!!! - Love, Juicy 💋"
253	15	"All RuPaul-A-Paruza Smackdown"	April 10, 2026
Alternating Judge: Jamal Sims; Challenge Winner: Juicy Love Dion; Challenge Prize: $50,000 cash prize
254	16	"Grand Finale"	April 17, 2026
All the queens return for the grand finale. The final three queens then perform to a song that was written specifically for them. Darlene Mitchell lip-syncs to "Cooking With Gas", Myki Meeks lip-syncs to "Versatile" and Nini Coco lip-syncs to "Stimulated". After their performances, It is announced that Jane Don’t is this season's Miss Congeniality. RuPaul tells the queens that only two queens will be advancing to the final lip-sync of the season. It is announced that the final two queens are Myki Meeks and Nini Coco, meaning Darlene Mitchell is eliminated. Myki Meeks and Nini Coco lip-sync to "Every Girl You've Ever Loved" by Miley Cyrus featuring Naomi Campbell. It is announced that Myki Meeks is the winner, leaving Nini Coco as the runner-up.: Alternating Judges: Carson Kressley and Jamal Sims; Final Three: Darlene Mitchell, Myki Meeks, Nini Coco; Eliminated: Darlene Mitchell; Miss Congeniality: Jane Don't; Final Two: Myki Meeks and Nini Coco; Lip-Sync Song: "Every Girl You've Ever Loved" by Miley Cyrus featuring Naomi Campbell; Runner-up: Nini Coco; Winner of RuPaul's Drag Race Season Eighteen: Myki Meeks

== Ratings ==
The season 18 premiere,You Can't Keep a Good Drag Queen Down!, set an all-time record for the franchise, delivering the highest season premiere rating in Drag Race history.

Viewership and ratings per episode of RuPaul's Drag Race season 18
No.	Title	Air date	Rating (18–49)	Viewers (millions)	Ref.
1	"You Can't Keep a Good Drag Queen Down!"	January 2, 2026	0.22	0.697	
2	"Q-Pop Girl Groups"	January 9, 2026	0.14	0.356	
3	"RDR Live Returns!"	January 16, 2026	0.16	0.573	
4	"Red Carpet Mash Up"	January 23, 2026	0.18	0.656	
5	"The Rate-A-Queen Talent Show, Part 1"	January 30, 2026	0.17	0.699	
6	"The Rate-A-Queen Talent Show, Part 2"	February 6, 2026	0.17	0.457	
7	"Drag Queens for Change"	February 13, 2026	0.13	0.434	
8	"Snatch Game of Love: Island Edition"	February 20, 2026	0.20	0.533	
9	"Fannie: The Hard Knock Ball Rusical"	February 27, 2026	0.19	0.493	
10	"Drag In A Bag"	March 6, 2026	0.19	0.449	
11	"A Toast to Alyssa Edwards"	March 13, 2026	0.21	0.490	
12	"Mammas, Don't Let Your Babies Grow Up to Be Drag Queens"	March 20, 2026	0.17	0.469	
13	"Karens Gone Wild"	March 27, 2026	0.20	0.479	
14	"Good Morning Bitches"	April 3, 2026	0.16	0.426	
