= Onya Nurve =

American drag performer (born 1993)

- Born: Justin C. Woody; May 26, 1993 (age 33); Canton, Ohio, U.S.
- Education: Cleveland Institute of Art (BFA)
- Occupation: Drag queen
- Years active: 2021–present
- Website: onyanurve.com

Justin C. Woody (born May 26, 1993), popularly known as Onya Nurve, is an American drag performer. She is best known for winning the seventeenth season of RuPaul's Drag Race (2025).

== Early life ==
Justin Woody was born and raised in Canton, Ohio. He attended Perry High School. His first theatrical performance was around the age of 17, where he played the non-speaking role of Tom Robinson's son in a production of To Kill a Mockingbird. He was a high school speech and debate champion, having won the 2011 State of Ohio Speech and Debate competition. He auditioned for the eleventh season of American Idol at Heinz Field (now Acrisure Stadium) in Pittsburgh, Pennsylvania that same year. He got his BFA in painting at Cleveland Institute of Art in 2015. He completed a six-month residency at the Praxis Fiber Workshop in Cleveland which included a two-man art show, NAPS, alongside Marcus Brathwaite. Prior to appearing on Drag Race, he worked at Doinks Burger Joint.

== Career ==
Onya Nurve began performing as a drag queen in 2021. Before Drag Race, she was named Cleveland's best drag performer in the Cleveland Scene's 2023 Best of Cleveland issue and won the title of Mx. Zephyr in the first Zephyr Drag Takeover competition in Kent a year prior. She has additionally been crowned Miss Addicted to Glamour Newcomer. Onya Nurve is the inaugural ArtReach fellow for Haus of Transcendent, a Cleveland-based LGBTQ nonprofit. As a stage actor, she has portrayed Donkey in Shrek the Musical at the Near West Theatre and the Mercury Summer Stock in addition to Oscar D'Armano in The Wild Party at the Blank Canvas Theatre, as well as Lumière in Beauty and the Beast, Snoopy in You're a Good Man, Charlie Brown, Jesus in Jesus Christ Superstar, and Gator in Memphis, all at the Canton Players Guild. In 2018, she portrayed the character of Youth in the Karamu House's production of Passing Strange. In 2024, she served as a consultant for the Dobama Theatre's production of AT THE WAKE OF A DEAD DRAG QUEEN. She has described herself as the "Andy Warhol of the drag scene".

Onya Nurve competed in and won the seventeenth season of competition series RuPaul's Drag Race (2025), where the drag performer was crowned as the Next Drag Superstar for the United States. She was the second contestant to represent Cleveland after Akashia, who competed in its first season. Throughout the season, Onya Nurve won four main challenges, a record tied with only a few other queens throughout the franchise.

The challenges included an advertisement parody where she performed a jazz–monologue based on Laganja Estranja's stand-up comedy routine from the sixth season, acting in a sketch inspired by screenwriter Truman Capote, and lastly a narrative interpretive dance challenge alongside Lexi Love. For the Snatch Game challenge, Onya Nurve won the episode with Entertainment Weekly seeing potential in her after "matching her ace comedic skills" and "embodied [the] beloved Hollywood staple," actor and comedian Eddie Murphy. Her Instagram following grew by 2,791 percent as the show aired.

In July 2025, she was announced to portray Lola in the 2025 North American tour of Kinky Boots. Four months later, in November, she was confirmed by the show's production team to no longer be part of the cast. No explanation for her departure was given.

== Personal life ==
Woody is based in Cleveland.

== Discography ==
=== Singles ===
List of singles as lead artist, showing year released, and album name
Title	Year	Album	Writer(s)	Producers(s)	Ref.
"In and Out"	2025	Non-album single	Justin Carlo Woody and Charles Boyd	Husk Pesci	
"It Do Take Nurve"	2025	Non-album single	Brett McLaughlin, Justin Woody	Leland, Gabe Lopez	

== Filmography ==
=== Television ===
List of television credits, with selected details
Title	Year	Role	Ref.
RuPaul's Drag Race	2025	Winner	
RuPaul's Drag Race: Untucked!	2025	Winner	

== See also ==
- List of people from Cleveland

Awards and achievements
Preceded by Nymphia Wind	Winner of RuPaul's Drag Race; US season 17	Succeeded by Myki Meeks
