= Mia Starr =

American entertainer

- Born: Mikey Pesante; Florida, U.S.
- Occupations: Drag performer; dancer; choreographer

Mia Starr is the stage name of Mikey Pesante, an American drag performer, dancer, and choreographer who competed on the eighteenth season of RuPaul's Drag Race.

== Career ==
Starr was an alternate on season seventeen and then competed on the eighteenth season of RuPaul's Drag Race. She was eliminated on the Snatch Game episode, placing 9th overall. After her elimination, Miami New Times said, "Starr's run ended earlier than she and South Florida hoped, but she made a huge impact on the competition during her time there. After a decade-long break from drag, Starr entered the Werkroom as a star and strutted from background dancer to the spotlight."

Outside of drag, Pesante has been a backup dancer for artists like Britney Spears, Jennifer Lopez, Rihanna and Shakira. He has also been a contestant on The Voice and America's Best Dance Crew.

== Personal life ==
Pesante began doing drag at the age of 17. He is of Croatian and Puerto Rican descent, grew up in West Palm Beach, Florida graduating from Palm Beach Lakes Community High School. as of 2025, he is living in Port St. Lucie, Florida.

== Filmography ==
=== Film ===
Year	Title	Role	Notes
2013	I Am Britney Jean	Himself	as Mikey Pesante

=== Television ===
Year	Title	Role	Notes
2018	Love & Hip Hop: Hollywood	Himself	as Mikey Pesante; Season 5, Episode 8: "Sex, Lies & Videotape"
2026	RuPaul's Drag Race (season 18)	Contestant	9th place
2026	RuPaul's Drag Race: Untucked (season 17)	Herself	8 episodes

=== Web series ===
Year	Title	Role	Notes
2026	Whatcha Packin'	Herself	Season 20, Episode 6
2026	Hello Hello Hello	Herself	Season 2, Episode 6

=== Music videos ===
Year	Title	Artist	Notes
2017	"Havana"	Camila Cabello featuring Young Thug	as Mikey Pesante
2018	"Aileen"	Willam	as Mikey Pesante
