= Whatcha Packin' =

American web series

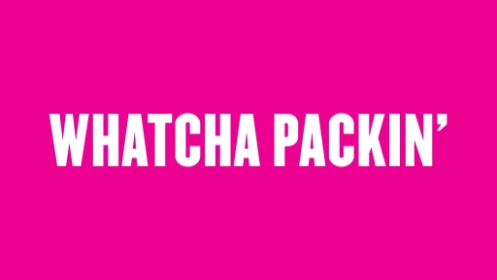
- Title card for season 11
- Genre: Aftershow, Talk show
- Presented by: Michelle Visage
- Country of origin: United States
- Original language: English

Original release
- Network: YouTube
- Release: February 25, 2014 – present

Related
- RuPaul's Drag Race; RuPaul's Drag Race All Stars; RuPaul's Drag Race Down Under

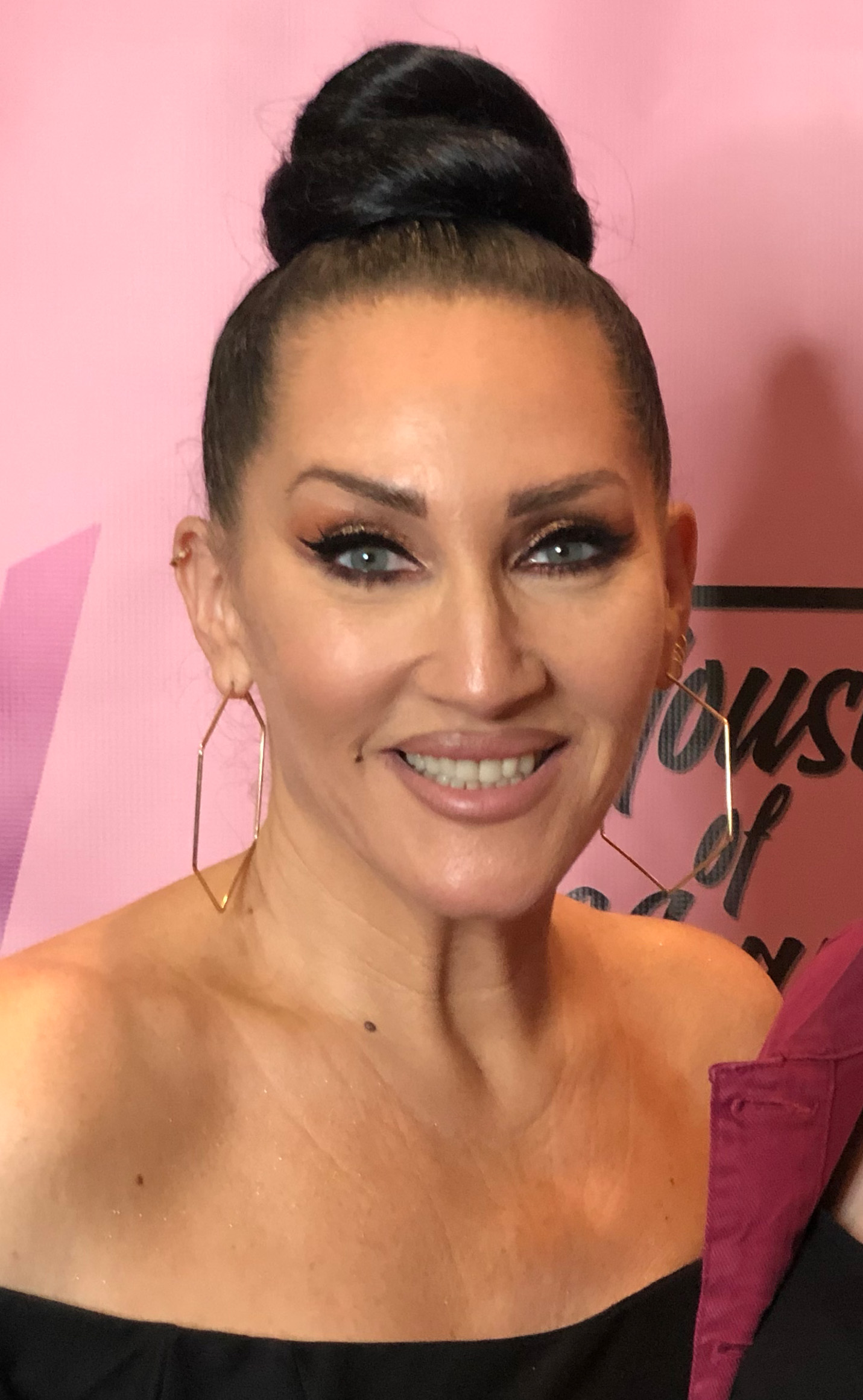
The show is hosted by Michelle Visage.

Whatcha Packin' is an aftershow for RuPaul's Drag Race and its All Stars and Down Under spin-offs, hosted by Michelle Visage, who acts as a main judge for all three series. Its first season was aired in conjunction with the sixth season of RuPaul's Drag Race.

== Format ==
Whatcha Packin' features Visage interviewing each contestant on a particular season as they are eliminated, or, in the case of finalists, before the season finale airs. The show is an opportunity for the contestant to discuss their drag, their journey in the competition, and their experience after filming the show, as well as showcase some runway looks they were unable to wear on the show.

The series is sometimes known by alternative names. For the second season of RuPaul's Drag Race All Stars it was called The Final Lap, whereas for the first two seasons of RuPaul's Drag Race Down Under it was known as How's Your Head, Queen?.

== Episodes ==
| Season | Episodes | Drag Race season | First released | Last released | Ref |
|---|---|---|---|---|---|
| 1 | 13 | RuPaul's Drag Race season 6 | February 25, 2014 | May 20, 2014 | |
| 2 | 13 | RuPaul's Drag Race season 7 | March 3, 2015 | May 19, 2015 | |
| 3 | 11 | RuPaul's Drag Race season 8 | March 7, 2016 | May 17, 2016 | |
| 4 | 9 | RuPaul's Drag Race All Stars season 2 | August 25, 2016 | October 14, 2016 | |
| 5 | 14 | RuPaul's Drag Race season 9 | April 3, 2017 | July 2, 2017 | |
| 6 | 10 | RuPaul's Drag Race All Stars season 3 | January 29, 2018 | March 19, 2018 | |
| 7 | 13 | RuPaul's Drag Race season 10 | March 26, 2018 | July 3, 2018 | |
| 8 | 10 | RuPaul's Drag Race All Stars season 4 | December 16, 2018 | February 17, 2019 | |
| 9 | 15 | RuPaul's Drag Race season 11 | March 1, 2019 | May 28, 2019 | |
| 10 | 12 | RuPaul's Drag Race season 12 | March 13, 2020 | May 25, 2020 | |
| 11 | 10 | RuPaul's Drag Race All Stars season 5 | June 5, 2020 | July 24, 2020 | |
| 12 | 13 | RuPaul's Drag Race season 13 | January 23, 2021 | April 19, 2021 | |
| 13 | 6 | RuPaul's Drag Race Down Under season 1 | May 1, 2021 | June 5, 2021 | |
| 14 | 13 | RuPaul's Drag Race All Stars season 6 | June 24, 2021 | September 6, 2021 | |
| 15 | 14 | RuPaul's Drag Race season 14 | January 21, 2022 | April 24, 2022 | |
| 16 | 7 | RuPaul's Drag Race Down Under season 2 | July 30, 2022 | September 10, 2022 | |
| 17 | 16 | RuPaul's Drag Race season 15 | January 6, 2023 | April 11, 2023 | |
| 18 | 14 | RuPaul's Drag Race season 16 | January 20, 2024 | April 17, 2024 | |
| 19 | 14 | RuPaul's Drag Race season 17 | January 17, 2025 | April 17, 2025 | |
| 20 | 14 | RuPaul's Drag Race season 18 | January 9, 2026 | April 16, 2026 | |

== Accolades ==
Whatcha Packin' received a nomination at the 74th Primetime Creative Arts Emmy Awards for Outstanding Short Form Nonfiction or Reality Series in 2022. Visage was nominated as a producer of the series.
