= RuPaul's Drag Race: Untucked =

- Genre: Reality television
- Country of origin: United States
- Original language: English
- No. of seasons: 17
- No. of episodes: 210

Production
- Running time: 20 minutes

Original release
- Network: Logo TV (2010–2014); YouTube (2015–2017); VH1 (2018–2022); MTV (2023–present)
- Release: February 1, 2010 – present

Related
- RuPaul's Drag Race

RuPaul's Drag Race: Untucked! (often shortened to Untucked!) is a spin-off of the American reality competition RuPaul's Drag Race, currently airing on the cable channel MTV. The program debuted on Logo in the United States on February 1, 2010, as a companion show launched in conjunction with the second season of RuPaul's Drag Race; it moved to WOWPresents' YouTube channel on March 3, 2015, as a web series, coinciding with the debut of the seventh season of the parent series. The series returned to cable television on VH1, on March 22, 2018, coinciding with the tenth season of RuPaul's Drag Race. The show now airs on MTV as of January 6, 2023, in conjunction with the fifteenth season of the main series.

It has been nominated for fourteen Emmy Awards: eight for Outstanding Unstructured Reality Program (one win), and six for Outstanding Picture Editing for an Unstructured Reality Program.

== Format ==
The first season of Drag Race was accompanied by a seven-episode web series, titled Under the Hood of RuPaul's Drag Race. LOGOonline published a webisode of Under the Hood after each episode of Drag Race. In this companion series, RuPaul presents a documentary of contestants' conversations in the green room, replays pertinent moments from Drag Race, and airs deleted footage.

In the second season of Drag Race in 2010, Logo reformatted Under the Hood, increased its production budget, moved it from the web to television, and re-titled it to RuPaul's Drag Race: Untucked. Logo broadcast an episode of Untucked after each episode of Drag Race. Untucked replaces the basic green room of Under the Hood with two decorated rooms that were, until season six, sponsored by Absolut Vodka and Interior Illusions, Inc.: the Interior Illusions Lounge and the Gold Bar. FormDecor sponsored the Lounge for season six. These two backstage areas allow for separate group conversations.

At the start of the seventh season of Drag Race, Untucked reverted to a web series, as part of the World of Wonder YouTube page. Instead of two decorated rooms, Untucked was moved back to one room, an empty backstage space that connects to the main stage and work room, with couches for contestants to chat on. The newly renovated version also follows contestants after their elimination from the show, documenting them packing their belongings and leaving the set, with a move away from focusing on produced drama and conflicts among the cast. The web series format continued for the eighth and ninth seasons. For the show's tenth season, Untucked returned to television, where it aired on VH1 during the 30-minute time slot after the 90-minute episode aired. For Untucked's thirteenth season, the show was filmed in the newly expanded work room in accordance with COVID-19 protocols.

== Series overview ==
Season	Episodes	Originally released			RuPaul's Drag Race season
Season	Episodes	First released	Last released	Network	RuPaul's Drag Race season
1	10	February 1, 2010	April 26, 2010	Logo	2
2	13	January 24, 2011	April 25, 2011	Logo	3
3	11	January 30, 2012	April 23, 2012	Logo	4
4	11	January 28, 2013	April 15, 2013	Logo	5
5	12	February 24, 2014	May 5, 2014	Logo	6
6	12	March 2, 2015	May 18, 2015	WOWPresents/YouTube	7
7	9	March 8, 2016	May 3, 2016	WOWPresents/YouTube	8
8	12	March 25, 2017	June 10, 2017	WOWPresents/YouTube	9
9	12	March 22, 2018	June 14, 2018	VH1	10
10	12	February 28, 2019	May 16, 2019	VH1	11
11	12	February 28, 2020	May 15, 2020	VH1	12
12	14	January 1, 2021	April 10, 2021	VH1	13
13	14	January 7, 2022	April 8, 2022	VH1	14
14	14	January 6, 2023	March 31, 2023	MTV	15
15	14	January 5, 2024	April 5, 2024	MTV	16
16	14	January 3, 2025	April 4, 2025	MTV	17
17	14	January 2, 2026	April 3, 2026	MTV	18

== Adaptations ==
=== RuPaul's Drag Race All Stars: Untucked! ===
The first season of RuPaul's Drag Race All Stars featured an Untucked! aftershow, similar to regular seasons. Starting with the second season of All Stars, the format required contestants to be eliminated by the top queen and meant judges' deliberations while contestants untucked were unnecessary. The fifth season of All Stars saw the return of Untucked! alongside a new elimination format.

Season	Episodes	Originally released			RuPaul's Drag Race All Stars season
Season	Episodes	First released	Last released	Network	RuPaul's Drag Race All Stars season
1	6	October 22, 2012	November 26, 2012	Logo	1
2	8	June 5, 2020	July 24, 2020	VH1	5
3	12	June 24, 2021	September 2, 2021	Paramount+	6
4	12	May 20, 2022	July 29, 2022	Paramount+	7
5	12	May 12, 2023	July 21, 2023	Paramount+	8
6	12	May 17, 2024	July 26, 2024	Paramount+	9
7	12	May 9, 2025	July 18, 2025	Paramount+	10
8	12	May 8, 2026	July 17, 2026	Paramount+	11

=== Drag Race Philippines: Untucked! ===
After the teaser trailer for Drag Race Philippines was released, it also announced an Untucked! aftershow, a companion series based on the American show. The companion series showcases the contestants’ conversations, key moments, and deleted footage in a similar documentary format. The behind-the-scenes series began to premiere on August 19, 2022, two days after the main show's premiere.

=== Drag Race Sverige: Untucked! ===
On October 19, 2022, it was confirmed that the Sweden adaptation will have its own companion series called Drag Race Sverige: Untucked! This marks the fourth iteration of the Untucked! aftershow. The Swedish after show premiered the same day as the main show, on March 4, 2023.

=== RuPaul's Drag Race Live Untucked ===
RuPaul's Drag Race Live Untucked premiered on WOW Presents Plus on April 17, 2024.

== Awards and nominations ==
Year	Award	Category	Nominee(s)	Result	Ref.
2016	Realscreen Awards	Digital and Branded Content - Web Series/Programs - Reality & Lifestyle	Randy Barbato, Fenton Bailey, Tom Campbell, RuPaul Charles, Mandy Salangsang, Steven Corfe and Dan Mikaels	Won	
2017	Realscreen Awards	Digital and Branded Content - Web Series/Programs - Reality & Lifestyle	Fenton Bailey, Randy Barbato, Tom Campbell, RuPaul Charles, Steven Corfe and Davis Mikaels	Won	
2017	Primetime Creative Arts Emmy Awards	Outstanding Unstructured Reality Program	Randy Barbato, Fenton Bailey, Tom Campbell, RuPaul Charles, Steven Corfe and Kenneth Leslie	Nominated	
2018	Primetime Creative Arts Emmy Awards	Outstanding Unstructured Reality Program	Randy Barbato, Fenton Bailey, Tom Campbell, RuPaul Charles, Steven Corfe, Kenneth Leslie, Pamela Post, Tim Palazzola, Sam Heng and Thairin Smothers	Nominated	
2018	Primetime Creative Arts Emmy Awards	Outstanding Picture Editing for an Unstructured Reality Program	Lousine Shamamian (for "Untucked –- 10s Across the Board")	Nominated	
2019	Primetime Creative Arts Emmy Awards	Outstanding Unstructured Reality Program	Pamela Post, Tim Palazzola, Randy Barbato, Fenton Bailey, Tom Campbell, RuPaul Charles, San Heng, Steven Corfe, Mandy Salangsang, Kenneth Leslie, Thairin Smothers and Jen Passovoy	Nominated	
2019	Primetime Creative Arts Emmy Awards	Outstanding Picture Editing for an Unstructured Reality Program	Kendra Pasker, Shayna Casey and Stavros Stavropoulos (for "Series Body of Work")	Nominated	
2019	Critics' Choice Real TV Awards	Unstructured Series	Pamela Post, Tim Palazzola, Randy Barbato, Fenton Bailey, Tom Campbell, RuPaul Charles, San Heng, Steven Corfe, Mandy Salangsang, Kenneth Leslie, Thairin Smothers and Jen Passovoy	Nominated	
2020	Primetime Creative Arts Emmy Awards	Outstanding Unstructured Reality Program	Tim Palazzola, Randy Barbato, Fenton Bailey, Tom Campbell, RuPaul Charles, Steven Corfe, Camilo Valdes, Mandy Salangsang, Kenneth Leslie, Thairin Smothers and Jen Passovoy	Nominated	
2020	Primetime Creative Arts Emmy Awards	Outstanding Picture Editing for an Unstructured Reality Program	Kendra Pasker, Yali Sharon and Kate Smith (for "The Ball Ball")	Nominated	
2020	Critics' Choice Real TV Awards	Unstructured Series	Tim Palazzola, Randy Barbato, Fenton Bailey, Tom Campbell, RuPaul Charles, Steven Corfe, Camilo Valdes, Mandy Salangsang, Kenneth Leslie, Thairin Smothers and Jen Passovoy	Nominated	
2021	Primetime Creative Arts Emmy Awards	Outstanding Unstructured Reality Program	Fenton Bailey, Randy Barbato, Tom Campbell, RuPaul Charles, San Heng, Mandy Salangsang, Steven Corfe, Tim Palazzola, Kenneth Leslie, Thairin Smothers and Jen Passovoy	Won	
2021	Primetime Creative Arts Emmy Awards	Outstanding Picture Editing for an Unstructured Reality Program	Kellen Cruden, Yali Sharon and Shayna Casey (for "The Bag Ball")	Nominated	
2021	MTV Movie & TV Awards	Best Fight	Kandy Muse and Tamisha Iman	Nominated	
2021	Critics' Choice Real TV Awards	Best Unstructured Series	Fenton Bailey, Randy Barbato, Tom Campbell, RuPaul Charles, San Heng, Mandy Salangsang, Steven Corfe, Tim Palazzola, Kenneth Leslie, Thairin Smothers and Jen Passovoy	Nominated	
2022	Primetime Creative Arts Emmy Awards	Outstanding Unstructured Reality Program	Fenton Bailey, Randy Barbato, Tom Campbell, RuPaul Charles, San Heng, Mandy Salangsang, Steven Corfe, Tim Palazzola, Kenneth Leslie, Thairin Smothers, Jeremy McGovern and Jen Passovoy	Nominated	
2022	Critics' Choice Real TV Awards	Best Unstructured Series	Fenton Bailey, Randy Barbato, Tom Campbell, RuPaul Charles, San Heng, Mandy Salangsang, Steven Corfe, Tim Palazzola, Kenneth Leslie, Thairin Smothers and Jen Passovoy	Won	
2023	Primetime Creative Arts Emmy Awards	Outstanding Unstructured Reality Program	RuPaul Charles, Randy Barbato, Fenton Bailey, Tom Campbell, Kenneth Leslie, Mandy Salangsang, Steven Corfe, Tim Palazzola, Adam Bronstein, Thairin Smothers, Jeremy McGovern, and Jen Passovoy	Nominated	
2023	Primetime Creative Arts Emmy Awards	Outstanding Picture Editing for an Unstructured Reality Program	Matthew D. Miller and Kellen Cruden (for "The Daytona Wind 2")	Nominated	
2024	Primetime Creative Arts Emmy Awards	Outstanding Unstructured Reality Program	Fenton Bailey, Randy Barbato, Tom Campbell, RuPaul Charles, Kenneth Leslie, Mandy Salangsang, Steven Corfe, Daniel Blau Rogge, Adam Bronstein, Thairin Smothers, Julie Ha, Alicia Gargaro-Magana	Nominated	
2024	Primetime Creative Arts Emmy Awards	Outstanding Picture Editing for an Unstructured Reality Program	Matthew D. Miller and Kellen Cruden (for "Rate-A-Queen")	Nominated	
2025	Primetime Creative Arts Emmy Awards	Outstanding Unstructured Reality Program	Fenton Bailey, Randy Barbato, Tom Campbell, RuPaul Charles, Andrea Van Metter, Mandy Salangsang, Steven Corfe, Daniel Blau Rogge, Natalia James, Thairin Smothers, Julie Ha, Alicia Gargaro-Magana and America Ruiz	Nominated	
2025	Primetime Creative Arts Emmy Awards	Outstanding Picture Editing for an Unstructured Reality Program	Miguel Siqueiros, Jimmy Bazan, and Johanna Gavard (for "Drag Baby Mamas")	Nominated	

== Ratings ==
With the aftershow moving onto MTV, the two-episode premiere from the fourthteenth season of RuPaul's Drag Race: Untucked! attracted respectively 343,000 (0.11) and 230,000 (0.07) total viewers.
