= All Queens Go to Heaven =

- RuPaul's Drag Race episode
- Episode no.: Season 15; Episode 3
- Presented by: RuPaul
- Original air date: January 13, 2023

Guest appearance
- Maren Morris

Episode chronology
← Previous "One Night Only, Part 2"	Next → "Supersized Snatch Game"
- RuPaul's Drag Race season 15

"All Queens Go to Heaven" is the third episode of the fifteenth season of the American television series RuPaul's Drag Race. It originally aired on January 13, 2023. The episode's main challenge tasks the contestants with creating infomercials for their vision of the afterlife. American country singer Maren Morris is a guest judge. Sasha Colby wins the main challenge. Princess Poppy is eliminated from the competition after placing in the bottom and losing a lip-sync against Amethyst to "Ain't No Mountain High Enough" by Diana Ross.

== Episode ==
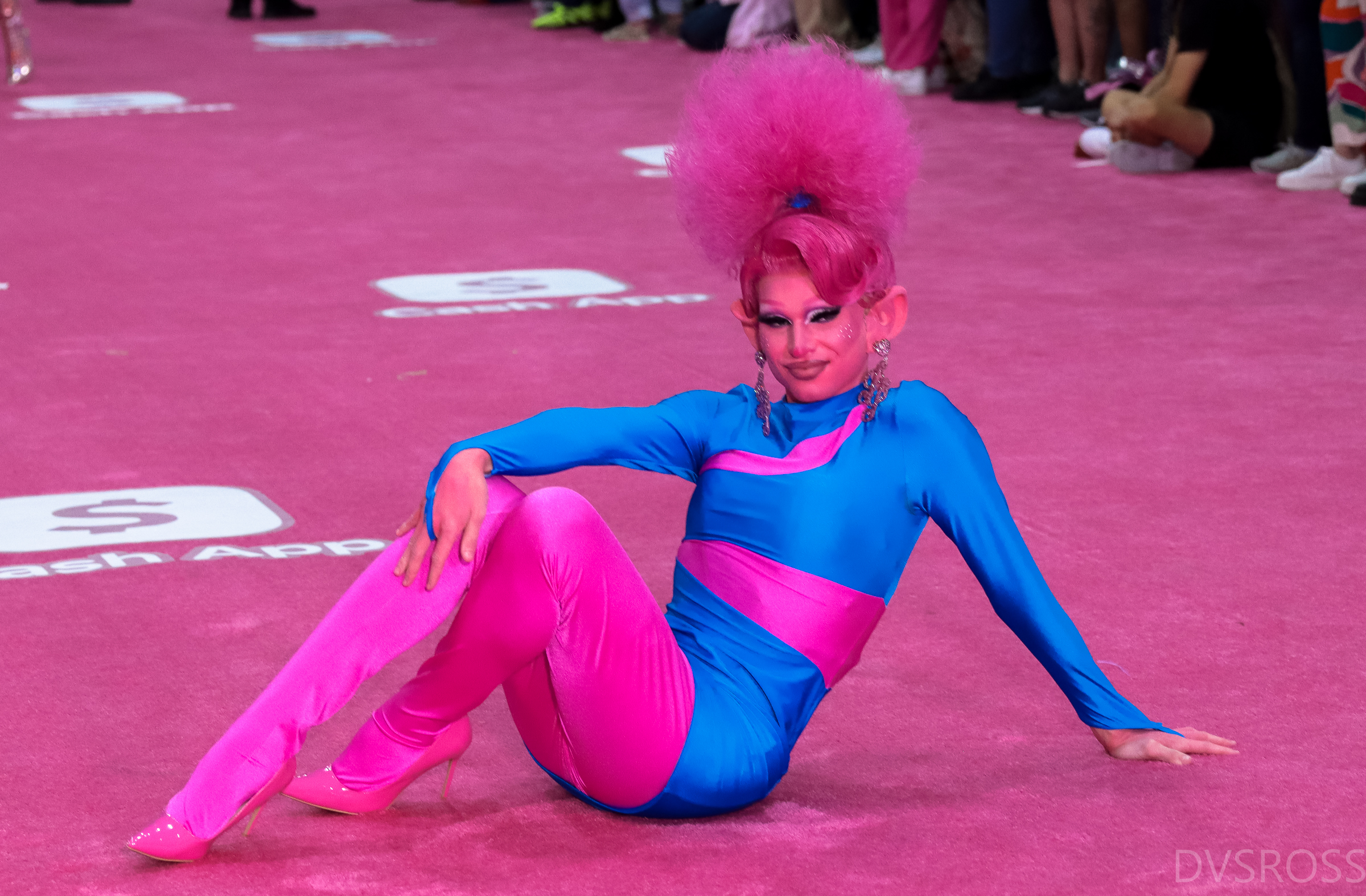
Princess Poppy (pictured at RuPaul's DragCon LA in 2023) is eliminated from the competition.

The contestants return to the Werk Room after Irene Dubois's elimination on the previous episode. Amethyst and Robin Fierce acknowledge their past relationship to the group. On elimination day, RuPaul greets the group and reveals the main challenge, which tasks the contestants with getting into teams and creating infomercials for their vision of the afterlife. As the winner of the previous challenge, Anetra is the first team captain and chooses Luxx Noir London, Sasha Colby, Salina EsTitties, and Marcia Marcia Marcia. Amethyst, as the winner of the previous episode's lip-sync, is the second team captain and chooses Loosey LaDuca, Aura Mayari, Spice, and Princess Poppy. The remaining contestants (Jax, Malaysia Babydoll Foxx, Mistress Isabelle Brooks, Robin Fierce, and Sugar), form the third team.

The teams start to develop their concepts, then film in front of a green screen with Michelle Visage as the director as well as members of the Pit Crew. On elimination day, the contestants make final preparations in the Werk Room for the fashion show. The group discuss religion and its intersection with the LGBTQ community. Malaysia Babydoll Foxx talks about her struggle with being Christian and gay. Mistress Isabelle Brooks relates and describes leaving her family at the age of 17 because of homophobia.

On the main stage, RuPaul welcomes fellow judges Visage and Ts Madison, as well as guest judge Maren Morris. RuPaul shares the assignment of the main challenge and the runway category ("Metallica"), then the contestants present their looks. The group watch the three infomercials. The judge deliver their critiques, deliberate, then share the results with the contestants. Sasha Colby is declared the winner of the main challenge. Amethyst and Princess Poppy place in the bottom and face off in a lip-sync contest to "Ain't No Mountain High Enough" by Diana Ross. Amethyst wins the lip-sync and Princess Poppy is eliminated from the competition.

== Production and broadcast ==
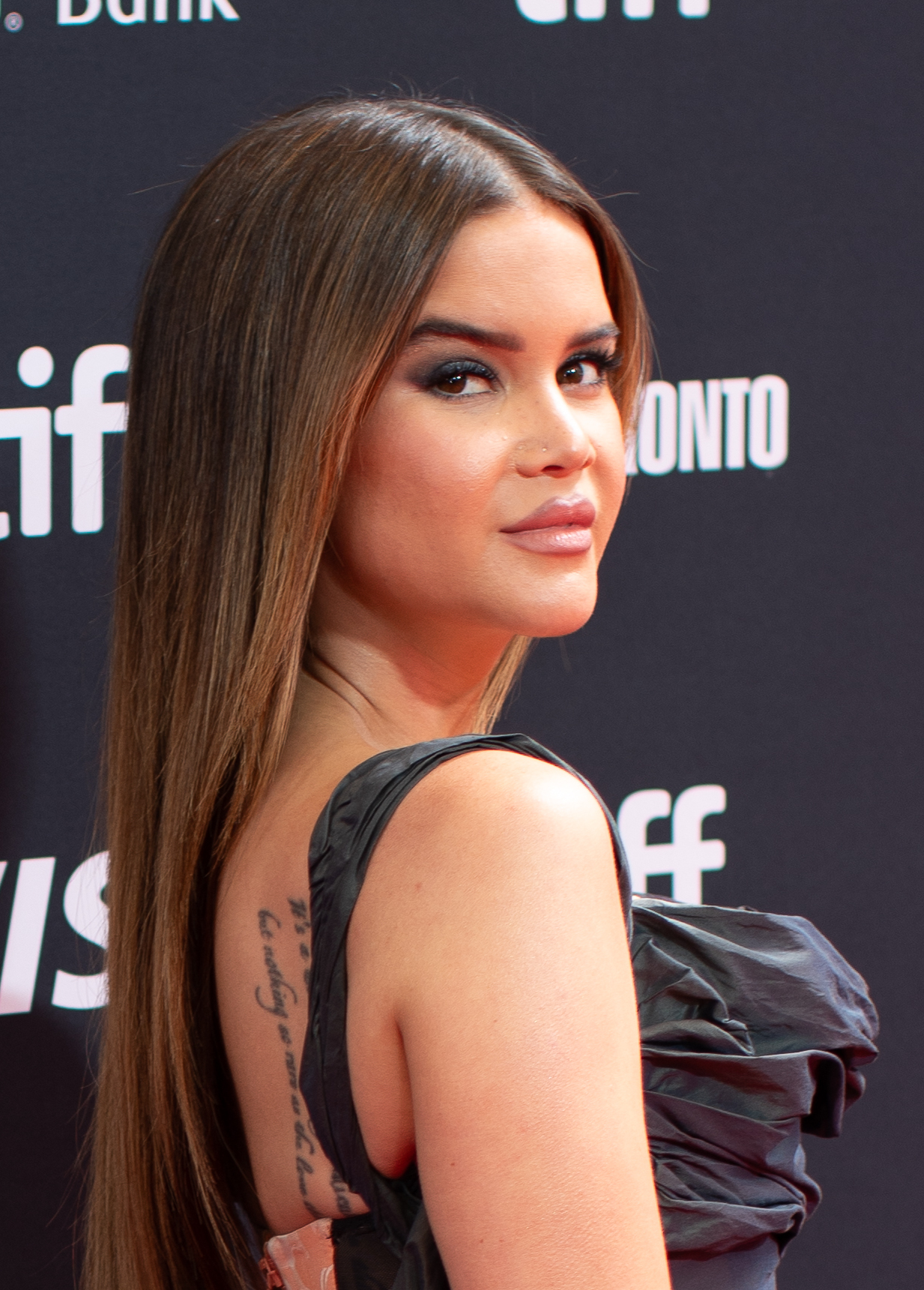
Maren Morris (pictured in 2024) is a guest judge.

The episode originally aired on January 13, 2023. It was accompanied by an episode of the companion series RuPaul's Drag Race: Untucked.

The episode's main challenge has been described as a "scripted comedy acting" assignment. Loosey LaDuca portrays Dolly Parton in her group's infomercial.

=== Fashion ===
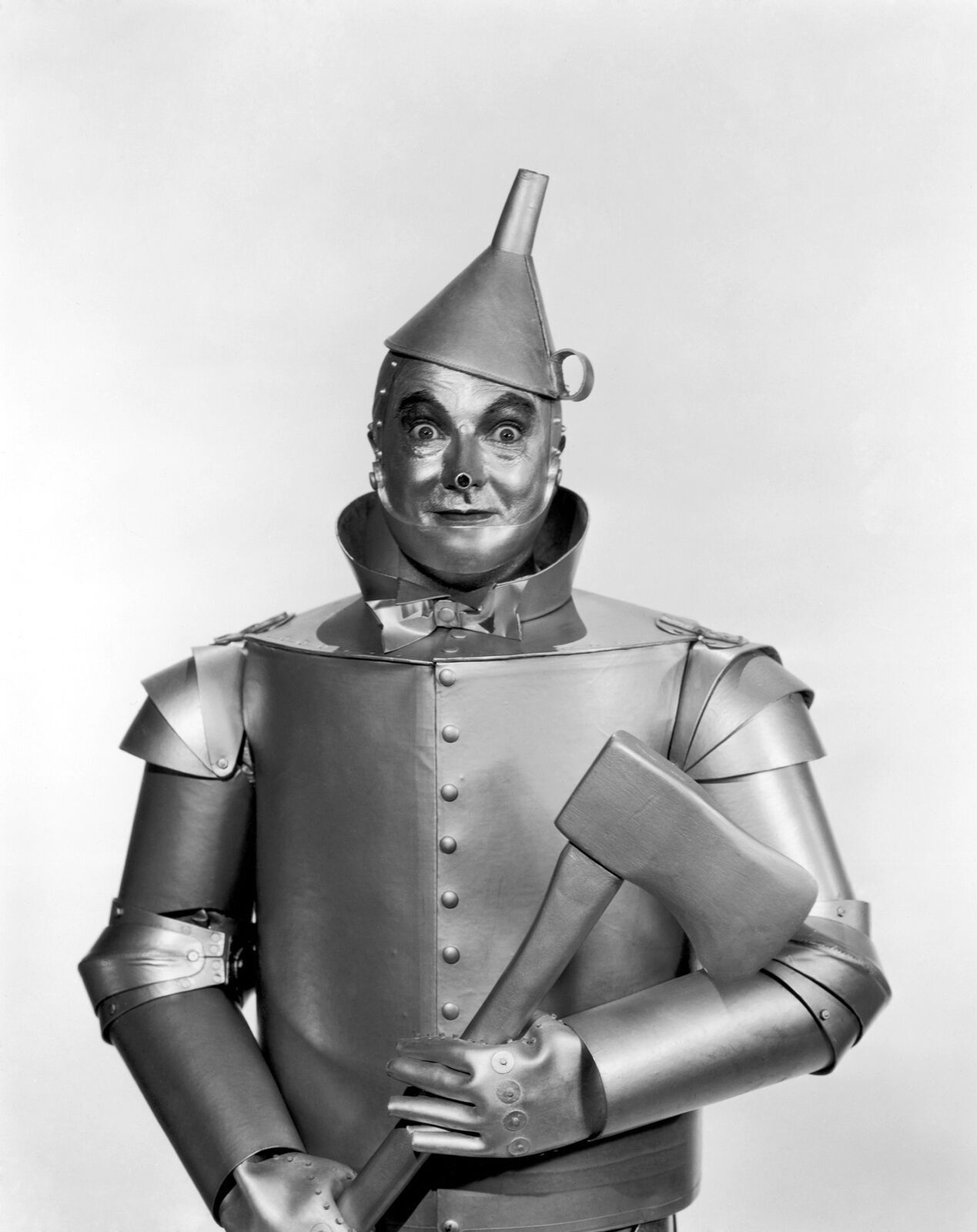
Contestant Marcia Marcia Marcia wears an outfit inspired by the Tin Woodman (pictured is a publicity photo of American entertainer Jack Haley as Tin Man in the 1939 feature film The Wizard of Oz).

For the Werk Room, RuPaul wears a black-and-white suit. For the main stage, RuPaul wears a gold dress, pink nails, and a blonde wig.

For the fashion show, the contestants wear metallic outfits. Anetra has a silver outfit and a short blonde wig. Sasha Colby wears a short silver phoenix-inspired outfit with "feathers". Salina EsTitties has a silver outfit with traffic signs and a lamp from a street light on the top of her head. She also wears a long brown wig. Luxx Noir London has a gold outfit with matching high-heeled shoes and a dark wig. Marcia Marcia Marcia has a Tin Woodman-inspired outfit with a headpiece. Amethyst wears a gold outfit, a matching headpiece, tall boots, and a large blonde wig. Princess Poppy has a short blue-and-silver outfit with blue high-heels and a matching wig. Spice's outfit is blue and silver and she has a long blue wig. She uses a mechanical dog as a prop. Aura Mayari has a moon goddess-inspired green outfit with a headpiece and a long dark wig. Loosey LaDuca wears a futurist gold-and-magenta outfit and a blonde wig. Jax's outfit is inspired by the Mortal Kombat character of the same name. She has silver, camouflage, black boots, hoop earrings, and a dark wig. Robin Fierce wears a gold outfit with matching boots and a dark wig with braids. She carries a spear as a prop. Mistress Isabelle Brooks has a gold outfit, matching high-heels, and a large blonde wig. She carries a large chain. Sugar has a doll-inspired outfit and a blonde wig in the style of ponytails. Malaysia Babydoll Foxx's white outfit has many chains.

== Reception ==
Jason P. Frank of Vulture rated "All Queens Go to Heaven" two out of five stars . Trae DeLellis of The A.V. Club gave the episode a rating of 'B'. Charlie Duncan of PinkNews said Sasha Colby "bulldozed" the main challenge. Stephen Daw ranked the "Ain't No Mountain High Enough" performance number 18 in Billboard's list of the season's lip-syncs. Daw wrote, "Matching the groove of the song with the vibe of her performance, Amethyst delivered a perfectly serviceable, if not somewhat boring, lip-sync to an iconic song. Princess Poppy, on the other hand, decided to show as much of her 'between-me-down-there' (as RuPaul would call it) as possible, making for a very strange and one-sided lip sync." Andy Swift of TVLine said, "Neither queen tore up the main stage this time, but at least Amethyst's energy and performance remained relatively consistent throughout. Poppy went the comedic route, which was to be expected, but you could always feel her trying to be funny, often to the point of madness."

== See also ==
- Christianity and sexual orientation
- History of Christianity and homosexuality
- Religion and LGBTQ people
