= The Crystal Ball (RuPaul's Drag Race) =

- RuPaul's Drag Race episode
- Episode no.: Season 15; Episode 9
- Presented by: RuPaul
- Original air date: February 24, 2023

Guest judge
- Julia Garner

Episode chronology
← Previous "Lip Sync LaLaPaRuza Smackdown"	Next → "50/50's Most Gagworthy Stars"
- RuPaul's Drag Race season 15

"The Crystal Ball" is the ninth episode of the fifteenth season of the American television series RuPaul's Drag Race. It originally aired on February 24, 2023. The episode's main challenge tasks the contestants with presenting three looks in a crystal-themed ball. Julia Garner is a guest judge.

Sasha Colby wins the main challenge. Spice is eliminated from the competition, after placing in the bottom two and losing a lip-sync contest against Salina EsTitties to "Thats What I Want" by Lil Nas X.

== Episode ==
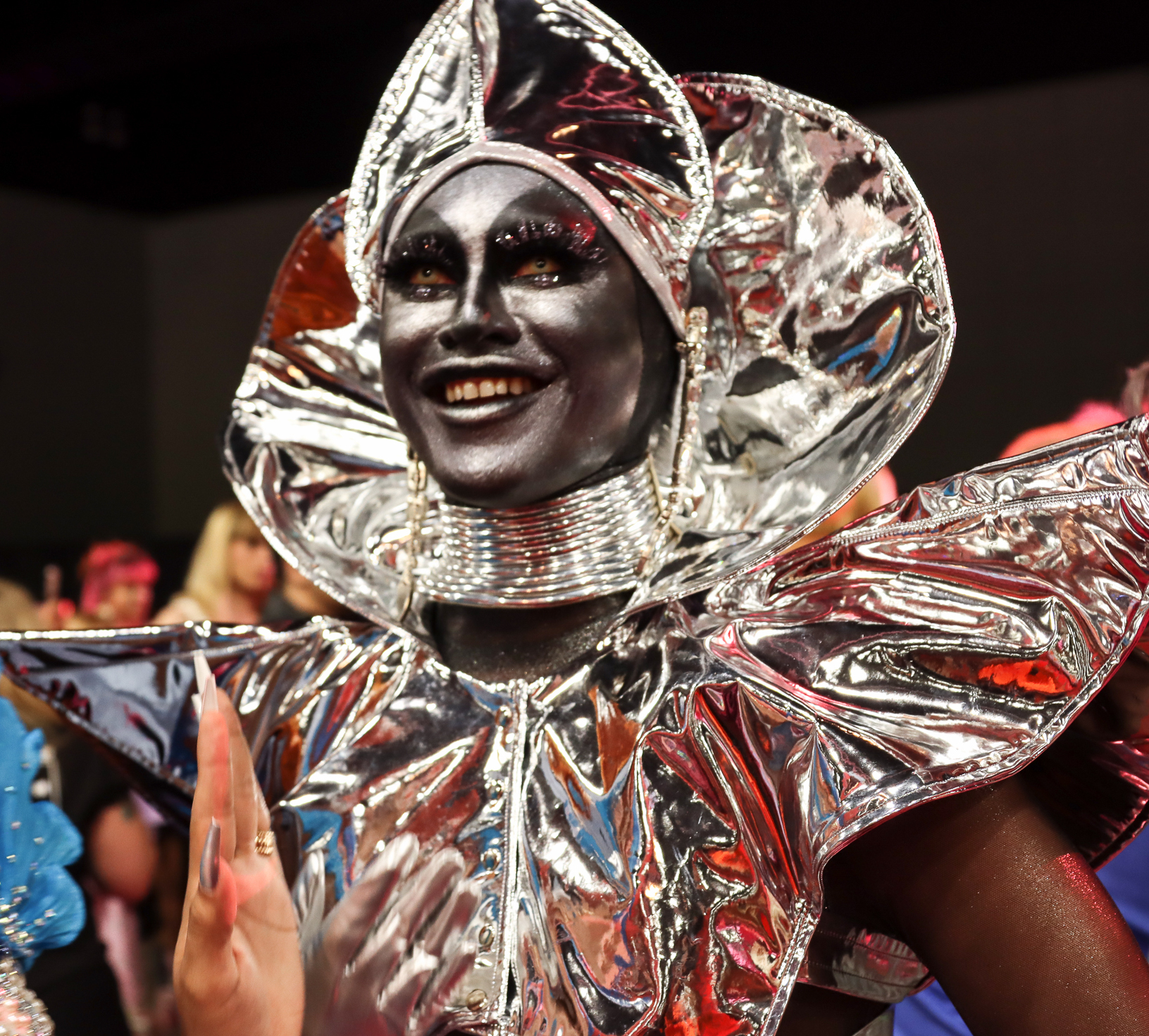
Sasha Colby (pictured at RuPaul's DragCon LA in 2023) wins the main challenge.

The contestants enter then Werk Room, after Jax was eliminated in the previous episode. RuPaul greets the contestants and reveals the mini-challenge: to photobomb classic Drag Race moments in honor of the show's 200th episode. The contestants get into "quick drag".

Following are the contestants and scenarios:

- Salina EsTitties photobombs Laganja Estranja's season 6 entrance
- Anetra photobombs Willow Pill's talent show performance (season 14, episode "Big Opening Number 1")
- Malaysia Babydoll Foxx photobombs Vanessa Vanjie Mateo's main stage exit (season 10, episode "10s Across the Board")
- Spice photobombs Lady Gaga's entrance (season 9, episode "Oh. My. Gaga!")
- Luxx Noir London photobombs Vivacious (with her Ornacia outfit) during the photo shoot challenge on season 6
- Mistress Isabelle Brooks photobombs RuPaul and Morgan McMichaels doing the ping pong ball gimmick
- Marcia Marcia Marcia photobombs the crowning of Jinkx Monssoon on season 5
- Sasha Colby photobombs RuPaul in season 7's "The DESPY Awards"
- Loosey LaDuca photobombs Serena ChaCha during the water tank photo shoot mini-challenge (season 5)

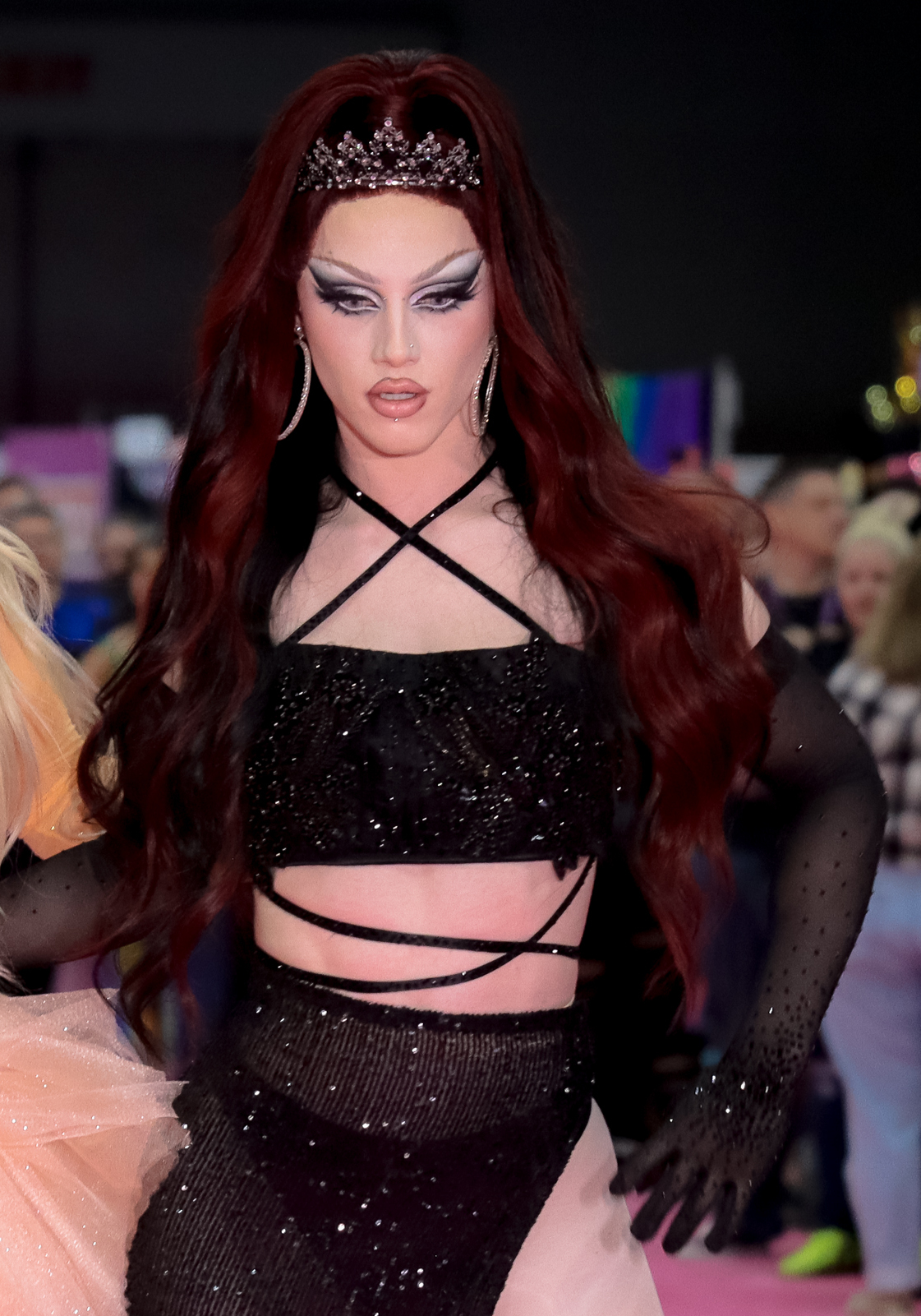
Spice (pictured in 2023) is eliminated from the competition.

Anetra wins the mini-challenge. RuPaul reveals the main challenge, which tasks the contestants with presenting three looks in a crystal-themed ball. Two can be brought from home and one will be made in the Werk Room. The runway categories are: "Start Your Engines", an homage to RuPaul's auto racing look in the show's title sequence; "My Favorite Ball", a reference to a previous ball challenge of each contestants' choosing; and "Crystallized Eleganza", which has contestants create a new look featuring crystals.

The contestants create their crystal outfits in the Werk Room. RuPaul and Carson Kressley visit and get status updates from each contestant. RuPaul reveals that Julia Garner will join as a guest judge. The contestants make their final preparations for the runway. They talk about their families, and Anetra shares her coming out experience. They also talk about iconic moments from the show's history. On the main stage, RuPaul welcomes fellow panelists Michelle Visage, Kressley, and Garner, then performs "Cake and Candy" with backup dancers to celebrate the 200th episode. Anetra, Mistress Isabelle Brooks, and Sasha Colby receive positive critiques, and Sasha Colby wins the challenge. Loosey LaDuca, Salina EsTitties, and Spice receive negative critiques, and Loosey LaDuca is deemed safe. Salina EsTitties and Spice place in the bottom and face off in a lip-sync to "Thats What I Want" (2021) by Lil Nas X. Salina EsTitties is declared the winner, and Spice is eliminated from the competition.

== Production and broadcast ==
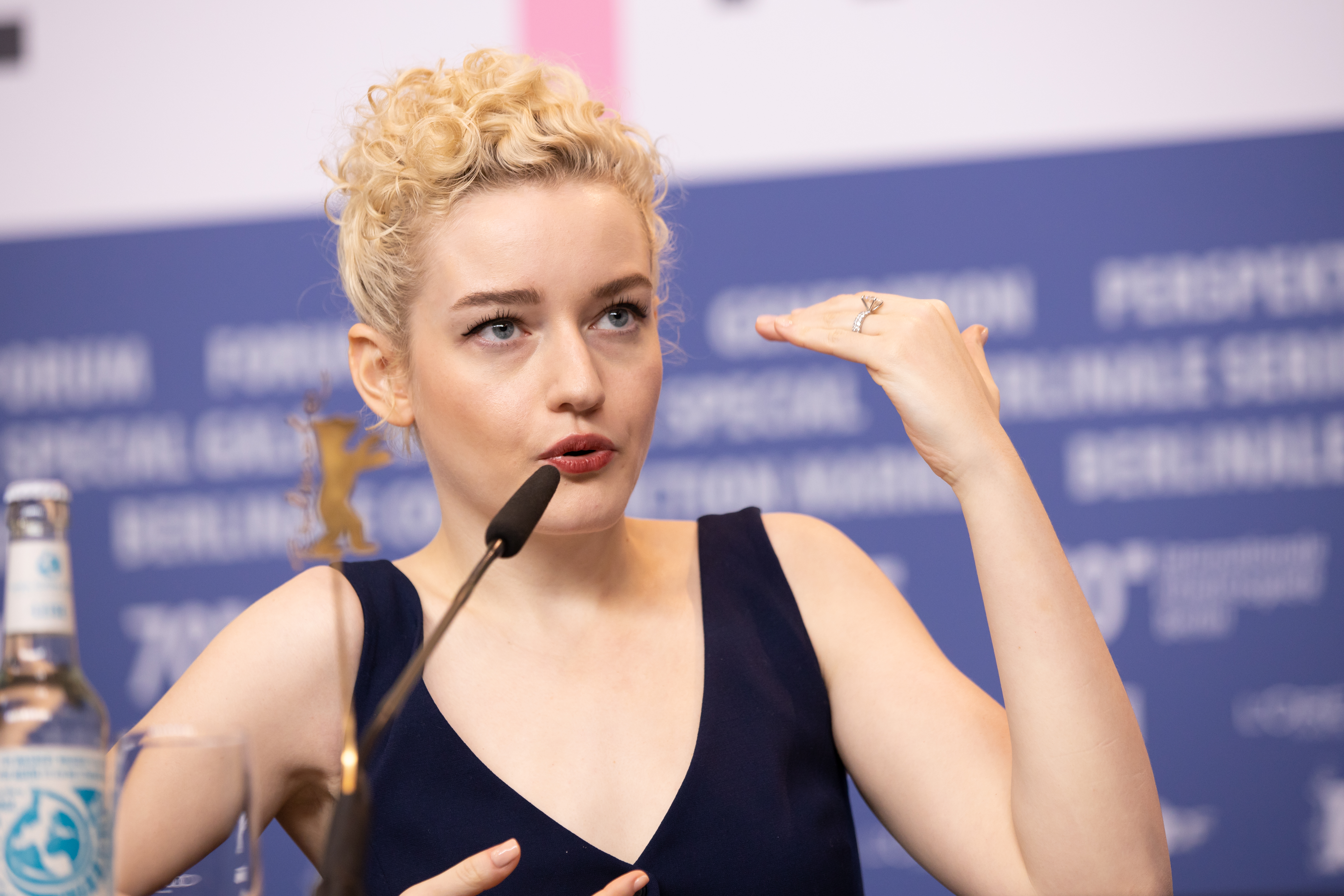
Julia Garner (pictured in 2020) is a guest judge.

The episode originally aired on February 24, 2023.

Sasha Colby reportedly urinated on the main stage during the lip-sync contest. Spice uses a disco ball during the contest.

=== Fashion ===
For "My Favorite Ball", Mistress Isabelle Brooks wears an outfit made from deconstructed beach balls based on "The Ball Ball" (season 12). Marcia Marcia Marcia's outfit is based on "The Bag Ball" (season 13) and Malaysia Babydoll Foxx's dress is based on "The Hair Ball" (season 3). Spice's purple outfit is based on "The Ball Ball" and Salina EsTitties presents an outfit based on "The Money Ball" (season 3). Loosey LaDuca's look is also based on "The Bag Ball" and Luxx Noir London's look is also based on "The Hair Ball". Sasha Colby's cannabis-inspired look is also based on "The Bag Ball" and Anetra's look is based on "Sugar Ball" (season 5). For "Crystallized Eleganza", Spice's look incorporates disco balls. Marcia Marcia Marcia presents a can-can-inspired look. Loosey LaDuca's concept is a small town girl who placed runner-up in a local beauty pageant. Anetra's look has a protruding crystal spine.

== Reception ==
Trae DeLellis of The A.V. Club gave the episode a rating of 'A-'. Stephen Daw ranked the "Thats What I Want" performance number 17 in Billboard's list of the season's lip-syncs and wrote, "The real criminal in this lip sync was the choice of song. Both Salina and Spice did fine given the assignment, but we're stuck wondering why 'That's What I Want' was the song picked out of all Lil Nas X's discography for a Lip Sync For Your Life. 'Call Me By Your Name (Montero),' 'Industry Baby,' and even 'Old Town Road' would have all been much better choices with clearer paths to success for either of these two queens, while 'That's What I Want' offered very little for our performers to act on." Kevin O'Keeffe of Xtra Magazine said Salina EsTitties "delivered an uncharacteristically low-key" lip-sync performance.
