= One Night Only, Part 2 =

- RuPaul's Drag Race episode
- Episode no.: Season 15; Episode 2
- Presented by: RuPaul
- Original air date: January 6, 2023

Guest judges
- Ariana Grande

Episode chronology
← Previous "One Night Only, Part 1"	Next → "All Queens Go to Heaven"
- RuPaul's Drag Race season 15

"One Night Only, Part 2" is the second episode of the fifteenth season of the American television series RuPaul's Drag Race. It originally aired on January 6, 2023. The episode's main challenge tasks the contestants with performing in a talent show called "One Night Only". Ariana Grande is a guest judge. Irene Dubois is eliminated from the competition after placing in the bottom of the main challenge and losing a lip-sync contest against Amethyst to "7 Rings" (2019) by Ariana Grande.

== Episode ==
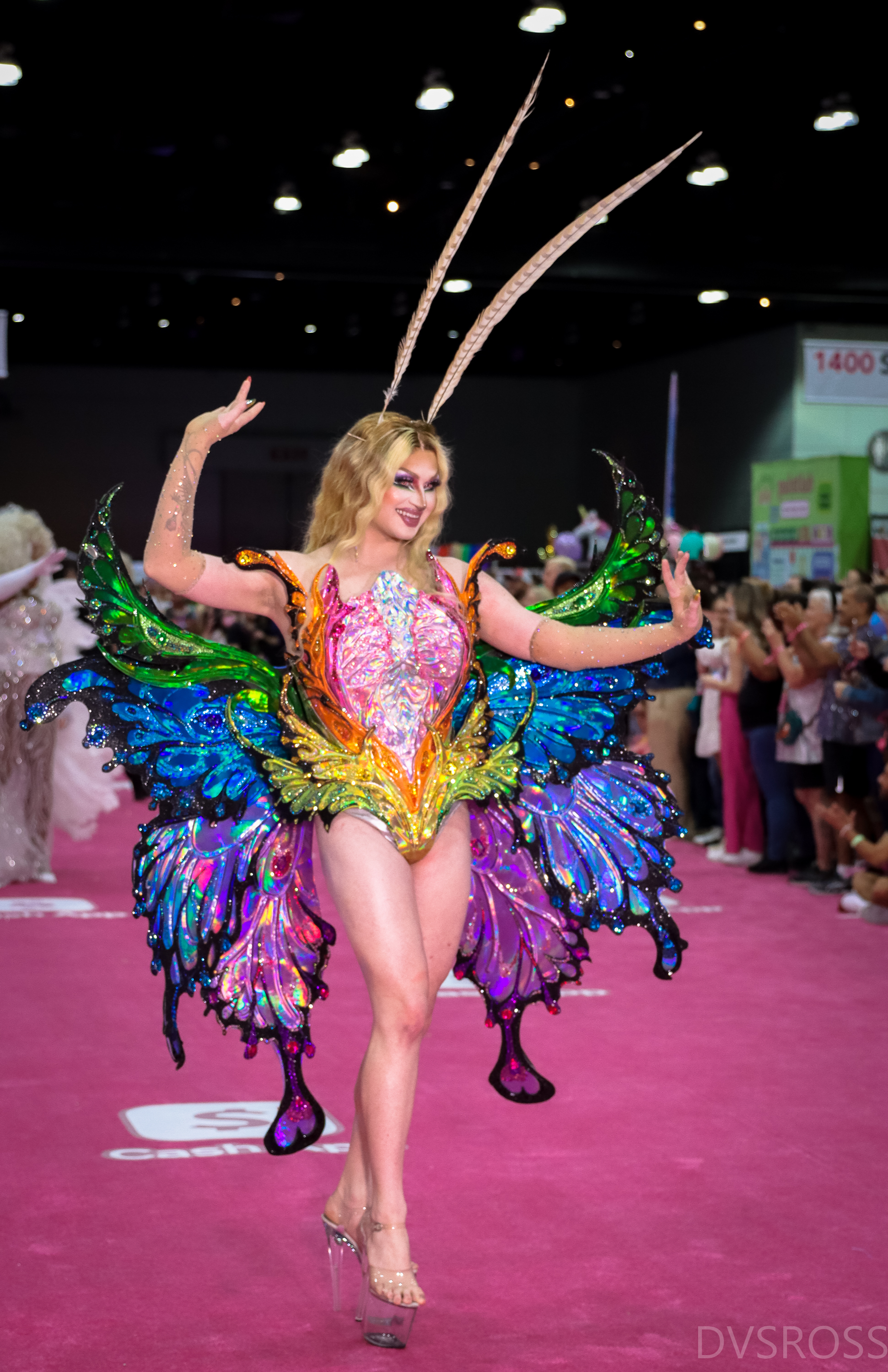
Irene Dubois (pictured at RuPaul's DragCon LA in 2023) is eliminated from the competition.

RuPaul reminds the contestants that someone will be eliminated following the main challenge, which tasks competitors with performing in a talent show and choreography as part of an ensemble entrance number. The contestants get acquainted, then continue to rehearse choreography. On elimination day, the contestants return to the Werk Room and setup their work stations. On the main stage, RuPaul welcomes fellow judges Michelle Visage and Ross Mathews, as well as guest judge Ariana Grande. RuPaul shares the assignment of the main challenge, then the show commences. The contestants perform the opening number, then showcase their talents. Following are the contestants and acts:

- Malaysia Babydoll Foxx – original song lip-sync
- Spice – original song lip sync
- Luxx Noir London – original song lip-sync
- Mistress Isabelle Brooks – original song lip-sync
- Loosey LaDuca – live singing
- Marcia Marcia Marcia – comedy ballet
- Robin Fierce – lip-sync to "Now That We Found Love" (1973)
- Irene Dubois – comedy (making a glass of water)
- Anetra – original song lip-sync and taekwondo
- Sugar – original song lip-sync
- Princess Poppy – original song lip-sync and puppetry
- Salina EsTitties – original song lip-sync
- Amethyst – comedy lip-sync to "All Around the World" (1989)
- Aura Mayari – hip-hop dance routine
- Sasha Colby – lip-sync to "Zombie" (1994)
- Jax – lip-sync and gymnastics

RuPaul reveals the runway category ("Who Is She?"), then the fashion show commences. After the contestants present their looks, the judges deliver their critiques, deliberate, then share the results with the contestants. Anetra is declared the winner of the main challenge. Amethyst and Irene Dubois place in the bottom and face off in a lip-sync contest to "7 Rings" (2019) by Ariana Grande. Amethyst wins the lip-sync and Irene Dubois is eliminated from the competition.

== Production and broadcast ==
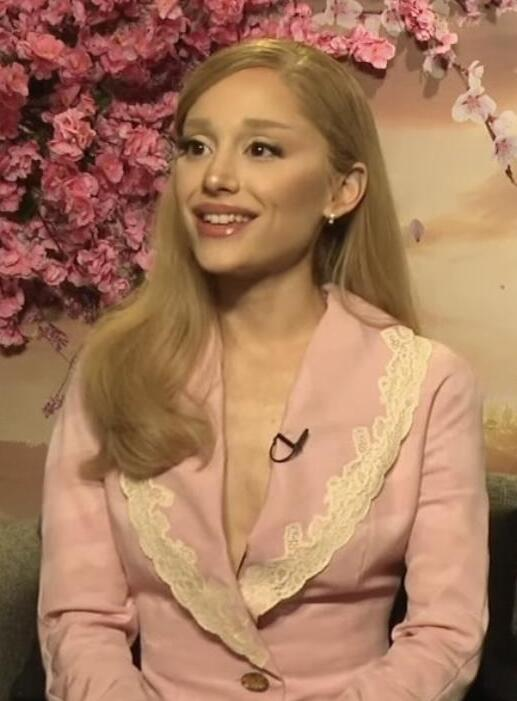
Ariana Grande (pictured in 2024) is a guest judge.

The episode originally aired on January 6, 2023.

Anetra's song has the lyric "you better walk that fucking duck".

=== Fashion ===
For the talent show, Spice wears a short black dress with matching high-heeled shoes and gloves, as well as a long red wig. Luxx Noir London has a bodysuit and a long wig. Mistress Isabelle Brooks wears a red outfit, black footwear, and a large blond wig. Loosey LaDuca has a blue-and-pink outfit with an animal print, as well as a blonde wig with pink streaks. Marcia Marcia Marcia wears a nightgown, braces, and a blonde wig. Robin Fierce has a purple outfit with matching tall boots and a long brown wig. Irene Dubois wears a light green dress and a large blonde wig. Anetra has a gold-and-red outfit with tall red boots and a long dark wig. Sugar has a colorful pastel outfit and a long blonde wig. Princess Poppy wears a short pink dress with a short blonde wig. Salina EsTitties has a light purple outfit, tall black boots, and a short dark wig. Amethyst wears denim jeans, sneakers, a child carrier, a pink scarf, and a blonde wig. She carries a glass of wine in one hand and a cigarette in the other. Aura Mayari has a black outfit, matching boots, and a short pink wig. Sasha Colby wears a black-and-white outfit with a straitjacket, which she removes. She has tall white boots and multiple braids in her hair. Jax wears a short outfit with tall black socks and matching boots. She has long braided hair, which she uses as a skipping rope.

For the fashion show, Irene Dubois wears a black outfit with matching tall boots. Her wig is black and yellow. Luxx Noir London has a blue-and-light purple outfit with purple high-heels and a matching hat. Aura Mayari wears a black outfit with a platinum-colored high-top ponytail. Marcia Marcia Marcia has a Chanel-inspired pastel outfit and a blonde wig. Anetra wears a black-and-metallic outfit with a long wig. Malaysia Babydoll Foxx has a white dress and a dark wig. Princess Poppy wears a colorful toile outfit and a blonde wig. Sasha Colby has a black-and-red outfit with a large headpiece. Salina EsTitties wears a denim outfit with a matching hat and a brown wig. Amethyst has a purple-and-white outfit with a blonde wig in the form of two ponytails. Jax has a colorful outfit with an animal print and braided red hair. Loosey LaDuca wears a Britney Spears-inspired blue-and-white outfit with a large blonde wig. Mistress Isabelle Brooks has a red beaded outfit with a matching cowboy hat and a blonde wig. Robin Fierce has a light blue outfit and a long blonde wig. Sugar wears a Belle-inspired yellow dress with matching high-heels and a long brown wig. She carries a long stem rose. Spice's outfit has a corset. She wears long gloves and a red wig.

== Reception ==
Trae DeLellis of The A.V. Club gave the episode a rating of 'A'. Jason P. Frank of Vulture rated the two-episode premiere four out of five stars.

== See also ==
- Ariana Grande videography
