= Drag Race: The Experience =

Event based on RuPaul's Drag Race

Drag Race: The Experience is an immersive experience based on the American television series RuPaul's Drag Race.

== Description ==
Drag Race: The Experience is based on the American television series RuPaul's Drag Race. The immersive experience features sets from the series, including the Werk Room, the main stage, the judging panel, the Confessional Room, and the Snatch Game stage. It also has interactive challenges, photo opportunities, an "All-Stars Hall of Fame", and unseen footage. The Experience features costumes, a scavenger hunt and merchandise, and guests have access to food and drinks at the Gold Bar.

== History ==
The Experience is produced by World of Wonder. It debuted at Chicago's Exhibition Hub Art Center on November 28, 2025. It was originally slated to run through December 30, but was extended through February 2026. A "preview" night was held on November 20. It included a screening of the premiere of the sixth season of the Canadian spin-off series Canada's Drag Race, with Aura Mayari as a featured guest. The fourteen contestants competing on the eighteenth season of RuPaul's Drag Race visited the exhibit in December 2025, ahead of the season premiere in January 2026.

== Reception ==
Shannon Shreibak of Time Out Chicago said the exhibit opened to "mixed reactions", writing: "Some fans were thrilled to fling themselves into the world of glamazons and queens; others eyed it the way one eyes a suspiciously expensive cocktail—pretty, yes, but why does it cost that much? As for me, a lapsed fan longing to relive the glory days of seasons five and six (the Alyssa-Coco feud! Laganja Estranja’s “let’s get sickening”!!), I landed squarely in the realm of lukewarm." Ciara Myst, who competed on the eighteenth season of RuPaul's Drag Race, said it was "fresh, but also somehow very familiar".
