= RuPaul's Drag Race season 15 =

2023 season of RuPaul's Drag Race

RuPaul's Drag Race
- Season 15
- Promotional poster for season fifteen
- Hosted by: RuPaul
- Judges: RuPaul; Michelle Visage; Carson Kressley; Ross Mathews; Ts Madison
- No. of contestants: 16
- Winner: Sasha Colby
- Runner-up: Anetra
- Miss Congeniality: Malaysia Babydoll Foxx
- Companion show: RuPaul's Drag Race: Untucked!
- No. of episodes: 16

Release
- Original network: MTV
- Original release: January 6 – April 14, 2023

Season chronology
- ← Previous; Season 14 Next → Season 16

The fifteenth season of RuPaul's Drag Race premiered January 6, 2023. The reality competition series moved to MTV for broadcast, instead of VH1 in the United States.

This season features the largest cast in the show's history, with sixteen queens competing for an amount of $200,000, the largest cash prize in the show's history. It is also the first season to feature biological twins, Sugar and Spice. Series judges Michelle Visage, Carson Kressley, and Ross Mathews returned, and Ts Madison, who had previously appeared as a recurring guest judge, joined the judges panel.

The season was won by Sasha Colby, the third trans person to win the main series of RuPaul's Drag Race and first winner of the main series to be openly trans throughout their entire season, with Anetra as the runner-up. Malaysia Babydoll Foxx was named Miss Congeniality.

== Production ==
In November 2021, RuPaul announced a casting call for season fifteen of RuPaul's Drag Race on social media. The casting call was open until January 7, 2022, the day season fourteen premiered. In August 2022, VH1 officially announced the show's renewal, as well for its companion series, RuPaul's Drag Race: Untucked. This season also included the milestone for its 200th episode of the series.

In December 2022, it was announced that season 15 would begin with a special two-part premiere on January 6, 2023, on MTV instead of VH1. Later that month, season 14 winner Willow Pill revealed the season's cast, with a record-breaking sixteen queens competing. The drag racing themed promotional images accompanying the cast announcement drew comparisons to the promotion for the show's debut season.

== Post-production ==
Following the two-part season premiere, subsequent episodes were sixty minutes long, including commercials. This was a reversion to the previous format for seasons one through nine before the show expanded to ninety minutes in season 10. Further, instead of airing Untucked immediately after each main episode, MTV aired the new reality program The Real Friends of WeHo between the main episode and Untucked. The shortened format and programming lineup change elicited backlash from the show's fan base.

On February 9, it was announced that beginning with the March 10 episode, episodes for the remainder of the season would be returning to the ninety-minute format. On August 9, ninety minute edits of the entire season (including the previously truncated episodes 3–10) were released on Paramount+ in the United States and WOW Presents Plus worldwide.

== Contestants ==
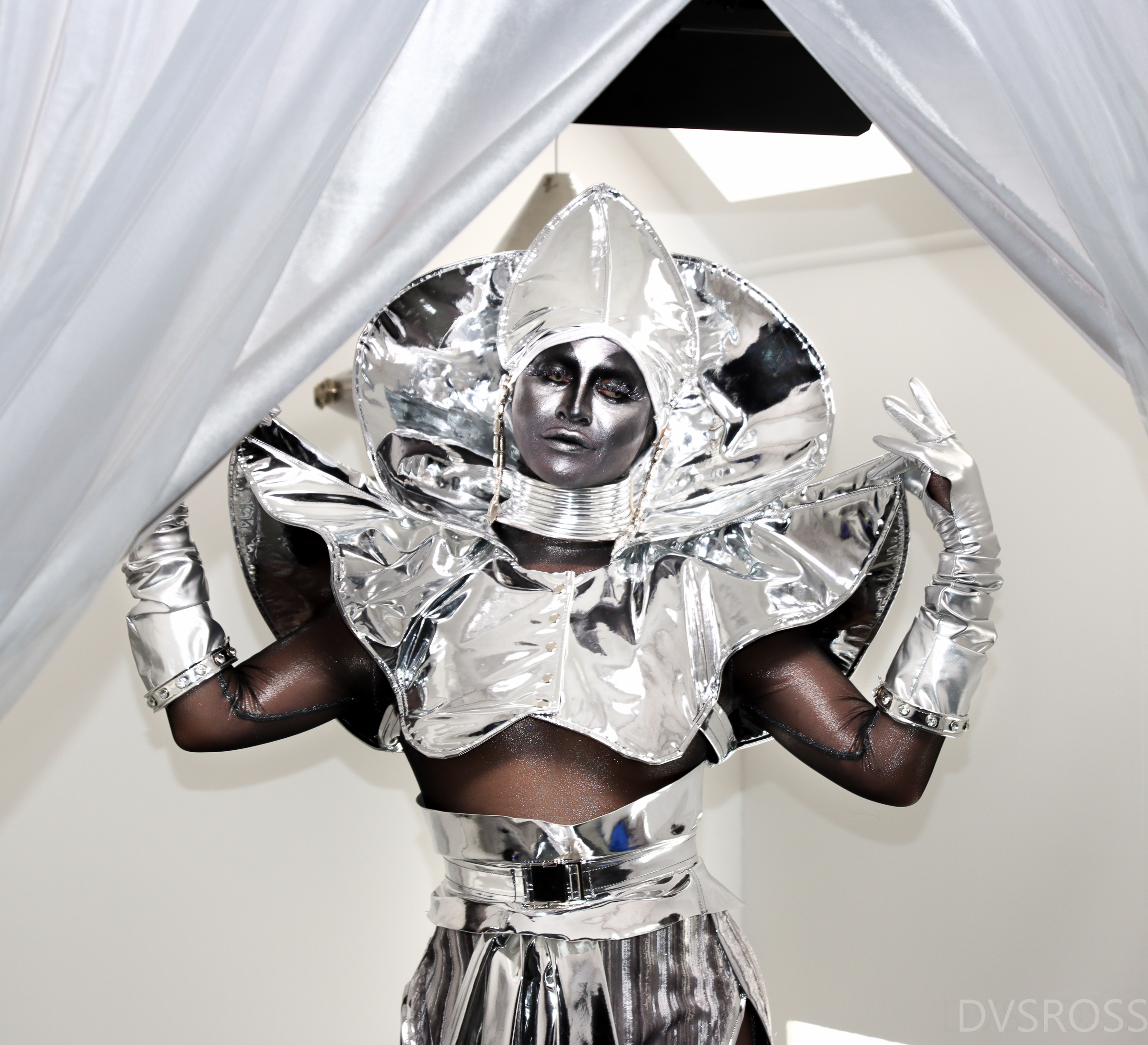
The winner, Sasha Colby

Ages, names, and cities stated are at time of filming.

Contestants of RuPaul's Drag Race season 15 and their backgrounds
Contestant	Age	City	Outcome
Sasha Colby	38	Los Angeles, California	Winner
Anetra	25	Las Vegas, Nevada	Runner-up
Luxx Noir London	22	East Orange, New Jersey	3rd place
Mistress Isabelle Brooks	24	Houston, Texas	3rd place
Loosey LaDuca	32	Ansonia, Connecticut	5th place
Salina EsTitties	31	Los Angeles, California	6th place
Marcia Marcia Marcia	25	New York City, New York	7th place
Malaysia Babydoll Foxx	32	Miami, Florida	8th place (Note: Malaysia Babydoll Foxx was voted Miss Congeniality by fellow contestants.)
Spice (Note: Although they perform as a duo outside of the show, Sugar and Spice competed as individual contestants.)	23	Los Angeles, California	9th place
Jax	25	New York City, New York	10th place
Aura Mayari	30	Nashville, Tennessee	11th place
Robin Fierce	26	Hartford, Connecticut	12th place
Amethyst	27	West Hartford, Connecticut	13th place
Sugar (Note: Sugar Solay is referred to as Sugar on the show.)	23	Los Angeles, California	14th place
Princess Poppy	26	San Francisco, California	15th place
Irene Dubois (Note: Irene the Alien is referred to as Irene Dubois on the show.)	29	Seattle, Washington	16th place

== Contestant progress ==
Legend:

Sasha Colby won RuPaul's Drag Race season 15.
Anetra was the runner-up.
Malaysia Babydoll Foxx was voted Miss Congeniality (Miss C) by fellow contestants.
Salina EsTitties won the Golden Boot (GB) for having the worst look of the season.
WIN indicates that the contestant won the challenge.
SAFE indicates that the contestant was declared safe by the judges.
STAY indicates that the contestant won a LaLaPaRuZa lip sync and remained in the competition.
SAVE indicates that Spice was saved from participating in the final lip sync of the LaLaPaRuZa.
BTM (Bottom) indicates that the contestant was up for elimination.
ELIM (Eliminated) indicates that the contestant was eliminated.
Guest indicates that the contestant returned as a guest.

Progress of contestants including placements in each episode
Contestant	Episode														
Contestant	2	3	4	5	6	7	8	9	10	11	12	13	14	15	16
Sasha Colby	SAFE	WIN	SAFE	SAFE	SAFE	SAFE	STAY	WIN	WIN	SAFE	SAFE	SAFE	WIN	Guest	Winner
Anetra	WIN	SAFE	SAFE	SAFE	SAFE	SAFE	BTM	SAFE	SAFE	BTM	WIN	WIN	BTM	Guest	Runner-up
Luxx Noir London	SAFE	SAFE	SAFE	WIN	SAFE	SAFE	STAY	SAFE	SAFE	WIN	SAFE	BTM	SAFE	Guest	Eliminated
Mistress Isabelle Brooks	SAFE	SAFE	SAFE	SAFE	SAFE	WIN	STAY	SAFE	SAFE	SAFE	SAFE	SAFE	BTM	Guest	Eliminated
Loosey LaDuca	SAFE	SAFE	WIN	SAFE	SAFE	SAFE	STAY	SAFE	SAFE	WIN	BTM	ELIM		Guest	Guest
Salina EsTitties	SAFE	SAFE	SAFE	BTM	SAFE	SAFE	STAY	BTM	BTM	SAFE	ELIM			GB	Guest
Marcia Marcia Marcia	SAFE	SAFE	SAFE	SAFE	SAFE	SAFE	STAY	SAFE	SAFE	ELIM				Guest	Guest
Malaysia Babydoll Foxx	SAFE	SAFE	SAFE	SAFE	SAFE	SAFE	STAY	SAFE	ELIM					Guest	Miss C
Spice	SAFE	SAFE	BTM	SAFE	SAFE	SAFE	SAVE	ELIM						Guest	Guest
Jax	SAFE	SAFE	SAFE	SAFE	BTM	BTM	ELIM							Guest	Guest
Aura Mayari	SAFE	SAFE	SAFE	SAFE	WIN	ELIM								Guest	Guest
Robin Fierce	SAFE	SAFE	SAFE	SAFE	ELIM									Guest	Guest
Amethyst	BTM	BTM	SAFE	ELIM										Guest	Guest
Sugar	SAFE	SAFE	ELIM											Guest	Guest
Princess Poppy	SAFE	ELIM												Guest	Guest
Irene Dubois	ELIM													Guest	Guest

== Lip syncs ==
Legend:

The contestant was eliminated after their first time in the bottom.
The contestant was eliminated after their second time in the bottom.
The contestant was eliminated after their third time in the bottom.
The contestant was eliminated after their fourth time in the bottom.
The contestant won the first round of the Lip Sync LaLaPaRuZa Smackdown and remained in the competition.
The contestant won the second round of the Lip Sync LaLaPaRuZa Smackdown and remained in the competition.
The contestant won the Lip Sync for the Crown and was declared the winner of the season.

Episode	Contestants			Song	Eliminated
2	Amethyst	vs.	Irene Dubois	"7 Rings" (Ariana Grande)	Irene Dubois
3	Amethyst	vs.	Princess Poppy	"Ain't No Mountain High Enough (Eric Kupper Remix)" (Diana Ross)	Princess Poppy
4	Spice	vs.	Sugar	"You Better Run" (Pat Benatar)	Sugar
5	Amethyst	vs.	Salina EsTitties	"Q.U.E.E.N." (Janelle Monáe ft. Erykah Badu)	Amethyst
6	Jax	vs.	Robin Fierce	"In Your Room" (The Bangles)	Robin Fierce
7	Aura Mayari	vs.	Jax	"Sweetest Pie" (Megan Thee Stallion, Dua Lipa)	Aura Mayari
Episode	Contestants			Song	Winner
8	Malaysia Babydoll Foxx	vs.	Marcia Marcia Marcia	"Boys Don't Cry" (Anitta)	Marcia Marcia Marcia
8	Loosey LaDuca	vs.	Spice	"Do You Wanna Touch Me (Oh Yeah)" (Joan Jett and the Blackhearts)	Loosey LaDuca
8	Luxx Noir London	vs.	Salina EsTitties	"It's All Coming Back to Me Now" (Céline Dion)	Salina EsTitties
8	Jax	vs.	Mistress Isabelle Brooks	"Tell It to My Heart" (Taylor Dayne)	Mistress Isabelle Brooks
8	Anetra	vs.	Sasha Colby	"I'm in Love with a Monster" (Fifth Harmony)	Sasha Colby
8	Malaysia Babydoll Foxx	vs.	Spice	"Don't Go Yet" (Camila Cabello)	Malaysia Babydoll Foxx
8	Anetra vs. Jax vs. Luxx Noir London			"The Right Stuff" (Vanessa Williams)	Luxx Noir London
8	Contestants			Song	Eliminated
8	Anetra	vs.	Jax	"Finally" (CeCe Peniston)	Jax
9	Salina EsTitties	vs.	Spice	"Thats What I Want" (Lil Nas X)	Spice
10	Malaysia Babydoll Foxx	vs.	Salina EsTitties	"Single Ladies (Put a Ring on It)" (Beyoncé)	Malaysia Babydoll Foxx
11	Anetra	vs.	Marcia Marcia Marcia	"Boss Bitch" (Doja Cat)	Marcia Marcia Marcia
12	Loosey LaDuca	vs.	Salina EsTitties	"Running Up That Hill (A Deal with God)" (Kate Bush)	Salina EsTitties
13	Loosey LaDuca	vs.	Luxx Noir London	"For the Girls" (Hayley Kiyoko)	Loosey LaDuca
14	Anetra	vs.	Mistress Isabelle Brooks	"When Love Takes Over" (David Guetta ft. Kelly Rowland)	None
Episode	Final contestants			Song	Winner
16	Anetra	vs.	Sasha Colby	"Knock on Wood" (Amii Stewart)	Sasha Colby

== Guest judges ==
- Ariana Grande, singer and actress
- Maren Morris, singer-songwriter
- Amandla Stenberg, actress
- Janelle Monáe, singer, rapper, and actress
- Megan Stalter, comedian
- Harvey Guillén, actor
- Julia Garner, actress
- Ali Wong, stand-up comedian and actress
- Orville Peck, South African country musician based in Canada
- Hayley Kiyoko, singer, dancer, and actress

=== Special guests ===
Guests who appeared in episodes, but did not judge on the main stage.

Episode 1

- Albert Sanchez, photographer
- Vivacious, contestant on season 6

Episode 6

- Freddy Scott, composer and actor
- Leland, producer
- Old Gays, social media personalities and activists

Episode 7

- Danny Trejo, actor

Episode 10

- Charo, singer, actress, musician and comedian
- Frankie Grande, Internet personality
- Love Connie, drag performer

Episode 12

- Miguel Zarate, choreographer

Episode 13

- Norvina, president of Anastasia Beverly Hills

Episode 14

- Miguel Zarate, choreographer

Episode 15

- Kevin Bacon, actor
- Susan Bysiewicz, lieutenant governor of Connecticut
- Aquaria, winner of season 10
- Asia O'Hara, contestant on season 10
- Coco Montrese, contestant on season 5 and All Stars season 2
- DeJa Skye, contestant on season 14
- Derrick Barry, contestant on season 8 and All Stars season 5
- Maddy Morphosis, contestant on season 14 and Golden Boot Award winner

Episode 16

- Bob Mackie, fashion designer
- Leland, producer
- Orville Peck, South African country musician
- Vanessa Williams, singer, actress, and former Miss America
- Jinkx Monsoon, winner of season 5 and All Stars season 7
- Kornbread "The Snack" Jeté, contestant on and Miss Congeniality of season 14
- Willow Pill, winner of season 14

== Episodes ==
No. overall	No. in series	Title	Original release date
192	1	"One Night Only, Part 1"	January 6, 2023
The first eight queens enter the workroom. For their first mini-challenge, the queens do a sexy car wash photoshoot. Irene Dubois wins the mini-challenge. The second eight queens then enter the workroom. For their first mini-challenge, the queens do a windy hog photoshoot. Loosey LaDuca wins the mini-challenge. At the end of the episode, the two groups meet.: Special Guests: Ariana Grande and Vivacious; Group 1 Mini-Challenge: Sexy Car Wash Photoshoot; Group 1 Mini-Challenge Winner: Irene Dubois; Group 1 Mini-Challenge Prize: A $2,500 cash tip; Group 2 Mini-Challenge: Windy Hog Photoshoot; Group 2 Mini-Challenge Winner: Loosey LaDuca; Group 2 Mini-Challenge Prize: A $2,500 cash tip
193	2	"One Night Only, Part 2"	January 6, 2023
For this week's main challenge, the queens perform a talent in front of the judges.: Amethyst – Comedy lip-sync; Anetra – Original song lip-sync and taekwondo; Aura Mayari – Hip-hop dance routine; Irene Dubois – Stand-Up comedy; Jax – Lipsync and Gymnastics; Loosey LaDuca – Live singing; Luxx Noir London – Original song lip-sync; Malaysia Babydoll Foxx – Original song lip-sync; Marcia Marcia Marcia – Comedy Ballet; Mistress Isabelle Brooks – Original song lip-sync; Princess Poppy – Original song lip-sync and puppetry; Robin Fierce – Lip-sync; Salina EsTitties – Original song lip-sync; Sasha Colby – Lip-sync; Spice – Original song lip-sync; Sugar – Original song lip-sync; On the runway, category is Who Is She? Anetra, Jax and Marcia Marcia Marcia receive positive critiques, with Anetra winning the challenge. Amethyst, Irene Dubois and Loosey LaDuca receive negative critiques, with Loosey LaDuca being safe. Amethyst and Irene Dubois lip-sync to "7 Rings" by Ariana Grande. Amethyst wins the lip-sync and Irene Dubois is the first queen to sashay away.: Guest Judge: Ariana Grande; Alternating Judge: Ross Mathews; Main Challenge: Perform a talent in front of the judges; Runway Theme: Who Is She?; Challenge Winner: Anetra; Challenge Prize: A $5,000 cash tip; Bottom Two: Amethyst and Irene Dubois; Lip-Sync Song: "7 Rings" by Ariana Grande; Eliminated: Irene Dubois; Farewell Message: "I Left a Poop in one of Your stations... But WHOMSTS??? 👽 Irene"
194	3	"All Queens Go to Heaven"	January 13, 2023
For this week's main challenge, the queens team up to write an infomercial for a queer afterlife.: Team 1 - Anetra, Luxx Noir London, Salina EsTitties, Sasha Colby and Marcia Marcia Marcia; Team 2 - Amethyst, Aura Mayari, Loosey LaDuca, Princess Poppy and Spice; Team 3 - Jax, Malaysia Babydoll Foxx, Mistress Isabelle Brooks, Robin Fierce and Sugar; On the runway, category is Metallica. Loosey LaDuca, Luxx Noir London and Sasha Colby receive positive critiques, with Sasha Colby winning the challenge. Amethyst, Jax and Princess Poppy receive negative critiques, with Jax being safe. Amethyst and Princess Poppy lip-sync to "Ain't No Mountain High Enough" by Diana Ross. Amethyst wins the lip-sync and Princess Poppy sashays away.: Guest Judge: Maren Morris; Alternating Judge: Ts Madison; Main Challenge: In teams, write an infomercial for a queer afterlife; Runway Theme: Metallica; Challenge Winner: Sasha Colby; Challenge Prize: A $5,000 cash tip; Bottom Two: Amethyst and Princess Poppy; Lip-Sync Song: "Ain't No Mountain High Enough" by Diana Ross; Eliminated: Princess Poppy; Farewell Message: "[Scribbles]"
195	4	"Supersized Snatch Game"	January 20, 2023
For this week's main challenge, the queens play the Snatch Game in two separate groups. Bruno Alcantara and Calixto Quan star as the celebrity contestants in the first group. Asaf Goren and Bryce Eilenberg star as the celebrity contestants in the second group. The cast consisted of: Group 1: Anetra as Gorgena Ramsay; Luxx Noir London as Amanda Lepore; Malaysia Babydoll Foxx as Saucy Santana; Mistress Isabelle Brooks as Rosie O'Donnell; Marcia Marcia Marcia as Tim Gunn; Robin Fierce as Karen Huger; Salina EsTitties as the Virgin Mary; Group 2: Amethyst as Patricia "Tan Mom" Krentcil; Aura Mayari as Bretman Rock; Jax as Mona Lisa; Loosey LaDuca as Joan Rivers; Sasha Colby as Jan Crouch; Sugar as Trisha Paytas; Spice as Miley Cyrus; On the runway, category is Beautiful Nightmare. Loosey LaDuca, Marcia Marcia Marcia, and Mistress Isabelle Brooks receive positive critiques, with Loosey LaDuca winning the challenge. Aura Mayari, Spice and Sugar receive negative critiques, with Aura Mayari being safe. Spice and Sugar lip-sync to "You Better Run" by Pat Benatar. Spice wins the lip-sync and Sugar sashays away.: Guest Judge: Amandla Stenberg; Alternating Judge: Carson Kressley; Main Challenge: Snatch Game; Runway Theme: Beautiful Nightmare; Challenge Winner: Loosey LaDuca; Challenge Prize: A $5,000 cash tip; Bottom Two: Spice and Sugar; Lip-Sync Song: "You Better Run" by Pat Benatar; Eliminated: Sugar; Farewell Message: "To Spice, take the crown home you ugly bitch! To my new sisters, I feel your hearts, take care of Spice! Your [sic] all sweeter than Sugar will ever be <3"
196	5	"House of Fashion"	January 27, 2023
For this week's mini-challenge, the queens read each other to filth. Loosey LaDuca wins the mini-challenge. For the main challenge, the queens team up to create a cohesive fashion line made out of home decor.: House of Carson Kressley - Anetra, Jax, Robin Fierce and Salina EsTitties; House of Michelle Visage - Amethyst, Aura Mayari, Luxx Noir London, Mistress Isabelle Brooks and Spice; House of Ross Mathews - Loosey LaDuca, Malaysia Babydoll Foxx, Marcia Marcia Marcia and Sasha Colby; On the runway, category is Drag Race Fashion Week. Luxx Noir London, Malaysia Babydoll Foxx, Robin Fierce and Sasha Colby receive positive critiques, with Luxx Noir London winning the challenge. Amethyst, Jax and Salina EsTitties receive negative critiques, with Jax being safe. Amethyst and Salina EsTitties lip-sync to "Q.U.E.E.N." by Janelle Monáe ft. Erykah Badu. Salina EsTitties wins the lip-sync and Amethyst sashays away.: Guest Judge: Janelle Monáe; Alternating Judge: Ross Mathews; Mini-Challenge: Reading is Fundamental; Mini-Challenge Winner: Loosey LaDuca; Mini-Challenge Prize: A $2,500 cash tip; Main Challenge: In teams, create a cohesive fashion line made out of home decor; Runway Theme: Drag Race Fashion Week; Challenge Winner: Luxx Noir London; Main Challenge Prize: A $5,000 cash tip; Bottom Two: Amethyst and Salina EsTitties; Lip-Sync Song: "Q.U.E.E.N." by Janelle Monáe ft. Erykah Badu; Eliminated: Amethyst; Farewell Message: "Don't forget about your favorite gem ♡ -Amethyst love you all"
197	6	"Old Friends Gold"	February 3, 2023
For this week's main challenge, the queens write, record, and perform verses as old lady girl groups.: Team Banjo Bitches - Luxx Noir London, Marcia Marcia Marcia, Mistress Isabelle Brooks and Salina EsTitties; Team Ol' Dirty Bitches - Anetra, Jax, Loosey LaDuca and Robin Fierce; Team Rockin' Old G's - Aura Mayari, Malaysia Babydoll Foxx, Sasha Colby and Spice; On the runway, category is Tie-Dye to Die For. Aura Mayari, Mistress Isabelle Brooks and Sasha Colby receive positive critiques, with Aura Mayari winning the challenge. Anetra, Jax and Robin Fierce receive negative critiques, with Anetra being safe. Jax and Robin Fierce lip-sync to "In Your Room" by The Bangles. Jax wins the lip-sync and Robin Fierce sashays away.: Guest Judge: Megan Stalter; Alternating Judge: Ross Mathews; Main Challenge: Write, record, and perform verses as old lady girl groups; Runway Theme: Tie-Dye to Die For; Challenge Winner: Aura Mayari; Main Challenge Prize: A $5,000 cash tip; Bottom Two: Jax and Robin Fierce; Lip-Sync Song: "In Your Room" by The Bangles; Eliminated: Robin Fierce; Farewell Message: "Forever a Queen! Forever Fierce! Loosey Slay these Hoes Jax I'm blocking you! LOL JK Love y'all, Robin Fine LMAO"
198	7	"The Daytona Wind 2"	February 10, 2023
For this week's main challenge, the queens act in an 80's soap opera reboot called "The Daytona Wind".: Anetra as Cousin Georgie; Aura Mayari as Widow Davenport; Jax as Jackson Davenport; Loosey LaDuca as Lizzadene; Luxx Noir London as Leo Michaels; Malaysia Babydoll Foxx as The Reverend; Marcia Marcia Marcia as Cousin Dodie; Mistress Isabelle Brooks as Fancy Michaels; Salina EsTitties as "Aint" Haddie Ruth; Sasha Colby as Maxie O'Hara; Spice as Diandra Davenport; On the runway, category is Puffa Please. Anetra, Malaysia Babydoll Foxx, Marcia Marcia Marcia and Mistress Isabelle Brooks receive positive critiques, with Mistress Isabelle Brooks winning the challenge. Aura Mayari, Jax and Spice receive negative critiques, with Spice being safe. Aura Mayari and Jax lip-sync to "Sweetest Pie" by Megan Thee Stallion and Dua Lipa. Jax wins the lip-sync and Aura Mayari sashays away.: Guest Judge: Harvey Guillén; Alternating Judge: Carson Kressley; Main Challenge: Act in an 80's soap opera reboot called "The Daytona Wind"; Runway Theme: Puffa Please; Challenge Winner: Mistress Isabelle Brooks; Main Challenge Prize: A $5,000 cash tip; Bottom Two: Aura Mayari and Jax; Lip-Sync Song: "Sweetest Pie" by Megan Thee Stallion and Dua Lipa; Eliminated: Aura Mayari; Farewell Message: "I love you all so much! Can't wait to kai-kai after this! ❤️ trade of the season, Aura Mayari 🌙"
199	8	"Lip Sync LaLaPaRuza Smackdown"	February 17, 2023
For this week's main challenge, the queens participate in a Lip-Sync LaLaPaRuZa Smackdown to determine who will be eliminated. A pit crew member randomly picks a ball with a queen's initials, determining who will lip-sync first. The selected queen then chooses their lip-sync opponent, who in turn chooses the lip-sync song. The tournament continues in successive rounds, with losing queens competing in multiple rounds, until one last lip-sync determines who will be eliminated. In the first round, Malaysia Babydoll Foxx gets picked first and chooses Marcia Marcia Marcia to lip-sync against. Marcia Marcia Marcia then chooses "Boys Don't Cry" by Anitta. Marcia Marcia Marcia wins the lip-sync and Malaysia Babydoll Foxx loses. Loosey LaDuca is next to be picked and chooses Spice to lip-sync against. Spice then chooses "Do You Wanna Touch Me" by Joan Jett. Loosey LaDuca wins the lip-sync and Spice loses. Luxx Noir London is next to be picked and chooses Salina EsTitties to lip-sync against. Salina EsTitties then chooses "It's All Coming Back to Me Now" by Céline Dion. Salina EsTitties wins the lip-sync and Luxx Noir London loses. Mistress Isabelle Brooks is next to be picked and chooses Jax to lip-sync against. Jax then chooses "Tell It to My Heart" by Taylor Dayne. Mistress Isabelle Brooks wins the lip-sync and Jax loses. The final two queens, Anetra and Sasha Colby, lip-sync to "I'm in Love with a Monster" by Fifth Harmony. Sasha Colby wins the lip-sync and Anetra loses. In the second round, Malaysia Babydoll Foxx gets picked first and chooses Spice to lip-sync against. Spice then chooses "Don't Go Yet" by Camila Cabello. Malaysia Babydoll Foxx wins the lip-sync and Spice loses. The final three queens, Anetra, Jax and Luxx Noir London, lip-sync to "The Right Stuff" by Vanessa Williams. Luxx Noir London wins the lip-sync and Anetra and Jax both lose. In the final round, RuPaul announces that only two queens will be lip-syncing. One queen will be selected at random, and that queen must choose one of the other two queens to save. Anetra is picked and chooses to save Spice. Anetra and Jax then lip-sync to "Finally" by CeCe Peniston. Anetra wins the lip-sync and Jax sashays away.: Alternating Judge: Ross Mathews; Main Challenge: Participate in a Lip Sync LaLaPaRuZa Smackdown; Lip-Sync Songs: "Boys Don't Cry" by Anitta, "Do You Wanna Touch Me" by Joan Jett, "It's All Coming Back to Me Now" by Celine Dion, "Tell It to My Heart" by Taylor Dayne, "I'm in Love with a Monster" by Fifth Harmony, "Don't Go Yet" by Camila Cabello, "The Right Stuff" by Vanessa Williams and "Finally" by CeCe Peniston; Lip-Sync Winners: Marcia Marcia Marcia, Loosey LaDuca, Salina EsTitties, Mistress Isabelle Brooks, Sasha Colby, Malaysia Babydoll Foxx, Luxx Noir London and Anetra; Bottom Two: Anetra and Jax; Eliminated: Jax; Farewell Message: "To my forever sisters! I Love you all and can not wait to see you on the road. TOP TEN FOREVER XOXO JAX - P.S Anetra I'll get you back"
200	9	"The Crystal Ball"	February 24, 2023
For this week's mini-challenge, the queens photobomb classic Drag Race moments. Anetra wins the mini-challenge. For the main challenge, the queens create three looks for The Crystal Ball: Start Your Engines, My Favorite Ball and Crystallized Eleganza.: Anetra - The Sugar Ball from Season 5; Loosey LaDuca - The Bag Ball from Season 13; Luxx Noir London - The Hair Ball from Season 3; Malaysia Babydoll Foxx - The Hair Ball from Season 3; Marcia Marcia Marcia - The Bag Ball from Season 13; Mistress Isabelle Brooks - The Ball Ball from Season 12; Salina EsTitties - The Money Ball from Season 3; Sasha Colby - The Bag Ball from Season 13; Spice - The Ball Ball from Season 12; On the runway, Anetra, Mistress Isabelle Brooks and Sasha Colby receive positive critiques, with Sasha Colby winning the challenge. Loosey LaDuca, Salina EsTitties and Spice receive negative critiques, with Loosey LaDuca being safe. Salina EsTitties and Spice lip-sync to "Thats What I Want" by Lil Nas X. Salina EsTitties wins the lip-sync and Spice sashays away.: Guest Judge: Julia Garner; Alternating Judge: Carson Kressley; Mini-Challenge: Photobomb classic Drag Race moments; Mini-Challenge Winner: Anetra; Mini-Challenge Prize: A $2,500 cash tip; Main Challenge: The Crystal Ball; Runway Themes: Start Your Engines, My Favorite Ball, and Crystallized Eleganza; Challenge Winner: Sasha Colby; Main Challenge Prize: A $5,000 cash tip; Bottom Two: Salina EsTitties and Spice; Lip-Sync Song: "Thats What I Want" by Lil Nas X; Eliminated: Spice; Farewell Message: "It's been SO easy and SO FUN! Thank you for being my new sisters when my real one left me!!!! ps. Where does the dingaling go ? <3 Spice"
201	10	"50/50's Most Gagworthy Stars"	March 3, 2023
For this week's main challenge, the queens interview celebrities for 50/50.: Anetra, Loosey LaDuca and Malaysia Babydoll Foxx interview Frankie Grande; Luxx Noir London, Mistress Isabelle Brooks and Salina EsTitties interview Love Connie; Marcia Marcia Marcia and Sasha Colby interview Charo; On the runway, category is Night of a Thousand Beyoncé's. Loosey LaDuca, Luxx Noir London and Sasha Colby receive positive critiques, with Sasha Colby winning the challenge. Malaysia Babydoll Foxx, Mistress Isabelle Brooks and Salina EsTitties receive negative critiques, with Mistress Isabelle Brooks being safe. Malaysia Babydoll Foxx and Salina EsTitties lip-sync to "Single Ladies (Put a Ring on It)" by Beyoncé. Salina EsTitties wins the lip-sync and Malaysia Babydoll Foxx sashays away.: Alternating Judge: Ts Madison; Main Challenge: Interview celebrities for 50/50; Runway Theme: Night of a Thousand Beyoncé's; Challenge Winner: Sasha Colby; Main Challenge Prize: A $5,000 cash tip; Bottom Two: Malaysia Babydoll Foxx and Salina EsTitties; Lip-Sync Song: "Single Ladies (Put a Ring on It)" by Beyoncé; Eliminated: Malaysia Babydoll Foxx; Farewell Message: "Remain Humble. The phattest and & baddest from Miami. Malaysia Babydoll Foxx"
202	11	"Two Queens, One Joke"	March 10, 2023
For this week's mini-challenge, the queens perform in the Harlem Vogue Ball. Anetra wins the mini-challenge. For the main challenge, the queens pair up to perform a stand-up comedy routine in the Bubly Comedy Festival.: Anetra and Sasha Colby; Loosey LaDuca and Luxx Noir London; Marcia Marcia Marcia; Mistress Isabelle Brooks and Salina EsTitties; On the runway, category is Rip Her to Shreds. Loosey LaDuca, Luxx Noir London, Mistress Isabelle Brooks and Salina EsTitties receive positive critiques, with Loosey LaDuca and Luxx Noir London both winning the challenge. Anetra, Marcia Marcia Marcia and Sasha Colby receive negative critiques, with Sasha Colby being safe. Anetra and Marcia Marcia Marcia lip-sync to "Boss Bitch" by Doja Cat. Anetra wins the lip-sync and Marcia Marcia Marcia sashays away.: Guest Judge: Ali Wong; Alternating Judge: Ts Madison; Mini-Challenge: Harlem Vogue Ball; Mini-Challenge Winner: Anetra; Mini-Challenge Prize: A $2,500 cash tip; Main Challenge: In pairs, perform a stand-up comedy routine in the Bubly Comedy Festival; Runway Theme: Rip Her to Shreds; Challenge Winners: Loosey LaDuca and Luxx Noir London; Main Challenge Prize: A $5,000 cash tip each; Bottom Two: Anetra and Marcia Marcia Marcia; Lip-Sync Song: "Boss Bitch" by Doja Cat; Eliminated: Marcia Marcia Marcia; Farewell Message: "You know what they say : "There's no place like home" I love you! Marcia x3"
203	12	"Wigloose: The Rusical!"	March 17, 2023
For this week's main challenge, the queens perform in Wigloose: The Rusical!.: Anetra plays Mama Bacon; Loosey LaDuca plays Heaven Bacon; Luxx Noir London plays Christian; Mistress Isabelle Brooks plays Preacher Teacher; Salina EsTitties plays Tuck; Sasha Colby plays Carl; On the runway, category is Everybody Say Glove! Anetra, Luxx Noir London, Mistress Isabelle Brooks and Sasha Colby receive positive critiques, with Anetra winning the challenge. Loosey LaDuca and Salina EsTitties receive negative critiques, and are announced as the bottom two. They lip-sync to "Running Up That Hill" by Kate Bush. Loosey LaDuca wins the lip-sync and Salina EsTitties sashays away.: Guest Judge: Orville Peck; Alternating Judge: Ross Mathews; Main Challenge: Wigloose: The Rusical!; Runway Theme: Everybody Say Glove!; Challenge Winner: Anetra; Main Challenge Prize: A $5,000 cash tip; Bottom Two: Loosey LaDuca and Salina EsTitties; Lip-Sync Song: "Running Up That Hill" by Kate Bush; Eliminated: Salina EsTitties; Farewell Message: "Guess I Got What I "Deserved" ♡ Love You Hoes"
204	13	"Teacher Makeovers"	March 24, 2023
For this week's mini-challenge, the queens vote in rounds to assign superlatives to their fellow queens. Loosey LaDuca wins the mini-challenge. For the main challenge, the queens makeover school teachers for Teacher Appreciation Week. On the runway, category is Drag Family Resemblance. Anetra, Mistress Isabelle Brooks and Sasha Colby receive positive critiques, with Anetra winning the challenge. Loosey LaDuca and Luxx Noir London receive negative critiques, and are announced as the bottom two. They lip-sync to "For the Girls" by Hayley Kiyoko. Luxx Noir London wins the lip-sync and Loosey LaDuca sashays away.: Guest Judge: Hayley Kiyoko; Alternating Judge: Ross Mathews; Mini-Challenge: Spill The T; Mini-Challenge Winner: Loosey LaDuca; Mini-Challenge Prize: $5,000 worth of Anastasia Beverly Hills Cosmetics; Main Challenge: Makeover school teachers for Teacher Appreciation Week; Runway Theme: Drag Family Resemblance; Challenge Winner: Anetra; Main Challenge Prize: A $5,000 cash tip each for Anetra and her makeover partner; Bottom Two: Loosey LaDuca and Luxx Noir London; Lip-Sync Song: "For the Girls" by Hayley Kiyoko; Eliminated: Loosey LaDuca; Farewell Message: "Das fucked up! Love you hookers. Don't forget to Let Loose! xoxo Loosey."
205	14	"Blame It on the Edit"	March 31, 2023
For the final challenge of the season, the queens write, record and perform their own verses to RuPaul's song "Blame It on the Edit". On the runway, category is Drag Excellence. Luxx Noir London and Sasha Colby receive positive critiques, with Sasha Colby winning the challenge. Anetra and Mistress Isabelle Brooks receive negative critiques, and are announced as the bottom two. They lip-sync to "When Love Takes Over" by David Guetta ft. Kelly Rowland. Both queens win the lip-sync and no one goes home.: Alternating Judge: Ross Mathews; Main Challenge: Write, record and perform their own verses to RuPaul's song "Blame It on the Edit"; Runway Theme: Drag Excellence; Challenge Winner: Sasha Colby; Main Challenge Prize: A $5,000 cash tip; Bottom Two: Anetra and Mistress Isabelle Brooks; Lip-Sync Song: "When Love Takes Over" by David Guetta ft. Kelly Rowland; Eliminated: None
206	15	"Reunited!"	April 7, 2023
The queens all return for the reunion. Salina EsTitties receives the Golden Boot Award for her episode three Metallica look.
207	16	"Grand Finale"	April 14, 2023
All the queens return for the grand finale. The final four queens then perform to a song that was written specifically for them. Anetra lip-syncs to "Lotus", Luxx Noir London lip-syncs to "It's Giving Fashion", Mistress Isabelle Brooks lip-syncs to "Delusion", and Sasha Colby lip-syncs to "Goddess". After their performances, RuPaul tells the queens that only two queens will be advancing to the final lip-sync of the season. It is announced that the final two queens are Anetra and Sasha Colby, meaning Luxx Noir London and Mistress Isabelle Brooks are eliminated. It is then announced that Malaysia Babydoll Foxx is this season's Miss Congeniality. Anetra and Sasha Colby lip-sync to "Knock on Wood" by Amii Stewart. It is announced that Sasha Colby is the winner, leaving Anetra as the runner-up.: Finals venue: Ace Hotel, Los Angeles, California; Final Four: Anetra, Luxx Noir London, Mistress Isabelle Brooks, and Sasha Colby; Eliminated: Luxx Noir London and Mistress Isabelle Brooks; Miss Congeniality: Malaysia Babydoll Foxx; Final Two: Anetra and Sasha Colby; Lip Sync Song: "Knock on Wood" by Amii Stewart; Runner-up: Anetra; Winner of RuPaul's Drag Race Season Fifteen: Sasha Colby

== Ratings ==
Viewership and ratings per episode of RuPaul's Drag Race season 15
No.	Title	Air date	Rating (18–49)	Viewers (millions)
1	"One Night Only, Part 1"	January 6, 2023	0.29	0.752
2	"One Night Only, Part 2"	January 6, 2023	0.26	0.698
3	"All Queens Go to Heaven"	January 13, 2023	0.21	0.593
4	"Supersized Snatch Game"	January 20, 2023	0.22	0.578
5	"House of Fashion"	January 27, 2023	0.29	0.729
6	"Old Friends Gold"	February 3, 2023	0.21	0.634
7	"The Daytona Wind 2"	February 10, 2023	0.22	0.593
8	"Lip Sync LaLaPaRuZa Smackdown"	February 17, 2023	0.25	0.608
9	"The Crystal Ball: Episode 200"	February 24, 2023	0.25	0.663
10	"50/50's Most Gagworthy Stars"	March 3, 2023	0.24	0.663
11	"Two Queens, One Joke"	March 10, 2023	0.21	0.601
12	"Wigloose: The Rusical!"	March 17, 2023	0.20	0.510
13	"Teacher Makeovers"	March 24, 2023	0.21	0.540
14	"Blame It on the Edit"	March 31, 2023	0.18	0.511
15	"Reunited!"	April 7, 2023	0.15	0.415
16	"Grand Finale"	April 14, 2023	0.27	0.660
