= Bubly Sparkling Water =

Brand of carbonated water

Bubly
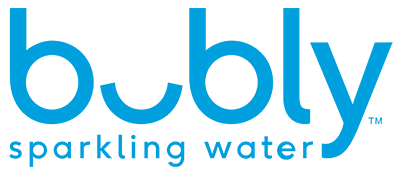
- Product type: Sparkling water
- Current owner: PepsiCo
- Country: United States
- Introduced: February 1, 2018; 8 years ago
- Markets: United States, Canada, Australia, New Zealand
- Website: www.bubly.com

Bubly Sparkling Water, or simply Bubly, is a line of flavored sparkling water distributed by PepsiCo. Distribution of the product first began in February 2018, with eight flavors introduced as part of the initial line-up. The brand is aimed at competing in the growing market for healthier alternatives to traditional soft drinks, primarily against other sparkling water brands such as La Croix.

== Product ==
Bubly is available for purchase in 12 oz. cans or 20 oz. bottles, with packaging containing a personal message and a greeting printed on the tab or cap. All varieties of Bubly are sugar-free and claimed to contain no artificial sweeteners, composed only of sparkling water and natural flavors. The initial line-up of bubly consisted of lemon, lime, orange, grapefruit, strawberry, apple, mango, and cherry flavors. However, the brand has expanded to include blackberry, peach, raspberry, cranberry, pineapple, passionfruit, watermelon, coconut pineapple, blueberry-pomegranate, and white-peach-ginger varieties. An unflavored version, under the name "justbubly" is also available.

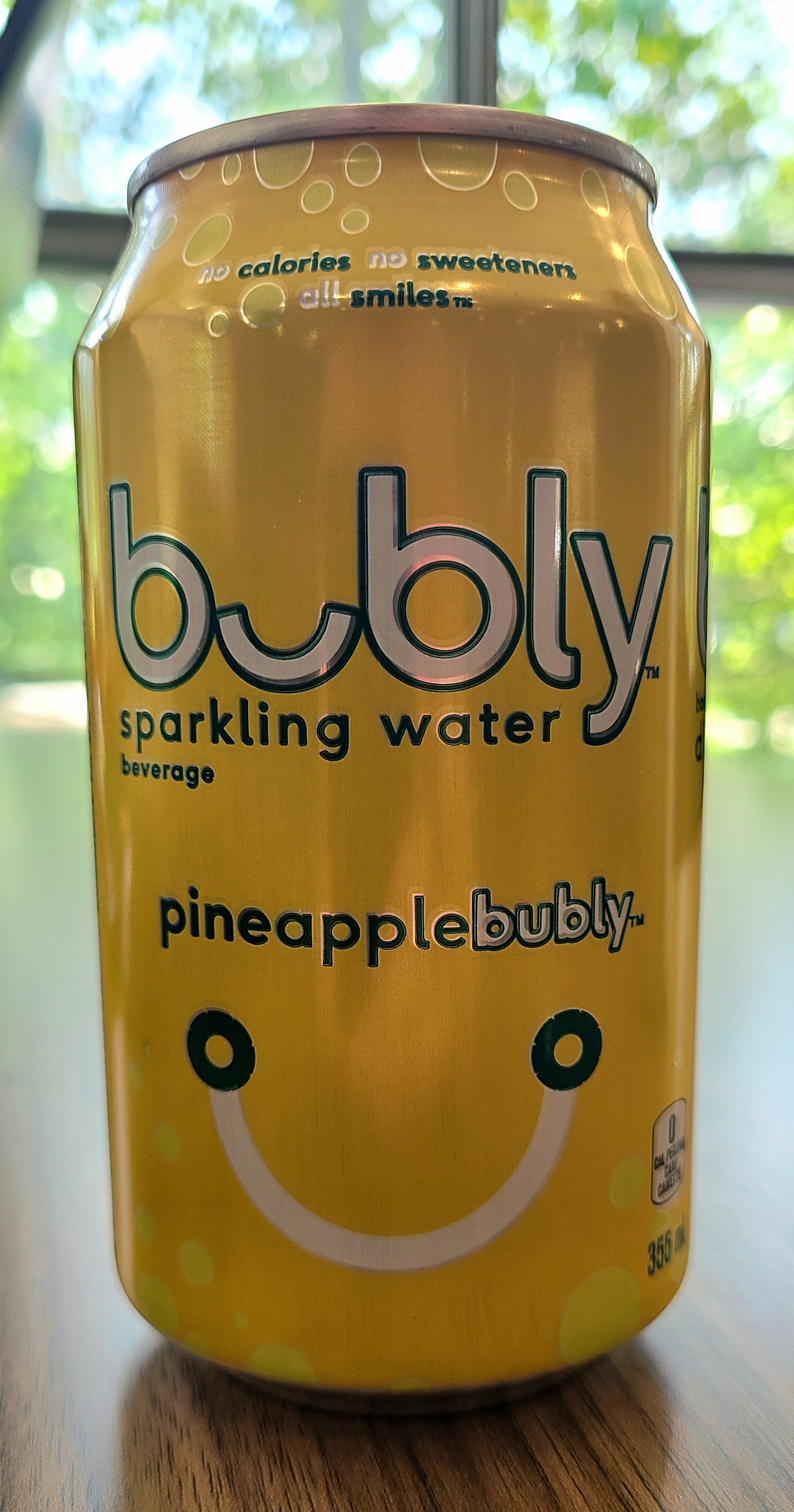
Bubly sparkling water pineapple flavor

In 2021, a line of caffeinated sparkling water drinks was introduced under the name bubly bounce, each containing 35 mg of caffeine. Bubly bounce is produced in mango-passion fruit, blueberry-pomegranate, triple-berry, citrus-cherry, and blood orange-grapefruit varieties. In 2022, Bubly introduced the limited-edition Belini Bliss flavor, their first mocktail offering. In 2023, Bubly introduced a line of dessert-inspired sparkling waters, comprising orange cream, key lime pie, and lemon sorbet flavors.

In March 2024, PepsiCo introduced a new Bubly Burst beverage line, which contains fruit juices that provide a stronger flavor and color than their regular counterparts. Unlike the standard Bubly range, burst drinks are only available in 16.9oz plastic bottles.

== Availability ==
Bubly was first launched in the United States and Canada in February 2018. In May 2023, PepsiCo expanded the brand into the Australian and New Zealand markets.

== Advertising ==
Bubly aired a commercial starring Canadian singer Michael Bublé during Super Bowl LIII in 2019, in which the singer repeatedly pronounces the beverage's name like his own (boo-BLAY) rather than as "bubbly", much to the chagrin of a store's clerk. Bublé would appear in subsequent advertising campaigns for the beverage, particularly in his native Canada, and PepsiCo first released a special "Merry Berry Bublé" flavor for the holiday season in 2021.
