= Aura Mayari =

Filipino-American drag performer

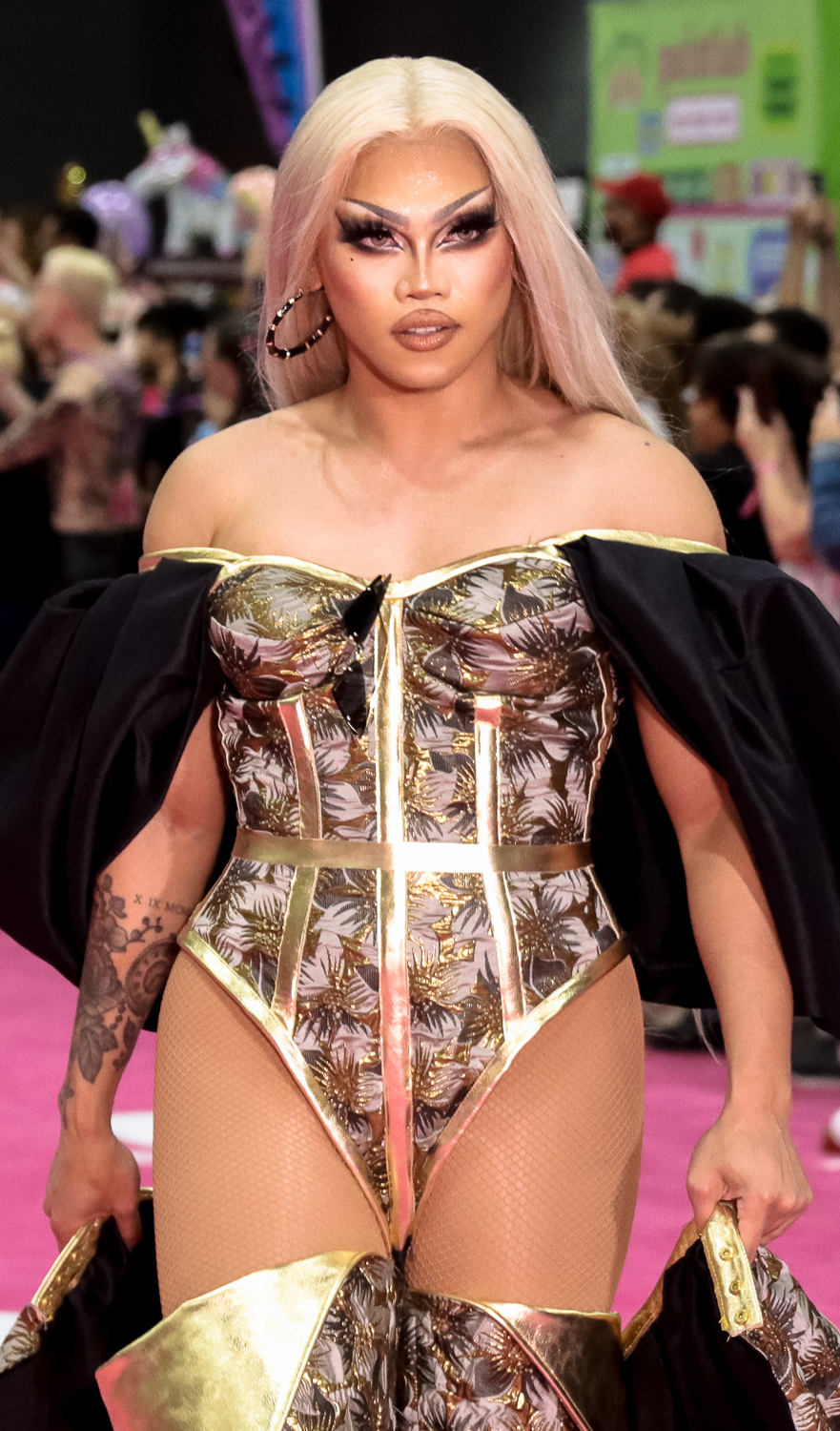
- Aura Mayari at RuPaul's DragCon LA, 2023
- Born: Jay-R de Leon; Pasay, Metro Manila, Philippines
- Occupation: Drag queen
- Television: RuPaul's Drag Race (season 15)
- Website: auramayari.com

Aura Mayari is the stage name of Jay-R de Leon, a Filipino-American drag performer most known for competing on the fifteenth season of RuPaul's Drag Race and the eleventh season of RuPaul's Drag Race All Stars.

== Early life ==
Jay-R de Leon was born and raised in the Philippines. His family struggled living there and relocated to the United States in 2003, when de Leon was a child. de Leon's family lived in Chicago.

== Career ==
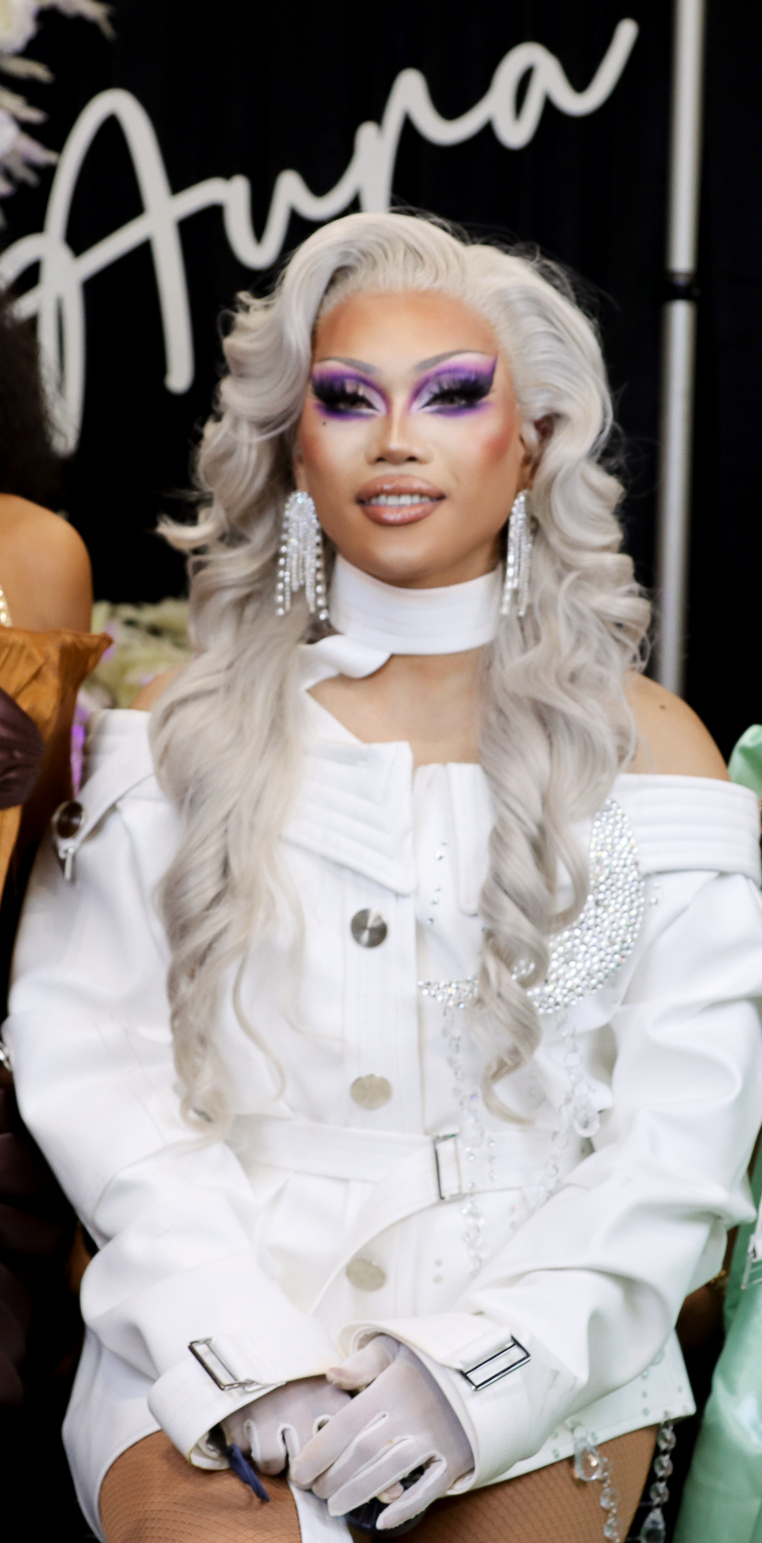
Aura Mayari at RuPaul's DragCon LA in 2023

de Leon discovered drag in Chicago while playing the role of Angel in Rent (musical). He moved to Nashville, Tennessee and began performing at Play full time in 2021.

In 2023, de Leon competed as Aura Mayari on the fifteenth season of RuPaul's Drag Race. She won the girl group challenge and placed eleventh overall. Aura Mayari was eliminated on the seventh episode after placing in the bottom two in an acting challenge, then losing a lip-sync battle against Jax to "Sweetest Pie" (2022) by Dua Lipa and Megan Thee Stallion. Aura Mayari later admitted she had forgotten the lyrics to the song and mouthed gibberish. She also said "lack of sleep and the construction of her runway 'limited' her performance", according to Gay Times.

Queerty's Cameron Scheetz called her time on the show "memorable" and said "she served up some fierce dance moves, sickening runway fashion, and enough 'boy Aura' photos to earn the (self-proclaimed) moniker of the 'horniest queen of the season'". The website also described her as "the world’s premier Filipino-American frat bro turned drag sorority sis".

In 2024, she released a single called "Dungeon" and in December 2025, she was announced to be cast in the musical Here Lies Love as Imeldific in Los Angeles, California at the Mark Taper Forum.

In April 2026, Mayari was announced to be competing in the eleventh season of RuPaul's Drag Race All Stars in the second bracket. Her season 15 castmate Salina EsTitties is also competing in the same bracket.

== Personal life ==
According to Vogue, Aura Mayari is "named after the goddess of the moon and the ruler of the night in Kapampangan mythology". Her name is also inspired by the Filipino gay slang term "awra".

On the season 15 reunion episode, de Leon revealed he is engaged to be married.

== Discography ==
=== Singles ===
==== As lead artist ====
Year	Title	Album	Writer(s)	Producer(s)
2026	"Feel the Aura"	Non-album singles	Jann Rick de Leon, Drew Louis, Michelle Zarlenga	Drew Louis
2024	"Dungeon"	Non-album singles	Jay-R de Leon, Kofi Owusu-Ofori, Carl Seanté McGrier	No producers credited

==== As featured artist ====
Title	Year	Album	Ref.
"One Night Only" (with the cast of RuPaul's Drag Race season 15)	2023	Non-album singles	
"Golden Years (Rockin' Old Gs)" (with Malaysia Babydoll Foxx, Sasha Colby & Spice)	2023	Non-album singles	

== Filmography ==
=== Television ===
Year	Title	Role	Notes	Ref.
2023	RuPaul's Drag Race (season 15)	Herself/Contestant	11th place	
2023	RuPaul's Drag Race: Untucked	Herself/Contestant	11th place	

- RuPaul's Drag Race All Stars (season 11)

=== Web series ===
Year	Title	Role	Notes	Ref.
2023	Meet the Queens	Herself	Stand-alone special RuPaul's Drag Race (season 15)	
2023	EW News Flash	Herself	Guest	
2023	BuzzFeed Celeb	Herself	Guest	
2023	MTV News	Herself	Guest	
2023	Today with Hoda and Jenna	Herself	Guest	
2023	Drip or Drop	Herself	Guest	
2023	Whatcha Packin'	Herself	Guest	

== See also ==
- List of Filipino Americans
- List of people from Nashville, Tennessee
