= Anetra =

American drag queen

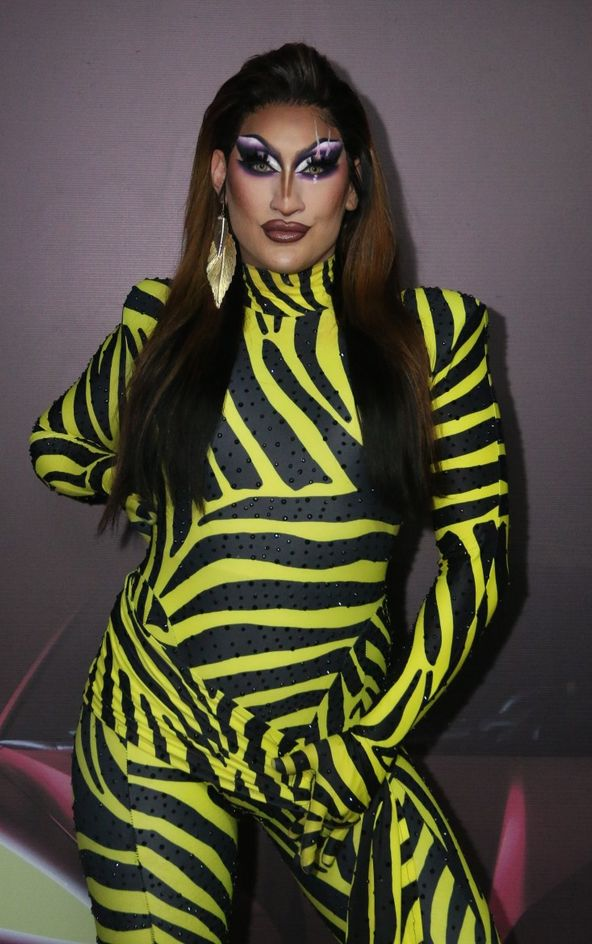
- Anetra at the RuPaul's Drag Race season 15 premiere, 2023
- Born: Isaiah Padua
- Occupation: Drag queen
- Television: RuPaul's Drag Race (season 15)

Anetra is the stage name of Isaiah Padua, an American drag queen. Anetra was runner-up on the 15th season of RuPaul's Drag Race.

== Career ==
Anetra was cast for and competed in the fifteenth season of RuPaul's Drag Race. She won three challenges and placed in the final two, finishing as runner-up to Sasha Colby.

One of the challenges Anetra won was the talent show (episode "One Night Only, Part 2"). Her performance included "duck-walking, taekwondo moves, and a fierce original song", according to Pride.com's Bernardo Sim. The song was the first Anetra ever recorded, which she created after taking an edible. Anetra's performance became "the most-viewed cross-platform scene ever published to RuPaul's Drag Race social media accounts with over 13.1 million views across Instagram, TikTok, Facebook, YouTube Shorts, and Twitter". This performance also made her the queen with the biggest amount of growth on social media from Season 15, gaining more than 500,000 followers on Instagram while the season was airing. Stephen Daw of Billboard called her performance "iconic", and Charlie Duncan of PinkNews said the song's phrase "walk that fucking duck" is "set to be the catchphrase that will define season 15". Sam Damshenas of Gay Times wrote, "Anetra's martial arts lip-sync extravaganza has been hailed as one of the best talent show performances in Drag Race herstory." Screen Rant's Michelle Konopka Alonzo included Anetra in a list of 15 "queens who made amazing first impressions" on Drag Race and said she "quickly became a fan favorite and internet sensation after the premiere". Lizzo shared a video of herself lip-syncing to the song.

Anetra also won the Rusical challenge on episode 12, in which she portrayed Mama Bacon in "Wigloose: The Rusical!", as well as episode 13's makeover challenge. In the lip-sync marathon episode, Anetra competed against Sasha Colby to Fifth Harmony's "I'm in Love with a Monster", against Jax and Luxx Noir London to Vanessa Williams' "The Right Stuff", and against Jax to "Finally" by CeCe Peniston. In episode 11, Anetra placed in the bottom two and had to lip sync against Marcia Marcia Marcia to "Boss Bitch" by Doja Cat. The battle became season 15's first to reach one million views on YouTube. Coleman Spilde of The Daily Beast said "we'll always remember where we were" in describing Anetra's "running jump-and-dive into a somersault" over Marcia Marcia Marcia.

In June 2023, Anetra was awarded the key to the city of Las Vegas, and June 22 was subsequently pronounced "Anetra Day" in the city.

== Personal life ==
Anetra is based in Las Vegas, Nevada and has a Filipino, German, Japanese, and Puerto Rican background. She attended Desert Oasis High School. She is a former competitive taekwondo fighter, training from the age of 7. She has stated that taekwondo helped her embrace and find strength in her Asian heritage. A week after Anetra's mother discovered her drag, she was kicked out of her home, abruptly estranging her from her siblings. Anetra's father accepted her and took her in. She and her father bonded while watching Drag Race during COVID-19 lockdowns, and were especially fond of Filipina queen Rock M. Sakura.

== Discography ==
=== As a featured artist ===
Title	Year	Album	Ref.
"One Night Only" (with the cast of RuPaul's Drag Race, season 15)	2023	—N/a	
"Golden Hips (Ol' Dirty Bitches)" (with Robin Fierce, Jax, and Loosey LaDuca)	2023	—N/a	
"Wigloose: The Rusical!" (with the cast of RuPaul's Drag Race, season 15)	2023	Wigloose: The Rusical! Album	
"Blame It on the Edit" (RuPaul ft. Luxx Noir London, Mistress Isabelle Brooks, and Sasha Colby)	2023	—N/a	
"Lotus"	2023	—N/a	

== Filmography ==
=== Television ===
List of television credits
Year	Title	Role	Notes	Ref.
2023	RuPaul's Drag Race (season 15)	Herself/Contestant	Runner-up	
2023	RuPaul's Drag Race: Untucked	Herself/Contestant	Runner-up	

=== Web series ===
List of web series credits
Year	Title	Role	Notes	Ref.
2023	Meet the Queens	Herself	Stand-alone special RuPaul's Drag Race (season 15)	
2023	EW News Flash	Herself	Guest	
2023	Pride Today	Herself	Guest	
2023	BuzzFeed Celeb	Herself	Guest	
2023	MTV News	Herself	Guest	
2023	Today with Hoda and Jenna	Herself	Guest	
2023	Drip or Drop	Herself	Guest	
2023	Whatcha Packin'	Herself	Guest	

=== Music videos ===
Year	Title	Artist	Ref.
2023	"Blame It on the Edit"	RuPaul ft. Luxx Noir London, Sasha Colby & Mistress Isabelle Brooks	

== See also ==
- List of Filipino Americans
- List of people from Las Vegas
