= Loosey LaDuca =

American drag performer

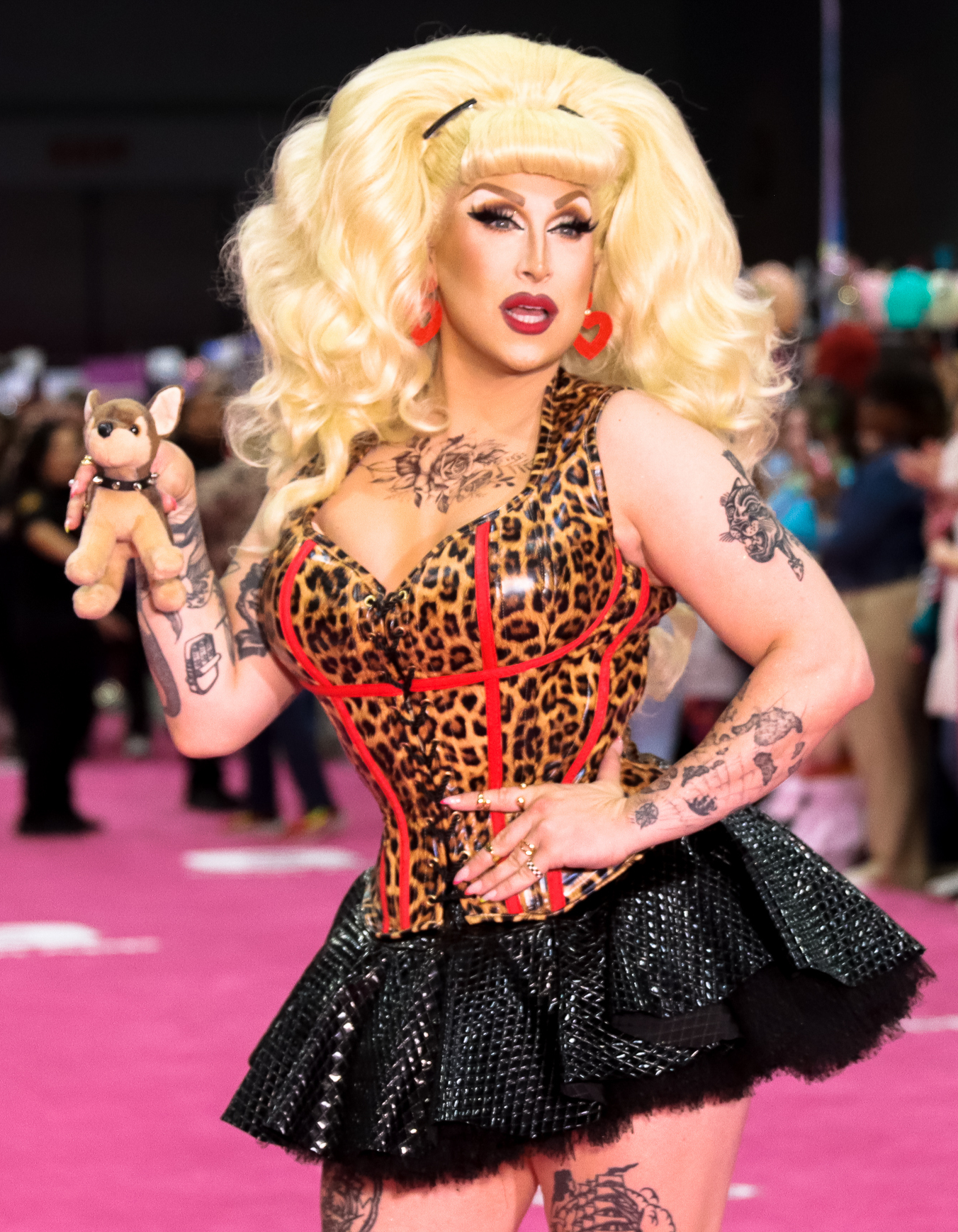
- Loosey LaDuca at RuPaul's DragCon LA, 2023
- Born: Timothy P. Rinaldi; 1989 or 1990 (age 35–36); Ansonia, Connecticut, U.S.
- Occupations: Construction worker; drag queen
- Television: RuPaul's Drag Race (season 15)

Loosey LaDuca is the stage name of Timothy P. Rinaldi, an American drag performer who is best known for competing on the fifteenth season of the television series RuPaul's Drag Race. Rinaldi is from Ansonia, Connecticut, and was a construction worker before appearing on Drag Race. Loosey LaDuca's original song "Let Loose", which debuted on the show, went viral and received a remix featuring Jan Sport and Lemon.

== Early life, education, and early career ==
Timothy Rinaldi is from Ansonia, Connecticut, and was born in 1989 or 1990. He attended Ansonia Middle School and high school, where he participated in musical theater. Rinaldi worked as a construction worker in Ansonia. After portraying one of Cinderella's sisters in a production of Cinderella at Downtown Cabaret Theater in Bridgeport, Connecticut, Rinaldi realized he "had what it took to be a drag queen". He has since performed in many drag brunch shows.

== RuPaul's Drag Race and "Let Loose" ==
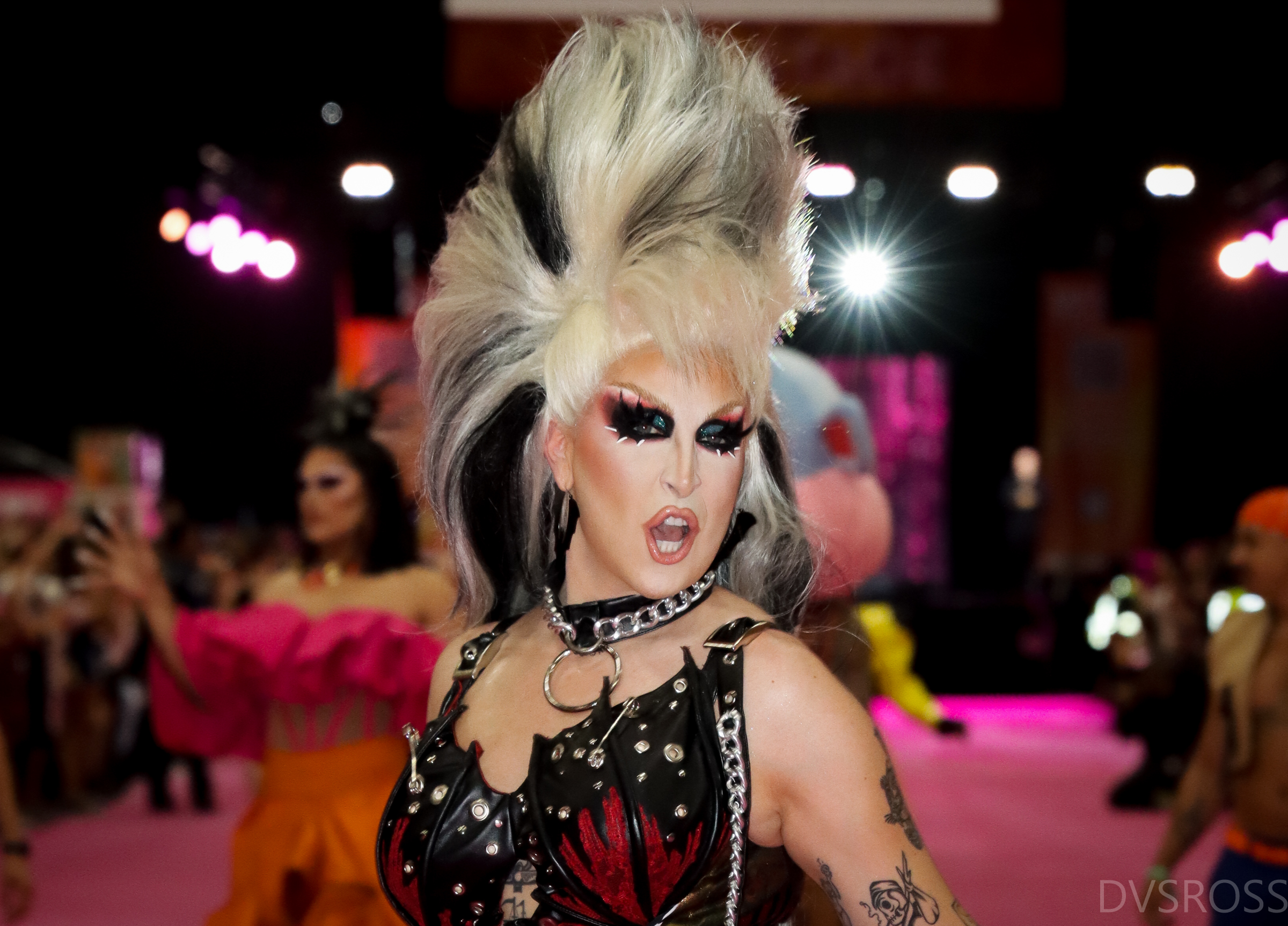
Loosey LaDuca at RuPaul's DragCon LA in 2024

Rinaldi competed as Loosey LaDuca on the fifteenth season of the American television show RuPaul's Drag Race. She debuted the original song "Let Loose" during the variety show. According to Stephan Daw of Billboard, "Let Loose" went "ultra-viral" following Loosey LaDuca's talent-show performance. Bernardo Sim of Out said the song became "a huge viral hit". Loosey LaDuca released a remix of the song that features Jan Sport and Lemon.

Loosey LaDuca also impersonated Dolly Parton and Joan Rivers on Drag Race; she was declared a winner in the fourth ("Supersized Snatch Game") and eleventh ("Two Queens, One Joke") episodes, and placed in the bottom two in the twelfth and thirteenth episodes. Kevin Bacon praised Loosey LaDuca for her performance in Wigloose: The Rusical!, a parody of the 1984 film Footloose. In her first lip-sync, she defeated Salina EsTitties to Kate Bush's song "Running Up That Hill" (1985). She was eliminated from the competition after losing a lip-sync to "For the Girls" by Hayley Kiyoko against Luxx Noir London.

Paper magazine's Sanda Song said Loosey LaDuca is "one of season 15's most memorable contestants—and for good reason", and Cameron Scheetz of Queerty said she "gave us nothing but real: Real emotion, real drama, real star-power, and real good reality television". Sim included LaDuca in a 2023 list of ten contestants who received a "delusional" edit on Drag Race and wrote, "Throughout the edit of the show, LaDuca was shown passionately disagreeing with the judges, arguing with other queens over who got second and third top placements, and seemingly not understanding when her costars were just kidding around." Writing for Pride.com, Sim said, "There's absolutely no way that someone can walk away from watching season 15 without remembering how LaDuca was portrayed on the show." Loosey LaDuca has said she felt "robbed" and had earned a spot as a finalist.

== Personal life ==
Loosey LaDuca uses the pronouns she/her while in drag; her persona is based on Lucille Ball and the LaDuca dance shoes worn by members of the precision dance company The Rockettes. In addition to her characterizations on Drag Race, Loosey LaDuca has impersonated Cyndi Lauper and Madonna.

== Discography ==
=== Singles ===
List of singles, showing the year released, and album name
Title	Year	Album
"Let Loose"	2023	—N/a
"Let Loose (remix)" (featuring Jan & Lemon)	2023	—N/a

=== As a featured artist ===
Title	Year	Album	Ref.
"One Night Only" (with the cast of RuPaul's Drag Race, season 15)	2023	—N/a	
"Golden Hips (Ol' Dirty Bitches)" (with Robin Fierce, Jax, and Anetra)	2023	—N/a	
"Wigloose: The Rusical!" (with the cast of RuPaul's Drag Race, season 15)	2023	Wigloose: The Rusical! Album	

== Filmography ==
=== Television ===
List of television credits
Year	Title	Role	Ref.
2022	RuPaul's Drag Race (season 15)	Herself/Contestant	
2022	RuPaul's Drag Race: Untucked	Herself/Contestant	

=== Web series ===
Year	Title	Role	Notes	Ref
2023	Meet the Queens	Herself	Stand-alone special RuPaul's Drag Race season 15	
2023	EW News Flash	Herself	Guest	
2023	BuzzFeed Celeb	Herself	Guest	
2023	MTV News	Herself	Guest	
2023	Today with Hoda and Jenna	Herself	Guest	
2023	Drip or Drop	Herself	Guest	
2023	Whatcha Packin'	Herself	Guest	
2023	Squirrel Friends	Herself	Guest; Podcast	
2023	Glam Slam	Herself	Contestant	
2024	Very Delta	Herself	Guest; Podcast	

== See also ==
- List of people from Connecticut
