= Luxx Noir London =

American drag performer

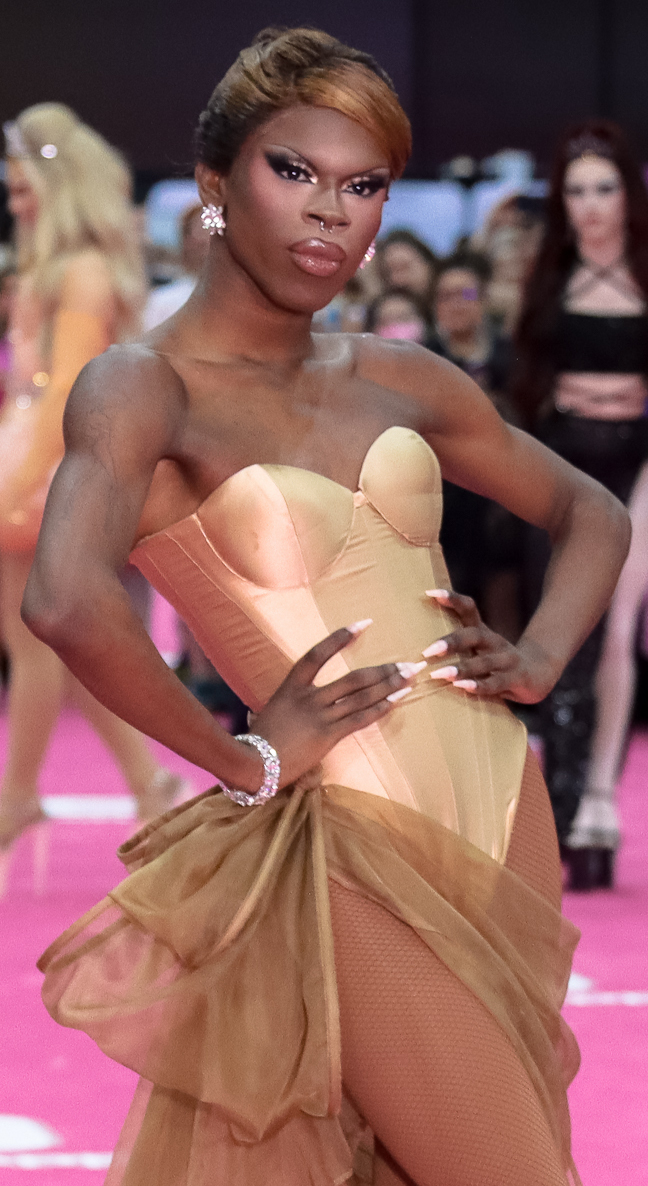
- Luxx Noir London at RuPaul's DragCon LA, 2023
- Born: Justin R. Reed; September 5, 1999 (age 27); East Orange, New Jersey, U.S.
- Education: New Jersey City University
- Occupations: Drag queen; singer; songwriter
- Years active: 2018–present
- Television: RuPaul's Drag Race (season 15)
- Musical career
- Instrument: Vocals

Luxx Noir London is the stage name of Justin R. Reed (born September 5, 1999), an American drag performer, singer and songwriter most known for competing on the fifteenth season of RuPaul's Drag Race.

== Early life and education ==
Luxx Noir London was raised in East Orange, New Jersey. She attended the Cicely Tyson School of Performing and Fine Arts and studied toward a BFA in musical theater from New Jersey City University. She credits her parents for always supporting her and instilling values of self-love and confidence.

== Career ==
Luxx Noir London was first exposed to drag from watching RuPaul's Drag Race, and she started doing drag in 2018. Originally she considered "Kitty Noir" and "Luxury Noir", before choosing "Luxx Noir London" as her drag name. She has performed in Asbury Park, New Jersey, and at New York City's annual Bushwig festival. Luxx Noir London released her debut single "Round and Around" on April 9, 2021. She told Cosmopolitan that she wrote the song "probably [in] 30 minutes during quarantine".

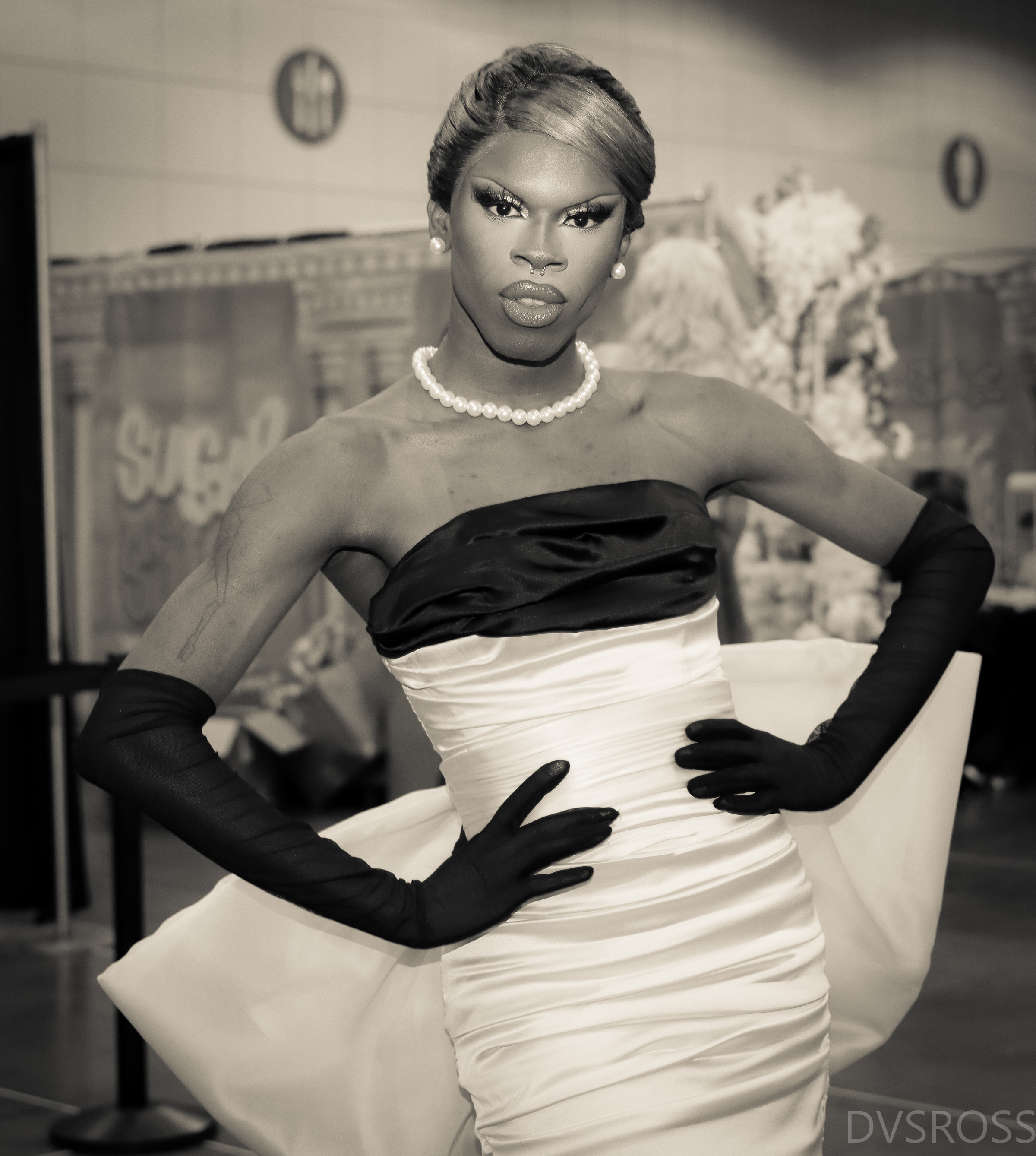
Luxx Noir London at RuPaul's DragCon LA in 2023

Luxx Noir London competed on the fifteenth season of RuPaul's Drag Race (2023). She was declared a winner in the fifth and eleventh episodes, and placed in the bottom in the thirteenth episode alongside Loosey LaDuca. She portrayed Amanda Lepore during Snatch Game.

On the series' 200th episode, Luxx Noir London received praise from RuPaul for a runway look which paid tribute to the host. Luxx Noir London was a finalist with Anetra, Mistress Isabelle Brooks, and Sasha Colby. On the episode "Blame It on the Edit", all four finalists were featured in a remix of RuPaul's 2023 song of the same name, which also received a music video. In the finale, she performed to an original song "It's Giving Fashion". Luxx Noir London finished in third/fourth place, alongside Mistress Isabelle Brooks.

Luxx Noir London and fellow contestant Jax were guest speakers for drag historian and author Joe E. Jeffreys' course at The New School about the impact of RuPaul's Drag Race.

== Personal life ==
Luxx Noir London has been a target of misogynoir by Drag Race fans; she has spoken about the discrimination she has received as a Black feminine drag queen.

== Discography ==
=== Studio albums ===
List of studio albums, with selected details
Title	Details	Ref.
Light in the Dark	Released: September 13, 2024; Label: Outerboro Records; Format: Digital download, streaming	

=== Extended plays ===
List of extended plays, with selected details
Title	Details	Ref.
Pretty Privilege	Released: July 9, 2021; Label: Haus of Luxx; Format: Digital download, streaming	
Killer	Released: October 21, 2022; Label: Haus of Luxx; Format: Digital download, streaming	

=== Singles ===
List of singles, showing the year released, and album name
Title	Year	Album
"Round and Around"	2021	Pretty Privilege
"Keep Up Next Time"	2021	Pretty Privilege
"The End"	2021	Non-album single
"Killer"	2022	Non-album single
"Light in the Dark"	2023	Light in the Dark
"Worship"	2024	Light in the Dark
"Cigarette"	2026	Non-album single

=== Promotional singles ===
List of promotional singles, showing the year released, and album name
Title	Year	Album	Ref.
"One Night Only" (with the cast of RuPaul's Drag Race, season 15)	2023	Non-album single	
"Golden Girlfriends (Banjo Bitches)" (with Marcia Marcia Marcia, Mistress Isabelle Brooks, and Salina EsTitties)	2023	Non-album single	
"Wigloose: The Rusical!" (with the cast of RuPaul's Drag Race, season 15)	2023	Wigloose: The Rusical! Album	
"Blame It on the Edit" (RuPaul ft. Anetra, Mistress Isabelle Brooks, and Sasha Colby)	2023	Non-album single	
"It's Giving Fashion"	2023	Non-album single	

=== Music videos ===
List of music videos, showing year released and directors
Title	Year	Album	Director(s)	Ref.
"Blame It on the Edit"	2023	Non-album single	—N/a	
"Let It All Hang Out"	2023	Light in the Dark	Nick Laughlin	
"Undress"	2025	Light in the Dark	Nick Laughlin	
"Cigarette"	2026	Non-album single	Nick Laughlin	

== Filmography ==
=== Television ===
List of television credits, showing the year released, and selected details
Year	Title	Role	Notes	Ref.
2023	RuPaul's Drag Race (season 15)	Herself/Contestant	3rd place	
2023	RuPaul's Drag Race: Untucked	Herself/Contestant	3rd place	
2024	Slaycation	Herself/Contestant	Winner	

=== Web series ===
List of webs series credits, showing the year released, and selected details
Year	Title	Role	Notes	Ref.
2021	Cosmo Queens	Herself	Guest	
2023	Meet the Queens	Herself	Stand-alone special RuPaul's Drag Race (season 15)	
2023	EW News Flash	Herself	Guest	
2023	Pride Today	Herself	Guest	
2023	BuzzFeed Celeb	Herself	Guest	
2023	MTV News	Herself	Guest	
2023	Today with Hoda and Jenna	Herself	Guest	
2023	Drip or Drop	Herself	Guest	
2023	Whatcha Packin’	Herself	Guest	
2023	Out of the Closet	Herself	Guest	
2023	Glam Slam	Herself	Contestant	
2024	Very Delta	Herself	Guest	
2024	Give It To Me Straight	Herself	Guest	

== See also ==
- List of people from New Jersey
