= Malaysia Babydoll Foxx =

American drag performer

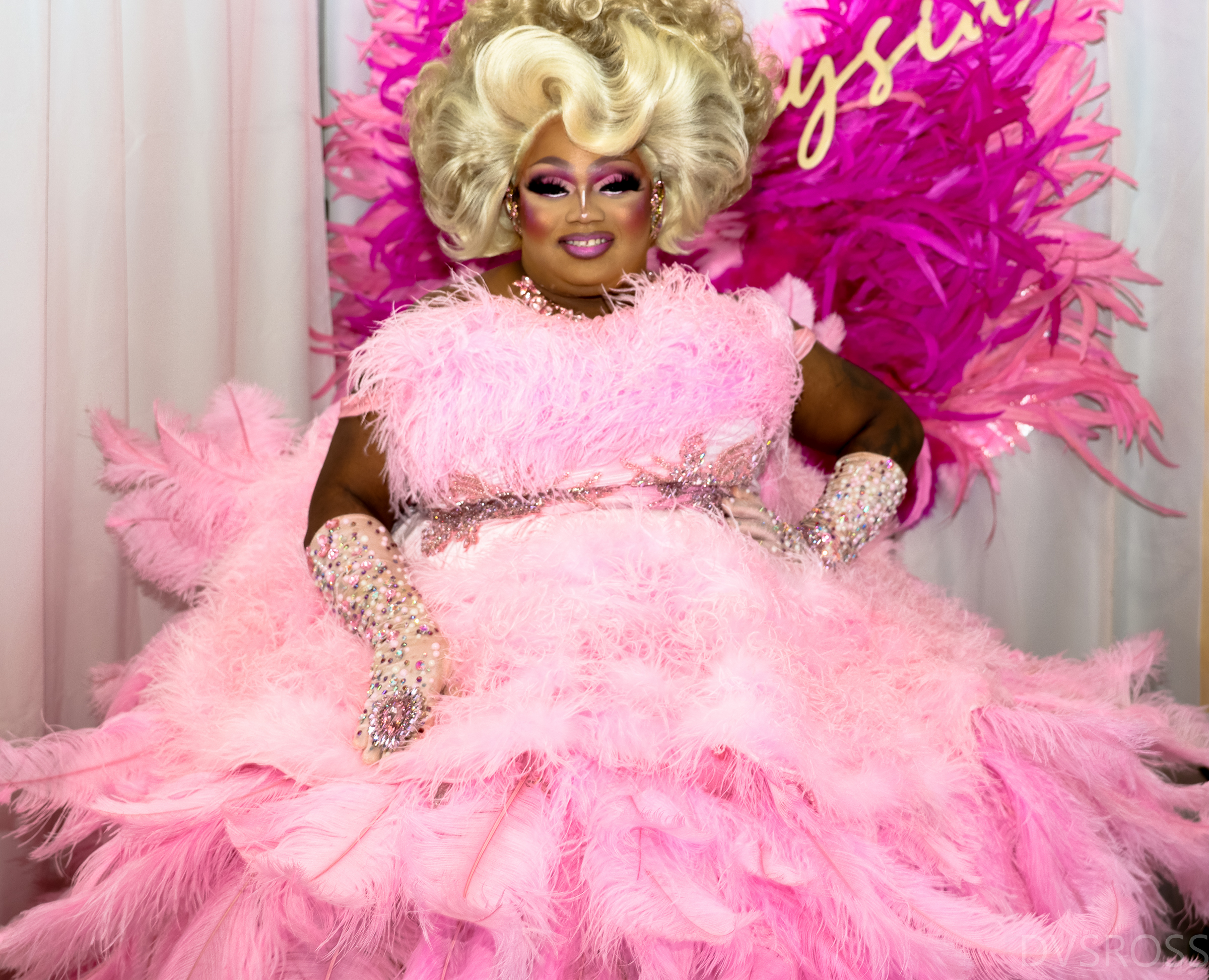
- Malaysia Babydoll Foxx at RuPaul's DragCon LA, 2023
- Occupations: Drag queen; hairdresser; make-up artist
- Television: RuPaul's Drag Race (season 15)

Malaysia Babydoll Foxx is an American drag performer, make-up artist, and hairdresser who competed on season 15 of RuPaul's Drag Race.

== Career ==
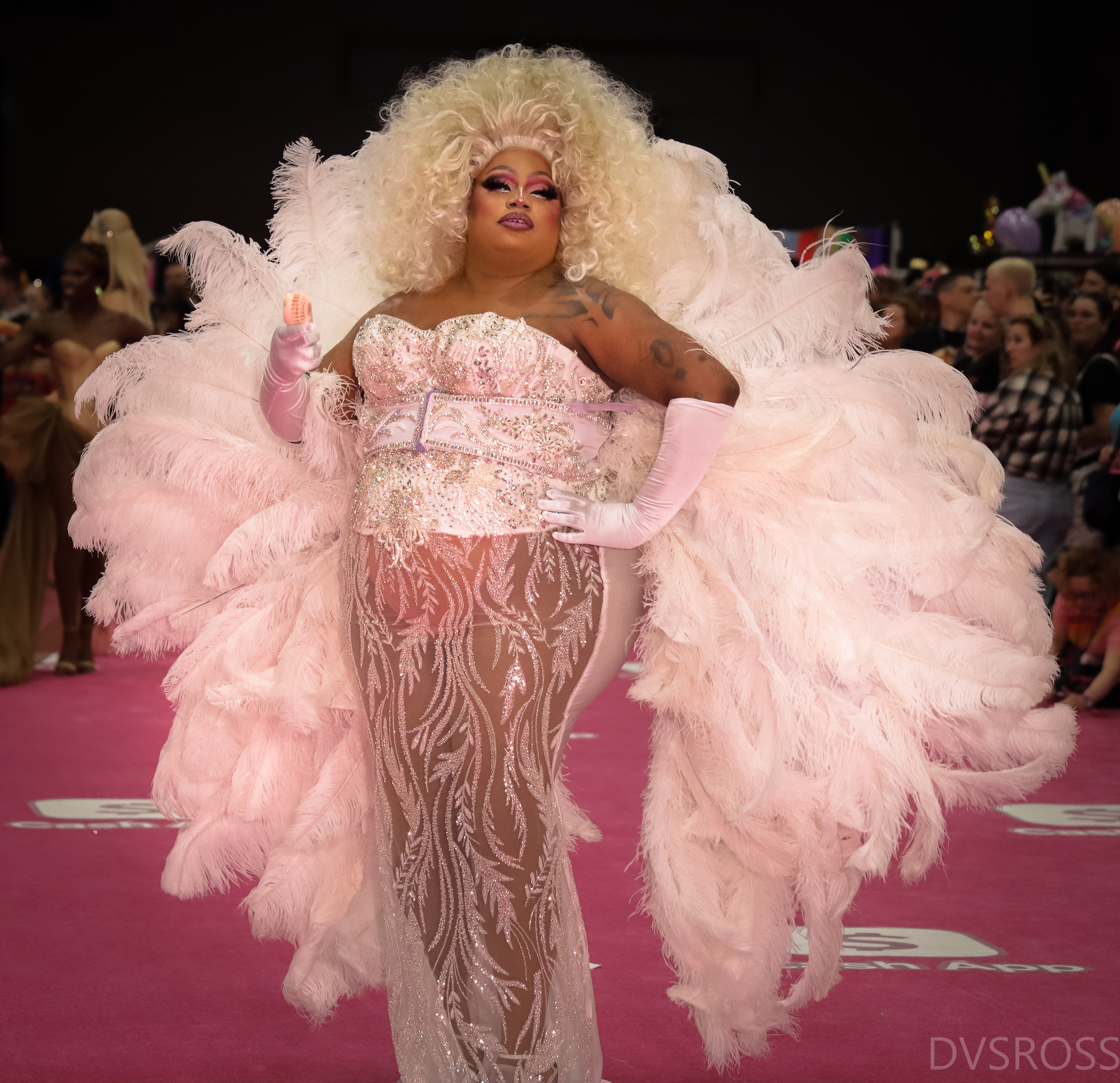
Malaysia Babydoll Foxx at RuPaul's DragCon LA in 2023

Malaysia Babydoll Foxx competed on season 15 of RuPaul's Drag Race. She was the first contestant on the series from Miami. Malaysia Babydoll Foxx impersonated Saucy Santana for the Snatch Game challenge. She was eliminated from the competition after placing in the bottom two of a challenge which involved cooking and an interview with Frankie Grande, then losing a lip sync against Salina EsTitties to "Single Ladies (Put a Ring on It)" (2008) by Beyoncé. Malaysia Babydoll Foxx placed eighth overall, and was named Miss Congeniality by her fellow contestants.

Outside of drag, Malaysia Babydoll Foxx is a professional make-up artist and hairdresser.

== Filmography ==
=== Television ===
- RuPaul's Drag Race (season 15)
