= Sugar and Spice (drag queens) =

American drag duo

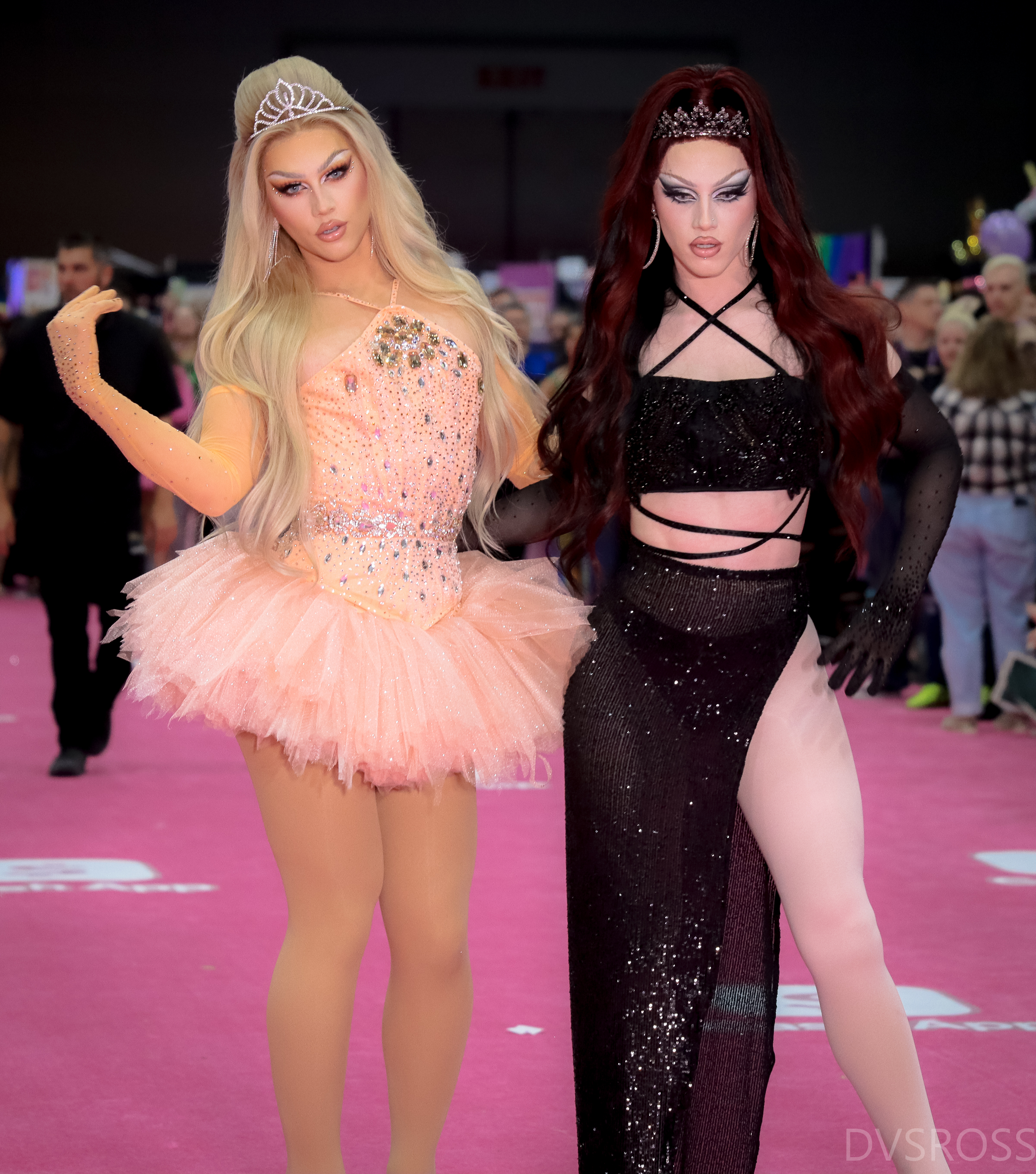
- Sugar (left) and Spice (right) at RuPaul's DragCon LA, 2023
- Born: Cooper Coyle (Sugar); Luca Coyle (Spice); Long Island, New York, U.S.
- Other name: Coyle Twins
- Occupation: Drag queens
- Television: RuPaul's Drag Race (season 15)

TikTok information
- Page: sugarandspice
- Followers: 7.7 million
- Last updated: May 11, 2025

Cooper Coyle and Luca Coyle, better known by their respective stage names Sugar Solay (Note: Previously known as simply Sugar.) and CallMeSpice (Note: Previously known as simply Spice.), are a twin sibling duo of American drag performers originally from Long Island, New York. They are best known for their presence on TikTok as well as being individual contestants on the fifteenth season of RuPaul's Drag Race.

== Early life ==
Cooper and Luca Coyle were born on July 19, 1998 in Long Island, New York. They were raised there with their older brother.

== Drag career ==
Sugar and Spice gained prominence on Vine as teenagers. On TikTok, the duo had more than 3.8 million followers by early 2021 and 7.4 million followers by 2023.

Sugar and Spice competed on the fifteenth season of RuPaul's Drag Race, which premiered in January 2023. They are the show's first sibling contestants. During the Snatch Game challenge, Sugar impersonated Trisha Paytas and Spice portrayed Miley Cyrus; they were both panned for their performances and were placed in the bottom two together. The duo performed a synchronized lip sync to Pat Benatar's "You Better Run", before Sugar was eliminated. Charlie Grey of Queerty wrote, "We knew the Sugar x Spice lipsync was destined to happen from the moment they were cast on the show together, and they did not disappoint. The pair put on a show complete with choreo, bits, and entirely too much fun — a perfect encapsulation of Sugar's run on this season." Out of 16 competitors, Sugar and Spice finished in 14th place and 9th place, respectively.

In November 2025, Sugar announced that she would be changing her stage name to Sugar Solay.

== Personal lives ==
Both Cooper and Luca are gay. The twins came out to their mother online. In 2022, they relocated from Long Island to the greater Los Angeles area. In 2023, fellow Season 15 contestant Mistress Isabelle Brooks "adopted" Sugar and Spice as her "drag daughters."

== Filmography ==
=== Television ===
Year	Title	Role	Ref
2023	RuPaul's Drag Race	Season 15 contestants	
2023	RuPaul's Drag Race: Untucked	Season 15 contestants	

=== Web series ===
Year	Title	Role	Notes	Ref
2023	Meet the Queens	Themselves	Stand-alone special RuPaul's Drag Race Season 15	
2023	EW News Flash	Themselves	Guest	
2023	BuzzFeed Celeb	Themselves	Guest	
2023	MTV News	Themselves	Guest	
2023	Today with Hoda and Jenna	Themselves	Guest	
2023	Drip or Drop	Themselves	Guest	
2023	Whatcha Packin’	Themselves	Guest	
2023	Squirrel Friends	Themselves	Guest; Podcast	
2023	The Pit Stop	Themselves	Guest	
2023	Expensive Taste Test	Themselves	Guest	

=== Music videos ===
Year	Title	Artist	Ref.
2023	"True Colors"	Kylie Sonique Love	
2023	"BRAT"	Chrissy Chlapecka	

== Discography ==
=== Spice's extended plays ===
Title	Details
Hot and Bored	Released: October 10, 2025; Self-released; Formats: digital download, streaming

=== Spice's singles ===
Title	Year	EP	Ref
"One Night Only" (as part of RuPaul's Drag Race season 15)	2023	Non-EP singles	
"Golden Years (Rockin' Old Gs)" (as part of RuPaul's Drag Race season 15)	2023	Non-EP singles	
"Dingaling"	2023	Non-EP singles	
"Ur Not Hot"	2024	Hot and Bored	
"Bored Asf" (with 6arelyhuman)	2024	Hot and Bored	
"Living Art" (with Hyra)	2025	Hot and Bored	
"Infinite Abyss"	2025	Hot and Bored	
"Midnight Dance"	2026	TBA	
"Limitless"	2026	TBA	
"Party Like It's 2010"	2026	TBA	

=== Sugar's singles ===
Title	Year	Album	Ref
"Bimbofied"	2023	Non-album single	

=== Spice and Sugar collaboration ===
Title	Year	EP	Ref
"All Dolled Up!"	2024	Hot and Bored	

== See also ==
- List of Long Islanders
