= F Bar =

Defunct gay bar and nightclub in Houston, Texas, U.S.

- Interactive map of F Bar
- Address: 202 Tuam Street; Houston, Texas; United States
- Coordinates: 29.747635831852037°N 95.3822593405944°W

Construction
- Opened: 2011
- Closed: 2017

Website
- web.archive.org/*/https://www.fbarhouston.com

F Bar was a gay bar and nightclub in Midtown, Houston, in the U.S. state of Texas. The bar opened in 2011 and closed in 2017. Garth Mueller of Frommer's rated the bar 1 out of 3 stars.

F Bar had taken customers from the JR's Bar and Grill/South Beach Houston/Montrose Mining Company/Meteor bar family, and the latter business family banned employees who began working at F Bar from patronizing JR/South Beach/Meteor. After the JR's business family enacted a fee on the shuttle between Meteor and the other bars, F Bar began compensating for the shuttle fee.
