= List of Quibi original programming =

Quibi was an over-the-top American short-form streaming platform that generated content for viewing on mobile devices. To capitalize on mobile viewing specifically, Quibi provided "quick bites" of content that can be viewed in under 10 minutes, and the content utilized "Turnstyle" technology in order to dynamically switch between portrait and landscape viewing formats. The platform was only operational for six months, from April 6 to December 1, 2020. After shutdown Quibi's entire library of programming, including those that were not released yet, were acquired by Roku for The Roku Channel.

== Content ==
Quibi's content fell into three main categories:

- Movies in Chapters: Longer features broken into chapters of 5–10 minutes
- Unscripted and Docs: Shows that are episodic in nature and are 10 minutes or less
- Daily Essentials: Daily curated quick bites of news, entertainment, and inspiration in the 5–6 minute range

== Original programming ==
New episodes were released every weekday unless stated otherwise.

=== Drama ===
Title	Genre	Premiere	Seasons	Status
Most Dangerous Game	Action thriller	April 6, 2020	1 season, 15 episodes	Ended; Moved to The Roku Channel
Survive	Thriller	April 6, 2020	12 episodes	Ended; Miniseries
When the Streetlights Go On	Drama	April 6, 2020	1 season, 10 episodes	Ended; Miniseries
50 States of Fright	Horror anthology	April 13, 2020; April 6, 2020 (early access)	2 seasons, 24 episodes	Ended
#FreeRayshawn	Crime drama	April 13, 2020	1 season, 15 episodes	Ended; Miniseries
The Stranger	Psychological thriller	April 13, 2020	13 episodes	Ended; Moved to Hulu as a feature film
Don't Look Deeper	Science fiction drama	July 27, 2020	1 season, 14 episodes	Ended
The Fugitive	Action thriller	August 3, 2020	1 season, 14 episodes	Ended; Miniseries
Wireless	Thriller	September 13, 2020	1 season, 10 episodes	Ended
The Expecting	Horror	October 5, 2020	1 season, 11 episodes	Ended

=== Comedy ===
Title	Genre	Premiere	Seasons	Status
Flipped	Comedy	April 6, 2020	1 season, 11 episodes	Ended
Agua Donkeys	Comedy	April 13, 2020	1 season, 10 episodes	Ended
Dummy	Comedy	April 20, 2020	1 season, 10 episodes	Ended
Royalties	Musical comedy	May 31, 2020	1 season, 10 episodes	Ended
Home Movie: The Princess Bride	Comedy	June 29, 2020	10 episodes	Miniseries
Die Hart	Comedy	July 20, 2020	1 season, 10 episodes	Ended; Moved to The Roku Channel
Mapleworth Murders	Mystery comedy	August 10, 2020	1 season, 12 episodes	Ended; Moved to The Roku Channel

=== Unscripted ===
==== Docuseries ====
Title	Genre	Premiere	Seasons	Status
&Music	Music	April 6, 2020	1 season, 6 episodes	Ended
Fierce Queens	Animals	April 6, 2020	1 season, 7 episodes	Ended
I Promise	Docuseries	April 6, 2020	1 season, 15 episodes	Ended
NightGowns	Docuseries	April 6, 2020	1 season, 8 episodes	Ended
Nikki Fre$h	Docu-comedy	April 6, 2020	1 season, 6 episodes	Ended
Prodigy	Sports	April 6, 2020	1 season, 8 episodes	Ended
Run This City	Biography/Politics	April 6, 2020	10 episodes	Miniseries
Shape of Pasta	Food	April 6, 2020	8 episodes	Miniseries
You Ain't Got These	Sneaker culture	April 6, 2020	1 season, 12 episodes	Ended
Blackballed	Sports	May 18, 2020	1 season, 12 episodes	Ended
Kirby Jenner	Docu-comedy	May 24, 2020	1 season, 8 episodes	Ended
The Andy Cohen Diaries	Animated docuseries	July 20, 2020	1 season, 6 episodes	Ended
Sex Next Door	Docuseries	August 3, 2020	1 season, 8 episodes	Ended
About Face	Beauty	August 10, 2020	1 season, 6 episodes	Ended
Benedict Men	Sports	September 19, 2020	1 season, 12 episodes	Ended
Last Looks	True crime/Fashion	October 12, 2020	1 season, 18 episodes	Ended
Big Rad Wolf	Fashion	October 19, 2020	1 season, 9 episodes	Ended
Murder Unboxed	True crime	October 19, 2020	1 season, 8 episodes	Ended
Slugfest: Inside the Epic, 50-Year Battle Between Marvel and DC	Comics	November 9, 2020	1 season, 10 episodes	Ended
Ten Weeks	Military	November 9, 2020	1 season, 10 episodes	Ended; Remaining episodes released on The Roku Channel

==== Reality ====
Title	Genre	Premiere	Seasons	Status
Chrissy's Court	Arbitration court show	April 6, 2020	3 seasons, 32 episodes	Ended; Season 3 moved to The Roku Channel
Dishmantled	Cooking competition	April 6, 2020	1 season, 10 episodes	Ended; Moved to The Roku Channel
Gayme Show	Game show	April 6, 2020	1 season, 8 episodes	Ended
Gone Mental with Lior	Mentalism	April 6, 2020	1 season, 8 episodes	Ended
Memory Hole	Clip show	April 6, 2020	1 season, 7 episodes	Ended
Murder House Flip	Home makeover/True crime	April 6, 2020	1 season, 12 episodes	Ended; Moved to The Roku Channel
Punk'd	Prank show	April 6, 2020	2 seasons, 20 episodes	Ended; Remaining Season 2 released on The Roku Channel
The Sauce	Dance competition	April 6, 2020	1 season, 7 episodes	Ended
Singled Out	Dating game show	April 6, 2020	2 seasons, 20 episodes	Ended
Skrrt With Offset	Car show	April 6, 2020	1 season, 8 episodes	Ended
Thanks a Million	Giving show	April 6, 2020	1 season, 10 episodes	Ended; Season 2 moved to The Roku Channel
Elba vs. Block	Competition	April 13, 2020	1 season, 8 episodes	Ended
Fight Like A Girl	Reality	April 13, 2020	1 season, 10 episodes	Ended
Let's Roll with Tony Greenhand	Reality	April 13, 2020	1 season, 5 episodes	Ended
Iron Sharpens Iron	Sports	April 20, 2020	1 season, 8 episodes	Ended
Cup of Joe	Travel show	April 27, 2020	1 season, 8 episodes	Ended
Floored	Dance competition	April 27, 2020	1 season, 12 episodes	Ended
Useless Celebrity History	Flashback	May 4, 2020	1 season, 8 episodes	Ended
Barkitecture	Reality	May 11, 2020	1 season, 8 episodes	Ended
Centerpiece	Reality	May 18, 2020	1 season, 7 episodes	Ended
Life-Size Toys	Stunt show	July 6, 2020	1 season, 8 episodes	Ended
Bad Ideas with Adam Devine	Reality	July 27, 2020	1 season, 7 episodes	Ended
Nice One!	Game show	August 24, 2020	1 season, 8 episodes	Ended
This Joka with Will Smith	Stand-up comedy	November 23, 2020	1 season, 16 episodes	Ended

=== Continuations ===
Title	Genre	Prev. network(s)	Premiere	Seasons	Status
Reno 911! (season 7)	Comedy	Comedy Central	May 4, 2020	1 season, 25 episodes	Ended; Season 8 moved to The Roku Channel as Reno 911! Defunded

=== Daily Essentials ===
==== Lifestyle ====
Title	Genre	Premiere
All the Feels by The Dodo	Animals	April 6, 2020
The Daily Chill	Meditation	April 6, 2020
Last Night's Late Night by EW (Note: Episodes only available for three days)	Entertainment	April 6, 2020
The Nod with Brittany & Eric	Culture	April 6, 2020
The Rachel Hollis Show	Well-being	April 6, 2020
The Rotten Tomatoes Watch List (Note: Episodes only available for a week)	Entertainment	April 6, 2020
Sexology with Shan Boodram	Intimacy	April 6, 2020
Theatrical Trailers by Fandango	Trailers	April 6, 2020
TV + Streaming Trailers by Fandango	Trailers	April 6, 2020
Your Daily Horoscope	Horoscopes	July 6, 2020
Athletes After Hours by TMZ	Celebrity culture	September 28, 2020

==== News ====
Title	Genre	Premiere
Speedrun by Polygon	Video games	April 6, 2020
Around the World by BBC News	News	April 6, 2020
Close Up by E! News	Entertainment	April 6, 2020
For the Cultura by Telemundo	Pop culture	April 6, 2020
NewsDay and NewsNight by CTV News (Note: Only available in Canada)	News	April 6, 2020
No Filter by TMZ	Entertainment	April 6, 2020
Pulso News by Telemundo	News	April 6, 2020
The Replay by ESPN (Note: Only latest episode available)	Sports	April 6, 2020
The Report by NBC News	News	April 6, 2020
Sports AM by TSN	Sports	April 6, 2020
Weather Today by The Weather Channel	Weather	April 6, 2020
Answered by Vox	News	April 20, 2020
60 in 6 by CBS News	News	June 14, 2020
Musicology with Tim Kash	Music	June 17, 2020
Hello America	Satirical comedy/News	July 6, 2020

== Original films ==
=== Documentaries ===
Title	Release	Length	Language
Formally announced release
Crescendo	December 7, 2020	10 min.	English

== Former upcoming original programming ==
=== Drama ===
Title	Genre	Status
Aftermath	Horror	TBA
Charlemagne	Historical drama	TBA
Crazy Talented		TBA
CURS_R		TBA
Ice Cream Man	Horror anthology	TBA
The Last American Vampire		TBA
Spielberg's After Dark	Horror	Moving to The Roku Channel
Swimming with Sharks	Thriller	Moved to The Roku Channel
Tomie	Dark Comedy/Horror	TBA
Toys	Thriller	TBA
Transmissions	Thriller	TBA
Wolves and Villagers	Thriller	TBA
Untitled Code 8 spinoff	Science fiction	TBA
Untitled Dexter Fletcher series		TBA
Untitled Ice Cube heist series	Heist	TBA

=== Comedy ===
Title	Genre	Status
Black Coffee		TBA
Dead Spots		TBA
Bill Burr Presents Immoral Compass	Sketch comedy	Moved to The Roku Channel
How to Lose a Guy in 10 Days	Romantic comedy	TBA
Junior High		TBA
Just One Drink		TBA
Last Resort		TBA
Les Grossman		TBA
The Monarchy is Going to Shit		TBA
The Now	Black comedy	Moved to The Roku Channel
Public Figures	Dramedy	Moved to HBO Max
Ten Ton Chum		TBA
Trip	Romantic comedy	TBA
Unmatched		TBA
Varsity Blues	Sports comedy-drama	TBA
Winos		TBA

=== Animation ===
==== Adult animation ====
Title	Genre	Status
Doomlands	Science fiction animated sitcom	Moved to The Roku Channel
Gloop World	Stop motion comedy	TBA
Filthy Animals	Stop motion	TBA
Futha Mucka	Comedy	TBA
Micro Mayhem	Stop motion	TBA
Trill League	Superhero	TBA

=== Non-English language scripted ===
Title	Genre	Language	Status
Natural Born Narco	Telenovela	Spanish	Moved to The Roku Channel

=== Unscripted ===
==== Docuseries ====
Title	Genre	Status
Beauty	Docuseries	TBA
Canceled	Docuseries	TBA
Empires of Luxury	Docuseries	TBA
High & Low	Comedy/Travel	TBA
Untitled Justin Timberlake project	Docuseries	TBA
Untitled Scooter Braun tattoo series	Docuseries	TBA
What Happens in Hollywood	Docuseries	Moved to The Roku Channel

==== Reality ====
Title	Genre	Status
Biggest Little Cook-Off	Cooking competition	TBA
Eye Candy	Game show	Moved to The Roku Channel
Killing Zac Efron	Reality	Unaired
Legends of the Hidden Temple	Game show	Moved to The CW
Let's Go Atsuko!	Game show	TBA
Pranks	Prank show	TBA
Rapper Warrior Ninja	Game show	TBA
Squeaky Clean	Competition	Moved to The Roku Channel
The Hot Drop	Dating game show	TBA
Untitled Scooter Braun dance competition	Dance competition	TBA

==== Variety ====
Title	Genre	Status
Pillow Talk with Demi Lovato	Talk show	Moved to The Roku Channel as The Demi Lovato Show
Potty Talk	Talk show	TBA

=== Continuations ===
Title	Genre	Prev. network(s)	Status
Alternatino with Arturo Castro (season 2)	Sketch show	Comedy Central	TBA

=== Daily Essentials ===
==== Lifestyle ====
Title	Genre	Status
Fashion's a Drag	Fashion	TBA
Hot off the Mic	Stand-up comedy	TBA

==== News ====
Title	Genre	Status
The Drop	Music	TBA
