= Meteor (bar) =

Defunct gay bar and nightclub in Houston, Texas, U.S.

- Location within Texas
- Address: 2306 Genessee Street
- Location: Houston, Texas
- Coordinates: 29.748596°N 95.384236°W
- Type: Bar
- Event: Gay bar

Website
- meteorhouston.com

Meteor, also known as Meteor Houston, Meteor Nightclub, or Meteor Urban Video Lounge, was a gay bar and nightclub in Neartown, Houston, Texas, in the United States. The bar hosted an annual Mr. Gay Pride Houston competition.

Charles Armstrong acquired Meteor in 2004.

Meteor was connected to other bars owned by the same group via a shuttle: JR's Bar and Grill, Montrose Mining Company, and South Beach Houston. Initially the shuttle was free, but during competition with F Bar the shuttle was given a $3 charge which would be compensated by the sister bars; this was to encourage people taking the shuttle to go to the JR's family of bars instead of to F Bar, as some patrons of the shuttle had done. F Bar later began compensating the $3 charges.

Meteor closed in 2016.
