= Blame It on the Edit =

- RuPaul's Drag Race episode
- Scene from the episode of the final four contestants rehearsing with a choreographer for an outer space-themed music video
- Episode no.: Season 15; Episode 14
- Presented by: RuPaul
- Original air date: March 31, 2023

Guest appearance
- Miguel Zarate

Episode chronology
| ← Previous "Teacher Makeovers" | Next → "Reunited!" |
- RuPaul's Drag Race season 15

"Blame It on the Edit" is the fourteenth episode of the fifteenth season of the American television series RuPaul's Drag Race. It originally aired on March 31, 2023. The episode's main challenge tasks the contestants with performing in an outer space-themed music video for RuPaul's song "Blame It on the Edit". Sasha Colby wins the main challenge. Anetra and Mistress Isabelle Brooks place in the bottom and face off in a lip-sync contest to "When Love Takes Over" by David Guetta featuring Kelly Rowland, but neither contestant is eliminated from the competition. The episode was nominated in the Outstanding Production Design for a Variety or Reality Series category at the 75th Primetime Creative Arts Emmy Awards.

== Episode ==
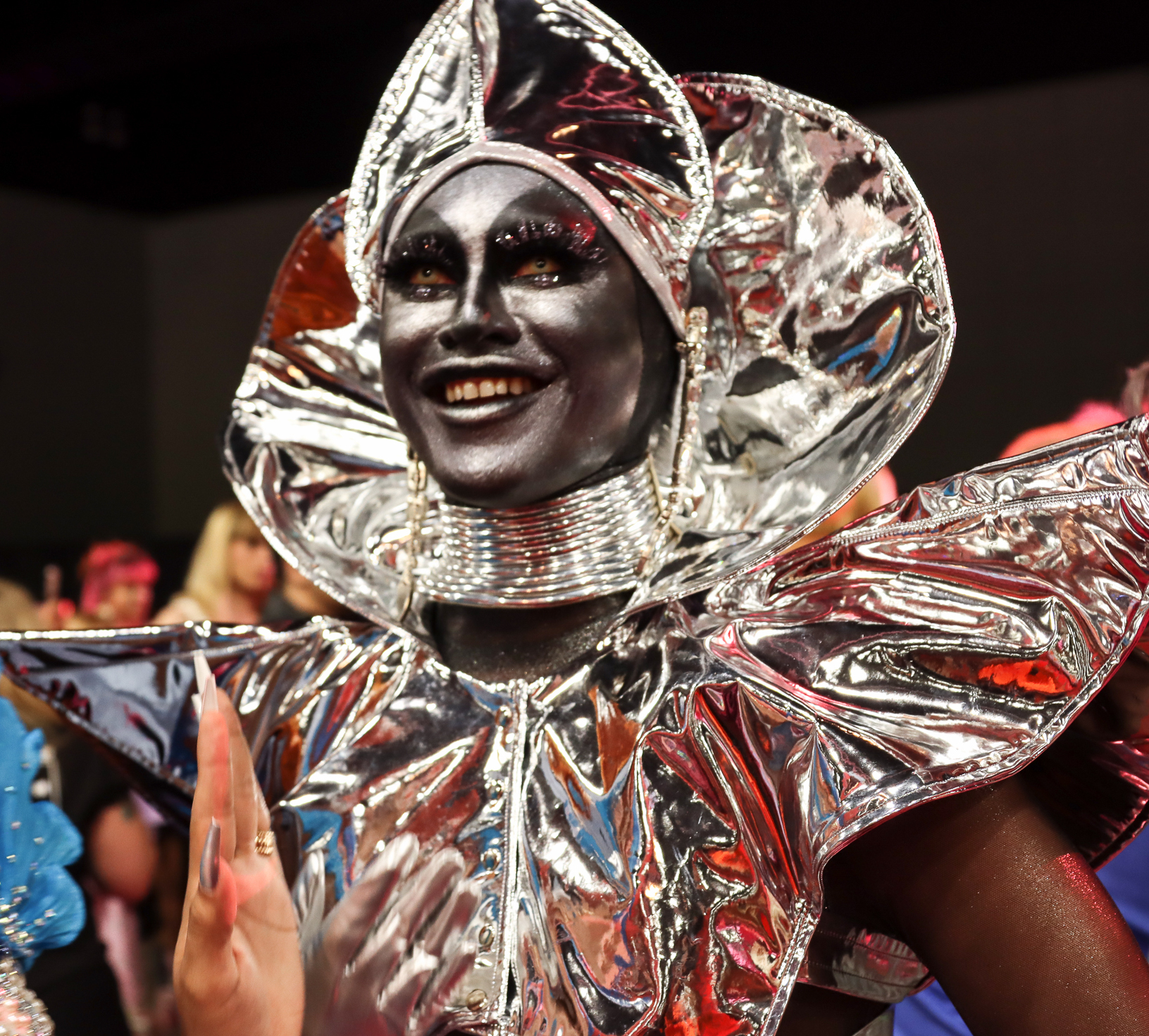
Sasha Colby (pictured at RuPaul's DragCon LA in 2023) wins the episode's main challenge.

The contestants return to the Werk Room after Loosey LaDuca's elimination on the previous episode. On a new day, RuPaul greets the group and introduces the main challenge, which tasks the contestants with performing in an outer space-themed music video to a remix of RuPaul's song "Blame It on the Edit", a song from RuPaul's fourteenth studio album Mamaru (2022). In addition to writing and recording original verses, the contestants must learn choreography by Miguel Zarate. The contestants start to write their verses in the Werk Room, then have individual Tic Tac lunches with RuPaul and Michelle Visage. Sasha Colby talks about her relationship with her mother and the suicide of her father. Anetra discusses her Mormon upbringing. Visage says Anetra's lip-sync against Marcia Marcia Marcia is her favorite. Mistress Isabelle Brooks talks about her outgoing personality and her experience in the competition. Luxx Noir London discusses her family life.

The contestants rehearse with Zarate, then film the music video with Visage as a director as well as backup dancers. On elimination day, the contestants make final preparations in the Werk Room for the fashion show. They talk about their first impressions of each other, as well as some of their favorite moments of the season. On the main stage, RuPaul welcomes fellow judges Visage and Ross Mathews. RuPaul reveals the runway category ("Drag Excellence"), then the fashion show commences. The judges and contestants watch the music video. The judges deliver their critiques, then RuPaul asks the contestants to offer words of advice to younger versions of themselves. The judges deliberate, then share the results with the group. Sasha Colby is declared the winner of the challenge. Luxx Noir London is deemed safe, placing Anetra and Mistress Isabelle Brooks in the bottom. The two face off in a lip-sync contest to "When Love Takes Over" (2009) by David Guetta featuring Kelly Rowland, but RuPaul chooses not to eliminate either from the competition.

== Production and broadcast ==
The episode originally aired on March 31, 2023.

=== Fashion ===
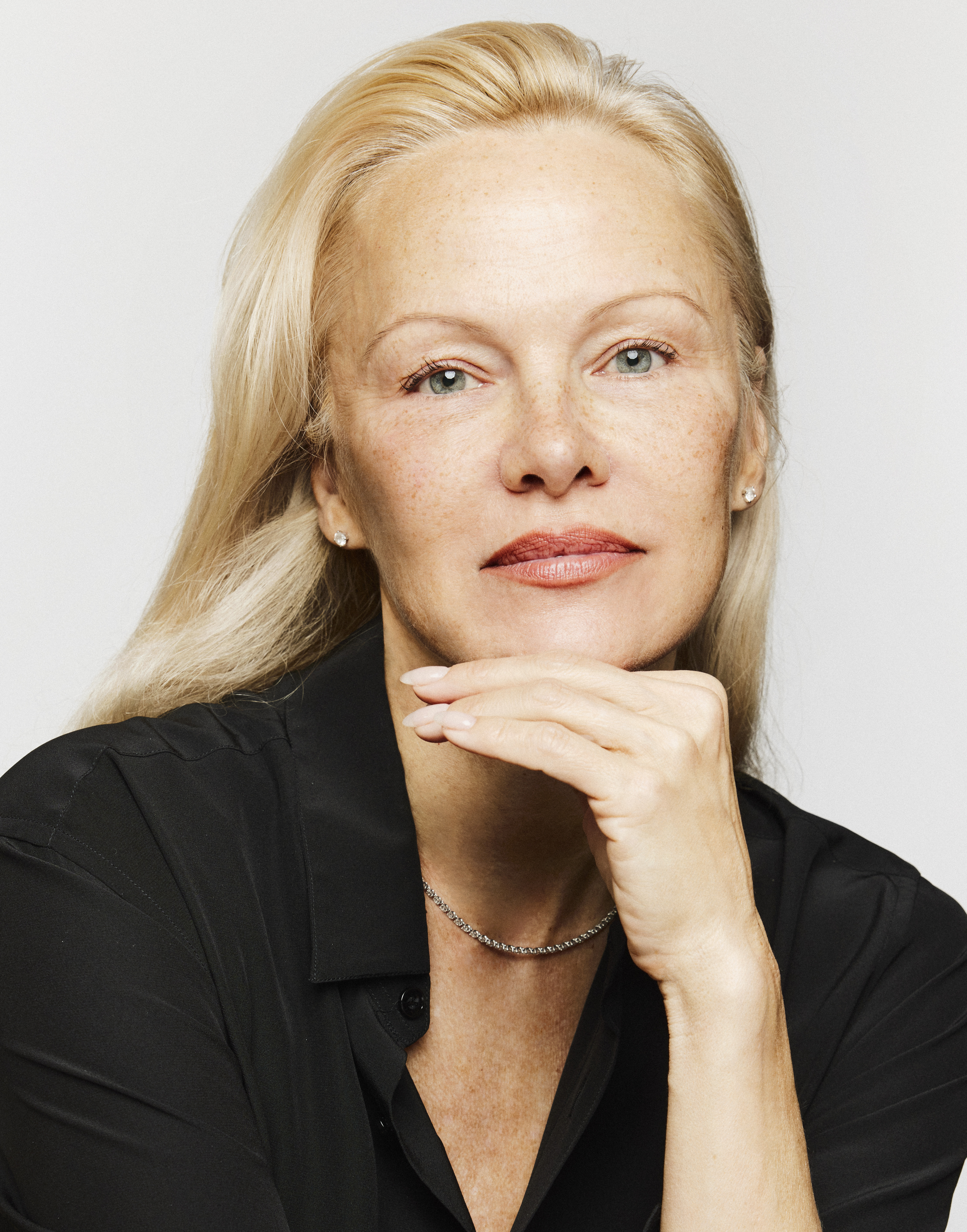
For the music video, Sasha Colby's look is inspired by actress and model Pamela Anderson (pictured in 2024).

For the music video's scenes with choreography, Anetra wears a red outfit and a red wig. Luxx Noir London has a black outfit, white boots, and a dark wig. Mistress Isabelle Brooks wears a black-and-purple bodysuit. Sasha Colby wears a black outfit inspired by Pamela Anderson in the 1996 film Barb Wire, with matching boots and a blonde wig. In other scenes shown in the final cut, Anetra and Sasha Colby both wear headpieces and RuPaul has a blonde wig.

For the main stage, RuPaul wears a pink dress and a blonde wig.

For the fashion show, Anetra wears a blue-and-silver outfit with blue jewelry and a white wig. Luxx Noir London has a white dress with large earrings and a large wig. Sasha Colby has a rhinestoned dress and a headpiece with orchids. Mistress Isabelle Brooks has a beaded gown with a cheetah print.

== Reception ==
Trae DeLellis of The A.V. Club gave the episode a rating a 'B'. Charlie Duncan of PinkNews opined, "The verses are surprisingly original for the umpteenth cast version of a Ru song in the past few years, and though an otherwise frontrunner stumbles in her offering, the music video is sickening." Stephen Daw ranked the "When Love Takes Over" performance fifteenth in Billboard's 2023 list of the season's lip-sync contests. Daw wrote: "The final showdown ahead of the season 15 finale was another bit of proof that dancing and stunts are not what makes a good lip sync performance. For the majority of this head-to-head, both Anetra and Mistress Isabelle Brooks remained in their respective spots on the stage, choosing to let their faces do the performing. Sure, we still got some duck-walking from Anetra and some speedbag punches from Mistress, but this lip-sync was sold by the passion in both queens' faces throughout."

The episode earned production designer Gianna Costa a nomination in the Outstanding Production Design for a Variety or Reality Series category at the 75th Primetime Creative Arts Emmy Awards. It was earned Costa a nomination in the Variety of Reality Series category at the Art Directors Guild's 28th annual Excellence in Production Design Awards.
