= Mistress Isabelle Brooks =

American drag performer

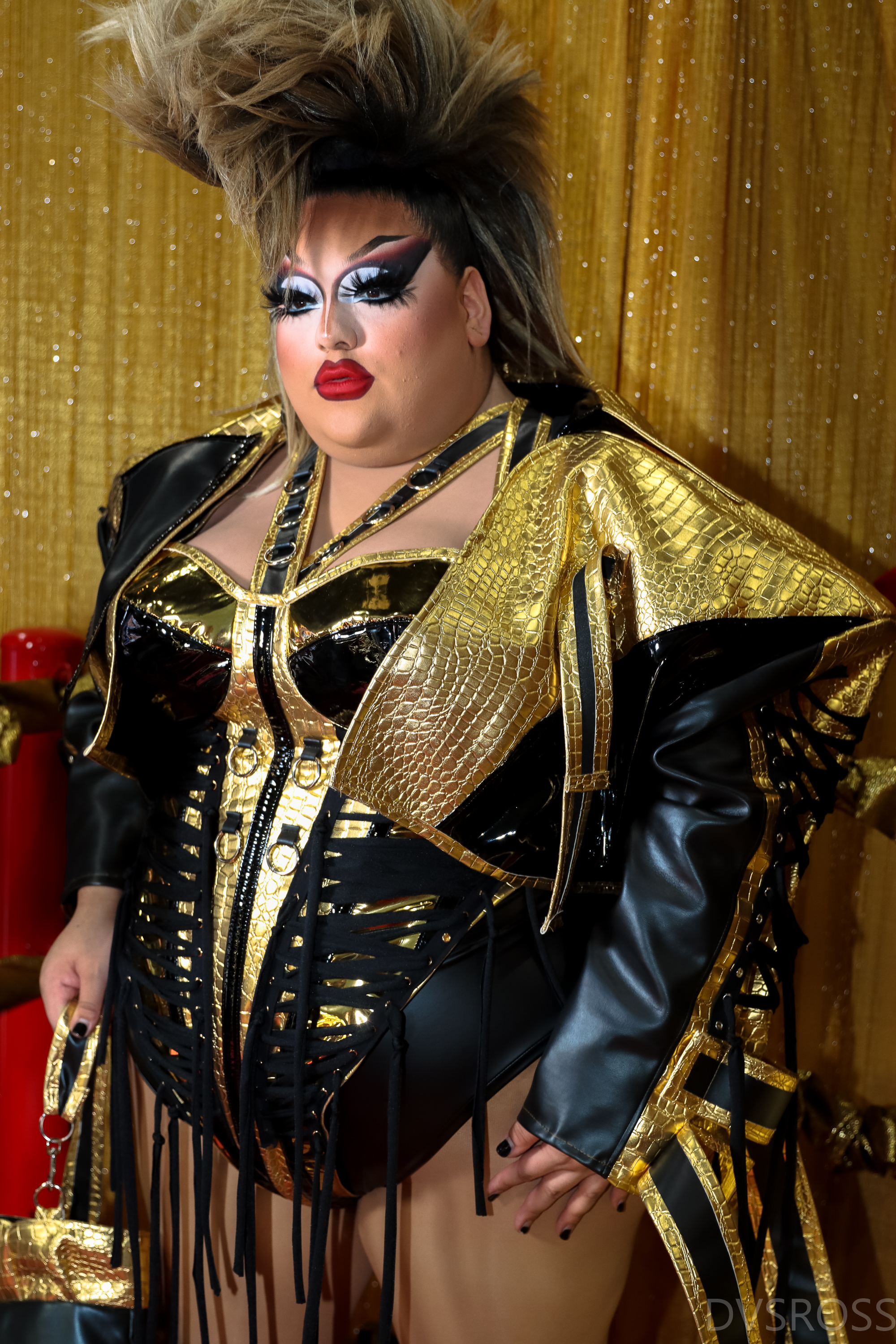
- Mistress Isabelle Brooks at RuPaul's DragCon LA, 2023
- Born: Israel; July 14, 1998 (age 28); Houston, Texas, U.S.
- Occupation: Drag queen
- Television: RuPaul's Drag Race (season 15); RuPaul's Drag Race All Stars (season 10)
- Website: mistressisabelle.com

Mistress Isabelle Brooks (real first name Israel; born July 14, 1998) is an American drag queen who competed on the fifteenth season of the television show RuPaul's Drag Race and the tenth season of RuPaul's Drag Race All Stars. Born and raised in Houston, Texas, she started doing drag as a teenager and later performed at Hamburger Mary's, JR's Bar and Grill, and South Beach prior to competing on Drag Race. In 2023, Mistress Isabelle Brooks was added to the lineup of the touring drag show Werq the World.

== Early life ==
Mistress Isabelle Brooks was born and raised in Houston, Texas. She discovered drag at around age 14, when she saw GIFs referencing the fourth season of RuPaul's Drag Race on social-media platform Tumblr and friends recommended the show. She started doing drag at age 16, and she concurrently attended high school and cosmetology school.

== Career ==
By the time she was 18 years old, Mistress Isabelle Brooks was performing in drag professionally. In Houston, she was an original cast member at the drag-themed restaurant chain Hamburger Mary's, and has regularly performed at JR's Bar and Grill, where she hosted weekly Drag Race viewing parties, and the nightclub South Beach.

In December 2019, Mistress Isabelle Brooks broke her ankle and due to the COVID-19 pandemic, was forced to rely on wig-styling for income. She has said: "I started hustling and pushing out wigs to queens all over the world. It truly feels like overnight my business skyrocketed, and weirdly enough, one of the darkest moments in my life brought me to exactly where I was supposed to be."

=== RuPaul's Drag Race ===
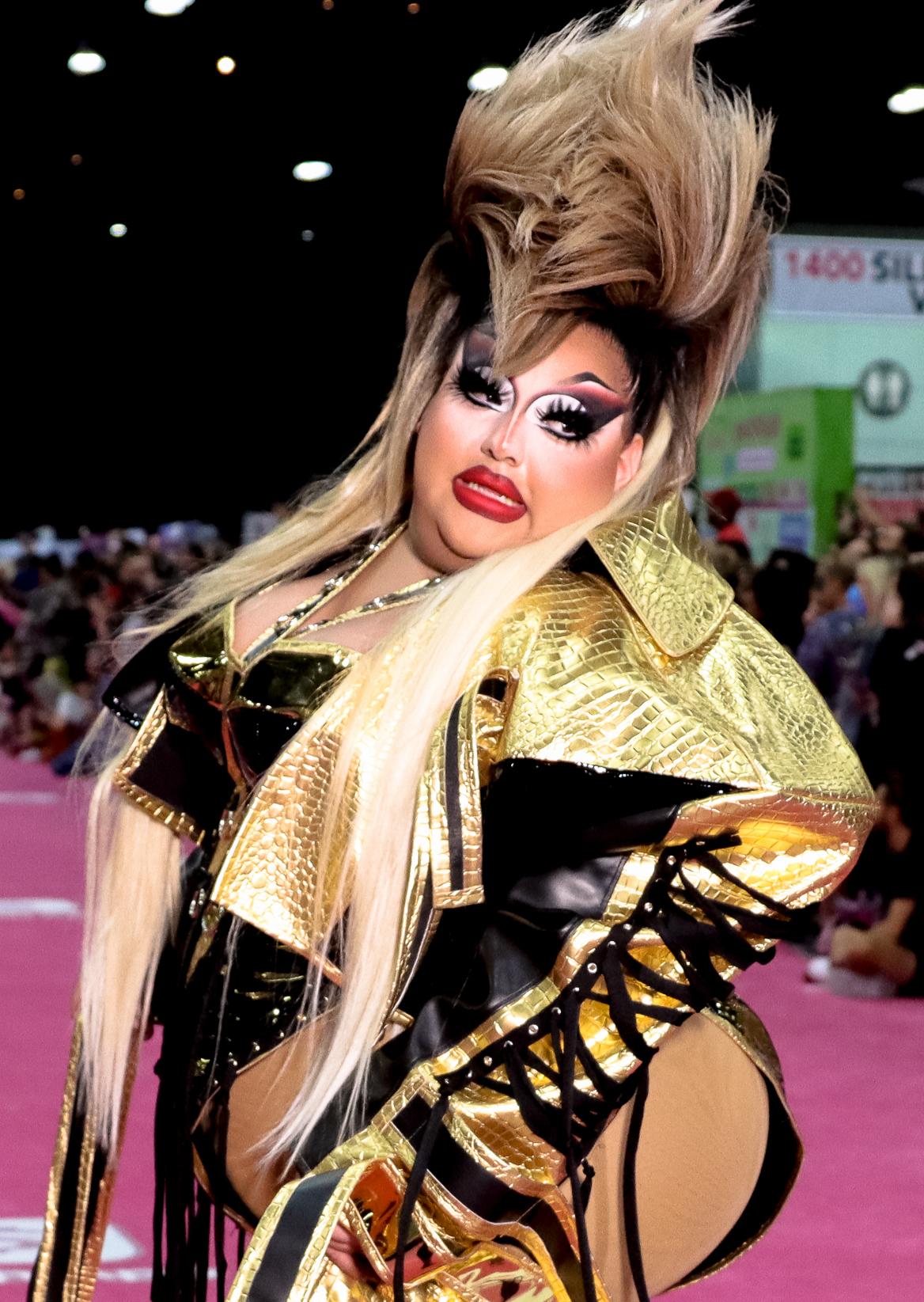
Mistress Isabelle Brooks at RuPaul's DragCon LA in 2023

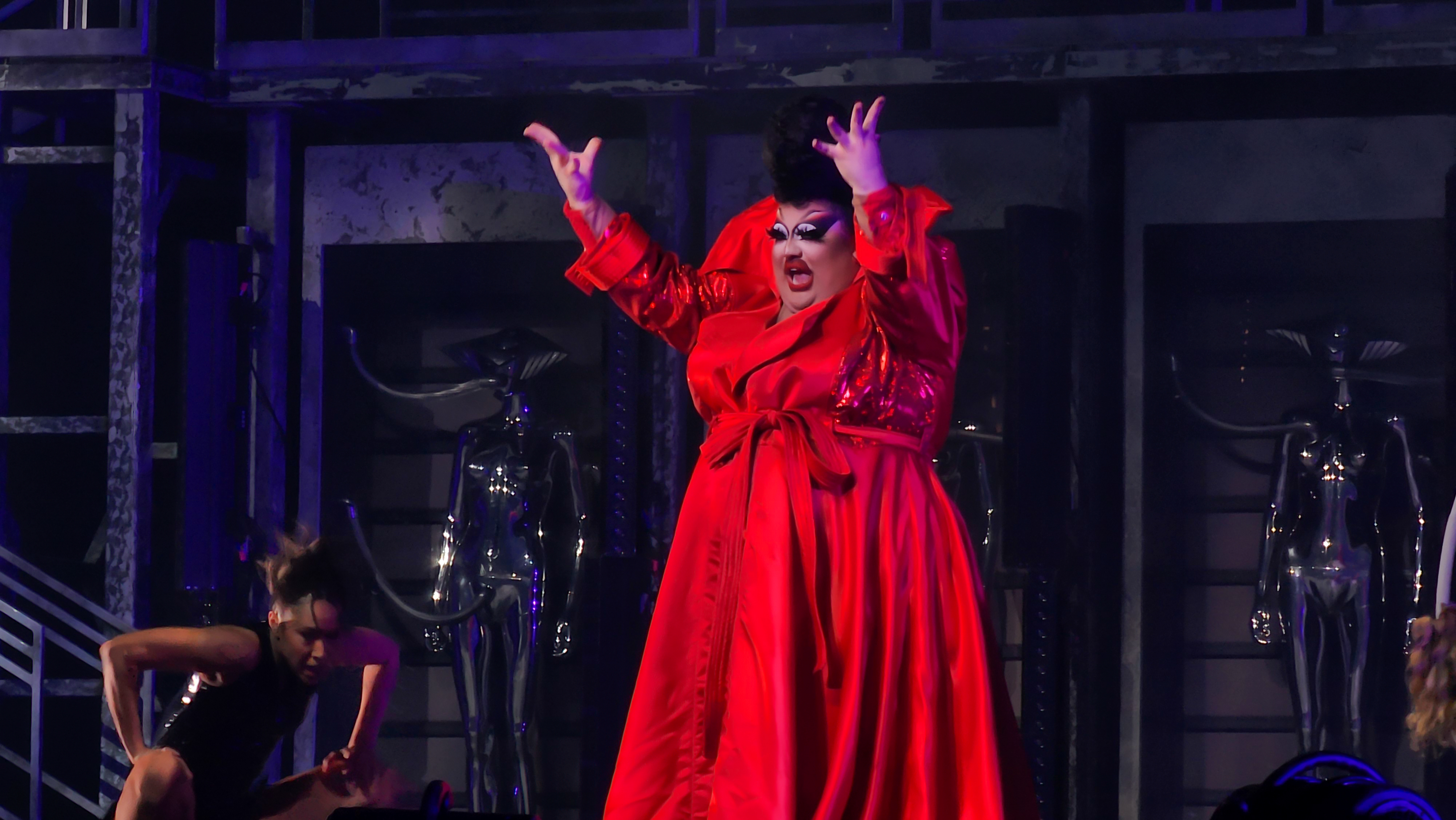
Mistress Isabelle Brooks performing at Caesars Windsor in 2023, as part of the Werq the World tour

Mistress Isabelle Brooks competed on the fifteenth season of Drag Race, winning one challenge and placing in the top four alongside Anetra, Luxx Noir London, and Sasha Colby. She was the first contestant on the series to represent Houston. According to Mistress Isabelle Brooks, she spent approximately $100,000 on her looks for Drag Race, including $40,000 for the final episode. Many of her looks were created by Houston designers Yahaira DeHill and Gin Martini.

For the Snatch Game challenge, Mistress Isabelle Brooks impersonated comedian Rosie O'Donnell; Joey Nolfi of Entertainment Weekly said her character "seemingly unintentionally" and "self-admittedly devolved into" Abby Lee Miller. Shafaq Patel of Axios complimented Mistress Isabelle Brooks's performance of "Big Girl!" and said she "served Southern sass and her looks were stunning". Sam Byrd of OutSmart called her a "plus-sized diva with a plus-sized attitude to match" who is "not afraid of a little blush and makeup to go with that head-boss stature".

Pride.com's Bernardo Sim called Mistress Isabelle Brooks "one of the funniest" contestants of the season and said she "has been an absolute standout in the cast". He wrote, "Fans have been living for her old-school attitude, impeccable makeup skills and outfits, and undeniable star power." According to Jordan Robledo of Gay Times, Mistress Isabelle Brooks was "inundated with hateful messages targeting her appearance and interactions with her fellow contestants" as the show aired. Her Instagram account was suspended multiple times. Charlie Duncan of PinkNews said Mistress Isabelle Brooks "delivered a blistering takedown to online trolls spreading anti-drag hate". The website's Marcus Wratten described her as the "shadiest" contestant of season 15.

In 2023, Mistress Isabelle Brooks was added to the lineup of drag-show tour Werq the World's shows in North America.

On April 23, 2025, Mistress Isabelle Brooks was announced as one of eighteen former Drag Race contestants participating in the tenth season of RuPaul's Drag Race All Stars.

== Personal life ==
Mistress Isabelle Brooks is Mexican American and bisexual. She uses the pronouns he/him/his out of drag and she/her/hers in drag. Mistress Isabelle Brooks has described her drag as "big, beautiful and glamorous", and as "over-the-top traditional drag with a modern twist". She also called herself the "heavyweight champ" of season 15. Mistress Isabelle Brooks "adopted" fellow contestants Sugar and Spice as her "drag daughters".

== Discography ==
=== As a featured artist ===
Title	Year	Album	Ref.
"One Night Only" (with the cast of RuPaul's Drag Race, season 15)	2023	—N/a	
"Golden Girlfriends (Banjo Bitches)" (with Marcia Marcia Marcia, Luxx Noir London, and Salina EsTitties)	2023	—N/a	
"Wigloose: The Rusical!" (with the cast of RuPaul's Drag Race, season 15)	2023	Wigloose: The Rusical! Album	
"Blame It on the Edit" (RuPaul ft. Anetra, Luxx Noir London, and Sasha Colby)	2023	—N/a	
"Delusion"	2023	—N/a	

== Filmography ==
=== Television ===
List of television credits
Year	Title	Role	Notes	Ref.
2023	RuPaul's Drag Race (season 15)	Herself / Contestant	3rd/4th place	
2023	RuPaul's Drag Race: Untucked	Herself / Contestant	3rd/4th place	
2025	RuPaul's Drag Race (season 17)	Herself	Special guest; Episode: "The Villains Roast"	
2025	RuPaul's Drag Race All Stars (season 10)	Herself / Contestant	9th place	

=== Web series ===
List of web series credits
Year	Title	Role	Notes	Ref.
2023	Meet the Queens	Herself	Stand-alone special RuPaul's Drag Race (season 15)	
2023	EW News Flash	Herself	Guest	
2023	BuzzFeed Celeb	Herself	Guest	
2023	MTV News	Herself	Guest	
2023	Today with Hoda and Jenna	Herself	Guest	
2023	Drip or Drop	Herself	Guest	
2023	Whatcha Packin'	Herself	Guest	
2023	Give It to Me Straight	Herself	Guest	
2023	The Pit Stop	Herself	Guest	

=== Music videos ===
Year	Title	Artist	Ref.
2023	"Blame It on the Edit"	RuPaul ft. Luxx Noir London, Sasha Colby & Anetra	

== See also ==
- List of people from Houston
