= Sasha Colby =

American drag performer (born 1984)

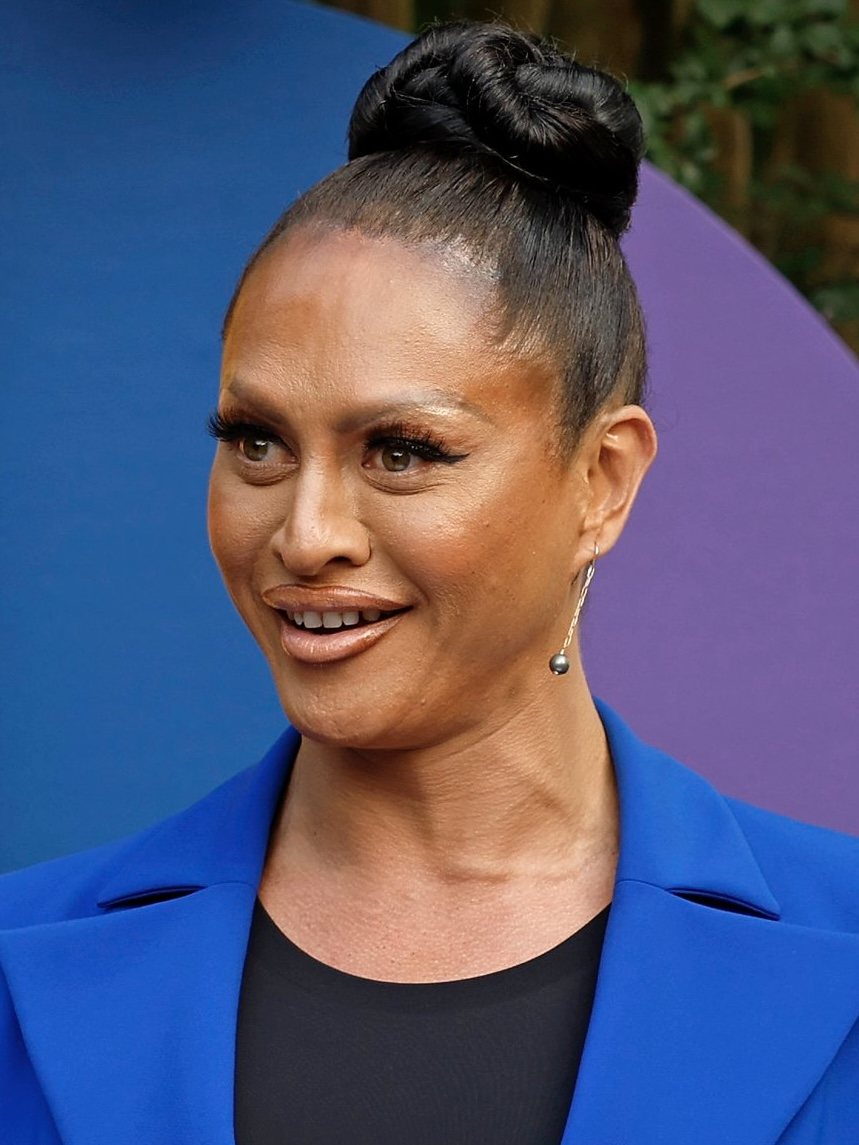
- Sasha Colby in 2023
- Born: July 26, 1984 (age 42); Waimānalo, Hawaii, U.S.
- Other name: Sasha Kekauoha
- Education: Kailua High School
- Occupation: Drag queen
- Years active: 2001–present
- Television: RuPaul's Drag Race (season 15)
- Website: sashacolby.net

Sasha Kekauoha (born July 26, 1984), best known by the stage name Sasha Colby, is an American drag performer and beauty pageant competitor. Often referred to as a legendary figure in drag culture, she won the Miss Continental competition in 2012 before going on to win the fifteenth season of RuPaul's Drag Race in 2023.

== Early life ==
Sasha Colby was born in Waimānalo, Oʻahu, Hawaii. Her father was Native Hawaiian. Her mother, who is half Hawaiian and of further Irish and German ancestry, suffered from severe bipolar disorder, resulting in a volatile upbringing. Colby is the youngest of seven children, with her siblings, three boys and three girls, all being born 3 years apart from each other except for herself, being born 13 years after her youngest sister. She was raised by a conservative, Jehovah's Witness family. Her home life was very strict, with Colby not getting to visit anyone else's house, celebrate Christmas, or celebrate birthdays growing up; she was 16 the first time she had a birthday party. She described having a "fear" of being gay while living in this religious environment before eventually leaving the church as a teenager.

Colby recognized she was a girl as early as age 5, with some of her female relatives noticing her femininity and allowing her to have "a girls experience" when playing with her. She secretly did drag during her childhood and adolescence, locking herself in the bathroom, putting on her sister's makeup and clothes, and lip syncing to songs on the radio "for hours". The first transgender woman she met was her mother's hairdresser, Tammy. As a child, she had fair skin, blonde hair, and green eyes, with these features traditionally associated with whiteness being the target of scrutiny by other children, especially through the word "haole", a Hawaiian term used for anyone who isn't of Native ancestry. She was also picked on for her feminine qualities, once describing an experience she had of a kid trying to forcefully rip out her long eyelashes at school.

Colby began formally dancing at the age of 13, taking hip-hop, jazz, and ballet classes at 24/7 Danceforce Studio in Kāneʻohe, Hawaii. She has described dance during this period of her life as a mechanism of "survival", with it, as well as the community surrounding it, allowing her to express her femininity and queerness freely when she had to repress those parts of herself in her religious household. It was also at this age that she discovered the music of Janet Jackson, particularly her 1997 album The Velvet Rope. The record's themes revolving around sexual liberation, LGBTQ+ identities, and emotional pain, along with the choreography associated with the music, helped shape her approach to performance and process her personal trauma. Other early influences of hers include Madonna, fellow Miss Continental winners Monica Munro and Chevelle Brooks, Linda Evangelista, Naomi Campbell, and her Hawaiian heritage.

She was first exposed to drag at 17 in Hawaii when her dance friends snuck her into a 18-and-older drag show at Venus, a club in Waikīkī which was hosting the 40th birthday celebration for a queen named Aiko Kenny. She stated that this show featured many transfemme drag performers, and seeing them allowed her to feel as if "it all connected in [her] head" regarding her gender identity and personal desire to perform. She would go on to transition at the age of 18. Colby also met her drag mother, Cassandra Colby, around this time, and she would be introduced to the drag pageantry circuit through her.

== Career ==
Sasha Colby graduated from high school at 17, left Hawaii and moved to Las Vegas, Nevada at 18. It was around this time that she began doing sex work for money in order to medically and cosmetically transition. Colby began professionally doing drag in Vegas, working at gay bars five nights out of the week for six months before moving back to Hawaii and being able to present herself as a fully realized transgender woman.

Colby has been described as a "beauty queen", a "drag legend", and a "pageant legend". She first competed at Miss Continental in 2005 where she placed as 4th Alternate and 5th overall, returning in 2006 in 12th place. After an taking time off from the pageant for 3 years, she returned in 2009 as 1st Runner-Up before winning in 2012. Her winning talent show number was a lip sync performance to a megamix track featuring the songs "Angels and Men" by Juno Reactor, "Drama" by Club 69 with Kim Cooper, "Royal T" by the Crookers with Róisín Murphy, "Rhythm is My Bitch" by Kevin Aviance, and "212" by Azealia Banks.

In 2018, Sasha Colby was cast in Sasha Velour's drag showcase NightGowns and appeared in the stage show's 2020 docu-series. Alongside other drag queens, Sasha Colby walked the runway before Jennifer Lopez's performance at the iHeartRadio Music Awards wearing a look inspired by Lopez. Chrissy Callahan of NBC News said Sasha Colby's look "channeled" the "Jenny from the Block" music video.

Sasha Colby is also known as a model and activist. In 2020, she represented Hawaii in GLAAD's video, which featured drag queens from all 50 states and Washington, D.C., and sought to mobilize voters in the 2020 U.S. presidential election. Before the COVID-19 pandemic, she organized a monthly trans-inclusive event at The Chapel, a gay bar in West Hollywood, California.

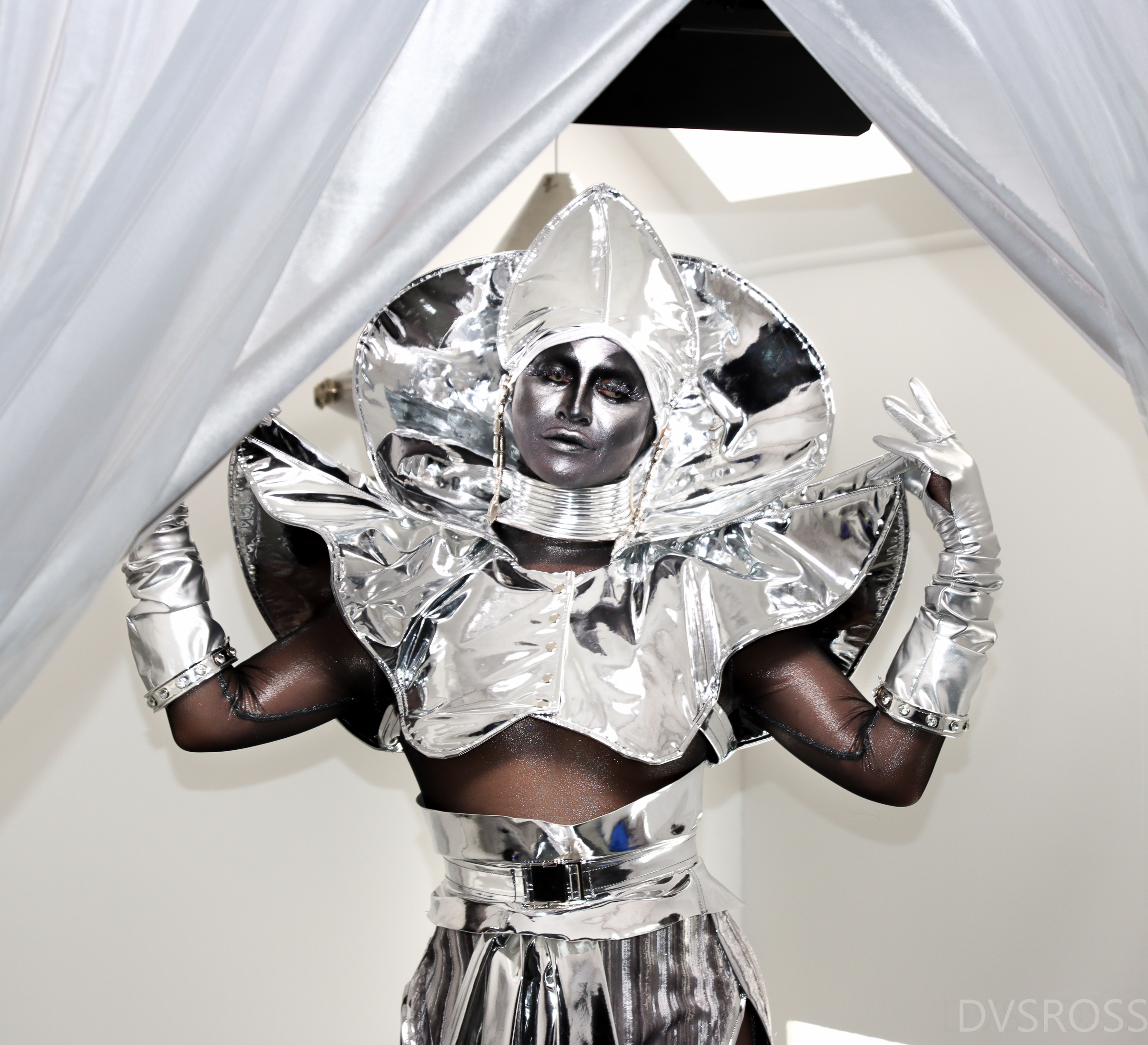
Sasha Colby at RuPaul's DragCon LA in 2023

In 2023, Sasha Colby was cast on the fifteenth season of RuPaul's Drag Race. She is the first-ever Native Hawaiian to be cast on Drag Race. She was crowned the winner of the season, earning the title of America's Next Drag Superstar and becoming the first winner of Polynesian descent. Later that year, Colby spoke at the annual Pride Month celebration hosted by Vice President Kamala Harris.

RuPaul was opposed to casting openly transgender women on the show until late 2018, despite casting closeted transgender women in previous seasons. Colby waited until she felt it was her time to audition for the show and told Vogue that winning during a year of vehement anti-transgender legislation was important to her. She is the second trans woman to win RuPaul's Drag Race (after Willow Pill) and fourth to win Drag Race globally, following Angele Anang on Drag Race Thailand (Season 2), Kylie Sonique Love on RuPaul's Drag Race All Stars (Season 6), and Vanessa Van Cartier on Drag Race Holland (Season 2), and preceding Captivating Katkat on Drag Race Philippines (Season 2). Following Van Cartier, Colby is the second Miss Continental winner to win a Drag Race season.

== Personal life ==
Sasha Colby is a trans woman. Previously based in Chicago, Illinois and Orlando, Florida, she has lived in Los Angeles since 2014. She is the drag mother of season 14 contestant Kerri Colby and singer-songwriter Chappell Roan.

Colby has Native Hawaiian and Irish heritage. While on Drag Race, Colby performed a lip-sync to "Zombie" by The Cranberries to honor her Irish heritage and the trauma of seeing the Warrington bombings on the news as a child. Additionally, the performance was a tribute to how "Zombie" helped her cope with witnessing her parents' struggles with mental illness, especially her mother who had bipolar disorder.

Colby is passionate about learning history. She is particularly inspired by the gender transition of Chevalier d'Éon during the 1700s. She is polyamorous and has three partners, including a queer gym owner based in Seattle. She was previously married to a woman around the time she won Miss Continental. Colby is an ordained minister.

In 2016, her father died by suicide just a few years before turning 80 due to the toll of her mother's bipolar disorder.

== Titles ==
- America's Next Drag Superstar, RuPaul's Drag Race Season 15, 2023, Winner
- Miss Continental 2012, Winner
- Miss Pennsylvania Premiere Continental 2012, Winner
- Miss Continental 2008, First Alternate
- Miss West Virginia Continental 2008, Winner
- Miss Continental 2005, Fourth Alternate

== Filmography ==
=== Television ===
Year	Title	Role	Notes	Ref
2018	Hawaii Five-0	Malie	Episode: "A'ohe Kio Pohaku Nalo i Ke Alo Pali"	
2022	Boss'd Up	Herself	Episode: "No I in Team"	
2023	RuPaul's Drag Race (season 15)	Herself	Winner	
2023	RuPaul's Drag Race: Untucked	Herself	Winner	
2023	The Daily Show	Herself	Guest	
2023	Soul of a Nation	Herself	Guest; Documentary series	
2023	KTLA5 News	Herself	Guest	
2024	RuPaul's Drag Race (season 16)	Herself	Special guest; Episode: "Grande Finale"	
2025	Drag Race Philippines: Slaysian Royale	Judge		

=== Web series ===
Year	Title	Notes	Ref.
2020	NightGowns	Docu-series	
2023	Meet the Queens	Stand-alone special RuPaul's Drag Race Season 15	
2023	EW News Flash	Guest	
2023	Pride Today	Guest	
2023	BuzzFeed Celeb	Guest	
2023	MTV News	Guest	
2023	Today with Hoda and Jenna	Guest	
2023	Drip or Drop	Guest	
2023	Whatcha Packin'	Guest	
2023	Logo Spill	Guest	
2023	Squirrel Friends	Guest; Podcast	
2023	Self-Care / Don't Care	Guest	
2023	Drag Makeup with Allure	Guest	
2023	Billboard Cover	Guest	
2023	Can't Cancel Pride	Guest	
2023	Shut Up Evan	Guest; Podcast	
2023	The Awardist	Guest	
2024	The Pit Stop	Guest	
2026	Royal Court	Guest	

== Discography ==
All credits adapted from Apple Music and Spotify.

=== Singles ===
==== As lead artist ====
Year	Title	Album	Writer(s)	Producer(s)
2023	"Feel the Power" (Sasha Colby with Glovibes and Luciana)	Non-album single	Leonardo Abbate, Luciana, Nick Clow, Sasha Colby	Glovibes, Leonardo Abbate

==== As featured artist ====
Year	Title	Album	Writer(s)	Producer(s)
2025	"Beauty School Dropout)" (Shontelle Sparkles featuring Sasha Colby)	Butterfly Effect (Deluxe Edition)	Drew Louis, Jayelle, Shawn Davis Berger	Drew Louis
2023	"Goddess (Sasha Colby)" (The Cast of RuPaul's Drag Race season 15)	Non-album singles	Brett McLaughlin	Leland
2023	"Blame it on the Edit" (RuPaul featuring Sasha Colby, Anetra, Luxx Noir London, and Mistress Isabelle Brooks)	Non-album singles	Frederick Minano, RuPaul Andre Charles	RuPaul, Skeltal Ki
2023	"Wigloose: The Rusical!" (The Cast of RuPaul's Drag Race season 15)	Wigloose: The Rusical!	Brett McLaughlin, John Polly, Michael Seligman, Thomas C Campbell	Leland, Gabe Lopez
2023	"Golden Years" (Sasha Colby, Malaysia Babydoll Foxx, Aura Mayari, and Spice)	Non-album singles	Brett McLaughlin, Frederick W. Scott	Leland, Freddy Scott
2023	"One Night Only" (The Cast of RuPaul's Drag Race season 15)	Non-album singles	David Benjamin Steinberg, John Polly, Michael Seligman, Thomas C Campbell	David Benjamin Steinberg
2021	"Monster" (She & The Bandit and Sasha Colby)	Non-album singles	Ryan Douglas Adames	No producer credited

=== Music videos ===
Year	Title	Artist	Ref.
2016	"Tongue Pop the Halls"	Alyssa Edwards	
2017	"Divas Medley"	Justin Michael Williams feat. Nina Bo'Nina Brown, Aja, & Eureka O'Hara	
2017	"She's Gotta Habit"	Detox feat. Ellis Miah & Keisha Henry	
2018	"Excuse the Beauty"	Latrice Royale	
2019	"Brown Cow Stunning (Mitch Ferrino Mix)"	Mo Heart	
2021	"GAP"	Heidi N Closet feat. Widow Von'Du	
2021	"Queen of the North"	Brooke Lynn Hytes feat. Priyanka	
2021	"Do You Like to Party?"	TaylorXO feat. Gigi Gorgeous	
2023	"Blame It on the Edit"	RuPaul ft. Anetra, Luxx Noir London & Mistress Isabelle Brooks	
2023	"Feel the Power - Extended Club Mix"	Sasha Colby, Glovibes, Luciana	

== Awards and nominations ==
Year	Award ceremony	Category	Work	Results	Ref.
2023	2023 Virgin Atlantic Attitude Awards	The Drag Award	Herself	Honored	
2023	2023 Variety's Women of Reality TV	Breakthrough Stars of Reality TV	RuPaul's Drag Race	Honored	
2025	Queerty Awards	Drag Royalty	Herself	Won	

Awards and achievements
Preceded by Willow Pill	Winner of RuPaul's Drag Race; US season 15	Succeeded by Nymphia Wind
