= Nomi Kane =

American editorial cartoonist

Nomi Kane (born 1984, California) is an American editorial cartoonist, and toy designer. Kane is best known for work featuring politics, California culture, dogs, and baseball. Her work has been featured in The New Yorker, The Nib, and Mad Magazine.

== Early and personal life ==
Kane was interested in art from a young age, an interest encouraged by her family. She earned a film degree from Columbia College Chicago in 2006. Kane earned an M.F.A. from the Center for Cartoon Studies in 2011. She currently lives in Berkeley, California.

Kane has type 1 diabetes.

== Career ==
Kane attended the Center for Cartoon Studies from 2009-2011, in White River Junction, Vermont. Her thesis project, Sugar Baby, was a memoir mini-comic exploring her childhood living with type 1 diabetes. Rob Clough of The Comics Journal called the piece one of the Top 30 Minicomics of the year.

In 2010, she was the cartoonist-in-residence at the Cartoon Art Museum. After graduating from CCS, she took a teaching job in the San Francisco Bay Area.

In 2013, Kane began working for Schulz Studio as a Staff Artist, continuing the legacy of Peanuts cartoonist Charles M. Schulz. As part of that work, Kane was the lead artist on a Peanuts coloring book for adults. In June 2013, Greil Marcus included Kane's work in his "Real Life Rock Top Ten" column, saying of her autobiographical work,"[Kane's] thin, plain lines and utter refusal of caricature or exaggeration produce a pathos and sweetness that capture the pain of children that parent's can't touch".

Kane also contributed to the 2019 graphic novel This Is What Democracy Looks Like: A Graphic Guide to Governance and the 2020 graphic novel Guantanamo Voices.

Her art was featured in the Emerging Artist Showcase at the Cartoon Art Museum from October 2021 to April 2022. She had previously participated in the museum's Sketch-A-Thon fundraiser at San Diego Comic-Con in 2018.

By 2018, Kane was working as a Toy Designer and Art Director for San Francisco-based Super 7.

== Comic book credits ==
- Lies Grown-ups Told Me (2011) - editor
- Comic Book Guide to the Mission (2013, Skodaman Press) -
- Wings for Wheels (2013) - editor and artist
- Adventure Time: Candy Capers #1 (2014, Boom Studios) - cover artist
- Jewish Comix Anthology #1 (2014, Alternative History Comics, Inc.)
- As You Were: Living Situations #4 (2016)
- Peanuts #8 - colorist/letterer (2016, Boom Studios)
- Peanuts Friends Forever 2016 Special. Trajectory, Incorporated. 2016-07-06. ISBN 978-1-68159-822-2. - colorist
- "Plan C" in Comics for Choice (2017) - artist
  - Later republished in Littlejohn, Krystale E.; Solinger, Rickie, eds. (2024-03-19). Fighting Mad: Resisting the End of Roe V. Wade. University of California Press. pp. 28–33. ISBN 978-0-520-39677-7.
- Mad about the Trump Error (2019, MAD) - writer/artist
- Guantanamo Voices (2020, Abrams ComicsArt) - artist
- "Talking Biofabrication with MIT's Dr. Ritu Ruman". The Curie Society, Volume 2: Eris Eternal. MIT Press. 2024-03-26. ISBN 978-0-262-37176-6. - artist

== Film credits ==
- Cartoon College (2012) - Cas
