= Center for Cartoon Studies =

Art school in White River Junction, Vermont

Coordinates: 43.64467°N 72.318402°W

- Type: Two-Year Unaccredited
- Established: 2004; 22 years ago
- Affiliations: Vermont Higher Education Council
- Budget: $1.1 million (2020)
- President: Michelle Ollie
- Director: James Sturm
- Academic staff: 9
- Students: 48
- Location: Hartford, Vermont, United States
- Campus: Urban
- Website: www.CartoonStudies.org

The Center for Cartoon Studies (CCS) is a two-year institution focusing on sequential art, specifically comics and graphic novels. It is located in the village of White River Junction within the town of Hartford, Vermont. The Center offers a Master of Fine Arts degree, both one and two-year certificate programs, and summer programs. It is "the only college-level training program of its kind in the United States."

== History ==
The Center for Cartoon Studies was founded by cartoonist James Sturm and professor Michelle Ollie in 2004, with its first class of 18 students in the Fall of 2005. The first class of students were accepted less on the quality of their drawing and more on their critical thinking skills, literary merit, storytelling abilities, and curiosity.

The Center's first commencement took place on May 19, 2007, with roughly 20 students graduating. In 2007 CCS was approved by the State of Vermont to award Master of Fine Arts degrees and certificates, which have been awarded to students from all subsequent classes. It currently has a student body of 48 students with an average age of 24. About 20 new students are accepted each year.

The school educates students to be proficient in all aspects of graphic design and production, including self-publication and promotion. This is a notable step away from the specialized production model of mainstream comics companies such as Marvel Comics and DC Comics, wherein writing, pencilwork, inking, coloring, and lettering are most often handled by separate individuals. This inclination is in part due to many of the faculty's and significant donor Peter Laird's experience with alternative comics. The State of Vermont Department of Education approved CCS for degree granting authority and the school is also a member of Vermont Higher Education Council.

== Campus ==
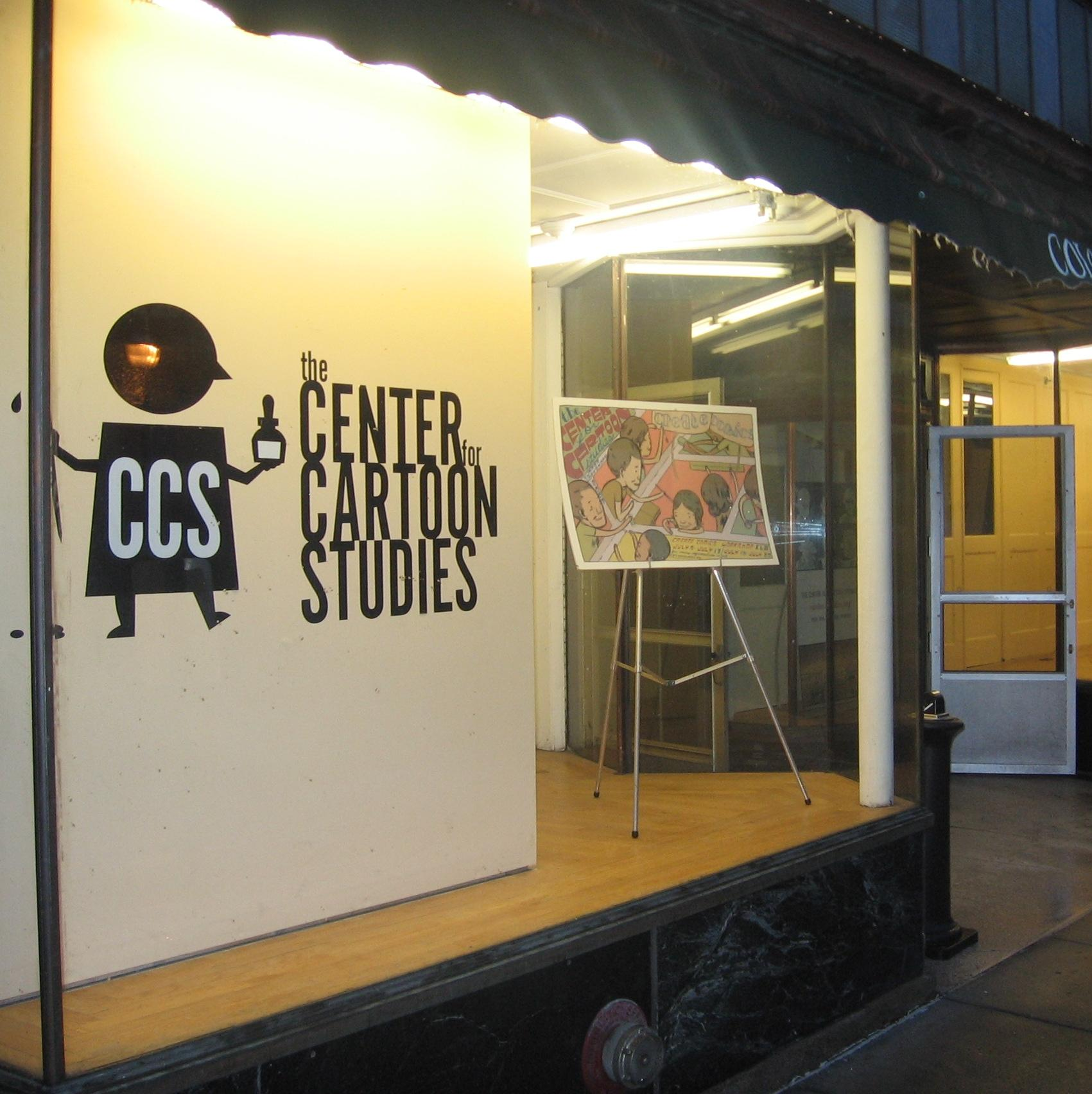
The front window of the Center for Cartoon Studies in the former Colodny’s Surprise Department Store

The Center for Cartoon Studies currently operates out of two buildings in the historic district of White River Junction, Vermont. The school rents space in the former Colodny’s Surprise Department Store Building, and in December 2011 the school purchased a former Post Office a few buildings down from Department Store Building. The school's Schulz Library used to be housed in a former fire station on Bridge Street, a building also occupied by the Main Street Museum, but had to be evacuated in August 2011 due to flood waters from Hurricane Irene.

=== Colodny’s Surprise Department Store ===
All the main operational and educational facilities of the Center for Cartoon Studies are located in the former Colodny’s Surprise Department Store Building. Built in 1929, the building is the only Art Deco building in downtown White River Junction, and is built partially with Antique Verde marble quarried from Rochester, Vermont. CCS inhabits the first floor and basement of the building and includes multiple offices, a classroom, and an "open basement studio."

=== Post Office ===
The Former Post office Building in downtown White River Junction was purchased by the school in December 2011. The brick building was constructed in a Colonial Revival architectural style and was built in 1934 as a Works Progress Administration structure. This building will become the main structure for the Center for Cartoon Studies and includes classrooms, faculty offices and lounges, and the Schulz Library. The top floor of the Post Office Building is still rented to the current tenants. It also includes studio space for the Inky Solomon Center, a grant-program geared towards CCS alumni, their comics, and community outreach.

== Schulz Library ==
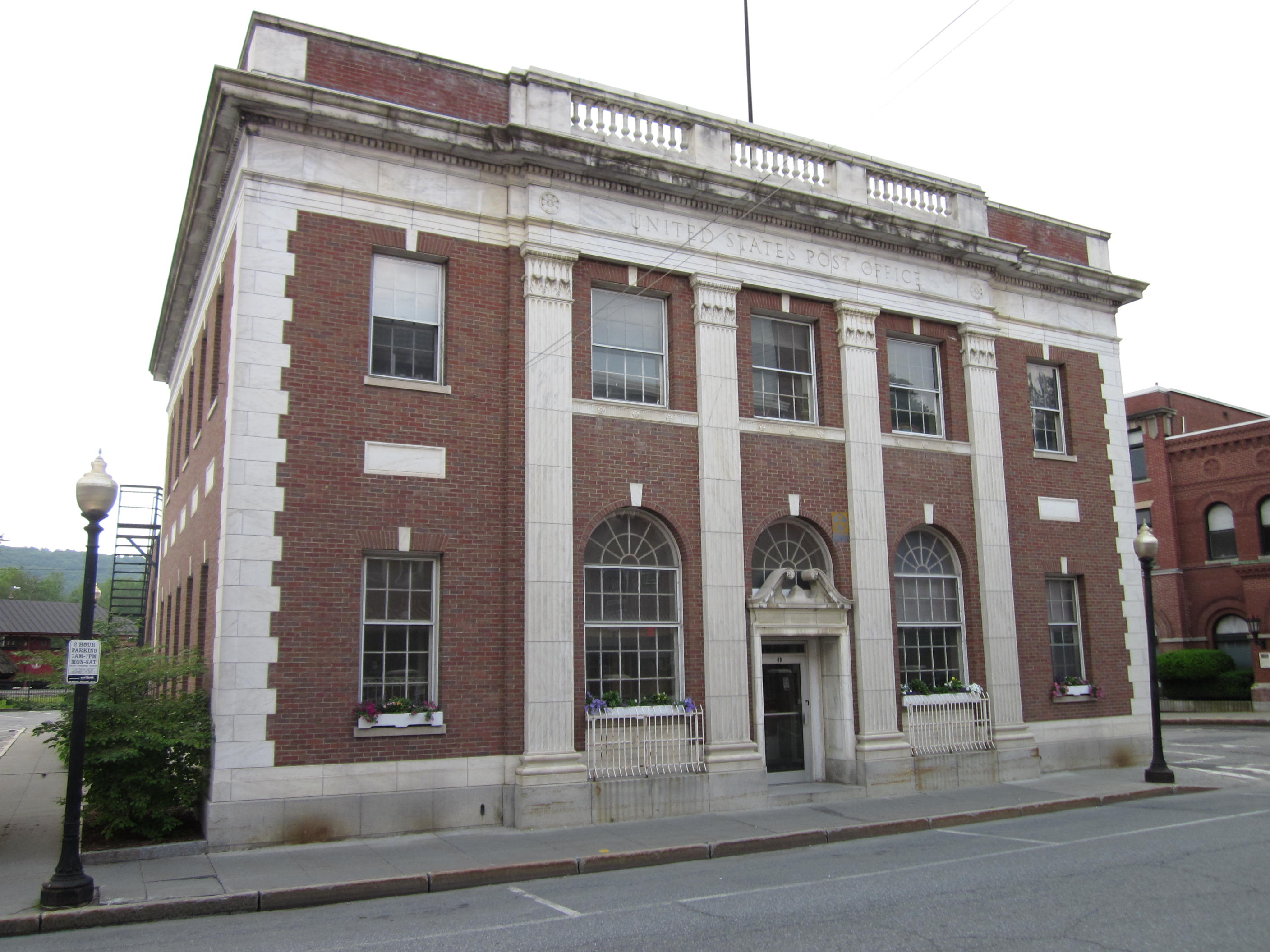
Former White River Junction Post Office and current CCS main building

The Schulz Library, named after Charles M. Schulz, is the official library of the Center for Cartoon Studies and currently houses over 20,000 titles. The Library's collection focuses on comic books, graphic novels, as well as "books about cartooning – both academic and instructional." The Schulz's collection has grown largely from donations from collectors and publishers, as well as artists.

Special collections located at the Library include a large collection of rare and hard-to-find Peanuts books (by the library's namesake Charles M. Schulz), collections of gag cartoons, classic newspaper comic strips, zines and minicomics, as well as "a near-complete run of The Comics Journal." Many hard-to-find titles and previews of student work are featured on the Schulz Library Blog.

The material in the library was previously housed in the former Bridge Street firehouse, owned by the Main Street Museum. It had to be evacuated in August 2011 due to flood waters from Hurricane Irene. In 2012 the Schulz library was moved to the Post Office Building the CCS purchased in 2011.

== Academics ==
The Center for Cartoon Studies offers a Master of Fine Arts degree, both one and two-year certificate programs, as well as summer programs.

Each term, roughly 14 well-known cartoon artists and others in the field come to CCS as visiting faculty and guest lecturers. The visiting faculty lecture, critique, and discuss with students of the school the student work and their own. Past visiting faculty have included Alison Bechdel, Ed Brubaker, Ivan Brunetti, James Kochalka, Jason Lutes, Scott McCloud, Seth, Art Spiegelman, Craig Thompson, and Chris Ware.

A senior thesis is required at the Center, which usually involves the creation of a full-scale graphic novel or a full year's worth of work.

== Publishing ==
=== The Center for Cartoon Studies Presents ===
The publishing imprint "The Center for Cartoon Studies Presents", under the direction of series editor James Sturm, has published a number of young adult graphic novels on historical subjects:

- James Sturm (w), Rich Tommaso (a). Satchel Paige: Striking Out Jim Crow (December 18, 2007). Hyperion Books. ISBN 978-0786839001
- John Porcellino (w, a). Thoreau at Walden (April 22, 2008). Little, Brown Books for Young Readers. ISBN 978-1423100386
- Jason Lutes (w), Nick Bertozzi (a). Houdini: The Handcuff King (July 8, 2008). Little, Brown Books for Young Readers. ISBN 978-0786839032
- Sarah Stewart Taylor (w), Ben Towle (a), James Sturm (ed). Amelia Earhart: This Broad Ocean (January 1, 2010). Hyperion Books.
- Joseph Lambert (w, a). Annie Sullivan and the Trials of Helen Keller (March 27, 2012). Hyperion. ISBN 978-1423113362 — winner of the 2013 Eisner Award for Best Reality-Based Work and nominated for the 2013 Eisner Award for Best Publication for Teens; included on the 2013 Great Graphic Novels for Teens list; 2012 Cybils Award finalist
- Glynnis Fawkes (w, a). Charlotte Brontë Before Jane Eyre (September 24, 2019). Little, Brown Ink. ISBN 978-1368045827 — introduction by Alison Bechdel
- Whit Taylor (w), Kazimir Lee (a). Harriet Tubman: Toward Freedom (June 15, 2021). Little, Brown Ink. ISBN 978-0759555518 — introduction by Carole Boston Weatherford

==== Adventures in Cartooning ====
A subset of The Center for Cartoon Studies Presents is Adventures in Cartooning, a series of elementary school-level how-to books on making comics, by James Sturm, Andrew Arnold, and Alexis Frederick-Frost, and published by First Second Books:

- Adventures in Cartooning vol. 1 (2009)
- Adventures in Cartooning vol. 2: Characters in Action (2013; enhanced edition, 2023)
- Sleepless Knight (2015)
- Gryphons Aren't So Great (2015)
- Ogres Awake! (2016)
- Hocus Focus (2017)
- Adventures in Cartooning vol. 3: Create a World (2023)

=== Applied Cartooning Projects ===
- This Is What Democracy Looks Like, A Graphic Guide to Governance (2019) by Dan Nott, with Kevin Czap, Hallie Jay Pope, Summer Pierre, Nomi Kane, Eva Sturm-Gross, Michelle Ollie, and James Sturm
- Let's Talk About It: A Graphic Guide to Mental Health (2020) by Cara Bean
- Health and Wealth: A Graphic Guide to the U.S. Healthcare System (2021) by Kazimir Lee
- Freedom and Unity: A Graphic Guide to Civics and Democracy in Vermont (2022) by Dan Nott, with James Sturm, Susan Clark, Kit Anderson, and Glynnis Fawkes
- How we Read: a Graphic Guide to Literacy (2023) by Daryl Seitchik

== Faculty ==
In addition to Sturm, Stephen R. Bissette, Jason Lutes and Alec Longstreth are permanent faculty. For the 2011–2012 school year, cartoonist and animator Robert Sikoryak joined the faculty.

== Students ==
Students and alumni from the Center for Cartoon Studies have received Ignatz Awards, Eisner Award nominations and Xeric Foundation grants for their work. One alumnus, who launched their drag career while attending the school, has won RuPaul's Drag Race.

- Robyn Chapman - CCS Fellowship, Xeric Foundation grant, Theater of the Meek
- Charles Forsman - 2013 Ignatz Award for Outstanding Minicomic for The End of the Fucking World, 2008 Ignatz Awards for Outstanding Comic and Outstanding Series for Snake Oil
- Colleen Frakes - Xeric Foundation grant, Tragic Relief, 2009 Ignatz Award, Promising New Talent, Woman King
- Alexis Frederick Frost - Xeric Foundation grant, La Primavera
- Samuel Gaskin - Xeric Foundation grant, Pizza Wizard
- Alex Kim - Xeric Foundation grant, Wall City
- Alec Longstreth- CCS Fellowship, 2005 Ignatz Award for Outstanding Minicomic (Phase 7), 2007 Ignatz Award for Outstanding Debut Comic (Papercutter #6)
- Annie Murphy - Xeric Foundation grant, I Still Live: Biography of a Spiritualist
- Gabby "Ken Dahl" Schulz - CCS Fellowship, 2007 Ignatz Award Best Mini-Comic, Monsters, 2010 Ignatz Award Best Story, Monsters. 2010 Eisner Award nominee, Best Reality-Based Work for Monsters.
- James Sturm - 2010 Ignatz Award Outstanding Graphic Novel, Market Day
- Melissa Mendes - Xeric Foundation grant, Freddie
- Laura Terry - Xeric Foundation grant, Overboard
- Sasha Velour - Winner of RuPaul's Drag Race Season 9
- Tillie Walden - 2016 Eisner Nomination Best Single Issue/One Shot, I Love This Part, 2017 Eisner nomination for Best Digital Comic, On a Sunbeam

== Documentary ==
CCS is the subject of a documentary film, Cartoon College, by Josh Melrod and Tara Wray. The film follows a group of CCS students from the 2008, 2009, 2010 and 2011 classes and includes interviews with notable faculty and luminaries. It has been screened at film festivals in California, Vancouver (Canada), Washington, Florida, Glasgow, Maryland and of course, White River Junction. Future shows include New York City, Atlanta and New Zealand.

== See also ==
- The Kubert School
- Billy Ireland Cartoon Library & Museum
