= Mark D. Steinberg =

American historian (born 1953)

- Born: June 8, 1953 (age 73); San Francisco, California, U.S.
- Education: University of California, Santa Cruz (BA); University of California, Berkeley (MA, PhD)
- Spouses: Jane Hedges (1980–2015); Daniela Steila (m. 2020)
- Children: 1, Sasha

Mark D. Steinberg (born June 8, 1953) is a historian, writer, and professor. He taught at Harvard University, Yale University, and the University of Illinois, Urbana-Champaign, from which he retired in 2021. He is the author of books and articles on Russian history and comparative urban history.

== Early life and education ==
He was born in San Francisco, California. He received a B.A. (1978) from the University of California, Santa Cruz, followed by M.A (1982) and Ph.D. (1987) degrees in history from the University of California, Berkeley. At Illinois, from 1996 until his retirement in 2021, he held the position of Professor, Department of History at University of Illinois. He was also Professor in the Department of Slavic Languages and Literatures there (since 2005) and the Unit for Criticism and Interpretive Theory (since 2007); from 1998 to 2004 he was Director of their Russian, East European, and Eurasian Center. From August 2006 until August 2013, he was the editor of the interdisciplinary journal Slavic Review.

Before coming to Illinois in 1996, he was an Assistant Professor of History at Harvard University from 1987 to 1989, and at Yale from 1989–1994, where he was promoted to Associate Professor (1994–96).

== Publications ==
=== Books written ===
- Mark D. Steinberg, Moral Storytelling in 1920s New York, Odessa, and Bombay. Bloomsbury, 2025.
- Nicholas V. Riasanovsky and Mark D. Steinberg. A History of Russia, 7th-10th editions, Oxford University Press, 2007-2025.
- Mark D. Steinberg, Russian Utopia: A Century of Revolutionary Possibilities. Bloomsbury, 2021.
- Mark D. Steinberg, The Russian Revolution, 1905–1921. Oxford University Press, 2017. Russian translation, 2018.
- Mark D. Steinberg, Petersburg Fin de Siècle. Yale University Press, 2011.
- Mark D. Steinberg, Proletarian Imagination: Self, Modernity, and the Sacred in Russia, 1910–1925. (Cornell University Press, 2002, ISBN 978-0-8014-8826-9. Russian translation, 2022.
- Mark D. Steinberg, Voices of Revolution, 1917 (in the series “Annals of Communism,”) Yale University Press, 2001 ISBN 978-0-300-09016-1
- Mark D. Steinberg and Vladimir M. Khrustalëv, The Fall of the Romanovs: Political Dreams and Personal Struggles in a Time of Revolution. In the series Annals of Communism, Yale University Press, 1995 ISBN 978-0-300-06557-2.
    - translated into Portuguese as, A queda dos Romanov : a história documentada do cativeiro e execução do último czar e sua família Rio de Janeiro: Jorge Zahar, 1996 ISBN 978-85-7110-375-7
    - translated into Japanese, 1997
    - translated into Russian as: Skorbnyi put’ Romanovykh (1917–1918 gg): Gibel’ tsarskoi sem’i (in the series “Arkhiv noveishei istorii Rossii: Seriia ‘Publikatsii,’" ROSSPEN, Moscow, 2001)
- Mark D. Steinberg, Moral Communities: The Culture of Class Relations in the Russian Printing Industry, 1867‑1907 University of California Press, 1992. ISBN 978-0-520-07572-6

=== Books edited ===
- Mark D. Steinberg and Valeria Sobol, eds., Interpreting Emotions in Russia and Eastern Europe. Northern Illinois University Press, 2011.
- Mark D. Steinberg and Catherine Wanner, eds.Religion, Morality, and Community in Post-Soviet Societies. Woodrow Wilson Center Press and Indiana University Press, 2008 ISBN 978-0-253-35266-8
- Mark D. Steinberg and Heather J Coleman, eds. Sacred Stories: Religion and Spirituality in Modern Russia. Indiana University Press, 2007. ISBN 978-0-253-34747-3
- Stephen Frank and Mark D Steinberg, eds. Cultures in Flux: Lower Class Values, Practices and Resistance in Late Imperial Russia. Princeton University Press, 1994. ISBN 978-0-691-00106-7.

== Personal life ==
Mark Steinberg was married to Jane T. Hedges from 1980 until her death in 2015. Their only child is a son, Alexander "Sasha" Hedges Steinberg, an author, visual artist, producer, and drag queen (under the name Sasha Velour).

== External links (Sources) ==
- CV at University of Illinois
- Departmental web page at University of Illinois
