= South Beach (nightclub) =

Nightclub in Houston, Texas, U.S.

Coordinates: 29.74702°N 95.39052°W

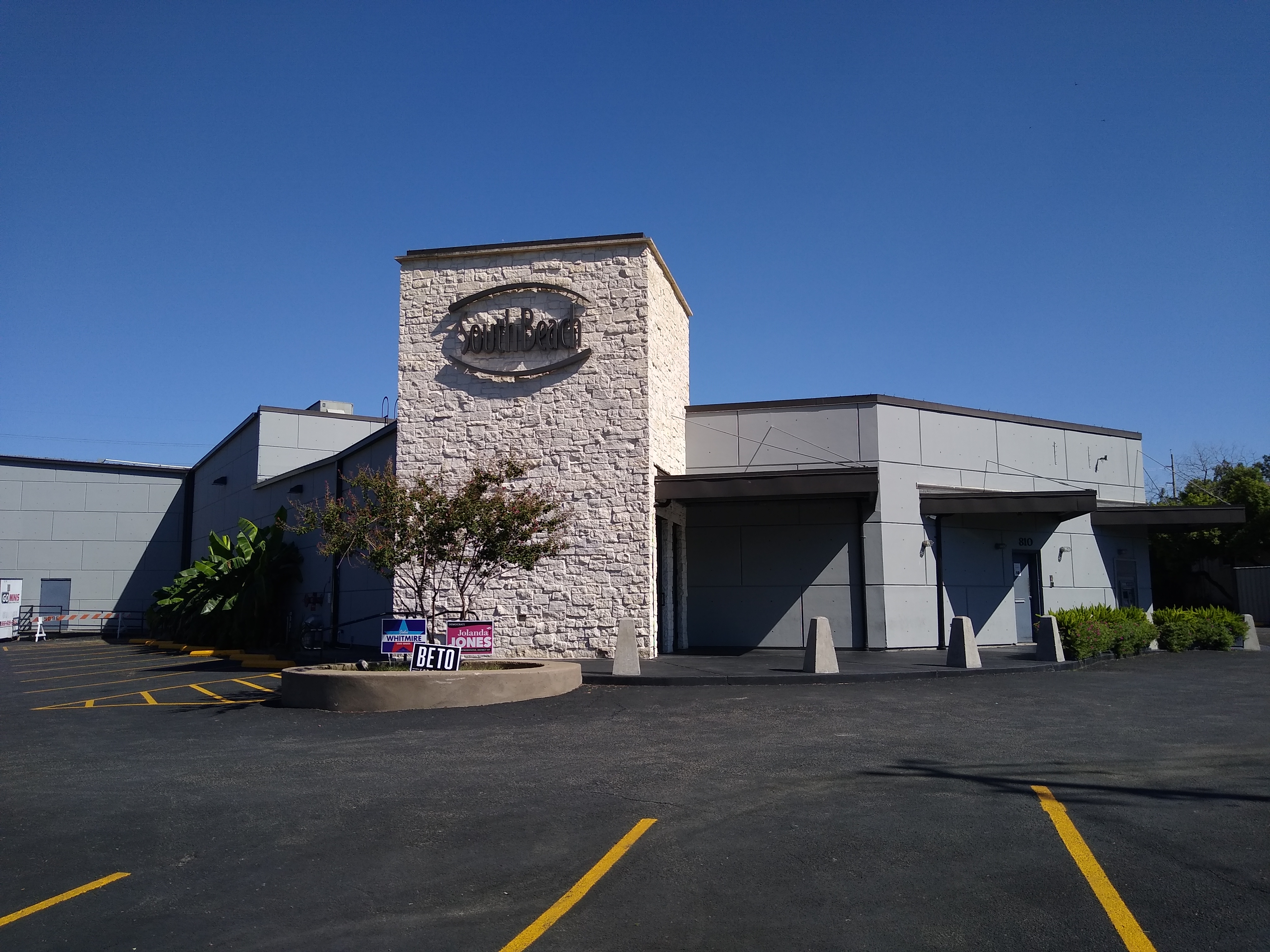
- Interactive map of South Beach
- Address: Houston, Texas; United States
- Type: Nightclub

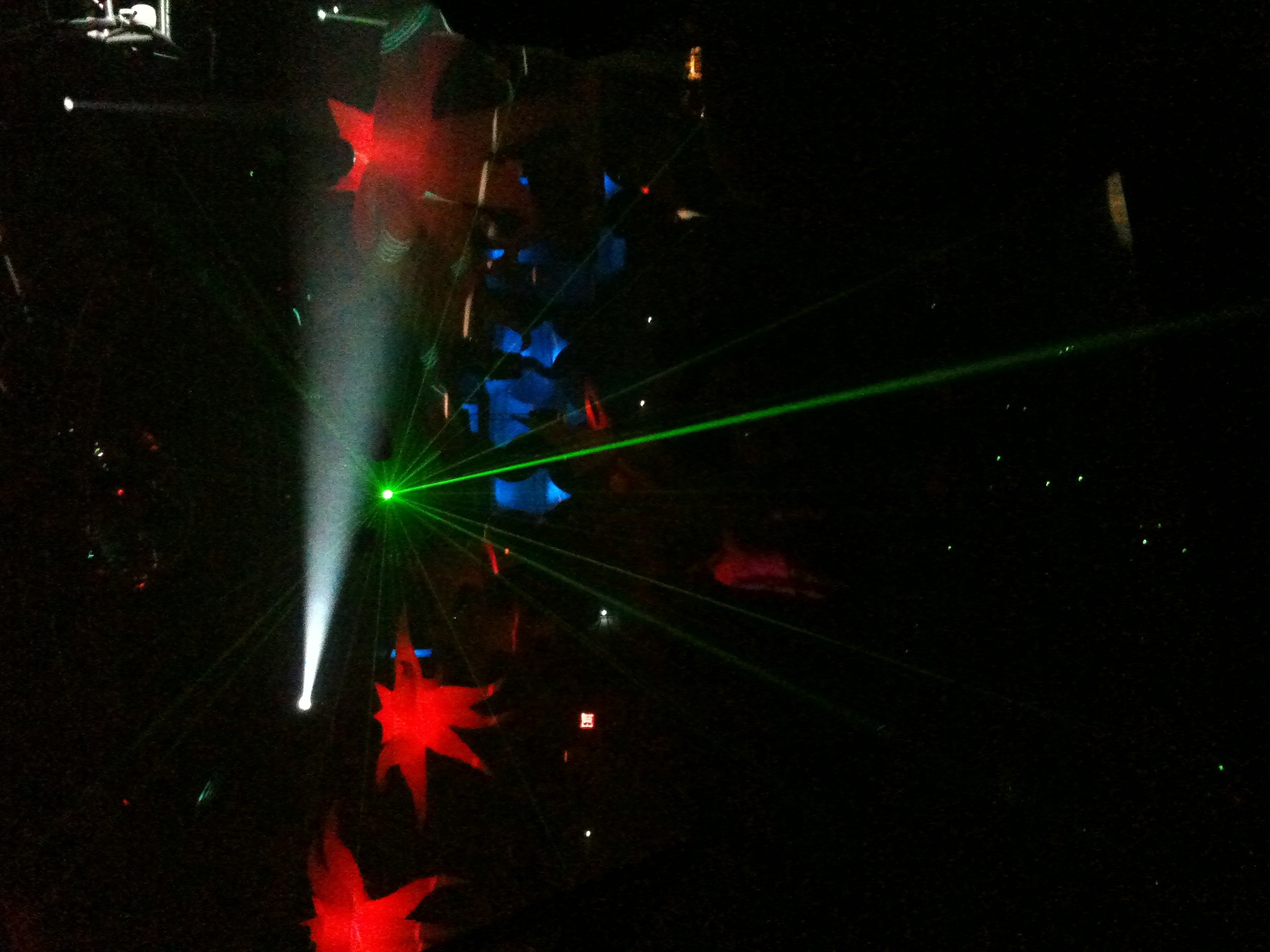
Laser light show at South Beach

South Beach is a nightclub with after hours located in Houston, Texas within the Neartown area which opened in 2001 on the former site of Club Heaven. The 10,000-square-foot (930 m^{2}) dance club located at 810 Pacific Street was popular among the city's gay community. Among South Beach's many features was a full-color water-cooled matrix laser light show utilizing Kryogen Ifex liquid ice jets that spray out a thick cloud of liquid Ice. The ice jets had the ability to reduce the temperature of the club by 20 °F (−7 °C) in a few seconds.

South Beach is owned by Charles Armstrong. Charles Armstrong also owns JR's Bar & Grill, and formerly owned Meteor Urban Lounge, and Montrose Mining Company before they closed.

== Reception ==
In 2007, the club was voted Houston's Best Gay Bar by AOL City Guide and again was awarded Houston's Best Gay Bar 2008 and Houston's Best Dance Club 2008 by AOL City Guide. The club was previously awarded as one of the "Best of 2006" by the Houston Press.

== See also ==
- List of LGBTQ bars
