= Your Daily Horoscope =

American animated sitcom

- Genre: Animated sitcom
- Created by: Kelly Landry; Will Arnett; Tom Werner
- Voices of: Janet Varney; Josh Robert Thompson; Griffin Burns; Stephanie Kerbis
- Composer: Ryan Huntley Andrews
- Country of origin: United States
- Original language: English
- No. of seasons: 1
- No. of episodes: 86

Production
- Executive producers: Kelly Landry; Will Arnett; Tom Werner
- Editors: Samantha Bode; Ash L. Brown; Aurora De Lucia; Sam Geer; Tony J. Gomez; Bruce Guido; Erin Hassidim; Anand Mahalingam; Justin Marra; Gabriel A. Montoya; David Palmeri; Joseph Shahood
- Production company: ATTN:

Original release
- Network: Quibi
- Release: July 6 – October 30, 2020

Your Daily Horoscope is an American animated sitcom created by Will Arnett, Tom Werner and Kelly Landry for Quibi. The series premiered on April 6, 2020, airing five days a week. It was ordered for a second season, before being cut short due to Quibi shutting down.

== Premise ==
Twelve millennial zodiac characters who work at Estrella, a technology start-up, have a themed daily episode to each of their respective horoscope readings. Each character will be an anthropomorphic animal represents their zodiac sign.

== Production ==
Will Arnett partnered with Aliza Kelly, an astrologer from Cosmopolitan to create the horoscopes of the characters.
