= Sasha Velour =

American drag performer and artist

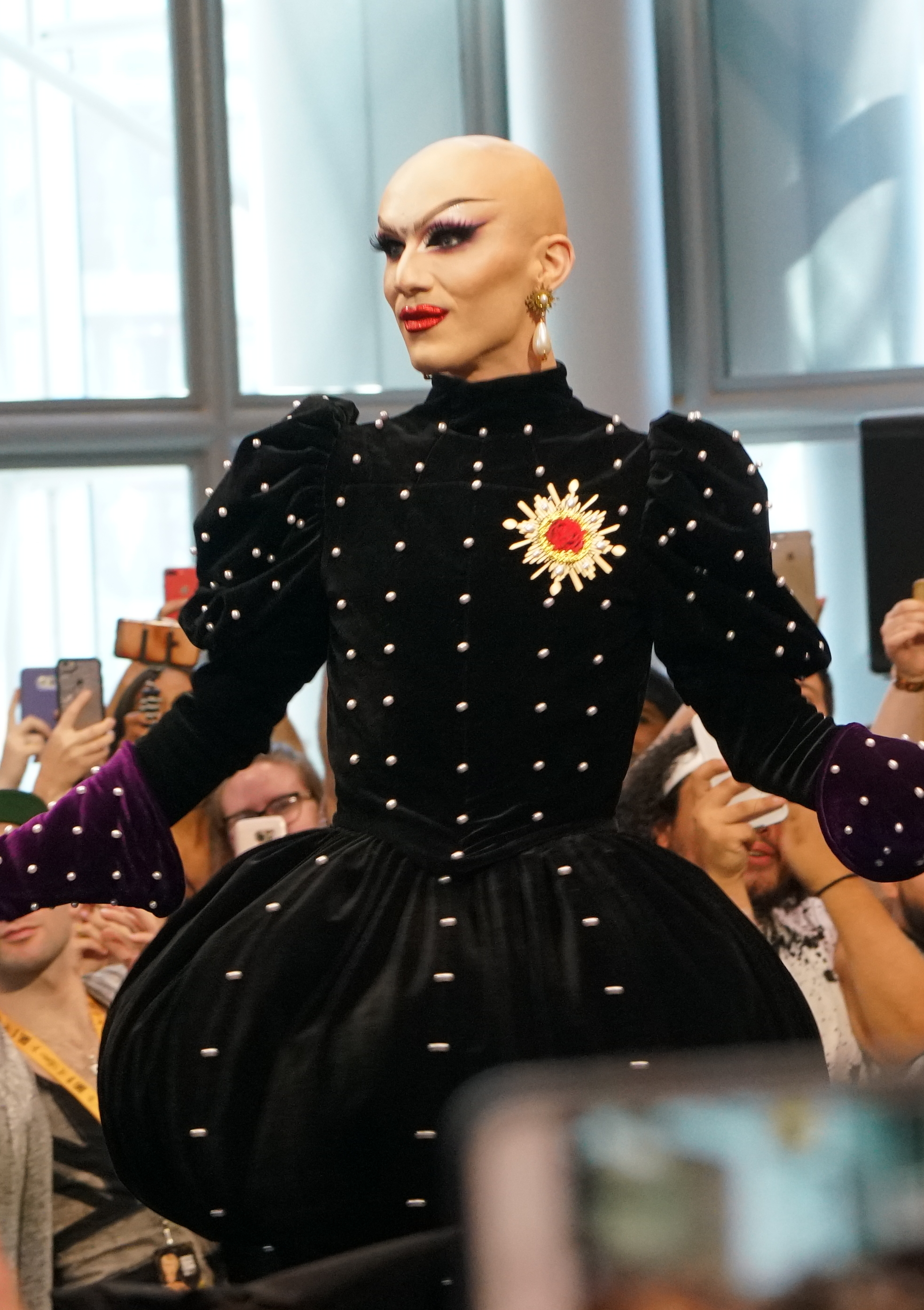
- Sasha Velour at RuPaul's DragCon NYC in 2017
- Born: Alexander Hedges Steinberg; June 25, 1987 (age 39); Berkeley, California, U.S.
- Education: Vassar College (AB); Center for Cartoon Studies (MFA)
- Occupations: Drag queen, artist, actress, cartoonist, costume designer, television producer
- Years active: 2009–present
- Known for: RuPaul's Drag Race (season 9) winner
- Partner: Johnny Velour
- Father: Mark D. Steinberg
- Website: sashavelour.com

Alexander "Sasha" Hedges Steinberg (born June 25, 1987), known professionally as Sasha Velour, is an American drag queen, artist, actress, author, and stage and television producer, based in Brooklyn, New York. Steinberg is known for winning the ninth season of RuPaul's Drag Race, her drag revue NightGowns, and her one-queen theatrical work, Smoke & Mirrors.

== Early life and education ==
Born in Berkeley, California, Steinberg was raised in New Haven, Connecticut, until the age of nine when her family moved to Urbana, Illinois. Steinberg is the only child of Mark Steinberg, a scholar of Russian history and professor in the Department of History at University of Illinois, Urbana-Champaign, and Jane Hedges, who served as editor at Yale University Press and managing editor of the Slavic Review. Steinberg is of Russian Jewish descent on her father's side, and identifies with her father's faith. Her grandmother emigrated from the Ukrainian Soviet Socialist Republic via Manchuria.

Steinberg graduated from University Laboratory High School in Champaign-Urbana in 2004. After high school, she spent a year abroad with family and worked as a part-time security guard at the Russian State Hermitage Museum in St. Petersburg, Russia, and interned at the Staatsoper (State Opera) in Berlin, Germany.

Steinberg obtained an A.B. from the Independent Program (with a focus on Modern Literatures) from Vassar College in 2009. In 2010, she was a Fulbright Scholar in Moscow and completed a project that aimed to understand the role of different art forms in contemporary Russian society. She received an M.F.A. in cartooning in 2013 from the Center for Cartoon Studies in White River Junction, Vermont. Prior to pursuing drag as a full-time career, Steinberg worked as a freelance graphic designer and illustrator, an English language tutor, and as head of production for the children's book publisher, Toon Books.

== Career ==
=== Illustration and graphic design ===
Steinberg moved to New York with her partner John Jacob Lee (known professionally as Johnny Velour) in 2013. She created comics and zines that she self-published and sold at conventions. Steinberg's work was also published in The Nib, InkBRICK, Comics Workbook Magazine, QU33R, Cicada Magazine and others, under the names Sasha Velour and Sasha Steinberg. Steinberg also created a comic entitled Stonewall, which attempted to tell the story of the Stonewall riots using real and fictional characters. The work was called "a smart, beautiful and artful take on a significant and difficult historical event" by Highlow Comics. Steinberg's visual art has been the subject of two solo gallery shows. A show entitled “What's Your Drag” was on display at Be Gallery NYC in spring 2014 (in connection with BeFluent, the English school where she taught), and another solo show entitled "Nightrooms", was held at the Black Box Gallery (located in Bizarre Bushwick) in Brooklyn in March 2016. Steinberg's cut paper work was part of the group show "Coney Island Babies, Visual Artists from the Brooklyn Drag Scene" at the Bureau of General Services Queer Division that opened in Manhattan in November 2012. In March 2017, Steinberg designed a long sleeve T-shirt for "Contemporary Drag", a limited-edition fashion line for the New Art Dealers Alliance's (NADA) in collaboration with Print All Over Me and she performed at the NADA show that month.

Steinberg featured as the cover artist for the June 12, 2023 issue of The New Yorker.

=== Early drag ===
Steinberg started performing in drag while studying at The Center for Cartoon Studies in Vermont. She also met her partner John Jacob Lee (known as Johnny Velour) in Vermont when he was acting in a production of Annie. In the spring of 2013, Steinberg and her partner staged Whatever She Wants, A Drag Musicale at the Main Street Museum featuring local residents. She called producing the show a "milestone" of her drag career and moved to Brooklyn later that year.

Steinberg began performing in New York City in early 2014. She founded Velour, The Drag Magazine (originally named Vym), a magazine about drag, alongside partner Johnny in the summer of 2014. The magazine included interviews as well as varied art forms such as photography, poetry, and illustration that address the power, beauty, and purpose of drag. Three issues were published over two years and the magazine was compiled into a 300-page hardcover book in 2018.

Steinberg began producing a monthly drag show, NightGowns, in August 2015, at Bizarre Bushwick. The show has been regularly hosted at Bizarre Bushwick and National Sawdust, both in Brooklyn New York. The shows have been celebrated as "beautiful and funny and politically charged" by The New York Times. It was later adapted into a TV series for Quibi.

=== RuPaul's Drag Race ===
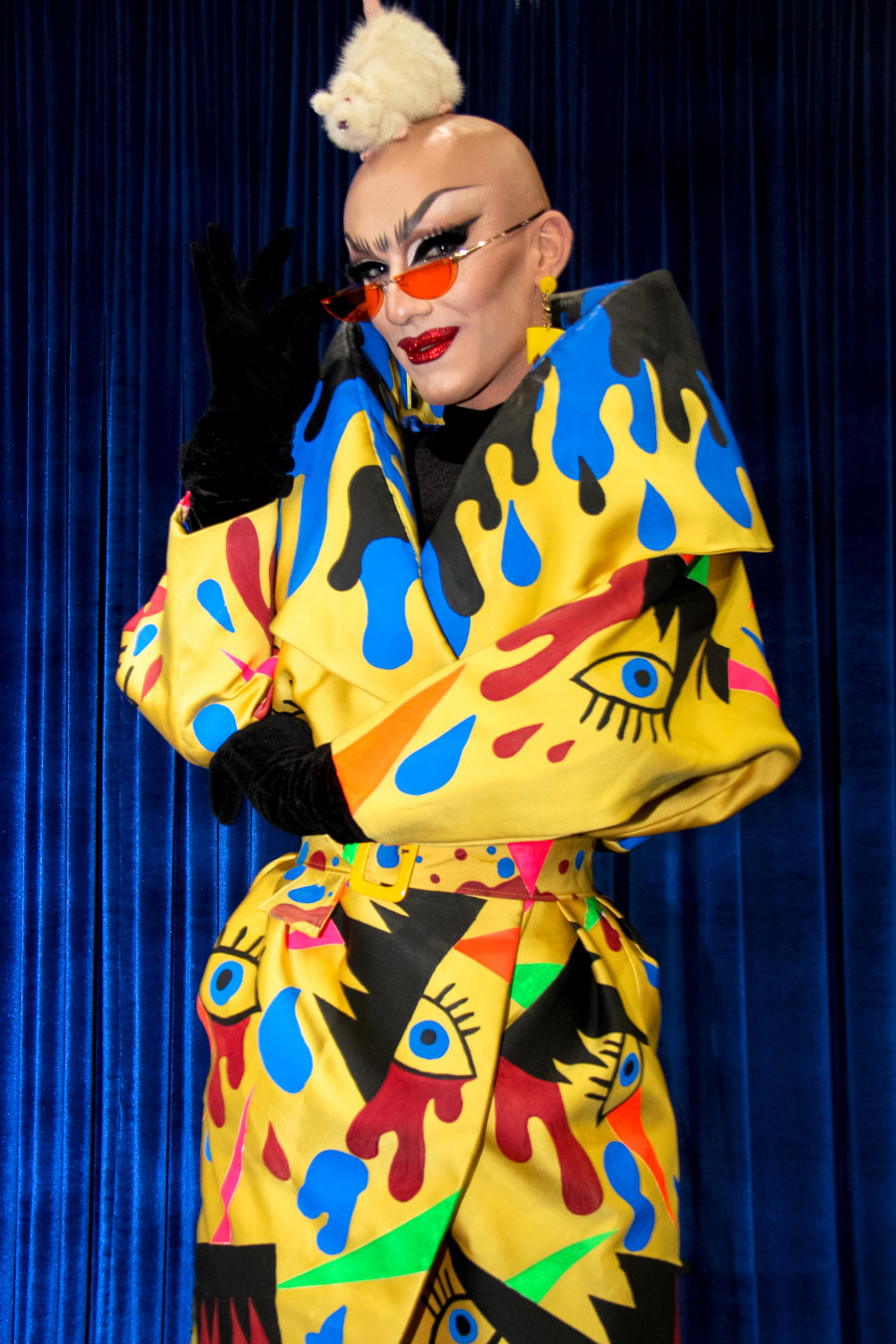
Sasha Velour at RuPaul's DragCon LA, 2018

Steinberg auditioned for RuPaul's Drag Race's eighth season but was not selected to participate. In 2017, she competed in and ultimately won the ninth season of the show. Steinberg's lip sync to Whitney Houston's "So Emotional" in the season finale was named “performance of the year” by The A.V. Club and was also named one of "TV's Best Musical Moments" by Entertainment Weekly. The lip-sync was later referenced on Saturday Night Live, during Kate McKinnon's impression of Elizabeth Warren.

During the airing of the show, Steinberg starred in the music video for the non-record single "C.L.A.T." alongside fellow New York City drag artists Peppermint, Aja and Alexis Michelle, all of whom also appeared on the ninth season of Drag Race.

=== Post-Drag Race success ===
Steinberg founded The House of Velour in 2017, a production company that she uses to produce stage, film work and merchandise. KC Ifeyani at Fast Company said the company was "disrupting the business of drag". Steinberg expanded her drag showcase NightGowns, moving it from Bizarre Bushwick to National Sawdust in April 2017. The show also toured to Los Angeles, London, and played at Terminal 5 in New York City, with Janet Jackson in attendance.

In 2018, Steinberg partnered with Opening Ceremony to host and direct their New York Fashion Week show. Steinberg selected 40 LGBTQ+ models to walk, creating the first all queer show in New York Fashion Week history. The show featured other notable drag performers (Lypsinka, Shea Couleé, Jiggly Caliente, Miss Fame, Farrah Moan, Hungry, and more) as well as a surprise performance from Christina Aguilera.

In 2017, Google commissioned Steinberg to create a Google Doodle of German singer-actress Marlene Dietrich which appeared on Google's homepage on December 27, 2017, the 116th anniversary of Dietrich's birth. Steinberg impersonated Dietrich in the Snatch Game challenge on season 9 of RuPaul's Drag Race. For the 50th anniversary of the Stonewall uprising in 2019, Steinberg published a detailed history comic about the events of that night titled Three Dollar Riot. She had first begun working on the comic years before for her thesis project at the Center for Cartoon Studies; a previous version of the comic was published in 2012 under the name Stonewall.

Variety featured Steinberg in the "Power of New York List 2019", and she appeared in Out's annual OUT100 list twice (2017 and 2019). In June 2019, a panel of judges from New York magazine placed Steinberg 12th on their list of "the most powerful drag queens in America", a ranking of 100 former Drag Race contestants.

During a period of isolation brought on by the COVID-19 pandemic in the summer of 2021, Steinberg produced a series of papier-mâché masks called "Faces of Drag", which honors ten pioneers in "the world history of drag". Those highlighted by the series include Izumo no Okuni, Rebecca and Her Daughters, William Dorsey Swann, Mei Lanfang, Barbette, Josephine Baker, Coccinelle, José Sarria, and Divine.

Steinberg has spoken at the Teen Vogue Summit (June 2018), The Long Conversation at the Smithsonian in Washington, D.C. (Dec. 2018) and for colleges including Purdue, The University of Illinois at Urbana Champaign, Columbia, Oakland University, and more. She has appeared on the covers of Wussy Magazine, Plastik Magazine, Bricks, GayTimes, and she art-directed her pet Italian Greyhound, Vanya's, cover shoot of Dog Magazine which featured an interview with Steinberg. Her home was featured in People magazine.

=== TV and film work ===
In 2018, Steinberg self-produced a short film entitled Pirate Jenny, which included Steinberg performing her own translation of the famous The Threepenny Opera song of the same name. The work was shown as part of the group art show "Bona Drag: An Incomplete History of Drag and Cross-Gender Performance in Film and Video Art (Part 1)" at the Rhode Island School of Design that opened in November 2018.

In 2019, Steinberg appeared as herself on episodes of the television shows The Bold Type and Broad City.

Steinberg adapted her stage show NightGowns into an 8-episode docu-series for the short-form platform Quibi, and it premiered on April 6, 2020. She was executive producer and starred in the show, and produced it with the Documentary Group and music video director Sophie Muller. NightGowns followed Steinberg and a cast of drag performers across eight episodes as she transforms NightGowns into a full-blown stage act. The New York Times said it was "among the most life-affirming shows you could find on any platform". A second season was ordered in August 2020, but Quibi ceased operations in late 2020. In 2021, NightGowns won the RealScreen Award for "Digital Content, Short Form Content, Non-Fiction”.

In March 2021, Steinberg starred in Angélica Negrón's The Island We Made, a short art-opera film commissioned by Opera Philadelphia. The film was directed by Matthew Placek. In July 2023, it was announced that Steinberg, alongside Priyanka and Jaida Essence Hall, would be the new hosts of the fourth season of the reality television series We're Here. The three replaced the previous hosts, Eureka, Shangela, and Bob the Drag Queen.

=== Smoke & Mirrors ===
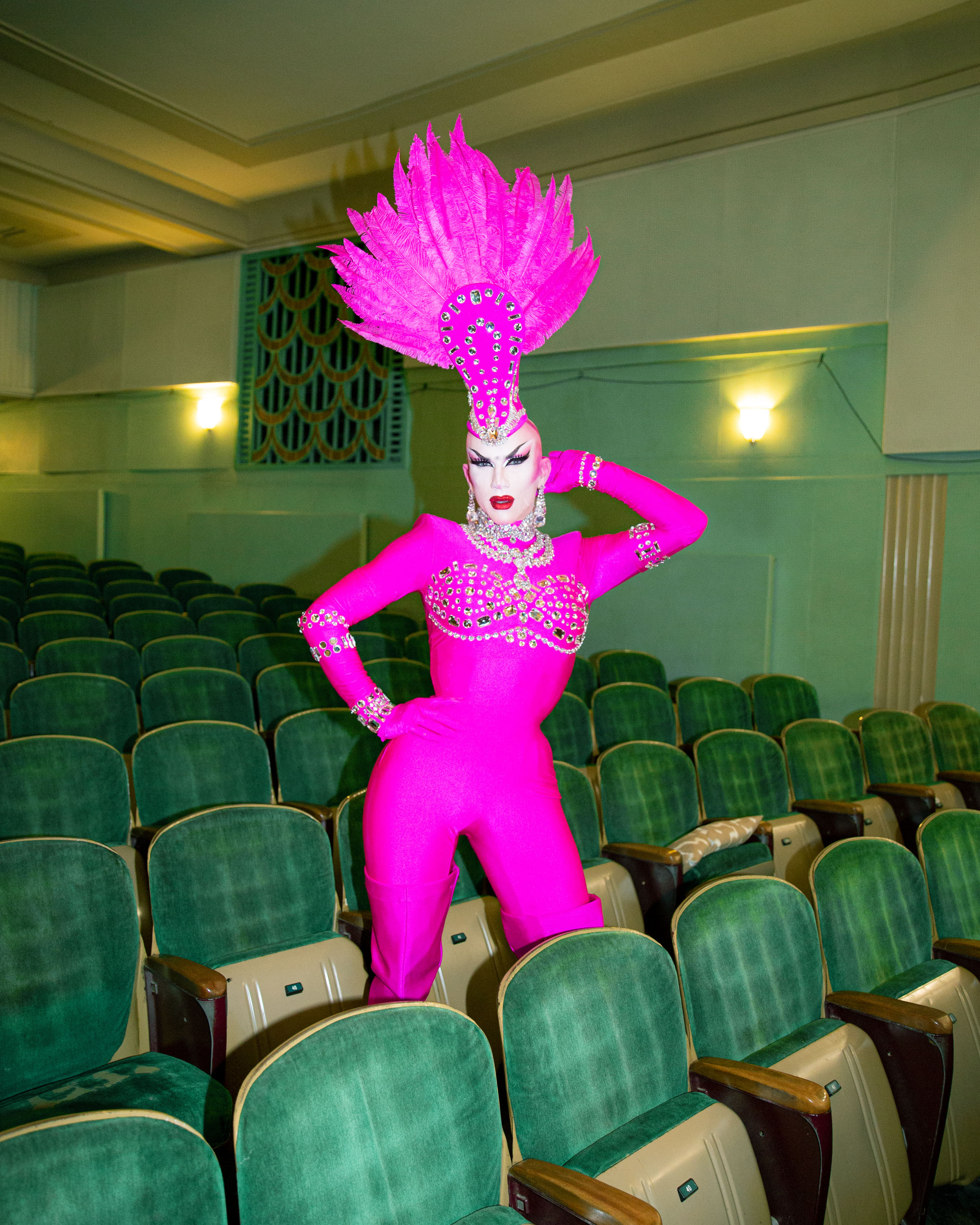
Steinberg before a performance of her show Smoke & Mirrors in Bath, UK, 2022

On January 9, 2019, Steinberg premiered her first evening-length solo theater show, Smoke & Mirrors, in Canberra, Australia during a seven-city tour of Australia and New Zealand produced by ITD Events. The US premiere of Smoke & Mirrors was held on March 21, 2019, at New York Live Arts where it played eight sold-out shows. In May 2019, Steinberg performed the show at The Theatre At The Ace in Los Angeles, and on August 9 and 10, 2019, she performed two sold-out shows at the O_{2} Shepherd's Bush Empire in London. The show was also performed at Purdue University and the University of Illinois at Urbana-Champaign that fall.

A 23-city (24 show) tour of the US and Canada opened in San Antonio, Texas on October 21, 2019, and closed in San Francisco, California on November 30, 2019. A 16-city tour of the United Kingdom and the European Union opened on March 2, 2020, in Birmingham, England. After seven performances, the tour was cut short due to the COVID-19 pandemic. The last performance was played in Dublin, Ireland on March 11, 2020. The European tour resumed in February 2022, playing 36 shows in often sold-out theaters in 33 cities across 17 countries, reaching from Ireland to Poland.

=== 2023–present ===
In 2023, Steinberg's book The Big Reveal: An Illustrated Manifesto of Drag was published by Harper. The book was later adapted for the stage, and played in American and European theaters.

Steinberg was featured on the June 2023 cover of the ELLE View, the digital edition of ELLE Brasil.

In March 2026, Steinberg's show Travesty will make its world premiere at the Woolly Mammoth Theatre Company in Washington, D.C., followed by a 24-city European tour, starting on May 2, 2026, in Vienna, Austria and concluding on June 12 in Seville, Spain.

== Personal life ==
As of 2013, Steinberg resides in Brooklyn with partner Johnny Velour and her pet Italian Greyhound, Vanya. Steinberg is genderfluid and uses the pronouns she/they when not in drag. Her drag persona, Sasha Velour, uses the pronouns she/her. Steinberg has a shaved head. She often performs in drag bald, as a tribute to her mother, Jane Hedges, who died of cancer in 2015 and had lost her hair during treatment for the disease.

== Filmography ==
=== Television ===
Year	Title	Role	Notes
2017	RuPaul's Drag Race	Herself (Contestant)	Season 9 (Winner)
2019	Broad City	Herself	Guest Appearance
2019	The Bold Type	Herself	Guest Appearance
2023	Drag Race Germany	Herself	Guest Judge
2024	We're Here	Herself	Host
2025	King of Drag	Herself	Judge

=== Web series ===
Year	Title	Role	Notes
2017	RuPaul's Drag Race: Untucked	Herself	Season 9
2020	The Pit Stop	Herself	Season 12, Episode 1
2020	NightGowns	Executive Producer / Herself	Quibi original
2020	The X-Change Rate	Herself	Guest
2023	Entertainment Tonight Canada	Herself	Guest
2023	Very Delta	Herself	Guest

=== Short film ===
Year	Title	Role	Notes
2021	The Island We Made	Narrator	Short art-opera film commissioned by Opera Philadelphia

== Published works ==
Year	Title	Genre
2012	Stonewall	History comic
2018	VELOUR: The Drag Magazine	Art book
2019	Three Dollar Riot	History comic
2020	Creature from the Vinyl Lagoon	Zine
2023	The Big Reveal: An Illustrated Manifesto of Drag	Book

== Awards and nominations ==
Year	Award giving body	Category	Work	Results	Ref.
2017	Brooklyn Nightlife Awards	Drag Queen of the Year	Herself	Won	
2017	Brooklyn Nightlife Awards	Best Visual Artist	Herself	Won	
2017	Brooklyn Nightlife Awards	Best Event Producer	House of Velour	Won	
2018	Brooklyn Nightlife Awards	Best Event Producer	House of Velour	Nominated	
2020	Queerty Awards	Drag Royalty	Herself	Nominated	
2021	RealScreen Awards	Digital Content - Short-Form Content - Non-Fiction	NightGowns	Won	
2022	Trinity University's Philosophical Society	The Gold Medal of Honorary Patronage	Herself	Won	
2023	Peabody Awards	Entertainment	We're Here	Won	

== See also ==
- LGBTQ culture in New York City
- List of LGBTQ people from New York City

Awards and achievements
Preceded by Bob the Drag Queen	Winner of RuPaul's Drag Race; US season 9	Succeeded by Aquaria
