= NightGowns =

American streaming television series

- Genre: Docuseries
- Created by: Sasha Velour
- Starring: Sasha Velour; Johnny Velour; Sasha Colby; Vander Von Odd; Neon Calypso; K.James; Miss Malice; Untitled Queen
- Country of origin: United States
- Original language: English
- No. of seasons: 1
- No. of episodes: 8

Production
- Executive producers: Sasha Velour; Sophie Muller; Gabrielle Tenenbaum; Jo Budzilowicz; Tom Yellin
- Producer: Erin Glass
- Cinematography: Stephen Bailey
- Editors: Vito DeCandia; Yvette Wojciechowski
- Running time: 7–9 minutes
- Production company: The Documentary Group

Original release
- Network: Quibi
- Release: April 6 – April 13, 2020

NightGowns is a television documentary series featuring Sasha Velour that premiered on the mobile streaming service Quibi on April 6, 2020. Season one of the series consists of eight episodes, each of which focuses on one of the main cast members of Velour's NightGowns stage drag show.

On August 10, 2020, the series was renewed for a second season. However the future of the series is unknown due to the announcement of Quibi's shutdown in October 2020.

== Episodes ==
No.	Title	Original release date
1	"Welcome to NightGowns"	April 6, 2020
2	"The Ensemble"	April 6, 2020
3	"Sasha Colby"	April 6, 2020
4	"Vander Von Odd"	April 7, 2020
5	"Neon Calypso"	April 8, 2020
6	"K.James"	April 9, 2020
7	"Untitled Queen"	April 10, 2020
8	"Sasha Velour"	April 13, 2020
