= Main Street Museum =

Curiosity museum in White River Junction, Vermont

- Location in Vermont
- Established: December, 1992 (built before 1893)
- Location: 58 Bridge Street, White River Junction, Vermont, United States
- Coordinates: 43.6499°N 72.3189°W
- Visitors: Approximately, 2000/year
- Public transit access: Amtrak, bicycle
- Website: www.mainstreetmuseum.org
- Governance: Beneficent Committee/Non-profit, 501c03

The Main Street Museum is a museum and event space in White River Junction, Vermont. The museum is meant to evoke an 18th or 19th century cabinet of curiosities, and displays unusual and offbeat items, such as miniature shoes, unused keys, or hair locks from former presidents. It is also an event space, hosting drag events, concerts, poetry readings, and artwork by local artists. On its website, the museum is described as "a repository of artifacts and a public performance space".

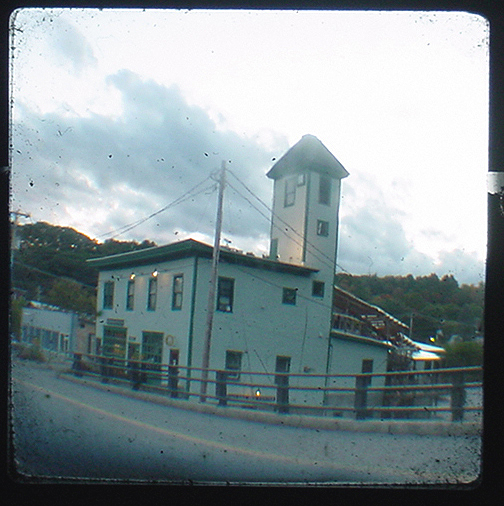
The Fire Station Building, showing the main entrance to the museum, center, in 2008, by Aaron Almanza

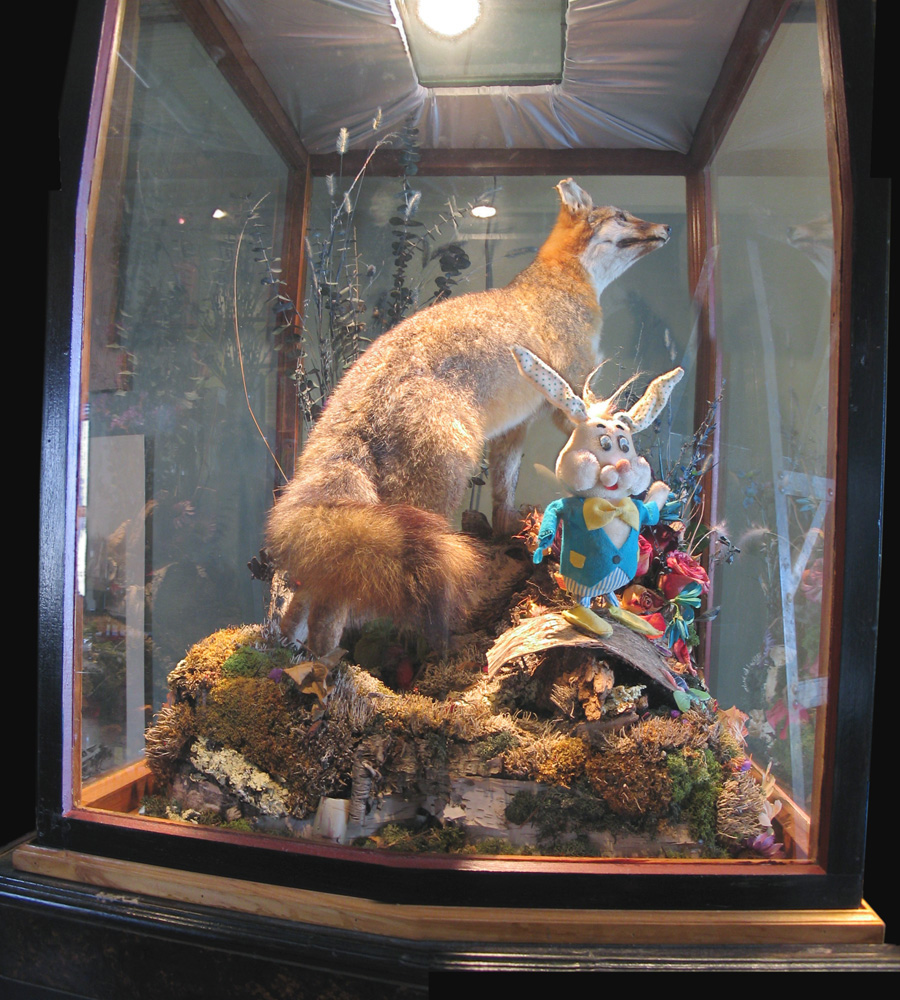
The Happy Family or Fox and Rabbit. Both trickers and shape-shifter transgressors.

== Overview ==
The Main Street Museum was founded in 1992 by career artist David Fairbanks Ford. The building is White River Junction's former fire station on Bridge Street, next to the railroad underpass on the banks of the White River.

The museum's collections of material culture are seemingly unfocused. Its collection includes taxidermy, miniature shoes, keys collected by Ford, Elvis Presley's gallstones, hair clippings of former presidents, and dirt from outside of Charles Lindberg's house. Many of the items came from the attics of Ford's relatives.

One of the museum's main attractions is a working 1930 Æolean Stroud Pianola, which was donated during the COVID-19 pandemic. The museum regularly holds performances of the pianola, and has 10,000 rolls of sheet music that it can play.

The museum also serves as an event venue, hosting concerts, weddings, screenings of science fiction films, and cabaret performances. RuPaul's Drag Race contestant Sasha Velour performed at the museum prior to appearing on the show. The museum also hosts art from local artists, including high school students.

== History ==
The museum was badly damaged by Hurricane Irene in 2011.

During the COVID-19 pandemic, the museum took in no revenue and relied solely on a grant from the Vermont Arts Council to avoid closure. After that, the museum became available on appointment only, or when hosting events.

== Reception ==
In Weird New England, Joe Citro wrote that the museum "forces one to contemplate the nature of museums and curating. Why do we save what we save? How do we decide what to discard, what to display, what to hide away, and what to destroy."

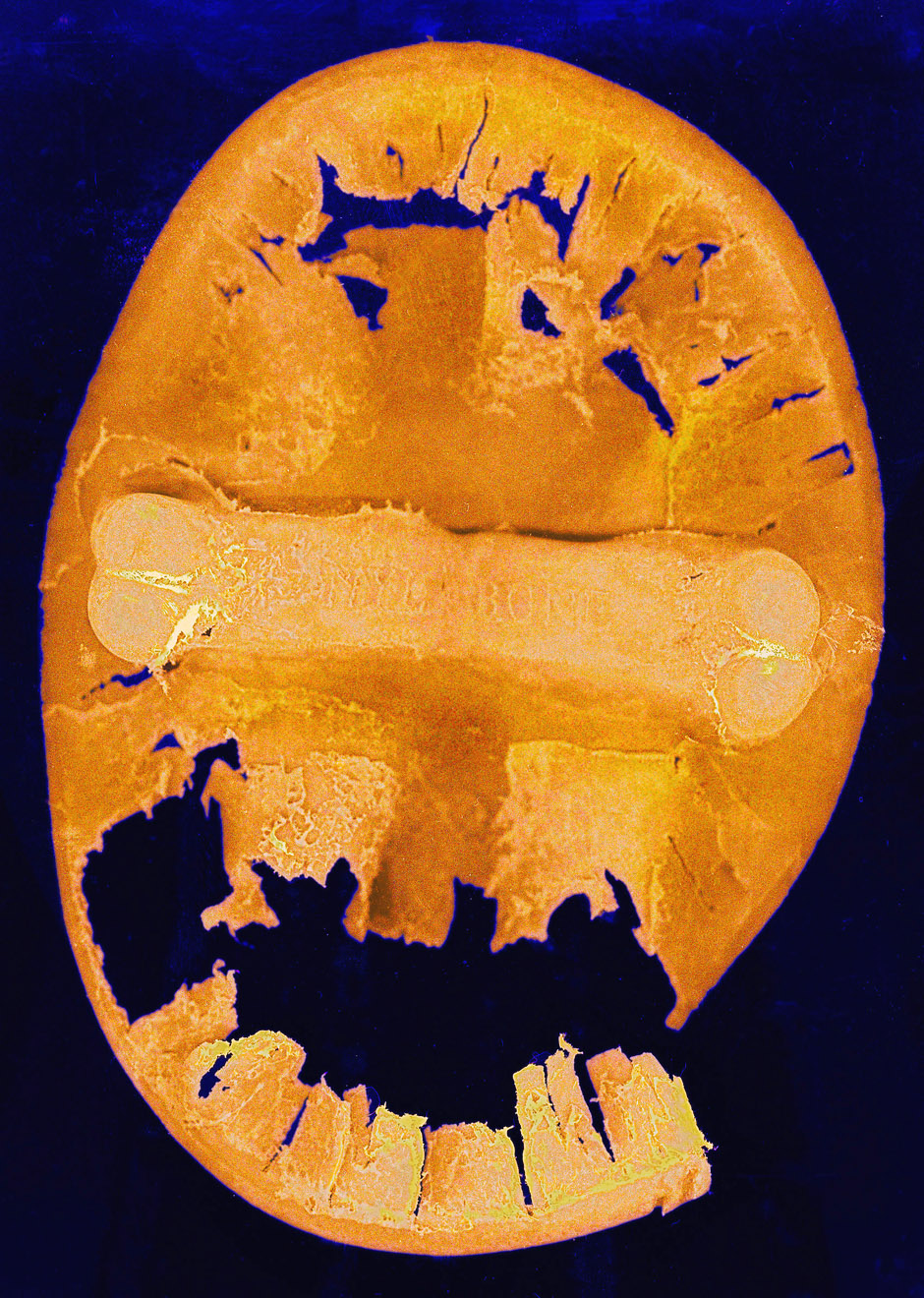
Frisbee of Tui, the dog, exhibited in a combined exhibition with Dartmouth College in 2003

== Publications ==
- What is It? We Have It! You Want to See It!, Description of the organization. White River Junction, 2008.
- Description of the Collections, with pl., White River Junction, 2007.
- The Arts; All Of Them, In White River Junction, Vermont, Hartford, 2000.
- “There Ought To Be A Plaque,” article on Main Street Museum Building and White River Jct. history, Out In The Mountains, Burlington, VT, February, 1998.
- The Mangelsdorf Tripartite Theory of Corn Genetics, Published by the Museum, with pls. Hartford, Vermont, 1998.
- Pickled Eggs In Tar, An Intermittently Sulfurous Specimen, fl;189;66;em, “Number 001 in the Series...Prepared Under the Auspices Of The First Branch Memorial,” Hartford Village, 1998.
- "The Diary of Sabrina Hoisington,” Vermont Genealogy, vol. 1, no. 2 April 1996. (Separately published as a booklet, with pls, 1997.)
- Big Fish and Good Looking Women (exhibit catalogue for the photos of Jack Rowell), Main Street Museum, White River Jct., 1996.
