= Montrose Mining Company =

Defunct gay bar in Houston, Texas, U.S.

- Interactive map of Montrose Mining Company
- Address: Houston, Texas
- Type: Gay bar

Construction
- Opened: 1978
- Closed: 2016

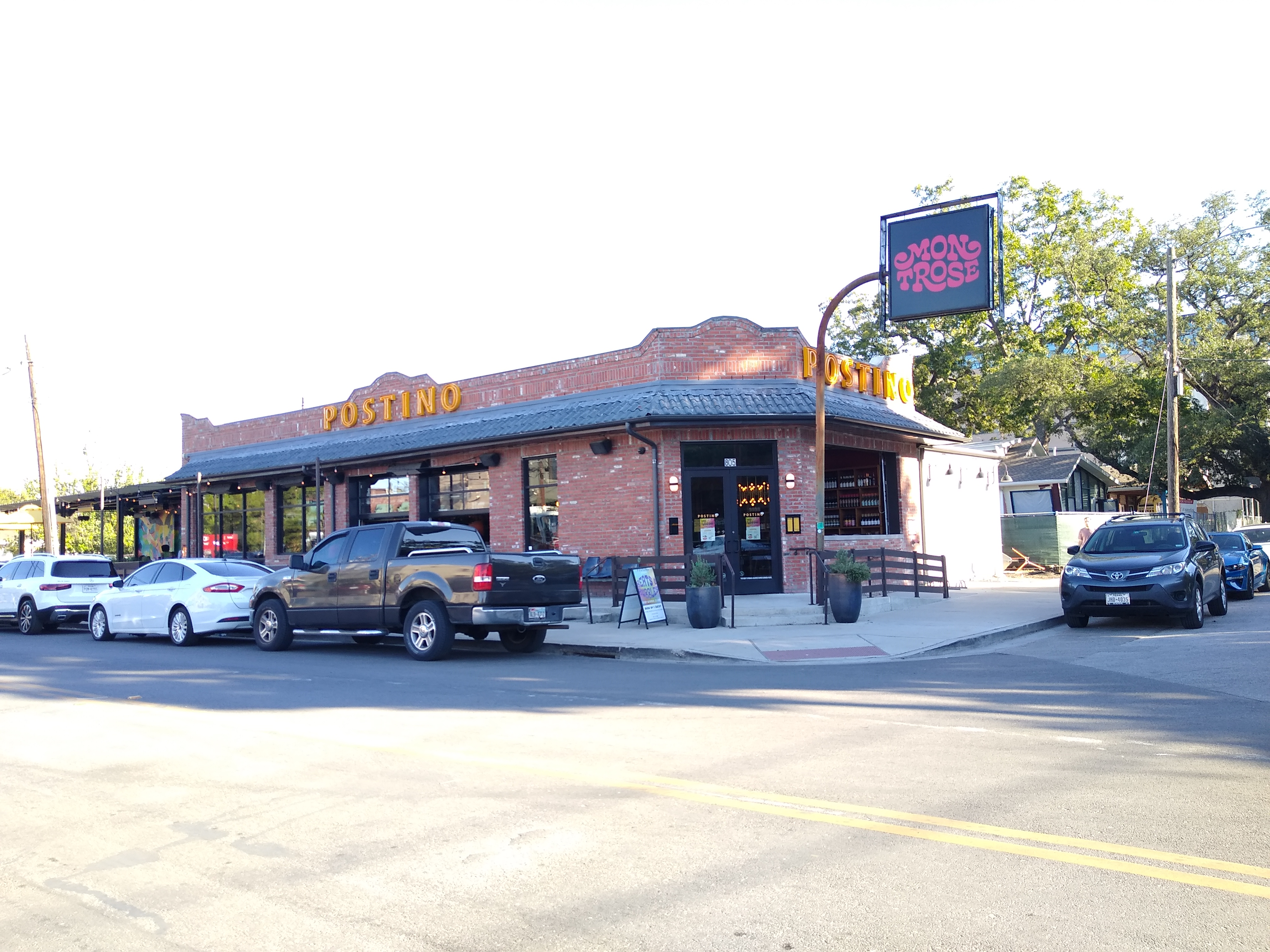
Postino Montrose, formerly Montrose Mining Company

Montrose Mining Company was a gay bar in the Montrose neighborhood of Houston, Texas, United States. Having opened in March 1978, it was the oldest gay bar in Houston until the closing of EJ's in June 2014. Although it mainly catered to the leather and Levi's subcultures, it was regularly attended by all members of the LGBT community.

== Description ==
Montrose Mining Company is located in the Montrose neighborhood of Houston, Texas. Montrose Mining Company was voted Best Gay Bar by the Houston Press in 2009.* It was also voted one of the 200 best gay bars in the world by Out Traveler in 2015.

== History ==
Before establishment of the Montrose Mining Company, several earlier bars had existed on the spot at 805 Pacific Street in Montrose. The first recorded there was The Tattooed Lady, which opened around 1970 and closed by December 1974. By that time, a new gay and drag bar, Pacific Street Station, had been established and was attracting patrons with big-name performances, such as Eartha Kitt. It is unknown when Pacific Street Station closed, but in January 1977, a new cruise bar by the name of Uncle Charlie's replaced it. Uncle Charlie's closed in March 1978.

In 2016 Charles Armstrong, the owner, announced it was closing, arguing the concept was out of date.

It is now used as Postino Wine Cafe Montrose, a restaurant.
