= JR's Bar and Grill =

Gay bar in Houston, Texas, U.S.

- Logo

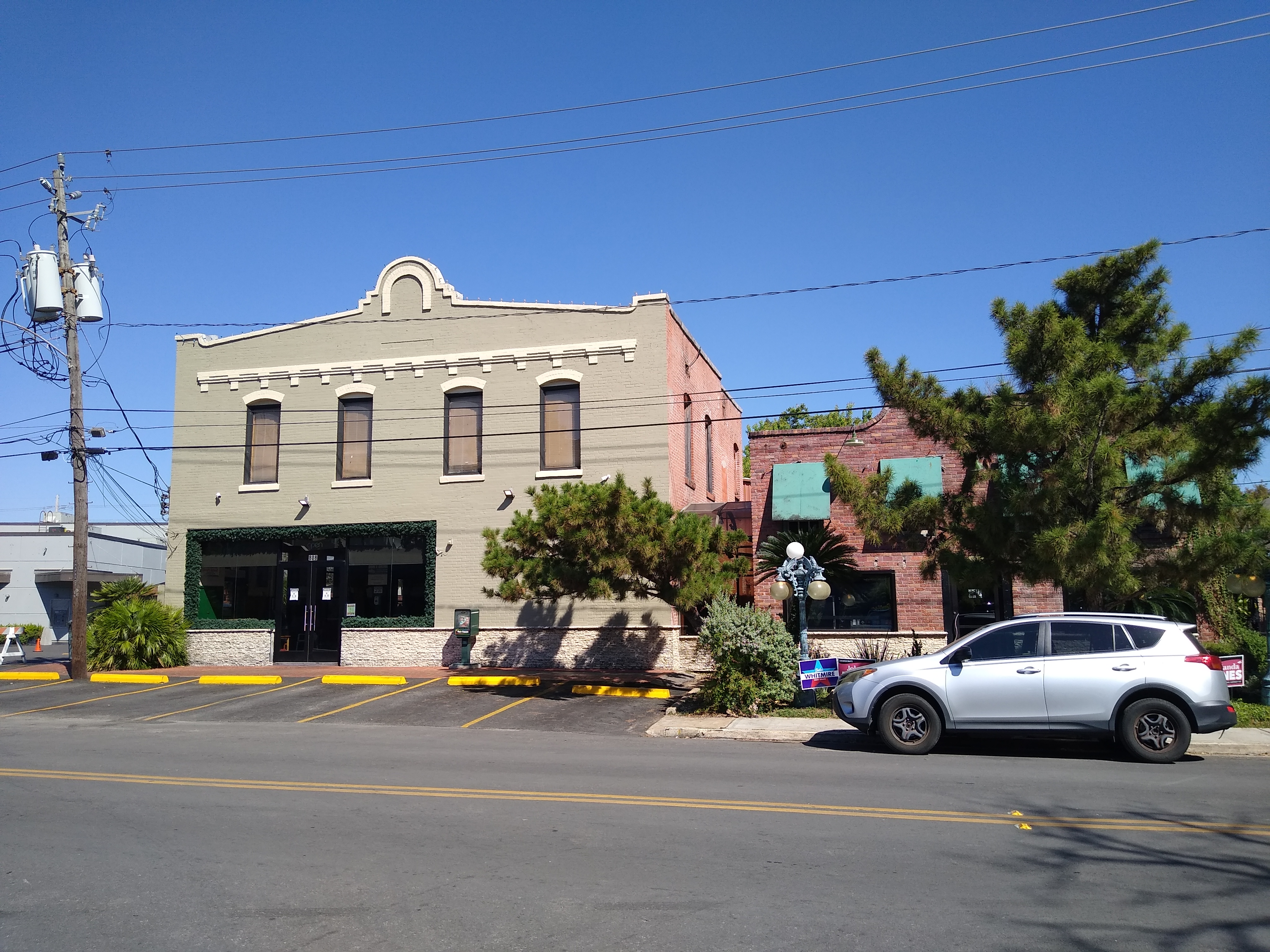
- The 808 and 804 Pacific Buildings, left to right
- Interactive map of JR's Bar and Grill
- Address: 804/808 Pacific Street; Houston, Texas; United States
- Coordinates: 29.7468°N 95.3902°W

Website
- jrsbarandgrill.com

JR's Bar and Grill is a gay bar in Neartown, Houston, in the U.S. state of Texas. Charles Armstrong is the owner.

== Description ==
In an overview of the city's gay landmarks, Joey Guerra of the Houston Chronicle said JR's hosts dancers, drag performances, and karaoke and wrote, "It's a no-fuss place to congregate". Drag shows included Que Calor featuring Latin queens on Mondays, Charlie's Angels on Tuesdays, Millennial Dolls on Wednesdays, the amateur event So You Think You Can Drag on Thursdays, and The Super Sunday Show, as of 2020. Xtra Magazine's offers the following description of the bar: "very popular, hot young professional crowd, heart of gay Houston, karaoke, martinis, drag shows, amateur strippers and go-go boys".

== History ==
Jr's was established in the late 1970s or 1980s. The bar has hosted and supported the Montrose Makers Market. JR's operates on Thanksgiving and Christmas.

== Reception ==
Clint Hale included JR's in the Houston Press's 2017 list of the ten best bars in Montrose. The bar was also named readers' choice for the city's best gay bar in 2019 and 2020. In 2018, JR's ranked number 40 in a list of the nation's most popular gay bars, based on attendance estimates for the last quarter of 2017.

In Eater Houston's 2019 and 2020 lists of the city's "essential LGBT bars", Baylea Jones wrote, "JRs is a laid back neighborhood bar. The expansive space accommodates drag shows, karaoke, and RuPaul’s Drag Race watch parties. Outside is a scenic courtyard patio complete with a fountain and water misters for sultry summer days." JR's was a finalist in the 'Best Drag Show Bar', 'Favorite Bar to Shoot Pool', and 'Favorite Community Bar' categories in OutSmart's 2019 "Gayest & Greatest" list. JR's was a finalist in the following categories for the magazine's 2020 Readers’ Choice Awards: Best Drag-Show Bar, Favorite Community Bar, Favorite Men’s Bar, Favorite Place to Watch Male Dancers, Club or Restaurant with the Best Happy Hour, Club or Restaurant with the Best Martini; the bar won in the Favorite Bar to Shoot Pool category.

In Thrillist's 2020 overview of "Houston’s Most Important LGBTQ Bars", Kathryn Way wrote, "Established in 1978, J...; when people come to town and want to visit a gay bar, they go to JR’s."
