= One Night Only, Part 1 =

- RuPaul's Drag Race episode
- Episode no.: Season 15; Episode 1
- Presented by: RuPaul
- Original air date: January 6, 2023

Guest appearances
- Ariana Grande; Vivacious

Episode chronology
← Previous "Grand Finale"	Next → "One Night Only, Part 2"
- RuPaul's Drag Race season 15

"One Night Only, Part 1" is the first episode of the fifteenth season of the American television series RuPaul's Drag Race. It originally aired on January 6, 2023. American singer Ariana Grande and former contestant Vivacious are special guests. The episode sees two groups of eight contestants participate in separate photo shoots and release choreography for the season's first main challenge.

== Episode ==
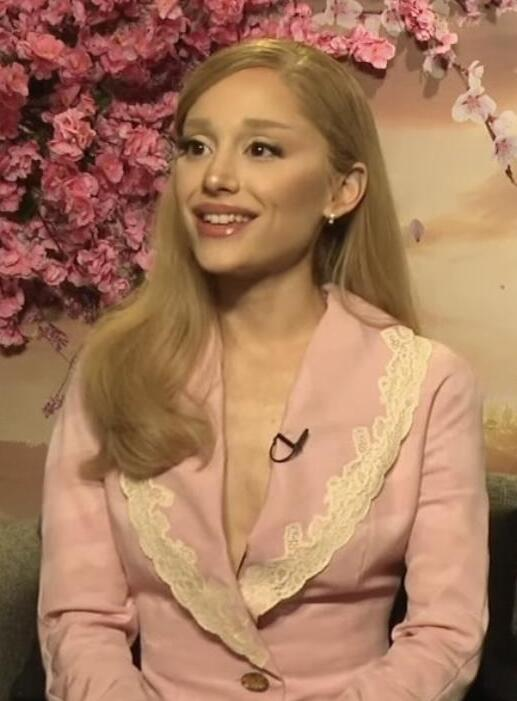
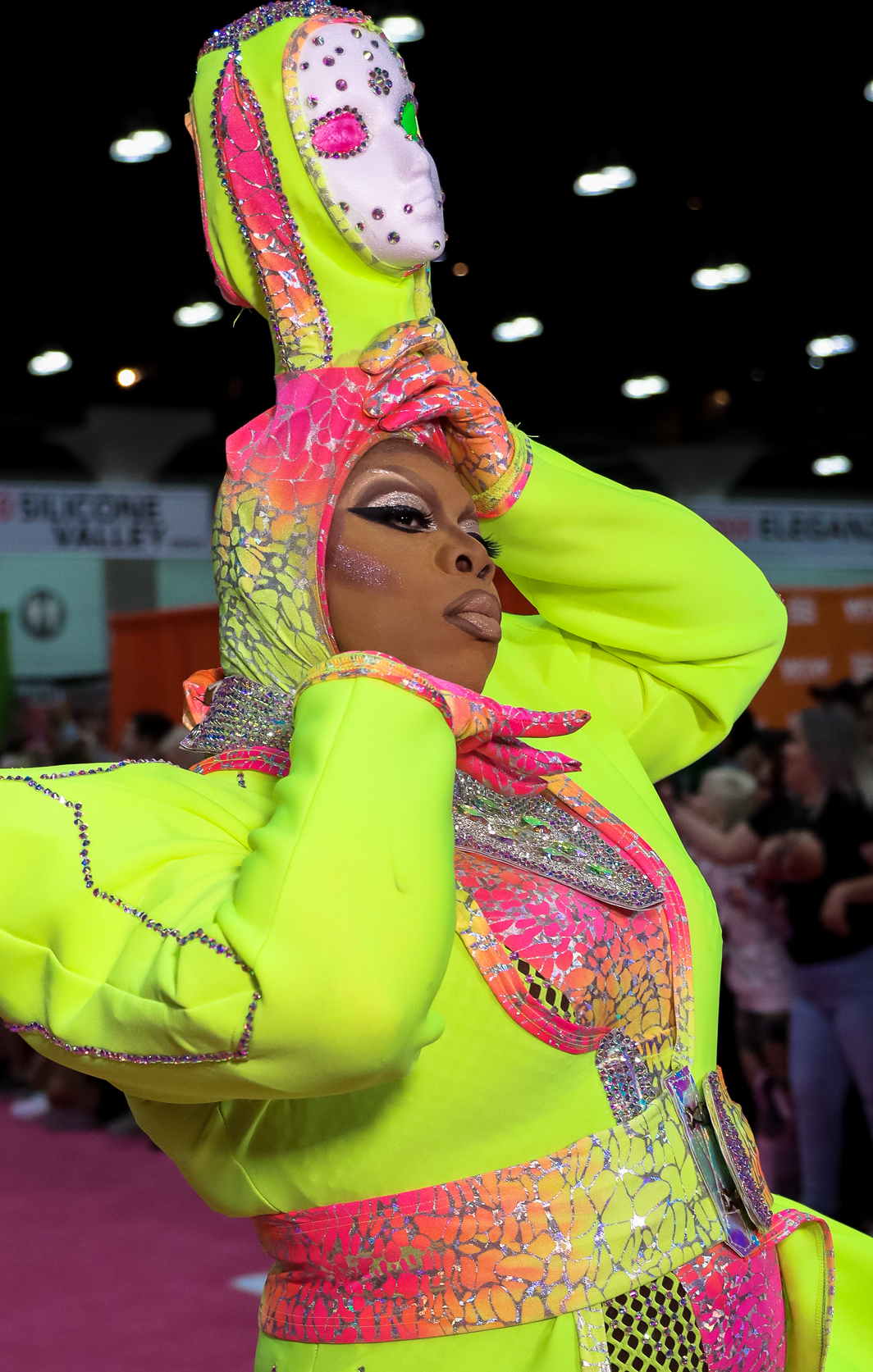
Ariana Grande (top, pictured in 2024) and Vicacious (bottom, pictured at RuPaul's DragCon LA in 2023) are special guests.

The season's first eight contestants—Irene Dubois, Luxx Noir London, Aura Mayari, Marcia Marcia Marcia, Anetra, Malaysia Babydoll Foxx, Princess Poppy, and Sasha Colby—enter the Werk Room one at a time. Ariana Grande enters wearing Vivacious's entrance look on the sixth season, nicknamed "Ornacia", and speaks with the group. RuPaul enters and reveals the mini-challenge, which tasks the contestants with participating in a car wash-themed photo shoot that pays homage to the first mini-challenge of the first season. Albert Sanchez is the photographer. After the photo shoot, the contestants return to the Werk Room and get out of drag. RuPaul returns and declares Irene Dubois the winner of the mini-challenge. RuPaul then reveals the season's first main challenge, which tasks the contestants with performing choreography in the show "One Night Only". The contestants rehearse choreography on the main stage.

Meanwhile, the next eight contestants—Salina EsTitties, Amethyst, Jax, Loosey LaDuca, Mistress Isabelle Brooks, Robin Fierce, and Sugar and Spice—enter the Werk Room. Vivacious enters in the same outfit Grande previously wore. RuPaul enters and reveals the mini-challenge, which tasks the contestants with participating in a motorcycle-riding themed photo shoot that pays homage to the first mini-challenge of the second season. After the photo shoot with Sanchez, the contestants return to the Werk Room and get out of drag. RuPaul returns and reveals the main challenge. The contestants rehearse choreography on the main stage, then return to the Werk Room. RuPaul declares Loosey LaDuca the winner of the mini-challenge. RuPaul then brings the two groups together and announces that, unlike in the premieres of recent seasons, there will be an elimination.

== Production and broadcast ==
The episode originally aired on January 6, 2023. Four members of the Pit Crew, including Bruno Alcantara, participate in the mini-challenge photo shoots.

=== Fashion ===
RuPaul wears a black-and-green suit. For her entrance look, Irene Dubois wears a colorful outfit with spikes and a red wig. Luxx Noir London has a black-and-white outfit and a long dark wig. Auya Mayari wears a black outfit and a long blonde wig. Marcia Marcia Marcia has a Jan Brady-inspired plaid outfit with a purple polo neck, tall white stockings, purple high-heeled shoes, and a blonde wig. She wears a bandage across her nose, referencing Jan Brady being hit by a football in an episode of The Brady Bunch. Anetra has a black-and-yellow outfit and a headpiece with spikes. Malaysia Babydoll Foxx wears an orange-and-white outfit and an orange wig. Princess Poppy has a short white dress that resembles a paint board, matching high-heels, and a blonde wig. Sasha Colby wears a black-and-tan outfit and a large brown wig.

Salina EsTitties wears a colorful outfit, black-and-white footwear, large hoop earrings, and a large brown wig. Amethyst has sunglasses, a microphone, and a long blonde wig. Jax wears a green-and-white cheerleading-inspired outfit and a large red wig. Loosey LaDuca has a blue-and-pink outfit and a large blonde wig. Mistress Isabelle Brooks wears a black outfit and a blonde-and-brown wig. Robin Fierce has a brown outfit, high-heels with an animal print, and a black wig. Sugar and Spice have similar asymmetrical outfits with different colors. Both carry purses and have long wigs.

== Reception ==
Trae DeLellis of The A.V. Club gave the episode a rating of 'A'. Jason P. Frank of Vulture rated the episode four out of five stars.

== See also ==
- Ariana Grande videography
