= List of RuPaul's Drag Race contestants =

RuPaul's Drag Race is an American reality competition television series where drag queen RuPaul, as host and head judge, is in search of the "Next Drag Superstar" for the United States. It first broadcast in 2009 with eighteen complete seasons aired. During each season, drag performers apply to compete against each other through unique challenges. Based on the critiques given from the judges, they are progressively eliminated via a lip-sync contest, until only a few contenders remain. The selected finalists participate in a last episode from which a winner is determined to be given the title and any monetary prizes.

Since its eighteenth season, 242 contestants were selected by production and have competed so far. The eighteen winners of the series, in chronological order, are BeBe Zahara Benet, Tyra Sanchez, Raja Gemini, Sharon Needles, Jinkx Monsoon, Bianca Del Rio, Violet Chachki, Bob the Drag Queen, Sasha Velour, Aquaria, Yvie Oddly, Jaida Essence Hall, Symone, Willow Pill, Sasha Colby, Nymphia Wind, Onya Nurve, and Myki Meeks. As of 2024, five of those winners had represented for their hometown: New York City, New York.

Eureka O'Hara and Kornbread Jeté were the only competitors who withdrew from the competition due to medical reasons. Shangela, Cynthia Lee Fontaine, Eureka O'Hara, and Vanessa Vanjie Mateo were eliminated in their previous seasons, but soon returned again from their following seasons at the invitation of RuPaul. Willam and Sherry Pie were the only competitors to be disqualified.

== Winners ==
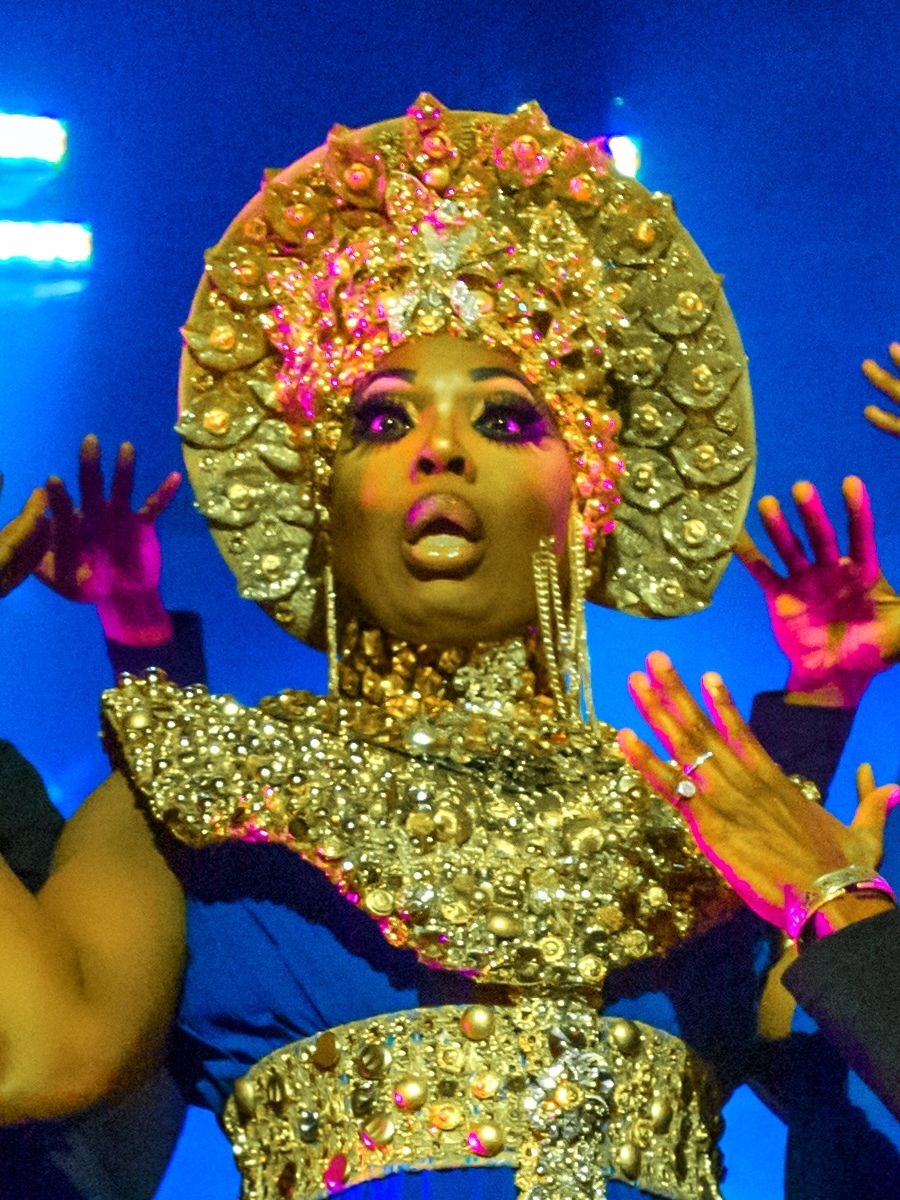
Season 1 winner
BeBe Zahara Benet

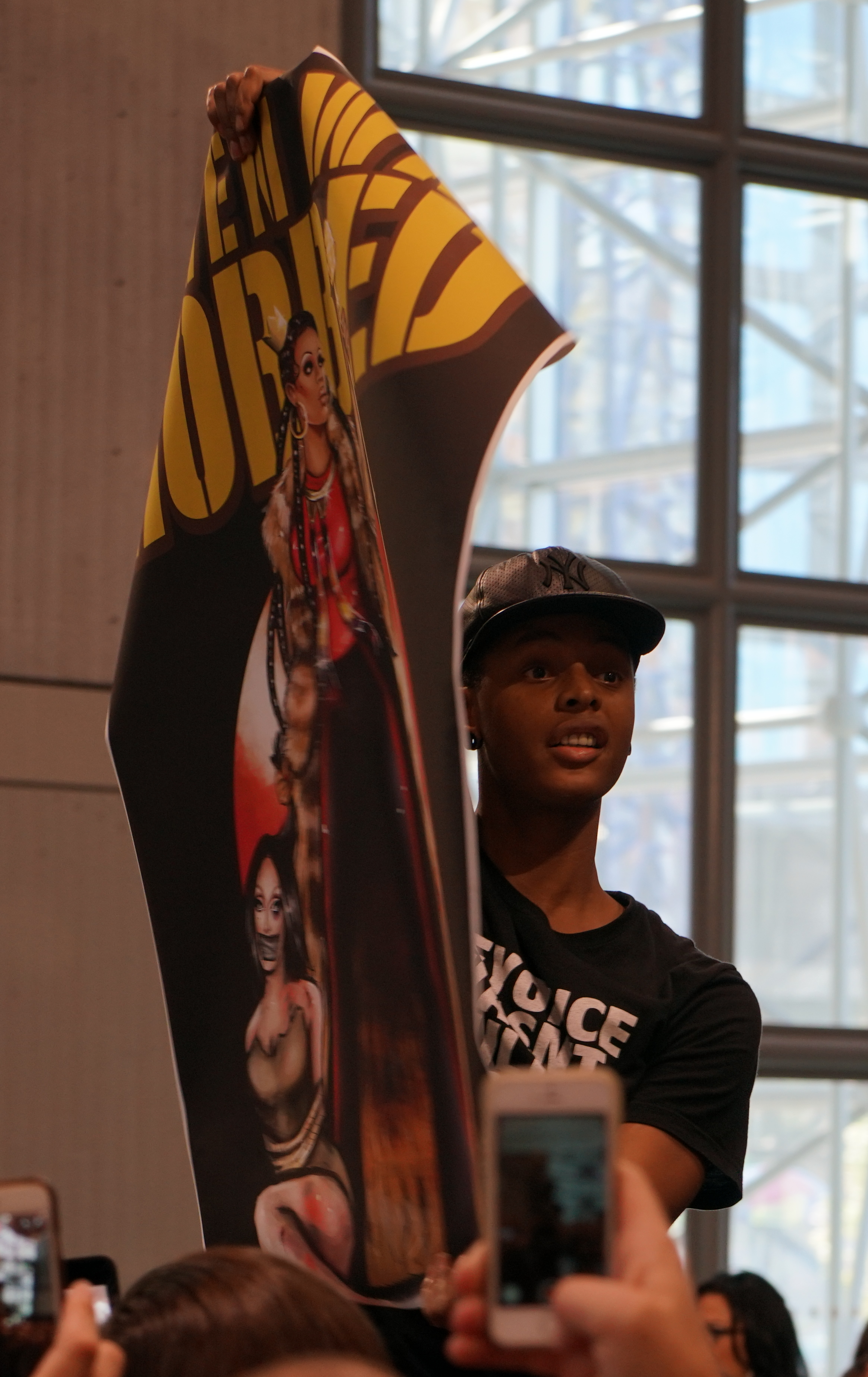
Season 2 winner
Tyra Sanchez

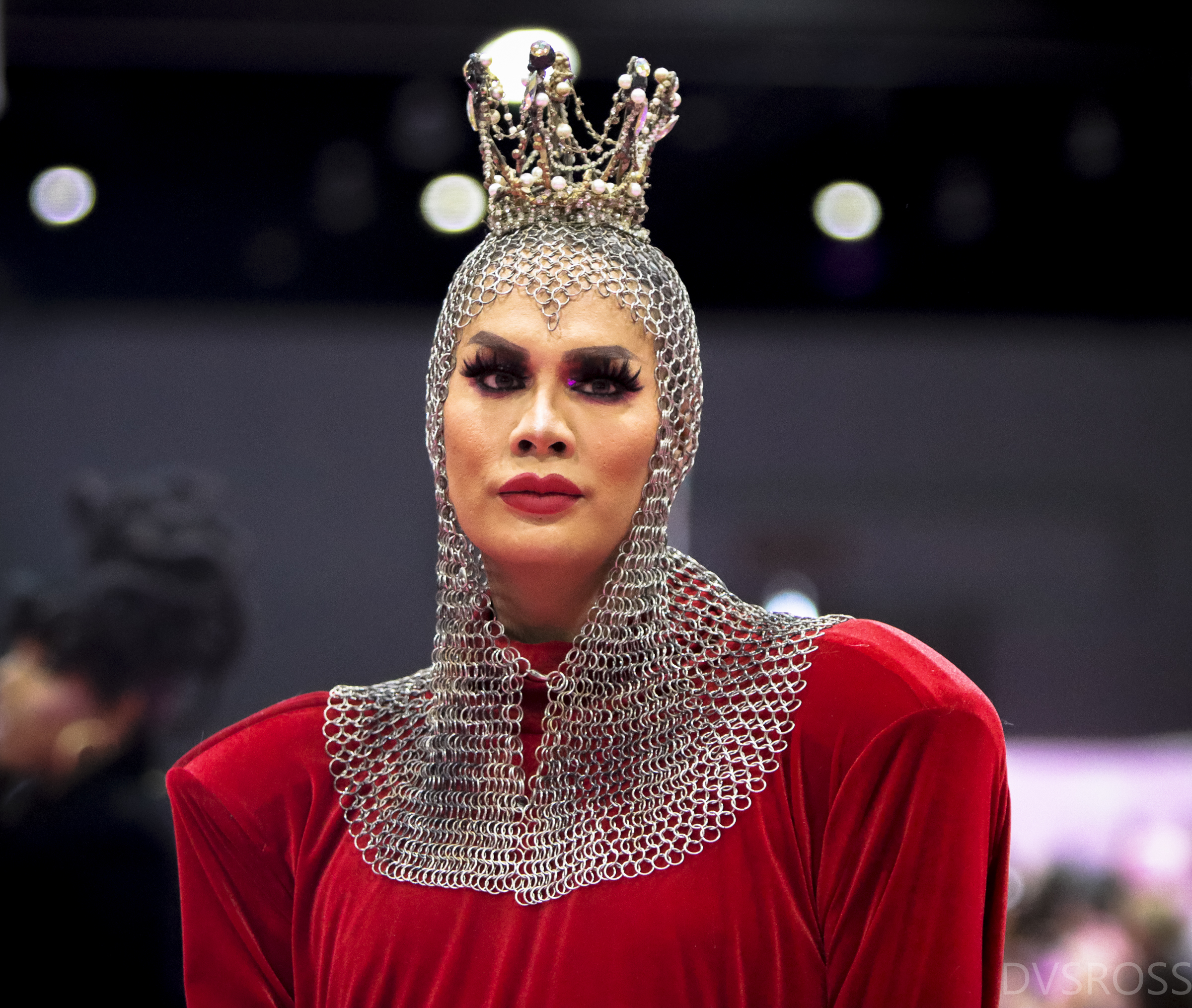
Season 3 winner
Raja

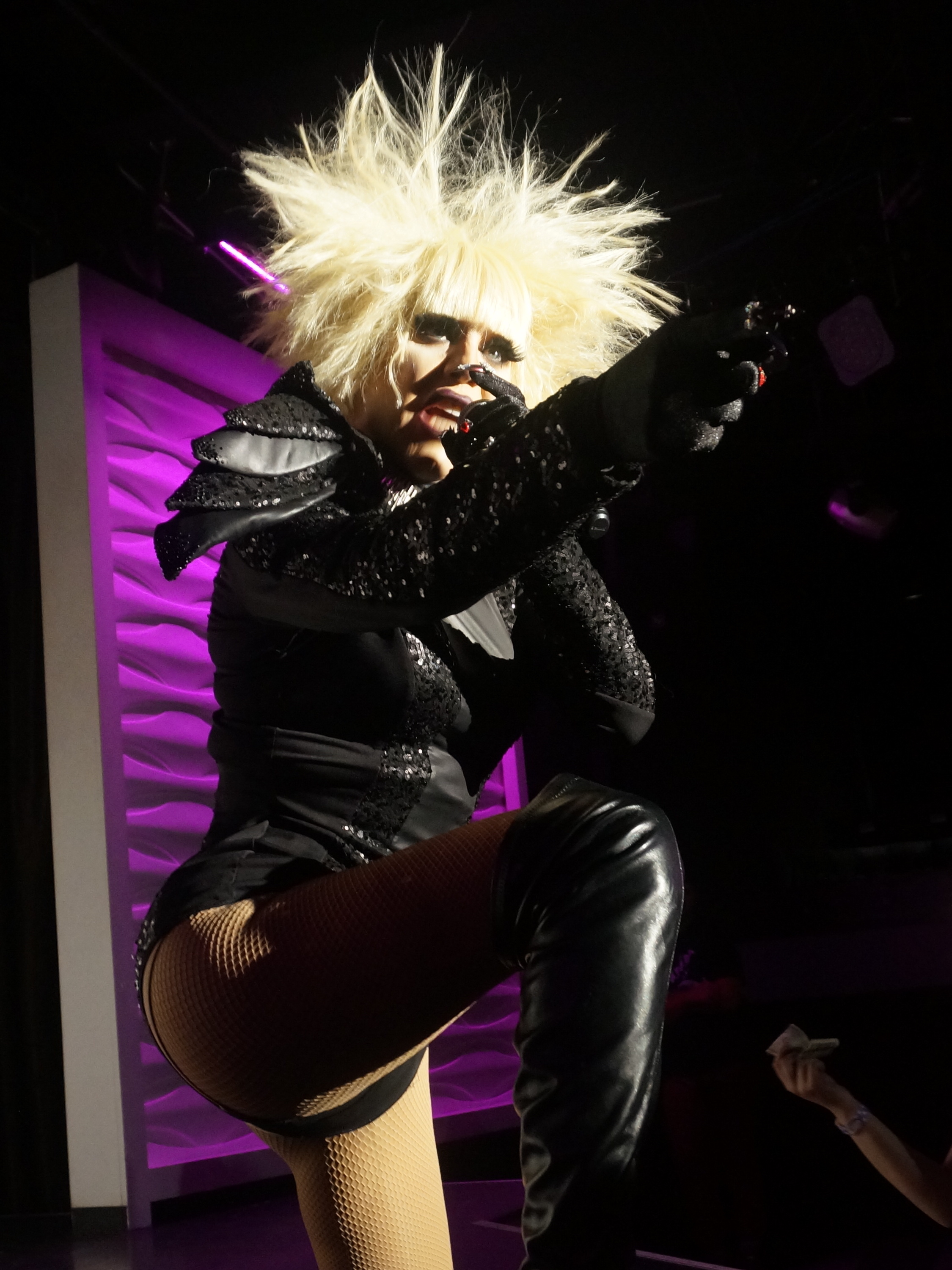
Season 4 winner
Sharon Needles

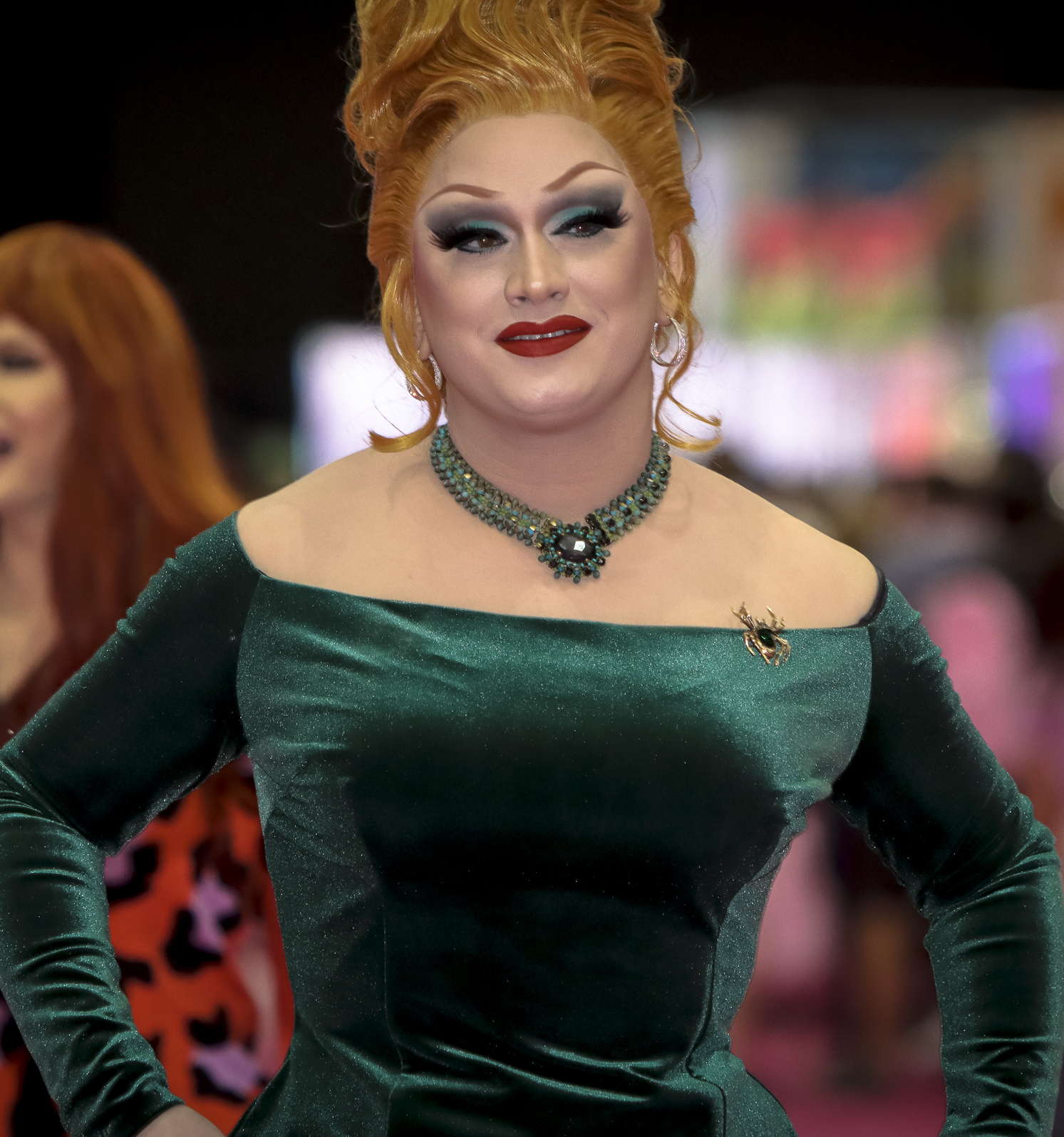
Season 5 winner
Jinkx Monsoon

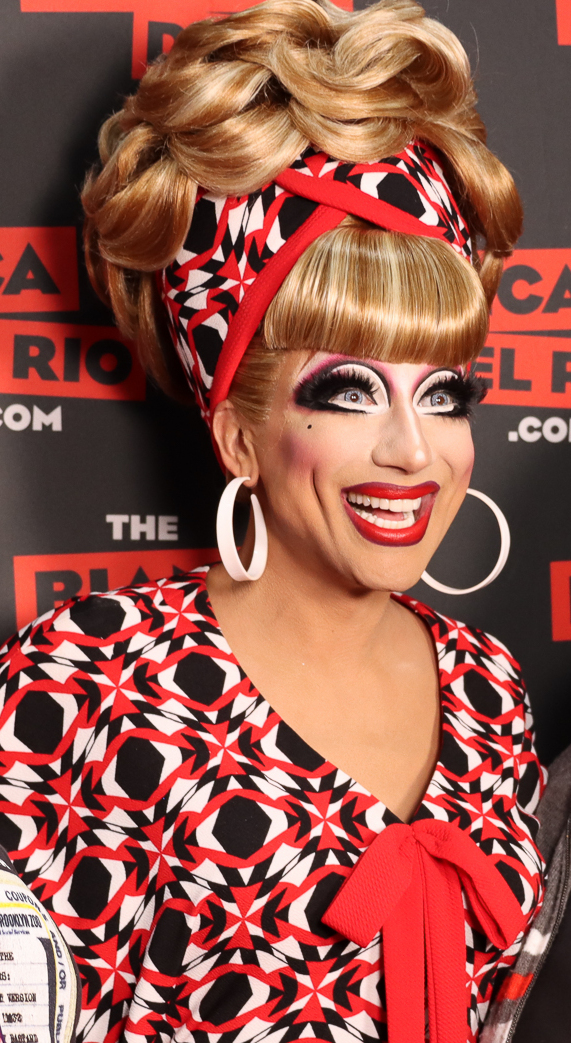
Season 6 winner
Bianca Del Rio

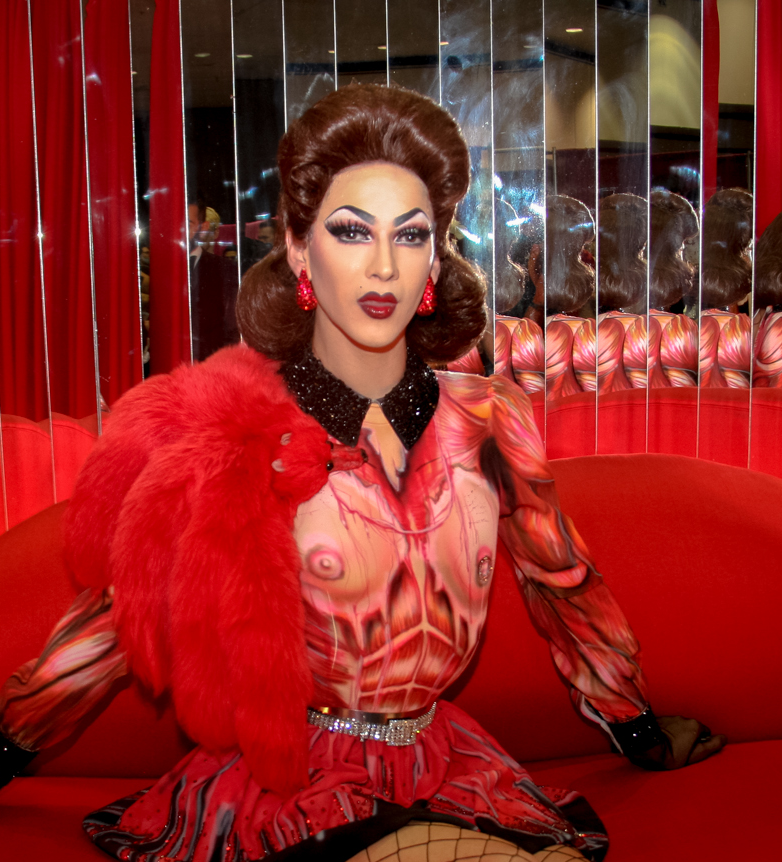
Season 7 winner
Violet Chachki

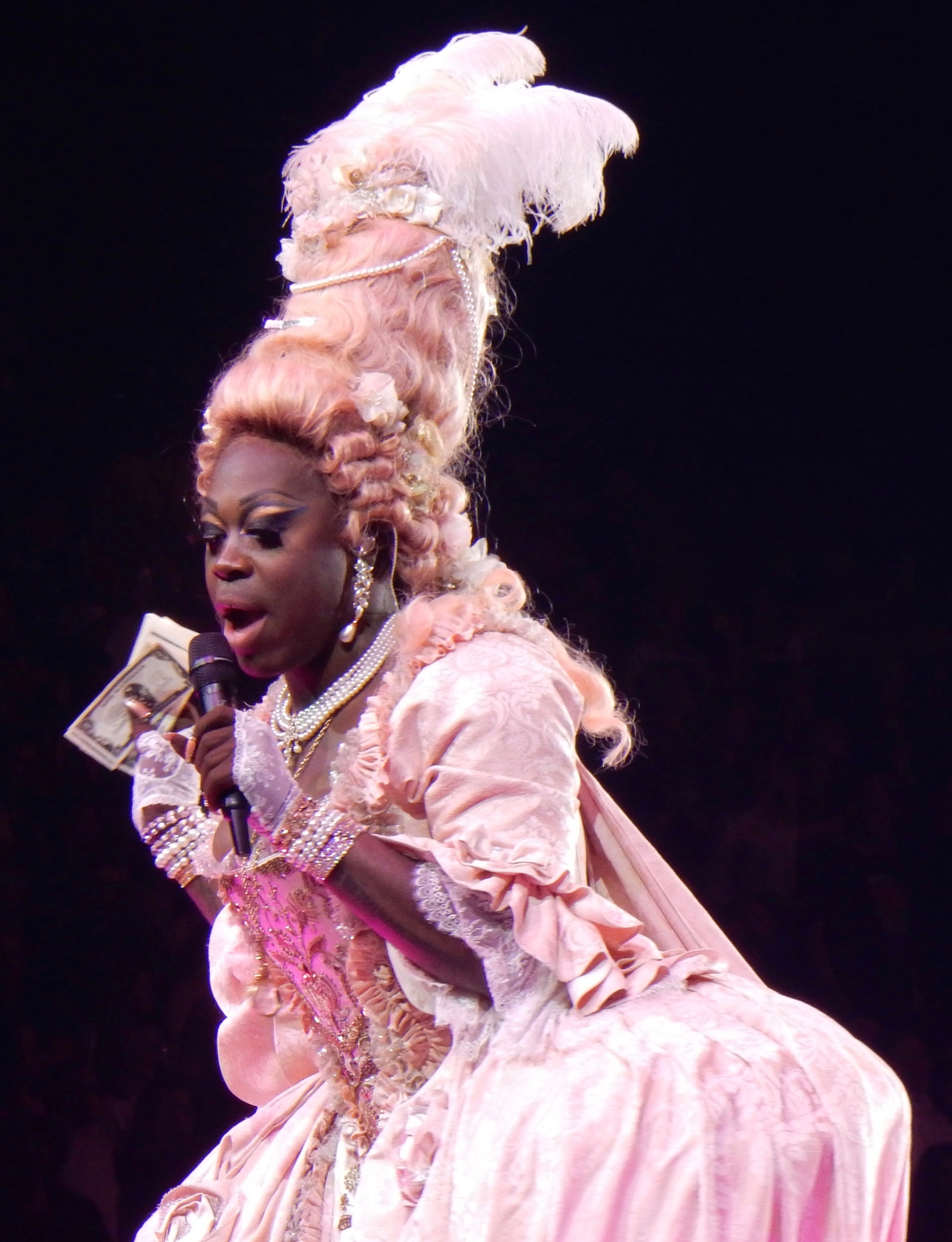
Season 8 winner
Bob the Drag Queen

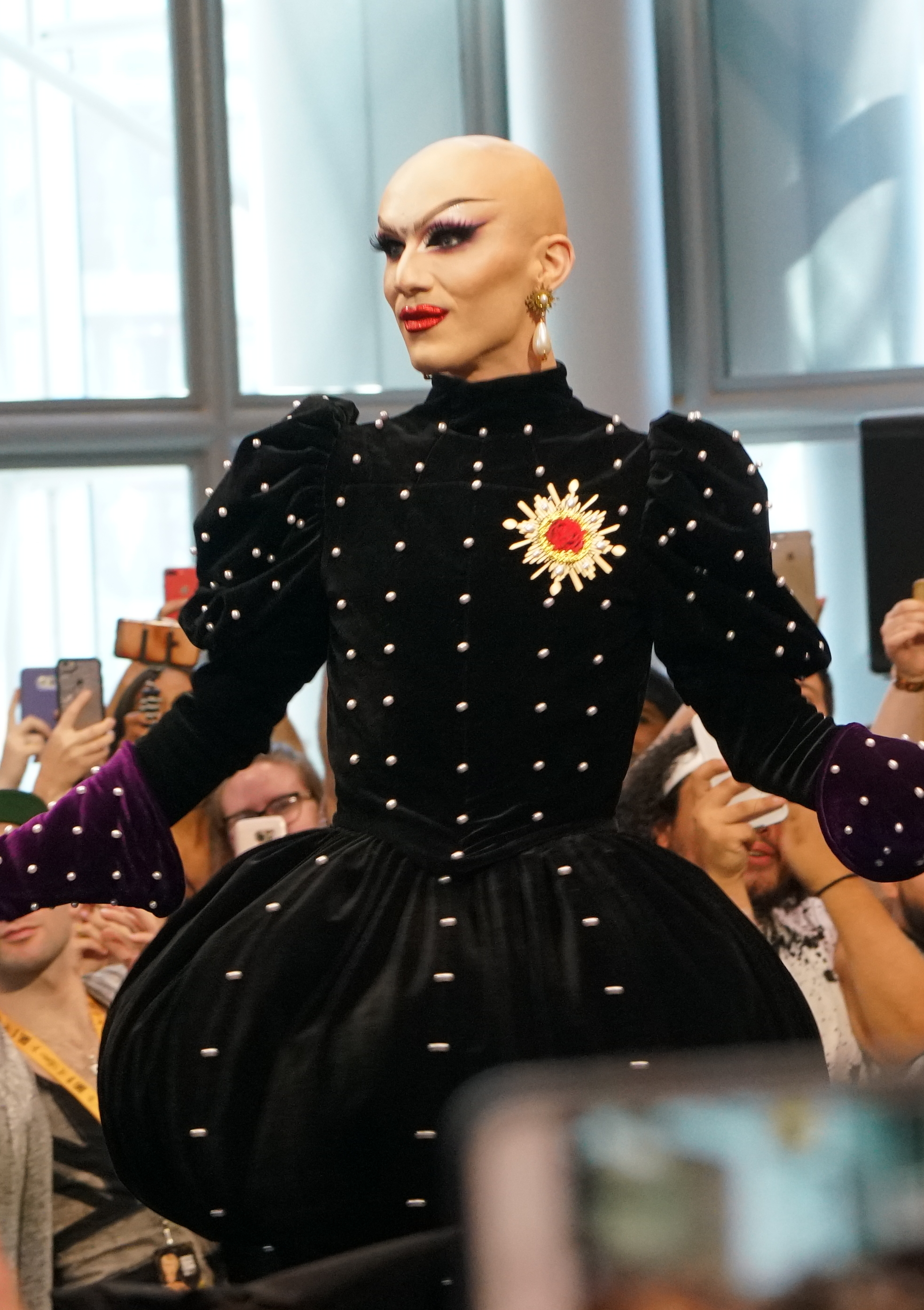
Season 9 winner
Sasha Velour

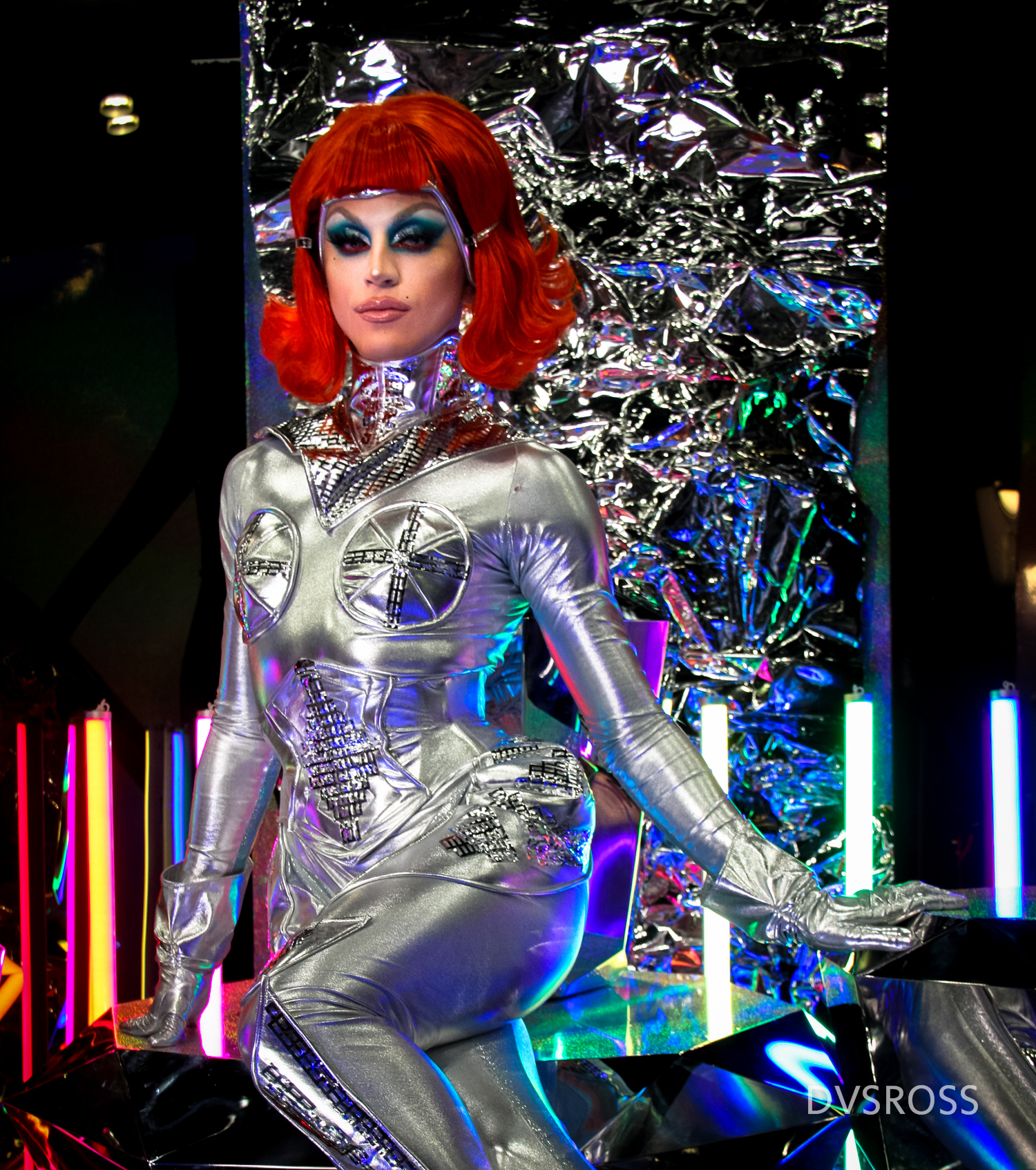
Season 10 winner
Aquaria

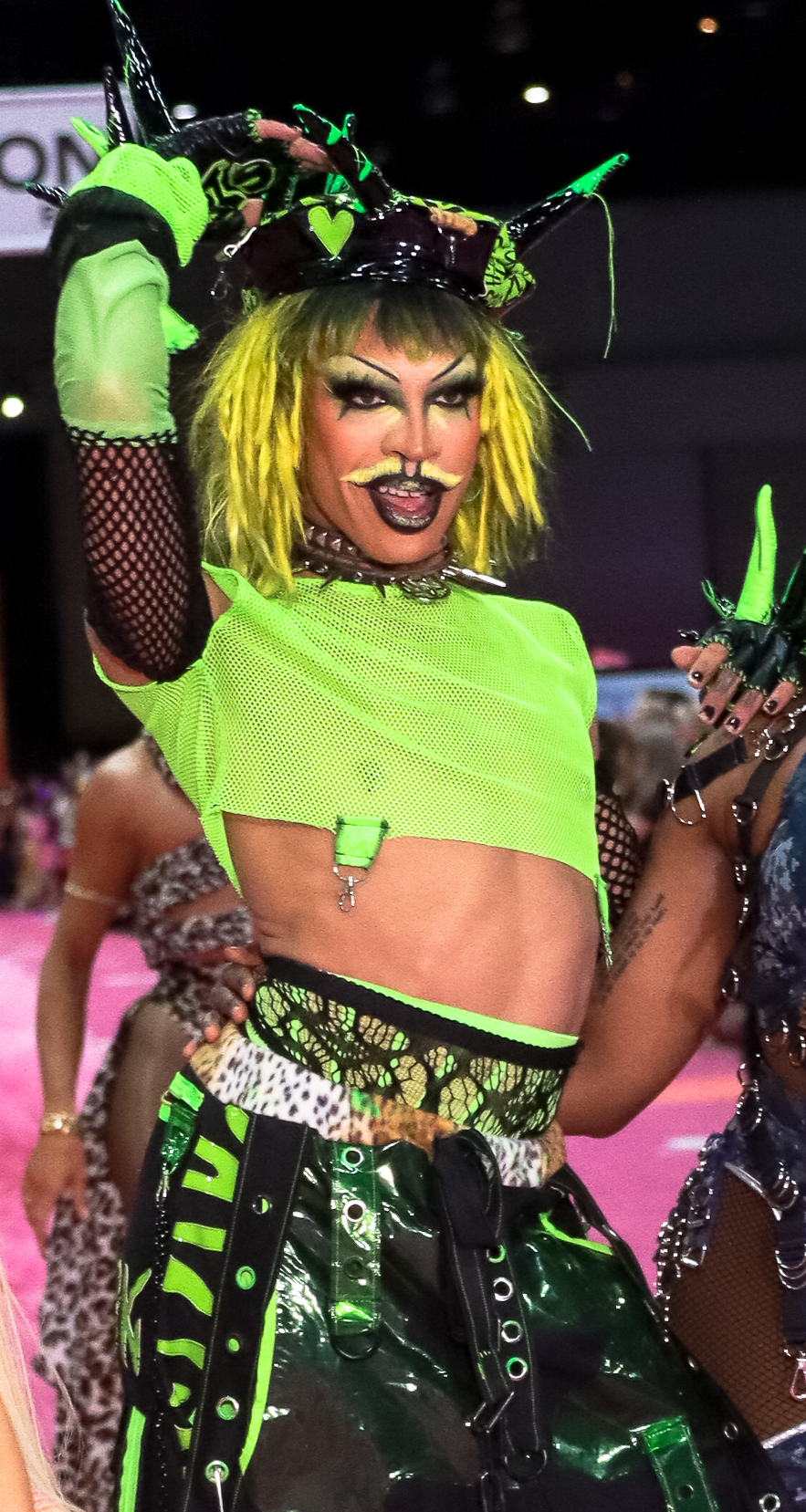
Season 11 winner
Yvie Oddly

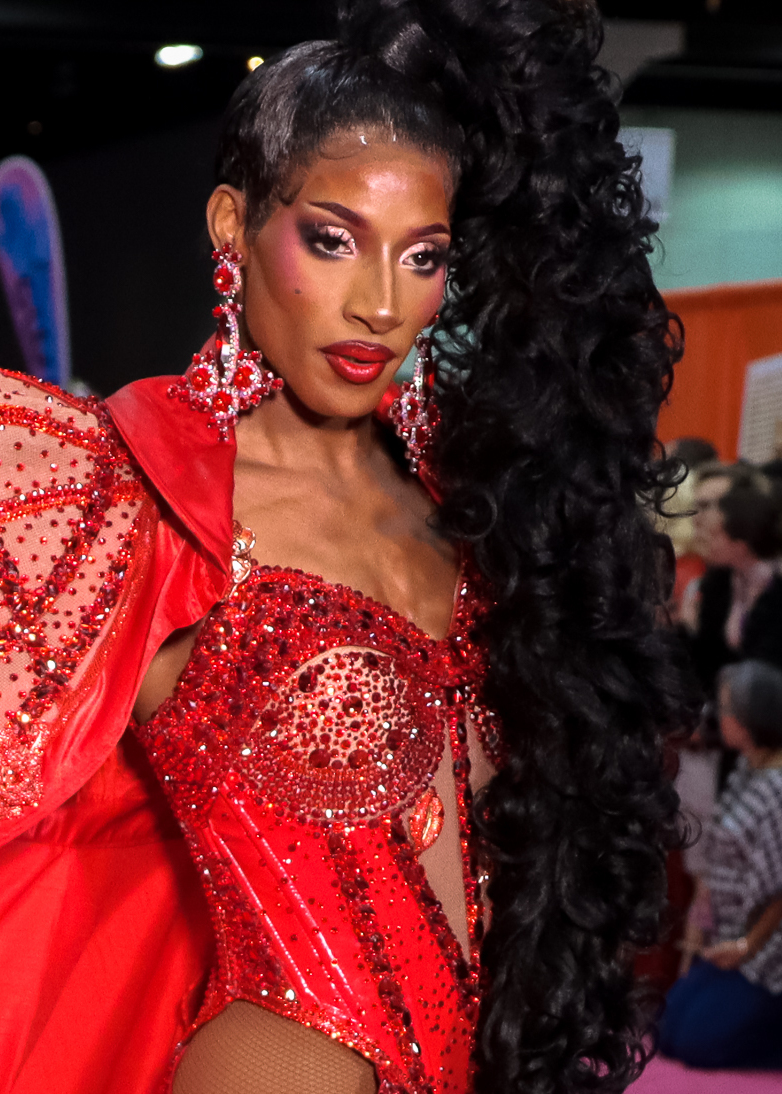
Season 12 winner
Jaida Essence Hall

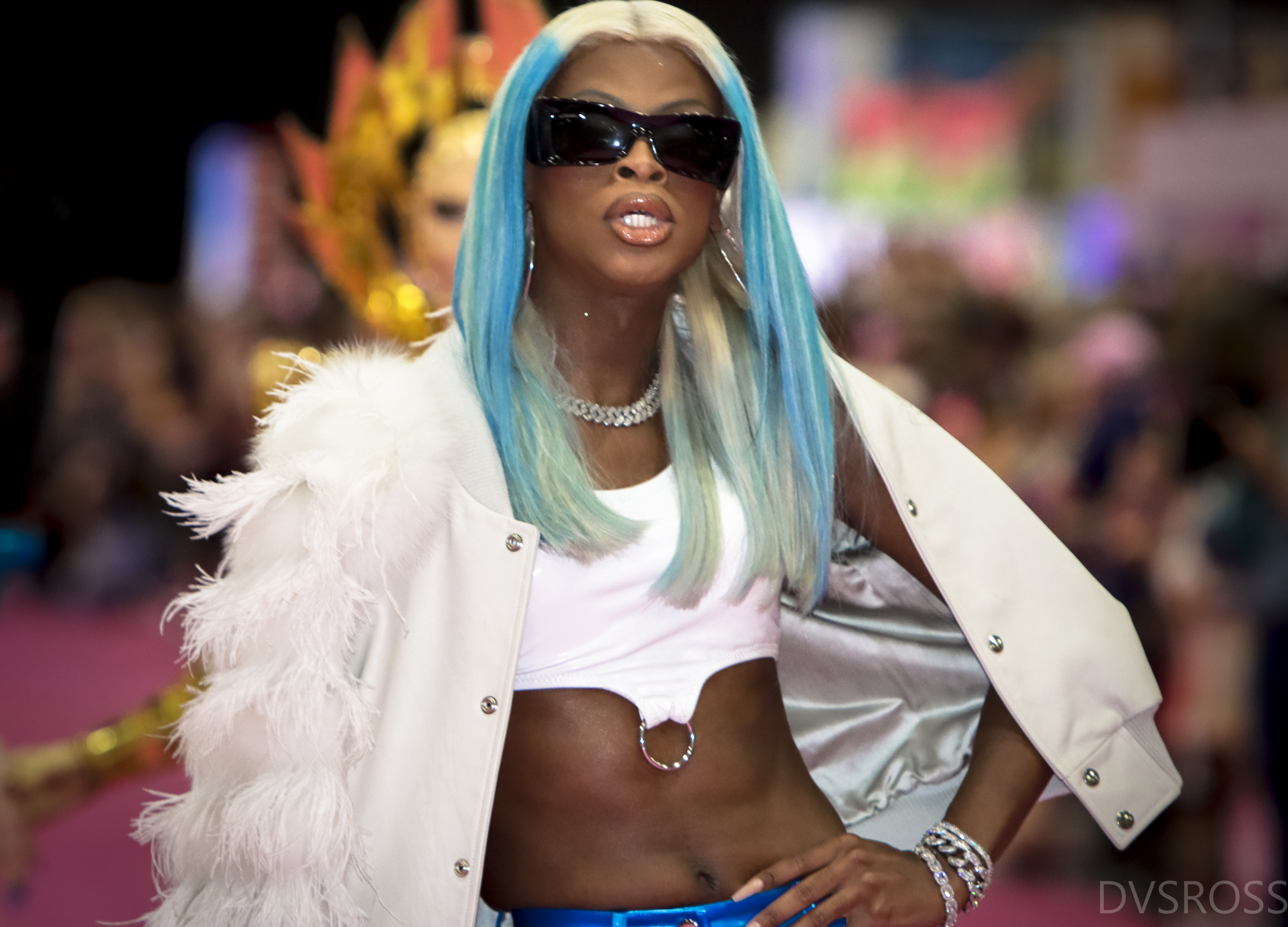
Season 13 winner
Symone

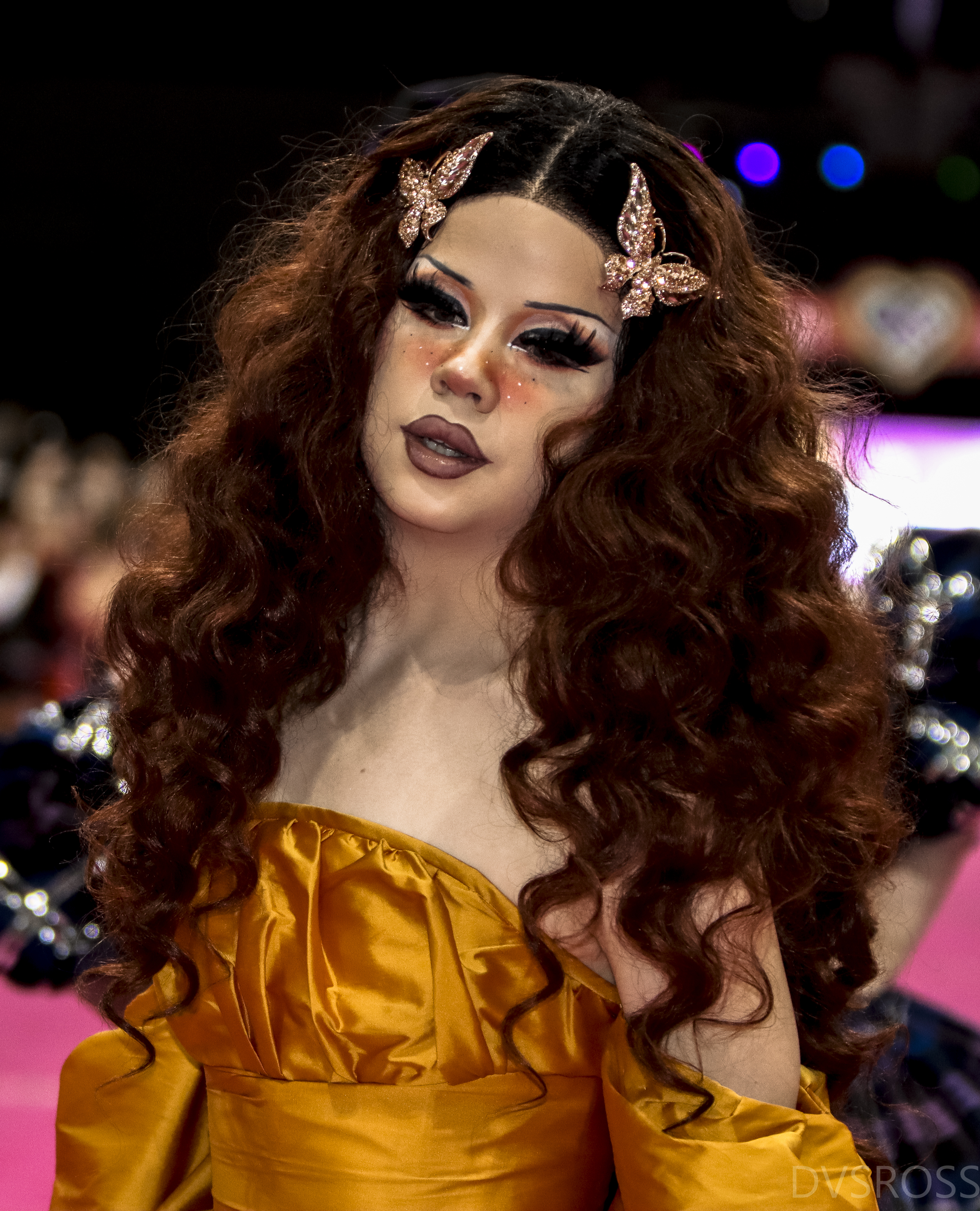
Season 14 winner
Willow Pill

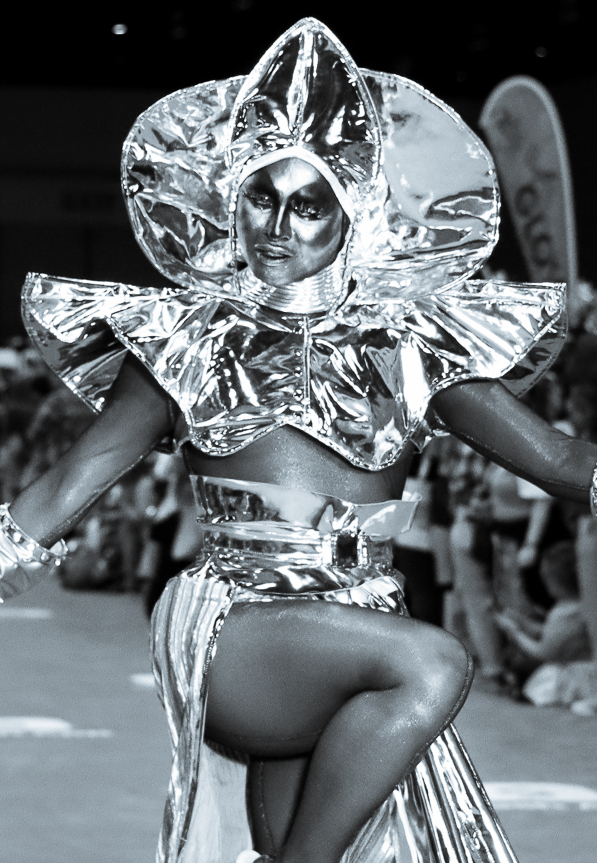
Season 15 winner
Sasha Colby

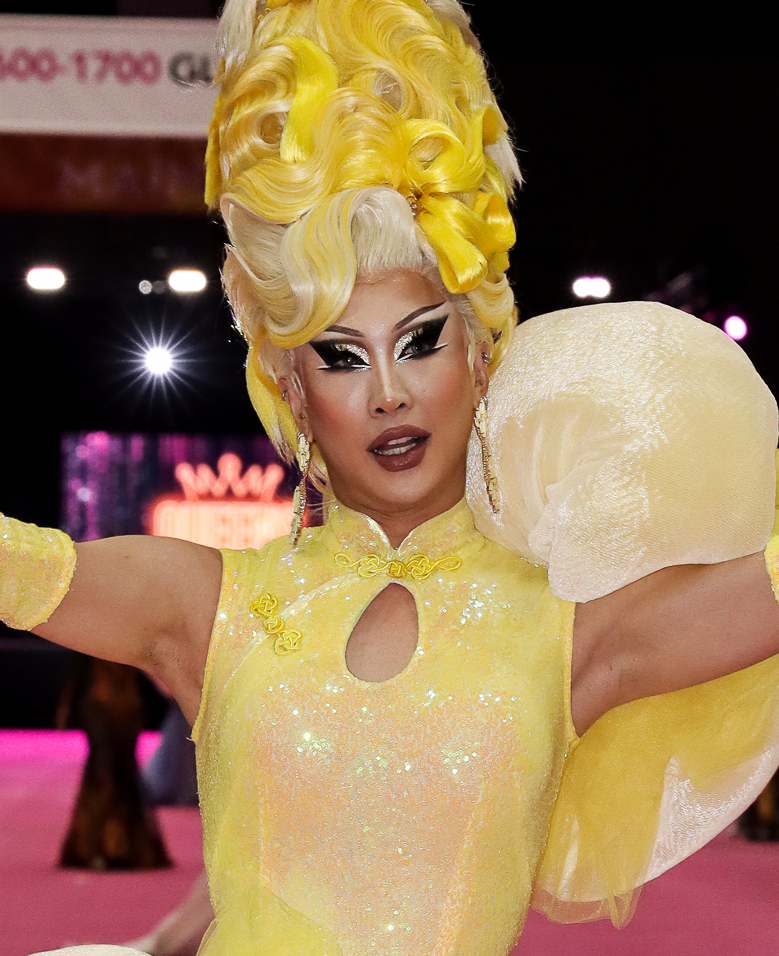
Season 16 winner
Nymphia Wind

== Contestants ==
Legend:
	Contestant won the season.
	Contestant was saved from elimination.
	Contestant returned to competition after being eliminated during the season.
	Contestant returned to competition after being eliminated in previous season.
	Contestant was voted as Miss Congeniality of the season.
†	Indicates that the contestant is deceased.

RuPaul's Drag Race contestants and their backgrounds (Note: All ages, names, with hometowns, and outcome are stated at time of filming.)
Season	Contestant	Age	Hometown	Outcome
1	BeBe Zahara Benet	28	Minneapolis, Minnesota	Winner
1	Nina Flowers	34	Denver, Colorado	Runner-up
1	Rebecca Glasscock	26	Fort Lauderdale, Florida	3rd
1	Shannel	29	Las Vegas, Nevada	4th
1	Ongina	26	Los Angeles, California	5th
1	Jade (Note: Jade Sotomayor is referred to as Jade on season 1.)	25	Chicago, Illinois	6th
1	Akashia	24	Cleveland, Ohio	7th
1	Tammie Brown	28	Long Beach, California	8th
1	Victoria "Porkchop" Parker	39	Raleigh, North Carolina	9th
2	Tyra Sanchez	21	Orlando, Florida	Winner
2	Raven	30	Riverside, California	Runner-up
2	Jujubee	25	Boston, Massachusetts	3rd
2	Tatianna	21	Falls Church, Virginia	4th
2	Pandora Boxx	37	Rochester, New York	5th
2	Jessica Wild	29	San Juan, Puerto Rico	6th
2	Sahara Davenport†	25	New York City, New York	7th
2	Morgan McMichaels	28	Mira Loma, California	8th
2	Sonique (Note: Kylie Sonique Love is referred to as Sonique on season 2.)	26	Atlanta, Georgia	9th
2	Mystique Summers Madison	25	Bedford, Texas	10th
2	Nicole Paige Brooks	36	Atlanta, Georgia	11th
2	Shangela Laquifa Wadley (Note: Shangela is referred to as Shangela Laquifa Wadley on season 2.)	28	Paris, Texas	12th
3	Raja (Note: Raja Gemini is referred to as Raja on season 3.)	36	Los Angeles, California	Winner
3	Manila Luzon	28	New York City, New York	Runner-up
3	Alexis Mateo	30	St. Petersburg, Florida	3rd
3	Yara Sofia	26	Manatí, Puerto Rico	4th
3	Carmen Carrera	25	Elmwood Park, New Jersey	5th (Note: Carmen Carrera originally placed sixth before re-entering the competition.)
3	Shangela	29	Los Angeles, California	6th
3	Delta Work	34	Norwalk, California	7th
3	Stacy Layne Matthews	25	Back Swamp, North Carolina	8th
3	Mariah (Note: Mariah Paris Balenciaga is referred to as Mariah on season 3.)	29	Atlanta, Georgia	9th
3	India Ferrah	23	Dayton, Ohio	10th
3	Mimi Imfurst	27	New York City, New York	11th
3	Phoenix	29	Atlanta, Georgia	12th
3	Venus D-Lite	26	Los Angeles, California	13th
4	Sharon Needles	29	Pittsburgh, Pennsylvania	Winner
4	Chad Michaels	40	San Diego, California	Runners-up
4	Phi Phi O'Hara	25	Chicago, Illinois	Runners-up
4	Latrice Royale	39	South Beach, Florida	4th
4	Kenya Michaels	21	Dorado, Puerto Rico	5th (Note: Kenya Michaels originally placed eighth before re-entering the competition.)
4	DiDa Ritz	25	Chicago, Illinois	6th
4	Willam	29	Los Angeles, California	Disqualified (Note: Willam was disqualified during filming due to breaching the contract agreement.)
4	Jiggly Caliente†	30	New York City, New York	8th
4	Milan	36	New York City, New York	9th
4	Madame LaQueer	29	Carolina, Puerto Rico	10th
4	The Princess	32	Chicago, Illinois	11th
4	Lashauwn Beyond	21	Fort Lauderdale, Florida	12th
4	Alisa Summers	23	Tampa, Florida	13th
5	Jinkx Monsoon	24	Seattle, Washington	Winner
5	Alaska	27	Pittsburgh, Pennsylvania	Runners-up
5	Roxxxy Andrews	28	Orlando, Florida	Runners-up
5	Detox	27	Los Angeles, California	4th
5	Coco Montrese	37	Las Vegas, Nevada	5th
5	Alyssa Edwards	32	Mesquite, Texas	6th
5	Ivy Winters	26	New York City, New York	7th
5	Jade Jolie	25	Gainesville, Florida	8th
5	Lineysha Sparx	24	San Juan, Puerto Rico	9th
5	Honey Mahogany	29	San Francisco, California	10th
5	Vivienne Pinay	26	New York City, New York	10th
5	Monica Beverly Hillz	27	Owensboro, Kentucky	12th
5	Serena ChaCha	21	Tallahassee, Florida	13th
5	Penny Tration	39	Cincinnati, Ohio	14th
6	Bianca Del Rio	37	New York City, New York	Winner
6	Adore Delano	23	Azusa, California	Runners-up
6	Courtney Act	31	West Hollywood, California	Runners-up
6	Darienne Lake	41	Rochester, New York	4th
6	BenDeLaCreme	31	Seattle, Washington	5th
6	Joslyn Fox	26	Worcester, Massachusetts	6th
6	Trinity K. Bonet	22	Atlanta, Georgia	7th
6	Laganja Estranja	24	Los Angeles, California	8th
6	Milk	25	New York City, New York	9th
6	Gia Gunn	23	Chicago, Illinois	10th
6	April Carrión	24	Guaynabo, Puerto Rico	11th
6	Vivacious	40	New York City, New York	12th
6	Kelly Mantle	37	Los Angeles, California	13th
6	Magnolia Crawford	27	Seattle, Washington	13th
7	Violet Chachki	22	Atlanta, Georgia	Winner
7	Ginger Minj	29	Orlando, Florida	Runners-up
7	Pearl	23	New York City, New York	Runners-up
7	Kennedy Davenport	33	Dallas, Texas	4th
7	Katya	32	Boston, Massachusetts	5th
7	Trixie Mattel	26	Milwaukee, Wisconsin	6th (Note: Trixie Mattel originally placed eleventh before re-entering the competition.)
7	Miss Fame	29	New York City, New York	7th
7	Jaidynn Diore Fierce	25	Nashville, Tennessee	8th
7	Max	22	Hudson, Wisconsin	9th
7	Kandy Ho	28	Cayey, Puerto Rico	10th
7	Mrs. Kasha Davis	43	Rochester, New York	11th
7	Jasmine Masters	37	Los Angeles, California	12th
7	Sasha Belle	28	Iowa City, Iowa	13th
7	Tempest DuJour	46	Tucson, Arizona	14th
8	Bob the Drag Queen	29	New York City, New York	Winner
8	Kim Chi	27	Chicago, Illinois	Runners-up
8	Naomi Smalls	21	Redlands, California	Runners-up
8	Chi Chi DeVayne†	30	Shreveport, Louisiana	4th
8	Derrick Barry	32	Las Vegas, Nevada	5th
8	Thorgy Thor	31	New York City, New York	6th
8	Robbie Turner	33	Seattle, Washington	7th
8	Acid Betty	37	New York City, New York	8th
8	Naysha Lopez	31	Chicago, Illinois	9th (Note: Naysha Lopez originally placed twelfth before re-entering the competition.)
8	Cynthia Lee Fontaine	34	Austin, Texas	10th
8	Dax ExclamationPoint	31	Savannah, Georgia	11th
8	Laila McQueen	22	Gloucester, Massachusetts	11th
9	Sasha Velour	29	New York City, New York	Winner
9	Peppermint	37	New York City, New York	Runner-up
9	Shea Couleé	27	Chicago, Illinois	3rd
9	Trinity Taylor (Note: Trinity the Tuck is referred to as Trinity Taylor on season 9.)	31	Orlando, Florida	3rd
9	Alexis Michelle	33	New York City, New York	5th
9	Nina Bo'nina Brown	34	Riverdale, Georgia	6th
9	Valentina	25	Echo Park, California	7th
9	Farrah Moan	23	Las Vegas, Nevada	8th
9	Aja	22	New York City, New York	9th
9	Cynthia Lee Fontaine	34	Austin, Texas	10th
9	Eureka (Note: Eureka O'Hara is referred to as Eureka on seasons 9 and 10.)	25	Johnson City, Tennessee	11th (Note: The contestant was removed from the competition due to medical reasons.)
9	Charlie Hides	52	London, United Kingdom	12th
9	Kimora Blac	28	Las Vegas, Nevada	13th
9	Jaymes Mansfield	26	Milwaukee, Wisconsin	14th
10	Aquaria	21	New York City, New York	Winner
10	Eureka	27	Johnson City, Tennessee	Runner-up
10	Kameron Michaels	31	Nashville, Tennessee	Runner-up
10	Asia O'Hara	35	Dallas, Texas	4th
10	Miz Cracker	33	New York City, New York	5th
10	Monét X Change	27	New York City, New York	6th
10	The Vixen	26	Chicago, Illinois	7th
10	Monique Heart (Note: Mo Heart is referred to as Monique Heart on season 10.)	31	Kansas City, Missouri	8th
10	Blair St. Clair	22	Indianapolis, Indiana	9th
10	Mayhem Miller	35	Riverside, California	10th
10	Dusty Ray Bottoms	29	New York City, New York	11th
10	Yuhua Hamasaki	27	New York City, New York	12th
10	Kalorie Karbdashian-Williams	27	Albuquerque, New Mexico	13th
10	Vanessa Vanjie Mateo	25	Tampa, Florida	14th
11	Yvie Oddly	24	Denver, Colorado	Winner
11	Brooke Lynn Hytes	32	Nashville, Tennessee	Runner-up
11	A'keria C. Davenport	30	Dallas, Texas	3rd
11	Silky Nutmeg Ganache	28	Chicago, Illinois	3rd
11	Vanessa Vanjie Mateo	26	Los Angeles, California	5th
11	Nina West	39	Columbus, Ohio	6th
11	Shuga Cain	40	New York City, New York	7th
11	Plastique Tiara	21	Dallas, Texas	8th
11	Ra'Jah O'Hara	33	Dallas, Texas	9th
11	Scarlet Envy	26	New York City, New York	10th
11	Ariel Versace	26	Cherry Hill, New Jersey	11th
11	Mercedes Iman Diamond	31	Minneapolis, Minnesota	12th
11	Honey Davenport	32	New York City, New York	13th
11	Kahanna Montrese	25	Las Vegas, Nevada	14th
11	Soju	27	Chicago, Illinois	15th
12	Jaida Essence Hall	32	Milwaukee, Wisconsin	Winner
12	Crystal Methyd	28	Springfield, Missouri	Runners-up
12	Gigi Goode	21	Los Angeles, California	Runners-up
12	Sherry Pie	27	New York City, New York	Disqualified (Note: Sherry Pie was disqualified after filming due to catfishing allegations.)
12	Jackie Cox	34	New York City, New York	5th
12	Heidi N Closet	24	Ramseur, North Carolina	6th
12	Widow Von'Du	30	Kansas City, Missouri	7th
12	Jan	26	New York City, New York	8th
12	Brita	34	New York City, New York	9th
12	Aiden Zhane	29	Acworth, Georgia	10th
12	Nicky Doll	28	New York City, New York	11th
12	Rock M. Sakura	28	San Francisco, California	12th
12	Dahlia Sin	28	Los Angeles, California	13th
13	Symone	25	Los Angeles, California	Winner
13	Kandy Muse	25	New York City, New York	Runner-up
13	Gottmik	23	Los Angeles, California	3rd
13	Rosé	31	New York City, New York	3rd
13	Olivia Lux	26	New York City, New York	5th
13	Utica Queen	25	Utica, Minnesota	6th
13	Tina Burner	39	New York City, New York	7th
13	Denali	28	Chicago, Illinois	8th
13	Elliott with 2 Ts	26	Las Vegas, Nevada	9th
13	LaLa Ri	30	Atlanta, Georgia	10th
13	Tamisha Iman	49	Atlanta, Georgia	11th
13	Joey Jay	30	Phoenix, Arizona	12th
13	Kahmora Hall	28	Chicago, Illinois	13th
14	Willow Pill	26	Denver, Colorado	Winner
14	Lady Camden	31	Sacramento, California	Runner-up
14	Angeria Paris VanMicheals	27	Atlanta, Georgia	3rd
14	Bosco	28	Seattle, Washington	3rd
14	Daya Betty	25	Springfield, Missouri	3rd (Note: Daya Betty originally placed thirteenth before re-entering the competition.)
14	DeJa Skye	31	Fresno, California	6th
14	Jorgeous	21	Nashville, Tennessee	6th
14	Jasmine Kennedie	22	New York City, New York	8th
14	Kerri Colby	24	Los Angeles, California	9th
14	Maddy Morphosis	26	Fayetteville, Arkansas	10th
14	Orion Story	25	Grand Rapids, Michigan	11th (Note: Orion Story originally placed thirteenth before re-entering the competition.)
14	Kornbread "The Snack" Jeté	29	Los Angeles, California	12th
14	Alyssa Hunter	26	Cataño, Puerto Rico	13th
14	June Jambalaya	29	Los Angeles, California	14th
15	Sasha Colby	37	Los Angeles, California	Winner
15	Anetra	25	Las Vegas, Nevada	Runner-up
15	Luxx Noir London	22	East Orange, New Jersey	3rd
15	Mistress Isabelle Brooks	24	Houston, Texas	3rd
15	Loosey LaDuca	32	Ansonia, Connecticut	5th
15	Salina EsTitties	31	Los Angeles, California	6th
15	Marcia Marcia Marcia	25	New York City, New York	7th
15	Malaysia Babydoll Foxx	32	Miami, Florida	8th
15	Spice	23	Los Angeles, California	9th
15	Jax	25	Darien, Connecticut	10th
15	Aura Mayari	30	Nashville, Tennessee	11th
15	Robin Fierce	26	Hartford, Connecticut	12th
15	Amethyst	27	West Hartford, Connecticut	13th
15	Sugar	23	Los Angeles, California	14th
15	Princess Poppy	26	San Francisco, California	15th
15	Irene Dubois	29	Seattle, Washington	16th
16	Nymphia Wind	27	New York City, New York	Winner
16	Sapphira Cristál	34	Philadelphia, Pennsylvania	Runner-up
16	Plane Jane	24	Boston, Massachusetts	3rd
16	Q	26	Kansas City, Missouri	4th
16	Morphine Love Dion	25	Miami, Florida	5th
16	Dawn	24	New York City, New York	6th
16	Mhi'ya Iman Le'Paige	34	Miami, Florida	7th
16	Plasma	24	New York City, New York	8th
16	Xunami Muse	33	New York City, New York	9th
16	Megami	33	New York City, New York	10th
16	Geneva Karr	30	Brownsville, Texas	11th
16	Amanda Tori Meating	26	Los Angeles, California	12th
16	Mirage	29	Las Vegas, Nevada	13th
16	Hershii LiqCour-Jeté	31	Los Angeles, California	14th
17	Onya Nurve	31	Cleveland, Ohio	Winner
17	Jewels Sparkles	23	Tampa, Florida	Runner-up
17	Lexi Love	34	Louisville, Kentucky	3rd
17	Sam Star	24	Leeds, Alabama	3rd
17	Suzie Toot	24	Fort Lauderdale, Florida	5th
17	Lana Ja'Rae	22	New York City, New York	6th
17	Lydia B Kollins	23	Pittsburgh, Pennsylvania	7th
17	Arrietty	28	Seattle, Washington	8th
17	Kori King	24	Boston, Massachusetts	9th
17	Acacia Forgot	28	Los Angeles, California	10th
17	Crystal Envy	27	Asbury Park, New Jersey	11th
17	Hormona Lisa	30	Chattanooga, Tennessee	12th
17	Joella	25	Los Angeles, California	13th
17	Lucky Starzzz	26	Miami, Florida	14th
18	Myki Meeks	29	Orlando, Florida	Winner
18	Nini Coco	29	Denver, Colorado	Runner-up
18	Darlene Mitchell	34	Los Angeles, California	3rd
18	Juicy Love Dion	24	Miami, Florida	4th
18	Jane Don't	32	Seattle, Washington	5th
18	Discord Addams	34	St. Petersburg, Florida	6th
18	Kenya Pleaser	27	Sumter, South Carolina	7th
18	Athena Dion	38	Miami, Florida	8th
18	Mia Starr	39	West Palm Beach, Florida	9th
18	Vita VonTesse Starr	38	Montgomery, Alabama	10th
18	Ciara Myst	31	Indianapolis, Indiana	11th
18	Briar Blush	25	Boston, Massachusetts	12th
18	Mandy Mango	29	Philadelphia, Pennsylvania	13th
18	DD Fuego	37	New York City, New York	14th

== Deaths ==
- Sahara Davenport (December 17, 1984 – October 1, 2012; aged 27), Season 2 contestant
- Chi Chi DeVayne (September 24, 1985 – August 20, 2020; aged 34), Season 8 contestant
- Jiggly Caliente (November 29, 1980 – April 27, 2025; aged 44), Season 4 contestant
