= Lip Sync LaLaPaRuza Smackdown (RuPaul's Drag Race season 15) =

- RuPaul's Drag Race episode
- Episode no.: Season 15; Episode 8
- Original air date: February 17, 2023

Episode chronology
← Previous "The Daytona Wind 2"	Next → "The Crystal Ball"
- RuPaul's Drag Race season 15

"Lip Sync LaLaPaRuza Smackdown" is the eighth episode of the fifteenth season of the American television series RuPaul's Drag Race. It originally aired on February 17, 2023. The episode has contestants participate a series of lip-syncs that culminates in the elimination of Jax. There are no guest judges.

== Episode ==
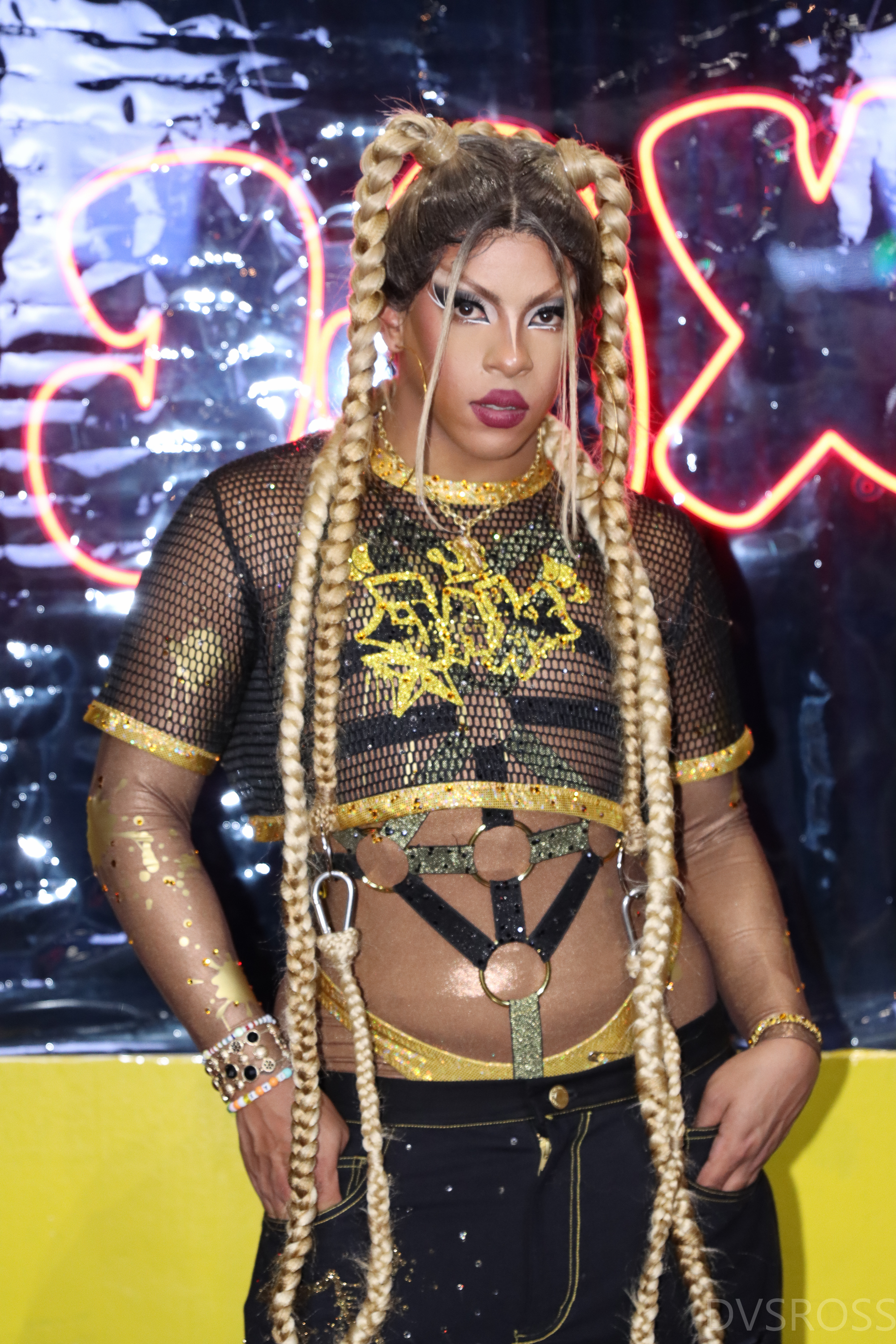
Jax (pictured at RuPaul's DragCon LA in 2023) is eliminated from the competition.

The contestants return to the Werk Room after Aura Mayari's elimination on the previous episode. They congratulate Mistress Isabelle Brooks for winning the previous main challenge, and share who they think are the frontrunners of the season. On a new day, RuPaul greets the contestants in the Werk Room and reveals the next main challenge: to participate in a "Lip Sync LaLaPaRuza Smackdown", a series of lip-syncs that culminates in an elimination. For each round, a contestant is chosen at random to select her opponent, who then selects the lip-sync song.

On the main stage, RuPaul welcomes fellow judges Michelle Visage and Ross Mathews. The contestants come to the main stage and RuPaul explains the rules before commencing the contest. First, Malaysia Babydoll Foxx chooses to lip-sync against Marcia Marcia Marcia, who selects "Boys Don't Cry" by Anitta. Marcia Marcia Marcia wins the lip-sync and is safe, while Malaysia Babydoll Foxx must continue to the next round. In the second lip-sync, Loosey LaDuca chooses Spice as her opponent, who selects "Do You Wanna Touch Me" by Joan Jett. Loosey LaDuca wins and is safe. Spice continues to the next round.

In the third lip-sync, Luxx Noir London chooses Salina EsTitties as her opponent, who chooses "It's All Coming Back to Me Now" by Celine Dion. Salina EsTitties wins and is safe, while Luxx Noir London must continue to the next round. In the fourth lip-sync, Mistress Isabelle Brooks chooses Jax as her opponent, who selects "Tell It to My Heart" (1987) by Taylor Dayne. Mistress Isabelle Brooks wins and is safe. Jax continues to the next round. The remaining contestants Anetra and Sasha Colby lip-sync. Anetra is randomly selected to pick the song and chooses "I'm in Love with a Monster" (2015) by Fifth Harmony. Sasha Colby wins and is safe. Anetra continues to the next round.

In the first lip-sync of the second round, Malaysia Babydoll Foxx chooses Spice as her opponent, who selects "Don't Go Yet" (2021) by Camila Cabello. Malaysia Babydoll Foxx wins and is safe, while Spice must continue to the final round. The three remaining contestants (Anetra, Jax, and Luxx Noir London) lip-sync to the remaining song, "The Right Stuff" (1988) by Vanessa Williams. Luxx Noir London wins and is safe. Anetra and Jax continue to the final round. Before the final round, RuPaul reveals a twist: one of the remaining contestants will be selected at random and she must choose one of the others to save without having to lip-sync. Anetra is selected and she saves Spice. Thus, Anetra and Jax lip-sync to "Finally" (1991) by CeCe Peniston. Anetra is declared the winner and Jax is eliminated from the competition.

== Production and broadcast ==
The episode originally aired on February 17, 2023. Jax has said she was not surprised by RuPaul's decision to save Anetra.

== Reception ==
Trae DeLellis of The A.V. Club gave the episode a rating of 'B+'. Drag Race contestant Brooke Lynn Hytes considers the episode's "I'm in Love with a Monster" lip-sync among her favorites on the show. Sam Damshenas of Gay Times wrote, "Viewers came out in droves to support Jax; many expressed that she was 'Jasmine Kennedie-d' due to their similar trajectories as lip-sync assassins who annihilated each of their respective LaLaPaRUza's but were sent packin' anyway."
