= Princess Poppy (drag queen) =

American drag performer

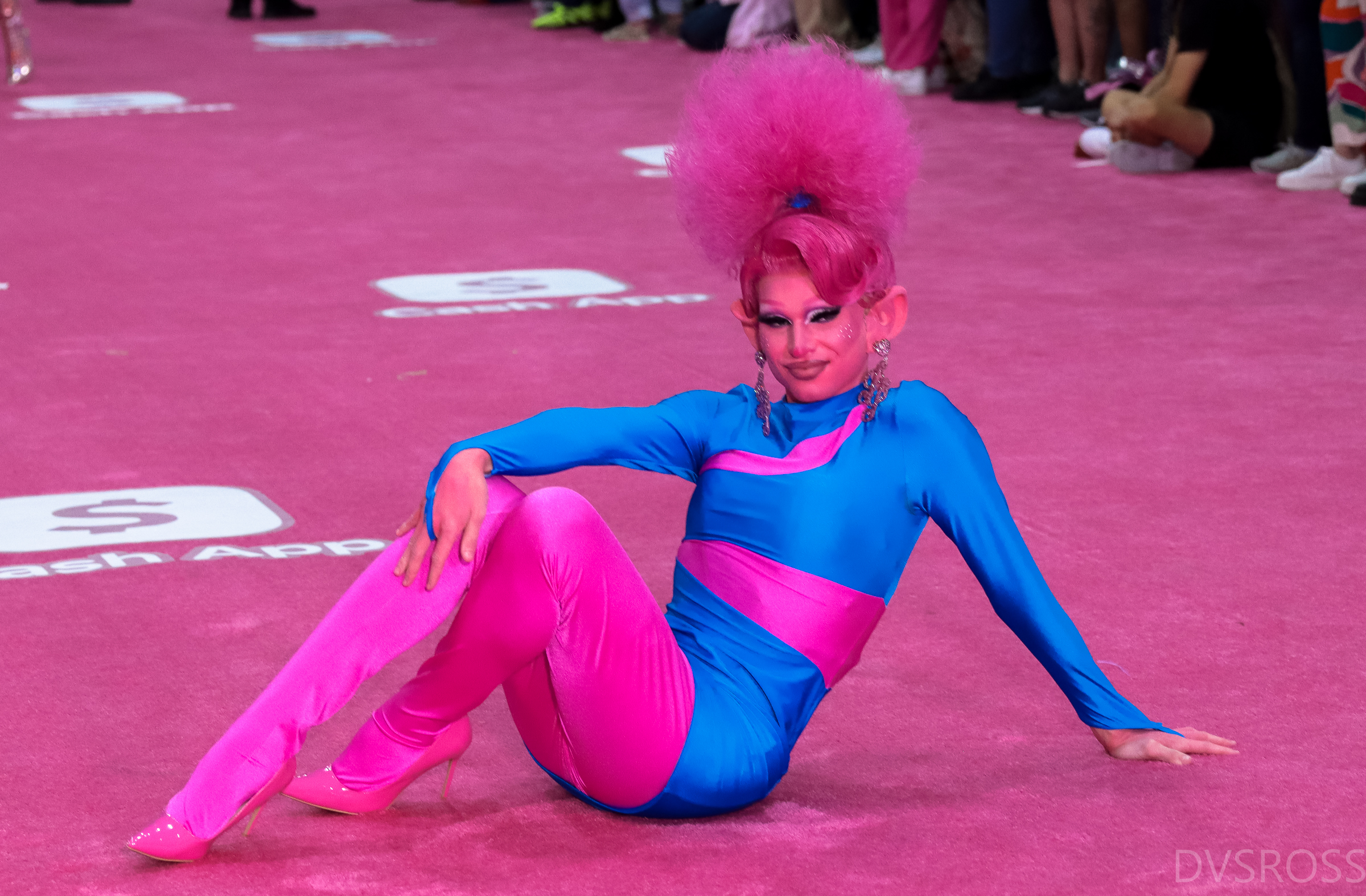
- Princess Poppy at RuPaul's DragCon LA, 2023
- Born: Thomas Schmidt
- Occupation: Drag queen
- Television: RuPaul's Drag Race (season 15)

Princess Poppy is the stage name of Thomas Schmidt, an American retired drag performer who competed on season 15 of RuPaul's Drag Race.

== Career ==
Princess Poppy competed on season 15 of RuPaul's Drag Race.

The show was filming among the COVID early years; Poppy recounted having to get tested six times in one day due to repeat false positive results before being approved for participation.

Her talent show entry was a lip sync to an original song by Danny Bernstein and Poppy about her and singing "twin" Petunia, a parasite tumor-like puppet. During the behind the scenes parallel show Untucked she realized that being a full time drag queen and the social media obligation was not what she wanted, although she will continue to do drag in some fashion.

She was the second contestant eliminated from the competition after losing a lip sync against Amethyst to "Ain't No Mountain High Enough" by Diana Ross.

Princess Poppy's look for the reunion episode paid tribute to season 1 contestant Rebecca Glasscock.

== Personal life ==
Princess Poppy was raised in Charlotte, North Carolina and is based in San Francisco.
