= Grand Finale (RuPaul's Drag Race season 15) =

- RuPaul's Drag Race episode
- Episode no.: Season 15; Episode 16
- Presented by: RuPaul
- Original air date: April 14, 2023

Guest appearances
- Leland; Orville Peck

Episode chronology
← Previous "Reunited!"	Next → "Rate-A-Queen"
- RuPaul's Drag Race season 15

"Grand Finale" is the sixteenth episode of the fifteenth season of the American television series RuPaul's Drag Race. It originally aired on April 14, 2023. The episode was filmed at the Ace Hotel in Los Angeles, California. It has the season's final four contestants perform to original songs, then face off in a series of lip-sync contests. The episode also features guest appearances by American singer and songwriter Leland and South African country musician Orville Peck. Sasha Colby is crowned the season's winner.

== Episode ==
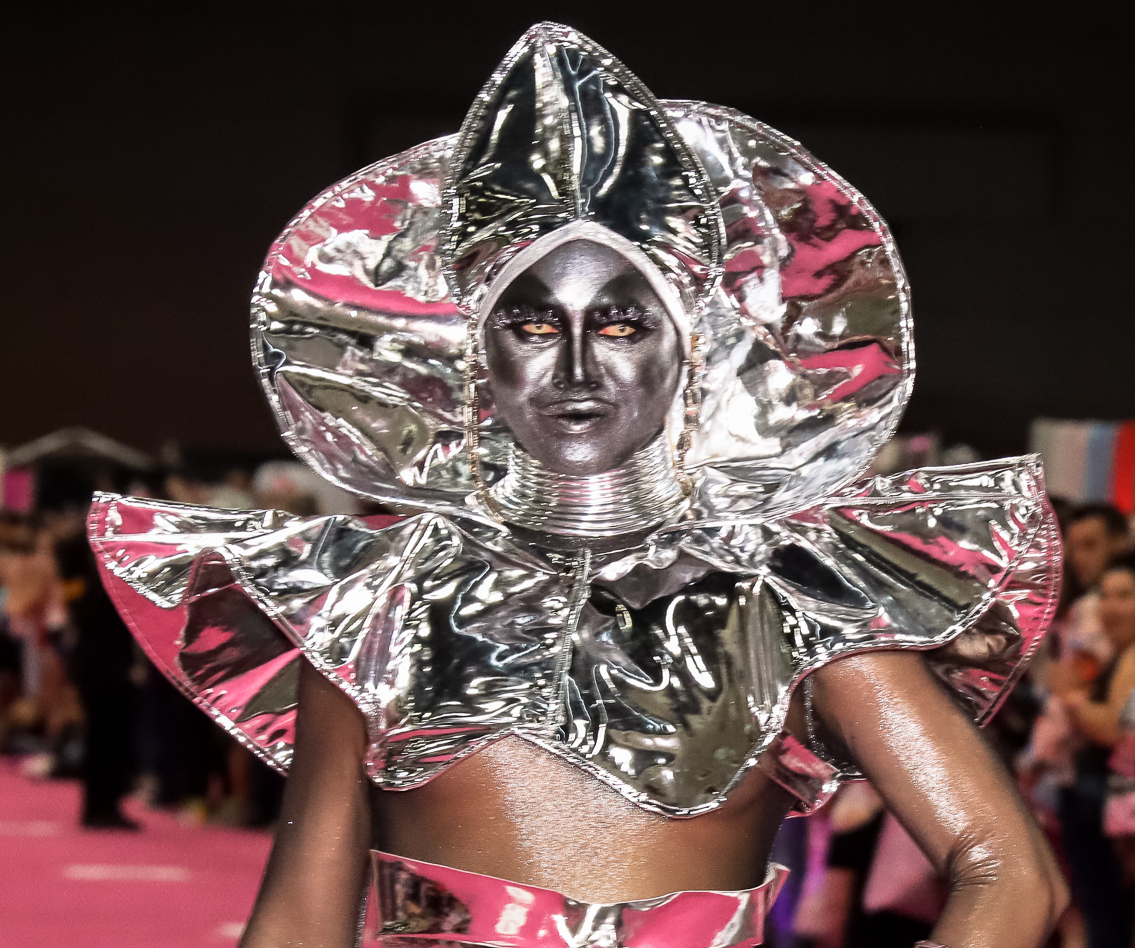
Sasha Colby (pictured at RuPaul's DragCon LA in 2023) is crowned the season's winner.

All of the contestants return for the grand finale. The final four contestants perform to a song that was written specifically for them. Anetra lip-syncs to "Lotus", Luxx Noir London lip-syncs to "It's Giving Fashion", Mistress Isabelle Brooks lip-syncs to "Delusion", and Sasha Colby lip-syncs to "Goddess".

After the performances, RuPaul tells the contestants that two will be advancing to the final lip-sync of the season. It is announced that the final two contestants are Anetra and Sasha Colby, meaning Luxx Noir London and Mistress Isabelle Brooks are eliminated from the competition. It is then announced that Malaysia Babydoll Foxx is this season's Miss Congeniality. Anetra and Sasha Colby face off in a lip-sync contest to "Knock on Wood" by Amii Stewart. It is announced that Sasha Colby is the winner, making Anetra the runner-up.

== Production and broadcast ==
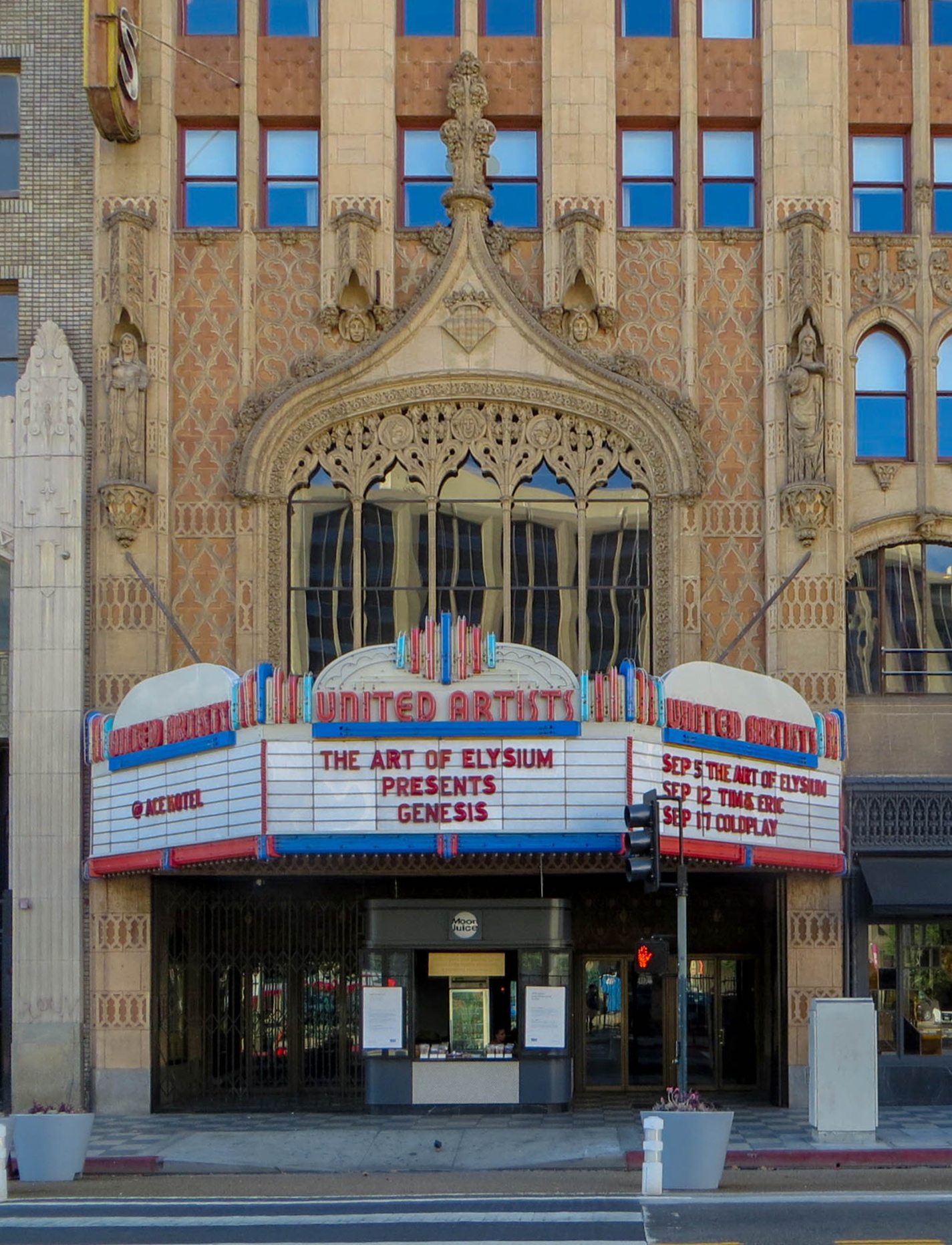
The episode was filmed at the Ace Hotel (exterior pictured in 2014) in Los Angeles, California.

The episode was filmed at the Ace Hotel in Los Angeles, California, and originally aired on April 14, 2023. During the episode, RuPaul pays tribute to some of the gay bars in the U.S. streaming the episode.

Sasha Colby's final lip-sync had a "very intentional message", according to Them magazine. She has said, "It was a very specific choice to be naked in these times. I wanted them to see what they're trying to eradicate." Sasha Colby dedicated her win to "every trans person past, present, and future" and said the trans community "is not going anywhere". She also said, "With this legislation and everything happening, for me to represent Drag Race and such a huge conglomerate like MTV and be exactly what [conservatives] want to eradicate is so powerful. I understand the eyes on me, which is why I wanted to be naked. I wanted to normalize this trans body!"

The episode also featured a first look at the next season of RuPaul's Drag Race All Stars and the new season of Queen of the Universe. The final four contestants did not know who won the season until the finale aired. Luxx Noir London said she was disappointed to be eliminated.

=== Fashion ===
Sasha Colby was dressed as Medusa during "Goddess".

For the "Knock on Wood" performance, Anetra wears a bodysuit, white boots, and a blonde wig. Attached to her chest is an embellishment resembling a human heart, from which she later pulls out a long red ribbon. Sasha Colby starts in a black velvet coat and a purple dress, which she removes to reveal lingerie underneath. She has a long ponytail.

== Reception ==
Trae DeLellis of The A.V. Club gave the episode a rating of 'B'. Jason P. Frank of Vulture rated the episode three out of five stars. Alexander Rodriguez of Metrosource said Luxx Noir London gave "fierce energy" and showcased her stage skills during "It's Giving Fashion". Kevin O'Keeffe said Luxx Noir London's performance "was perfectly suited to her, and she killed the performance of it". Stephen Daw of Billboard described the final lip-sync contest as "dramatic".
