= Robin Fierce =

American drag performer

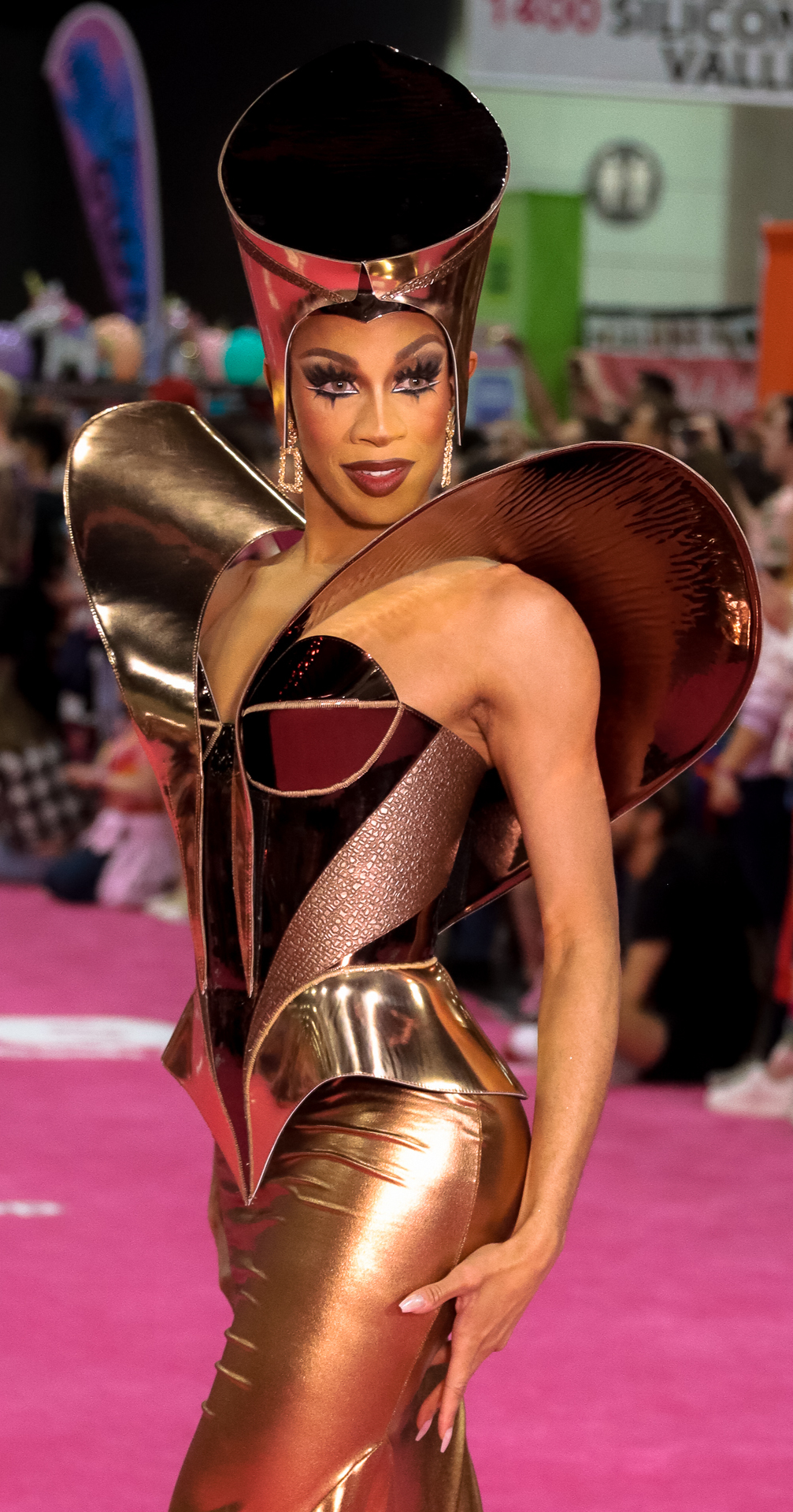
- Robin Fierce at RuPaul's DragCon LA, 2023
- Born: Rashawn Lee Jr. October 15, 1995 (age 31); Brooklyn, New York, U.S.
- Occupation: Drag queen
- Television: RuPaul's Drag Race (season 15)

Robin Fierce is the stage name of Rashawn Lee Jr. (born October 15, 1995), an American drag performer who competed on the fifteenth season of RuPaul's Drag Race.

== Early life ==
Rashawn Lee Jr. was born to Rashawn Lee Sr. in Brooklyn, and raised in Hartford, Connecticut.

== Career ==
Prior to competing on Drag Race, Lee worked at a Best Buy store. He competed as Robin Fierce on the show's fifteenth season in 2023. She and fellow contestants Amethyst and Loosey LaDuca were the first on the series to represent Connecticut. Robin Fierce impersonated Karen Huger for the Snatch Game challenge. She was eliminated from the competition by Jax. The show's reunion episode featured a video of Connecticut legislators recognizing competitors from the state.

In 2023, she was a guest speaker at Yale Law School. According to Yale Daily News, Robin Fierce "made history as the first drag queen guest speaker in the law school’s nearly two centuries of existence, taking her audience through dramatic readings of three children’s and young adult books and then showcasing a dance number." She also attended a flag-raising ceremony at the Connecticut State Capitol to commemorate Pride Month.

== Personal life ==
Lee is based in Hartford. Prior to appearing on Drag Race, he and fellow contestant Amethyst dated.

== Filmography ==
=== Television ===
- RuPaul's Drag Race (season 15, 2023)

== See also ==
- List of people from Hartford, Connecticut
