= Jax (drag queen) =

American drag queen

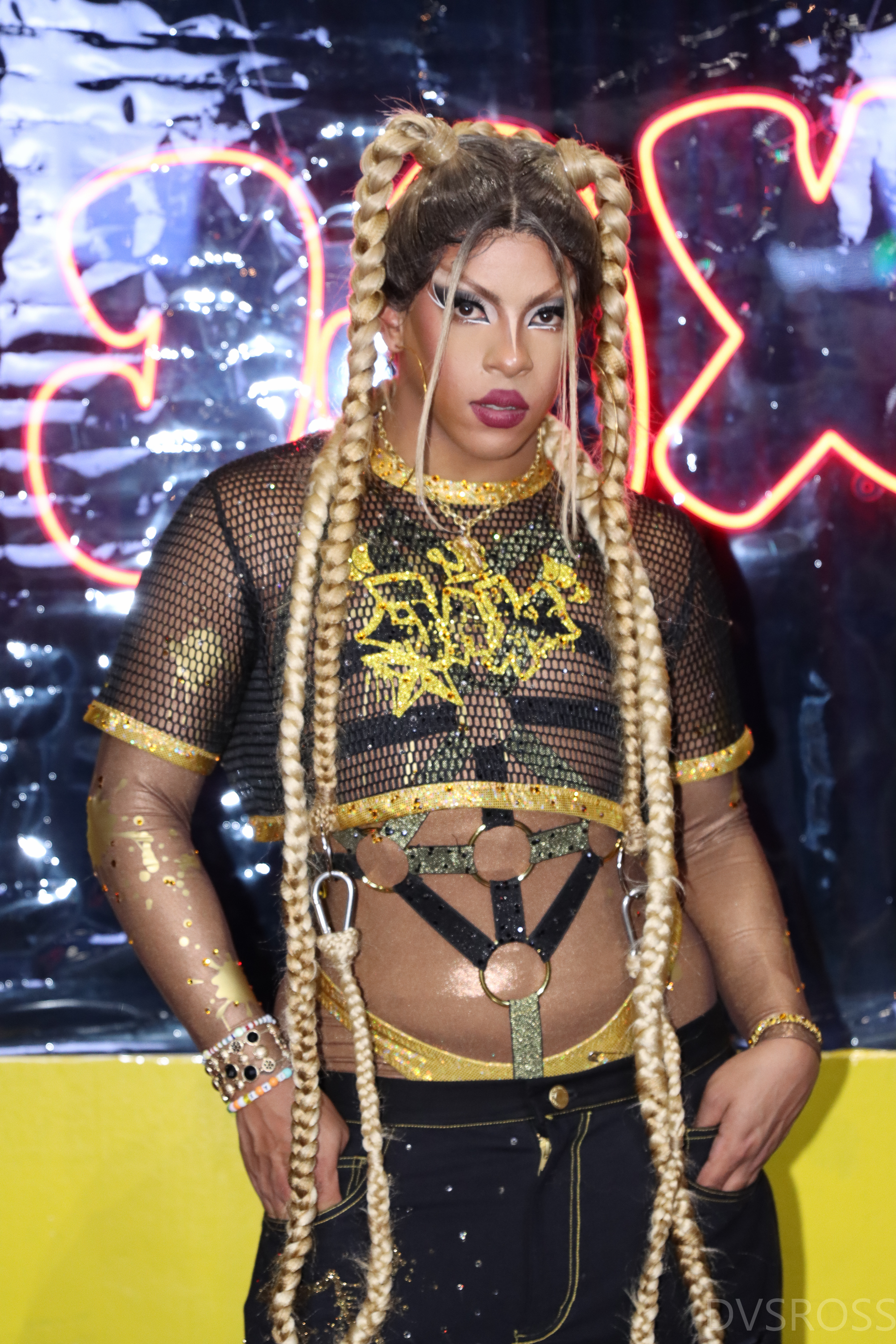
- Jax at RuPaul's DragCon LA, 2023
- Born: Jackson McGoldrick; April 5, 1997 (age 29); Puerto Rico
- Education: School of Visual Arts (BFA)
- Occupation: Drag queen
- Television: RuPaul's Drag Race (season 15)

Jax is the stage name of Jackson McGoldrick (born April 5, 1997), an American drag queen, dancer, and photographer. Jax competed on the fifteenth season of RuPaul's Drag Race.

== Early years ==
McGoldrick was born in Puerto Rico and raised in Darien, Connecticut. He participated in gymnastics and competitive cheerleading. He attended the School of Visual Arts, where he graduated with a Bachelor of Fine Arts degree in photography and videography.

== Career ==
On December 13, 2022, Jax was announced as one of the 16 contestants who would compete in the fifteenth season of RuPaul's Drag Race. During her time on the show, Jax placed among the top positions in the first episode. She placed in the bottom twice, eliminating Robin Fierce and Aura Mayari in lip syncs. Jax was eliminated in episode 8, after losing in the LipSync Lalaparuza Smackdown against Anetra. She finished in 10th place.

Jax and fellow contestant Luxx Noir London were guest speakers for drag historian and author Joe E. Jeffreys' course at The New School about the impact of RuPaul's Drag Race.

== Personal life ==
Jax uses she/they pronouns when in drag, and has described herself as the "Simone Biles of drag".

They reside in Astoria, Queens.

== Filmography ==
=== Television ===
Year	Title	Role	Notes	Ref.
2023	RuPaul's Drag Race	Herself/Contestant	Season 15 (10th place)	
2023	RuPaul's Drag Race: Untucked	Herself/Contestant	Season 15 (10th place)	

=== Web series ===
Year	Title	Role	Notes	Ref
2023	Meet the Queens	Herself	Stand-alone special RuPaul's Drag Race Season 15	
2023	EW News Flash	Herself	Guest	
2023	BuzzFeed Celeb	Herself	Guest	
2023	MTV News	Herself	Guest	
2023	Today with Hoda and Jenna	Herself	Guest	
2023	Drip or Drop	Herself	Guest	
2023	Whatcha Packin’	Herself	Guest	
2023	Squirrel Friends	Herself	Guest; Podcast	

== Discography ==
=== Featured singles ===
Title	Year	Album	Ref
"One Night Only" (with the cast of RuPaul's Drag Race season 15)	2023	Non-album singles	
"Golden Hips (Ol' Dirty Bitches)" (with Loosey LaDuca, Anetra & Robin Fierce)	2023	Non-album singles	

== See also ==
- LGBTQ culture in New York City
- List of LGBTQ people from New York City
