= Marcia Marcia Marcia =

American drag performer

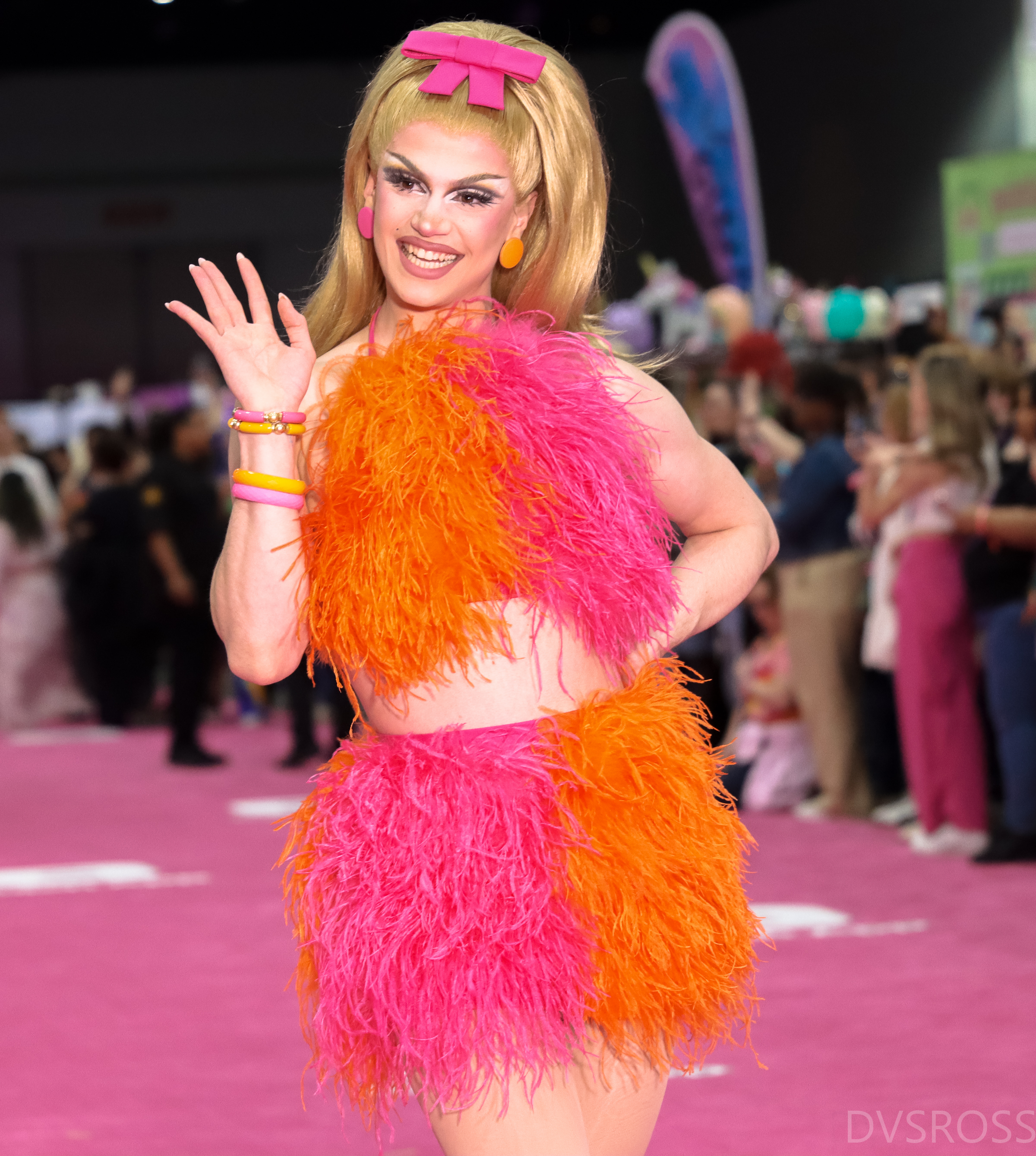
- Marcia Marcia Marcia at RuPaul's DragCon LA, 2023
- Born: Marty Lauter; Northport, New York, U.S.
- Education: Boston Conservatory at Berklee (BFA)
- Television: RuPaul's Drag Race (season 15)
- Spouse: Kyle Samuel (m. 2026)

Marcia Marcia Marcia is the stage name of Marty Lauter, an American drag performer and actor who competed on season 15 of RuPaul's Drag Race.

== Early life and education ==
Lauter grew up in Northport, New York. They (Note: Lauter uses they/them pronouns) graduated from the Boston Conservatory at Berklee.

== Career ==
Lauter made their Broadway debut as a vacation swing in Kinky Boots in 2018. They joined the national tour of Hello, Dolly!, and played an Angel in the off-Broadway run of Kinky Boots. They played Victor and understudied the Emcee in the 2024 Broadway revival of Cabaret.

Lauter's drag persona is Marcia Marcia Marcia. She competed on season 15 of RuPaul's Drag Race. She was deemed "safe" by judges for a "record-breaking" seven consecutive episodes, and impersonated Tim Gunn for the Snatch Game challenge. Marcia Marcia Marcia placed in the bottom two of the stand-up comedy challenge and faced off in a lip-sync contest against Anetra to "Boss Bitch" (2020) by Doja Cat. The lip-sync was the season's first to receive one million views on YouTube. Joey Nolfi of Entertainment Weekly called the battle "one of the best lip-syncs in Drag Race her-story as the pair grooved, duck-walked, and performed high-flying gymnastics". Marcia Marcia Marcia's Instagram following grew by 876 percent while Drag Race aired.

In 2023, Marcia Marcia Marcia launched the makeup brand Marciax3 Cosmetics. They also appeared in the music video for "Elle Woods" by Lagoona Bloo, along with Kerri Colby and Olivia Lux.

== Personal life ==
Lauter is based in New York City and is non-binary, using they/them pronouns.

Lauter married Kyle Samuel on. October 4, 2026 on Long Island, New York with Drag Race alum Luxx Noir London and Jan Sport attending.

== Credits ==
=== Film ===
Year	Title	Role	Notes
2017	Louder Than Words	Niall	Short film
2026	Stop! That! Train!	Alli	Credited as Marty Lauter

=== Television ===
Year	Title	Role	Notes
2023	RuPaul's Drag Race (season 15)	Herself (contestant)	7th place
2023	RuPaul's Drag Race: Untucked (Season 15)	Herself	

=== Theatre ===
Year	Show	Role	Notes
2018	Kinky Boots	Swing	Broadway
2019-2020	Hello, Dolly!	Ensemble u/s Ambrose Kemper	US National Tour
2022	Kinky Boots	Angel	Off-Broadway
2024-2025	Cabaret	Victor u/s The Emcee	Broadway revival
2025	Cabaret	The Emcee	Broadway revival

== See also ==
- LGBTQ culture in New York City
- List of LGBTQ people from New York City
