= Amethyst (drag queen) =

American drag performer

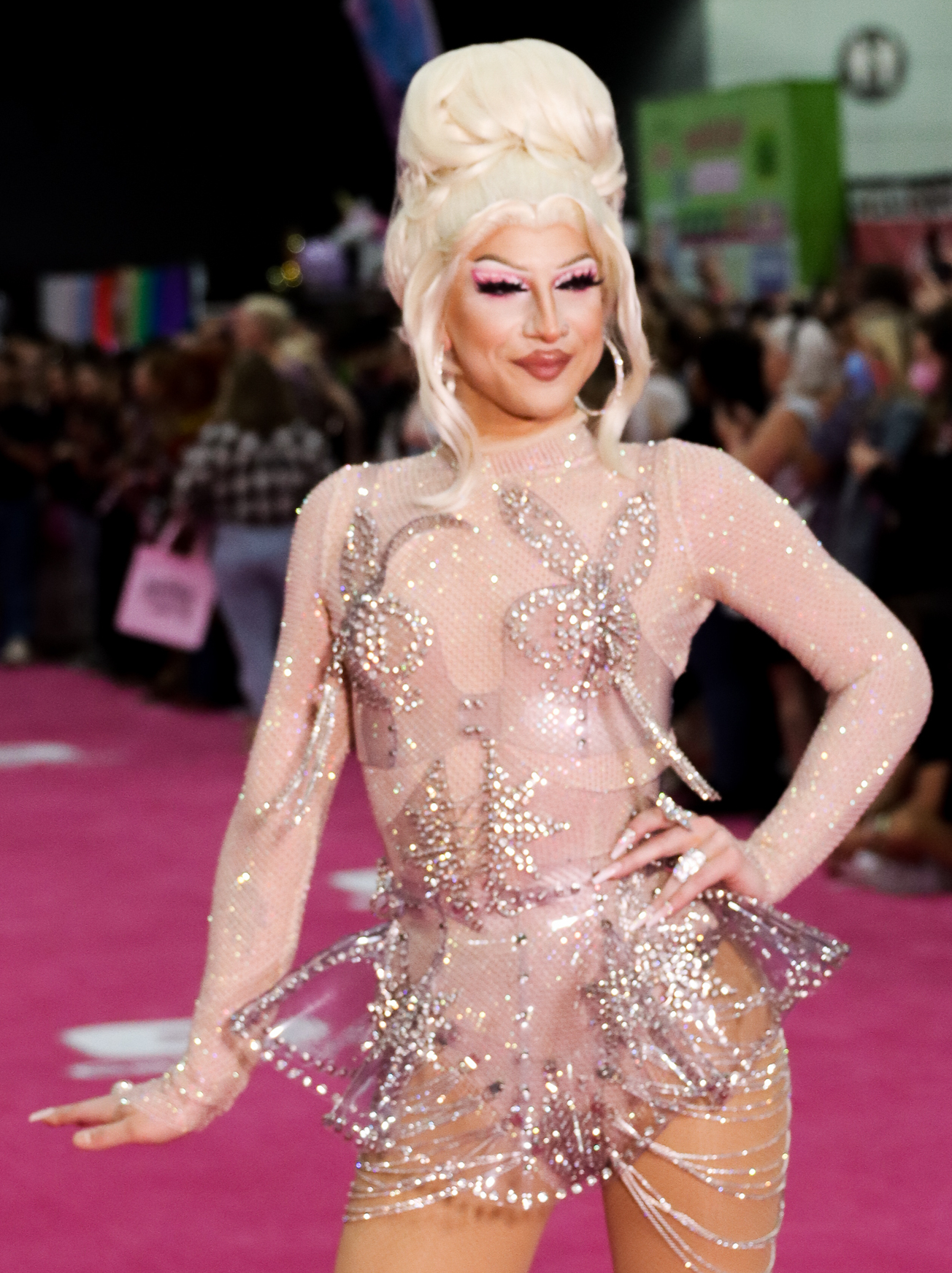
- Amethyst at RuPaul's DragCon LA, 2023
- Born: February 4, 1995 (age 31); Bristol, Connecticut, U.S.
- Other name: Amy Taylor
- Occupations: Drag queen; singer
- Television: RuPaul's Drag Race (season 15)

Amy Taylor, known professionally as Amethyst, is an American drag performer and singer who competed on season 15 of RuPaul's Drag Race.

== Career ==
Amethyst is a drag performer. Charlie Grey of Queerty has described her as a "TikTok-grown comedy queen". Amethyst competed on season 15 of RuPaul's Drag Race. She was eliminated following the design challenge, after placing in the bottom two three times. She impersonated Tan Mom for the Snatch Game challenge.

== Personal life ==
Amethyst grew up all around Connecticut, including Bristol, West Hartford, and Terryville, Connecticut. She had dated fellow contestant Robin Fierce prior to appearing on Drag Race. In 2024, Amethyst came out as trans and shared her name Amy.

== Filmography ==
=== Television ===
- RuPaul's Drag Race (season 15)

== Discography ==
=== Mixtapes ===
List of mixtapes, with selected details
Title	Details	Ref.
Kind Of Girl	Released: February 26, 2021; Singles: "Everywhere", "Superstars"; Format: Digital download, streaming	
Wannabe Popstar	Released: November 29, 2022; Format: Digital download, streaming, CD	

=== Singles ===
Title	Year	Album	Ref.
"Rock My Body"	2023	–	
"Scary"	2021	–	
"Superstars"	2020	Kind Of Girl	
"Ratz (ft. Kenya Mone Heart & Mia E. Z'Lay"	2020	–	
"So Hot You're Hurting My Feelings"	2020	–	
"Everywhere"	2020	Kind Of Girl	
