= RuPaul's DragCon LA =

Annual expo of drag culture held in Los Angeles

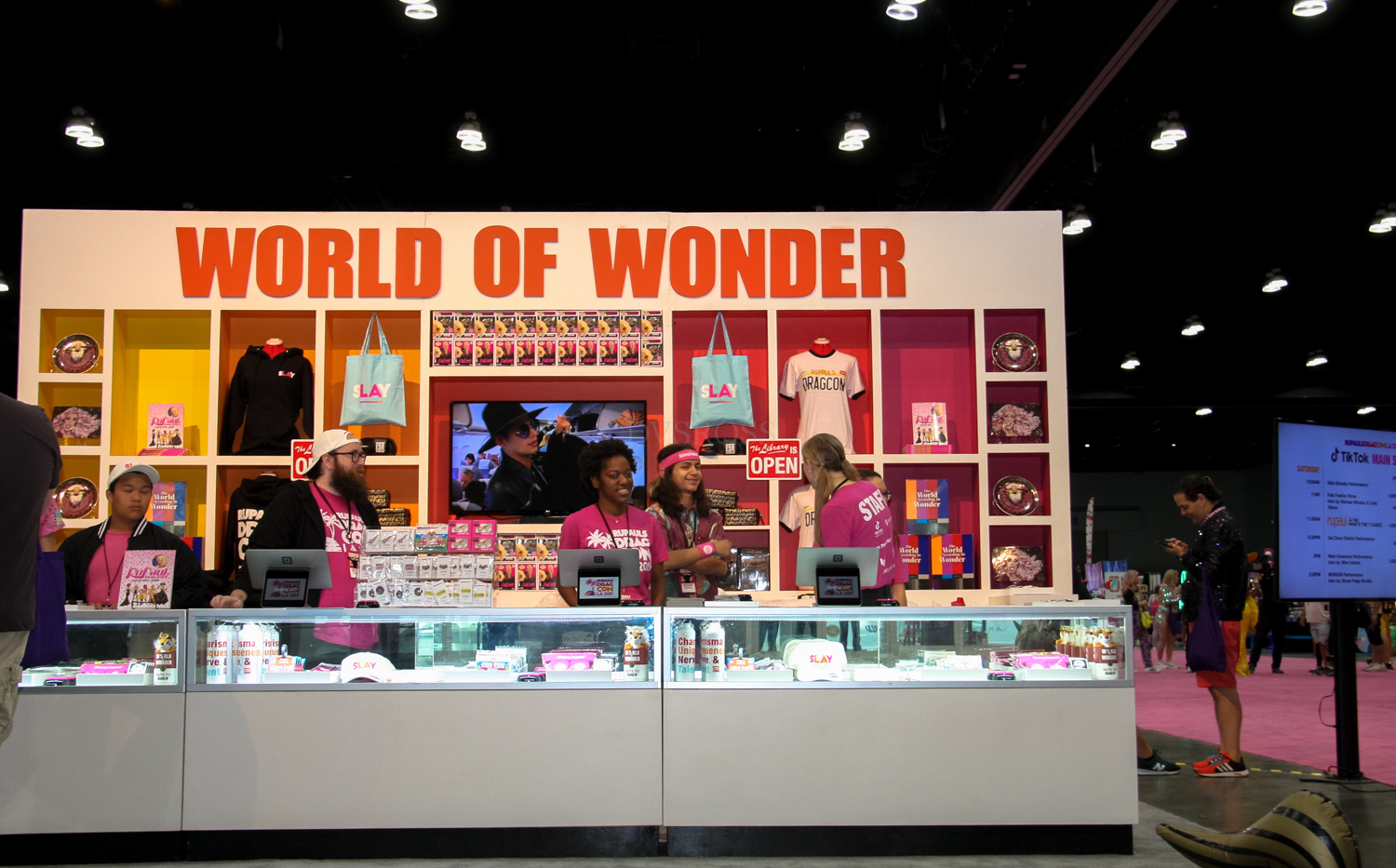
World of Wonder counter at 2019 DragCon LA

RuPaul's DragCon LA is an annual expo of drag culture held in Los Angeles billed as a "convention that celebrates 'the art of drag, queer culture and self-expression for all'", which debuted in 2015. Its sister event is RuPaul's DragCon NYC started in 2017, and is considered the "world's largest celebration of drag culture." The event is an outgrowth of the internationally successful RuPaul's Drag Race, which generated Drag Race Thailand, RuPaul's Drag Race UK, RuPaul's Drag Race All Stars, and Chile's The Switch Drag Race. RuPaul's Drag Race and the DragCons come from World of Wonder Entertainment (WOW), a production company based in Los Angeles.

At RuPaul's DragCon LA, past RuPaul's Drag Race contestants and other well-known drag artists meet with fans, take pictures, sign autographs, and sometimes perform or take part in a discussion panel, as well as sell merchandise. The discussion panels vary from more obvious topics like clothing, fashion, wigs, and makeup, to history of drag, drag activism, trans rights, queer pop culture, and political issues facing the LGBTQ community. WOW's co-director and producer of the convention, Randy Barbato shared that ironically the panels can be quite deep because although drag queens are known for being fun and about their looks, the queens are smart artists and activists, he also said, "For us, drag has always been political!" The main stage presents performances and runway events all day long. There is also hundreds of vendors offering drag supplies and accessories; in 2016, two hundred vendors sold $2.3 million of 'DragCon exclusive merchandise' by vendors and exhibitors on the expo floor. In 2018, the two U.S. DragCons, co-produced by RuPaul and World of Wonder brought in $8 million with a combined 100,000 visitors.

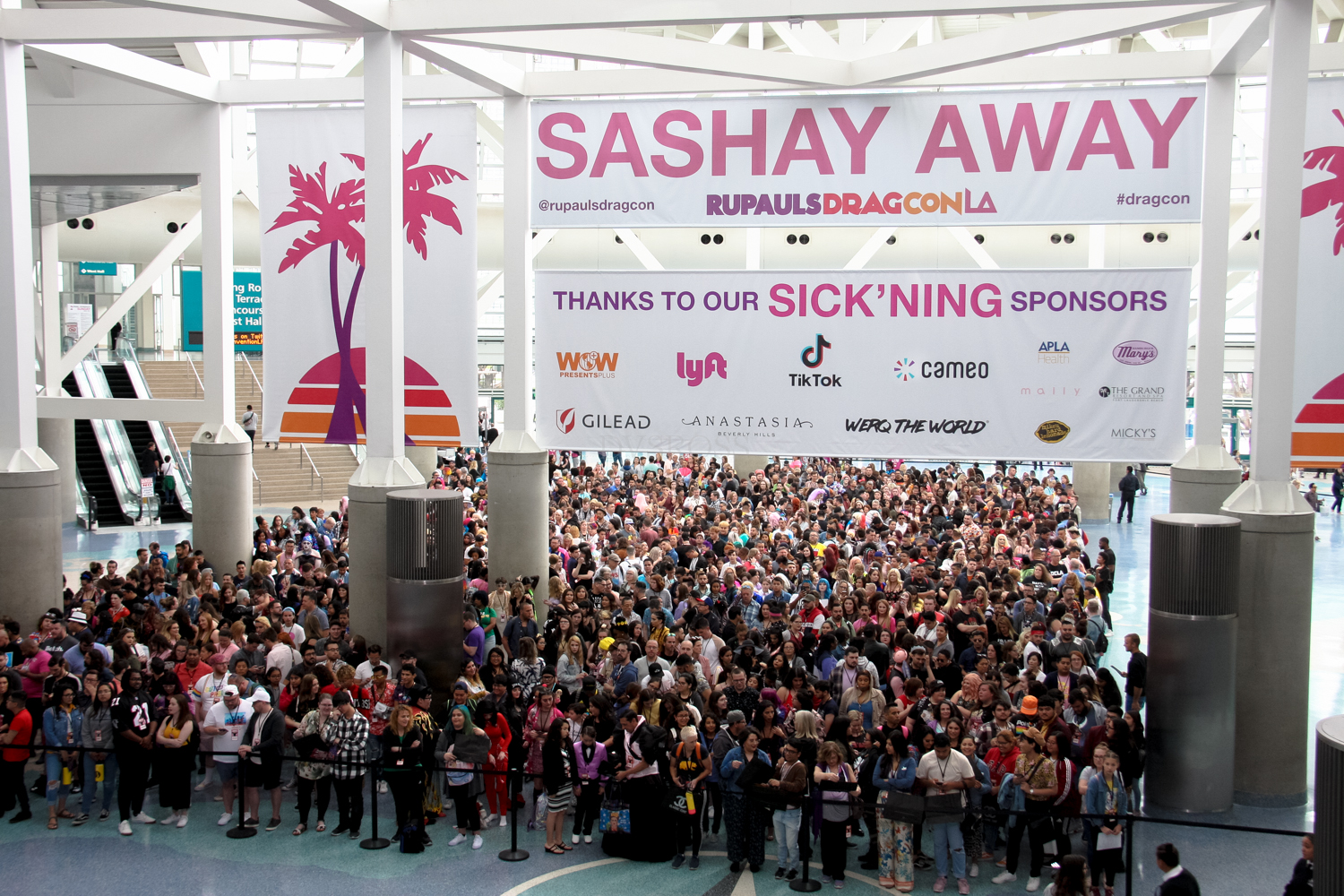
Attendees at RuPaul's DragCon LA 2019

According to Glossy, "the event's core demographic are 18- to 34-year-olds, with 60% female attendees and 40% male. About 60% of DragCon's audience identify as LGBTQ and 40% as heterosexual." IndieWire notes that DragCon is similar to the annual Burning Man art festival in that attendees exhibit radical self-expression, the culture is participatory and inclusive, and what is presented is ephemeral.

In 2020, due to the COVID-19 pandemic, the event went online as Digital DragCon. The most recent DragCon LA took place July 2024 at the Los Angeles Convention Center. There was no DragCon LA in 2025, and no announcement of a 2026 event as of September 2026, though the first DragCon Brasil took place in São Paulo, Brazil in June 2026.

== History ==
In 2020, and due to the worldwide COVID-19 pandemic, social distancing and stay-at-home orders—starting in March throughout California—resulted in large events being cancelled, postponed, or like the "reborn" RuPaul's Digital DragCon 2020, going online. The two-day event was hosted by RuPaul with guests including Jackie Cox, Love Connie, Karen from Finance, Varla Jean Merman, "Friday" singer Rebecca Black, and Tony Hale from Veep. The convention featured "performances, panels, merchandise" and be streamed for free on World of Wonder's YouTube channel.

== Beauty influencers ==
According to World of Wonder (WOW) co-founder Fenton Bailey, "RuPaul was the first drag queen associated with beauty (products), with MAC Cosmetics in the 1990s." RuPaul's Drag Race has highlighted how the drag queens embrace and use make-up as "drag queen(s) [sic] stress-tests the best beauty products"; many are also beauty influencers for various brands including their own; some of whom have booths at the convention to sample and sell products. Glossy notes that of "beauty festivals" DragCon is one of few with "ultra-engaged audiences."

In 2015, the first year of DragCon LA, there were eight beauty companies presented. DragCon "has seen 615% year-over-year growth in beauty vendors and sponsors"; with "more than $8.2 million in on-site sales in 2018, and 93% of attendees purchased merchandise valued at $200 or more."

== Interacting with drag queens ==
Ginger Minj, when asked the value in meeting fans personally, said it helps humanize the drag queen they've only seen on the screen, and "helps them realize that this is a serious job for us, not just fun and games on TV". She notes that the queens have a job because of the fans so she cultivates positive relationships with them.
