= List of people from Fayetteville, Arkansas =

This is a list of people who were born in, have been residents of, or are otherwise associated with the city of Fayetteville, Arkansas.

== Television and movies ==
- Lisa Blount, actress and Oscar-winning producer
- Brent Bradshaw, writer and performer
- TJ Holmes, CNN anchor
- Jason Moore, director of 2004 Tony Award Best Musical Avenue Q
- Maddy Morphosis, drag queen contestant of the fourteenth season of RuPaul's Drag Race
- Mary Kate Wiles, actress and producer

== Sports ==
- Ronnie Brewer, former Arkansas Razorback and NBA player
- Sam Hurley, track and field athlete, former Texas Longhorn, and social media influencer
- Blake Parker, former Arkansas Razorback and MLB pitcher
- Wallace Spearmon, former Arkansas Razorback and Olympic sprinter
- Payton Willis (born 1998), basketball player in the Israeli Basketball Premier League

== Authors and poets ==
- Fleda Brown, poet and author
- Richard Corben, comic book artist for Heavy Metal
- Ellen Gilchrist, novelist
- Donald Harington, author
- E. Lynn Harris, author of ten consecutive The New York Times Best Seller list books
- Joan Hess, author of the Claire Malloy and Arly Hanks mystery series
- George Johnson, science writer and author
- Douglas C. Jones, historical fiction author
- John Rollin Ridge, first Native American novelist
- John Edward Williams, novelist and poet
- Miller Williams, poet

== Musicians ==
- Cate Brothers, singer-songwriter musician duo
- Ronnie Hawkins, rockabilly musician
- Nick Shoulders, country musician
- Lucinda Williams, Grammy Award-winning songwriter and daughter of Miller Williams
- Sawyer Hill, singer-songwriter of band "Sawyer Hill"

== Government ==
- Jim Bryson, member of the Tennessee Senate from District 23
- Bill Clinton, 42nd U.S. president and former Arkansas governor
- Hillary Clinton, former U.S. secretary of state, First Lady, and U.S. senator
- Lance Eads, Republican member of the Arkansas House of Representatives for Washington County since 2015; former resident
- J. William Fulbright, former U.S. senator
- John W. Grabiel, Republican gubernatorial nominee in 1922 and 1924; Ohio native, attorney in Fayetteville until his death in 1928
- Lafayette Gregg, associate justice of the Arkansas Supreme Court 1868–1874, Republican member of the Arkansas House of Representatives for Washington County 1854–1856
- Grant Hodges, Republican member of the Arkansas House of Representatives for Benton County since 2015; former Fayetteville resident
- Jim House, Democratic member of the Arkansas House of Representatives
- Ben Hulse, member of the California State Senate, born and reared near Fayetteville
- Dustin McDaniel, former attorney general of Arkansas
- David Pryor, former Arkansas governor and former U.S. senator
- Mark Pryor, former U.S. senator

== Other ==
- David A. Bednar, former professor at the University of Arkansas; member of the Quorum of the Twelve Apostles in the Church of Jesus Christ of Latter-day Saints
- George W. Bond, educator and former president of Louisiana Tech University
- Boogie2988, YouTuber; 2016 Game Award winner voted as Trending Gamer of 2016
- Maurice Britt, decorated World War II veteran
- Sarah Caldwell, opera director, impresario, and stage director
- Admiral Vern E. Clark, chief of Naval Operations, US Navy
- Richard O. Covey, retired U.S. Air Force officer and former NASA astronaut
- J.R. Bob Dobbs, reclusive figurehead of the Church of the SubGenius
- E. Fay Jones, architect
- James Duard Marshall, artist
- John H. Pruitt, World War I soldier, one of only nineteen men to receive the Medal of Honor twice
- Savvy Shields, Miss America 2017
- Martin R. Steele, served 35 years in the Marine Corps, now president and CEO of the Intrepid Sea, Air & Space Museum in New York City
- Edward Durell Stone, architect
- Bud Walton, Wal-Mart co-founder
- Weev, computer hacker
- Donald Roller Wilson, artist
