= Maddy Morphosis =

American drag performer

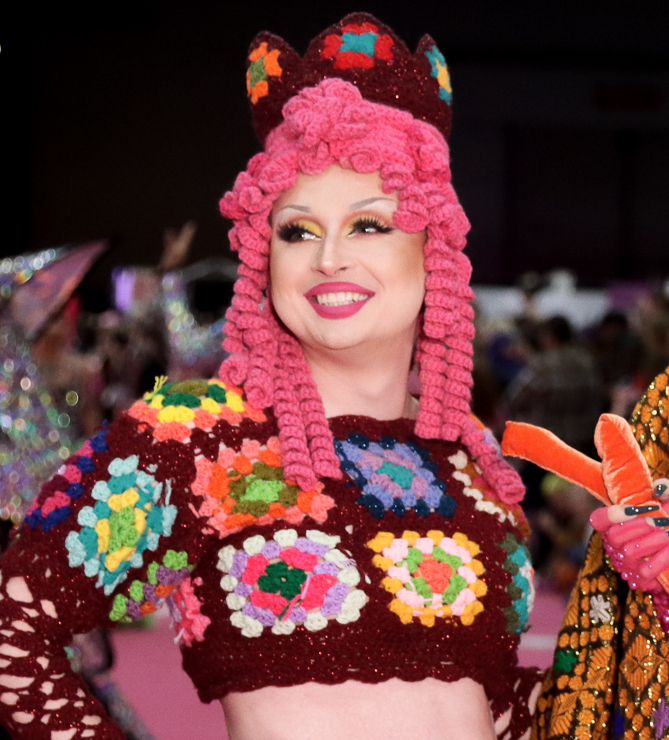
- Maddy Morphosis at RuPaul's DragCon LA, 2023
- Born: Fayetteville, Arkansas, U.S.
- Television: RuPaul's Drag Race (season 14)

Maddy Morphosis is an American drag performer most known for competing on season 14 of RuPaul's Drag Race. She is the show's first contestant to identify as a heterosexual. Since 2023, Maddy Morphosis has hosted the talk show web series Give It to Me Straight.

== Early life ==
Maddy Morphosis is from Fayetteville, Arkansas, and worked at Target before appearing on Drag Race. Maddy Morphosis dropped out of college.

== Career ==
Maddy Morphosis has been doing drag since 2017 and describes her persona as "Arkansas's most overrated drag queen". Her name is a play on the word "metamorphosis".

=== RuPaul's Drag Race ===
In December 2021, Maddy Morphosis was announced as a contestant on RuPaul's Drag Race season 14. She was the first cisgender heterosexual man to compete on the show. Her inclusion in the franchise sparked an initial backlash and opened a broader conversation about the implications of cishet inclusion in predominantly LGBTQ+ spaces. Writing for The Conversation, Theresa Kenney and Linzey Corridon argued that Maddy Morphosis' casting "overshadows more than six decades of documented queer performance art within carefully crafted safe spaces" and "puts racialized queer histories, community discomfort and modes of allyship to the backseat all for the sake of shock-value inclusion." In an interview with Pedestrian, Australian drag queens Felicity Frockaccino and Marlena Dali said that while "drag is for everyone," the decision to cast Morphosis "speaks to a wider issue of diversity on the show". According to Dali: "The problem lies with the lack of representation of more marginalised people such as drag kings, non-binary/trans people, Indigenous people, and disabled people." Frockaccino added that if she were Maddy Morphosis, she, as an LGBTQ+ ally, would give up her spot for a queer person.

During this time, Maddy Morphosis received support from other drag queens, including some of her fellow-contestants from season 14. Divina De Campo, finalist of RuPaul's Drag Race UK series 1, advocated for queer spaces to be accepting of people who are respectful and appreciative towards the community. "Drag is supposed to toy with and subvert traditional approaches to gender, which Maddy Morphosis appears to be doing – even if she isn't considered queer," she said.

On December 5, 2021, Maddy Morphosis published a statement on Instagram in response to the backlash. "I'm not here to show the world that 'staight guys can do drag'. For anyone saying that I'm representing an underrepresented group, I appreciate you, but straight men are not a persecuted and excluded group within the drag community," she explained. Maddy Morphosis also shared that in high school, drag offered her a safe space to explore her gender identity and she hopes her casting will "lead to more marginalized groups being showcased and represented."

Maddy Morphosis's entrance look on the first episode of Drag Race was inspired by Guy Fieri. Sam Damshenas of Gay Times wrote "Maddy immediately won over viewers due to her sheer respect for drag and LGBTQ+ culture, as well as her jaw-dropping runway presentations." In episode three ("A Pair of Balls"), Maddy Morphosis won a lip sync to Kylie Minogue's "I Love You" against June Jambalaya. In the sixth episode, she landed in the bottom for a second time after underperforming in the "Glamazon Prime" maxi challenge, which required contestants to design a runway look parodying e-commerce packaging. Michael Cubby, writing for Nylon, said that Maddy Morphosis "chose camp over style, haphazardly crafting a patchwork-style dress and using a blowup doll as a prop in a way that felt more confusing than entertaining." She was eliminated from the competition after losing the lip sync, set against "Suga Mama" by Beyonce, to Jasmine Kennedie.

Maddy Morphosis received the Golden Boot award during the reunion episode, and wore an Elvis Presley-inspired outfit during the season finale.

=== Give It To Me Straight ===
After Drag Race, Maddy Morphosis launched the talk show Give It To Me Straight on their YouTube channel, later published on podcast-streaming services through the Moguls of Media network created by fellow Drag Race queens Alaska Thunderfuck and Willam Belli. The talk show features interviews with drag queens from the Drag Race franchise as well as other drag queens and other queer media personalities, and gives more in-depth discussions on her interviews in the talk show compared to other mainstream interviewers. Maddy Morphosis quotes, "I think people involved in the drag scene know the questions that we're tired of answering. (...) No shade to the drag interviews out there, but I feel like a lot of the drag fans don't really care about that. They want to know deeper stuff. They want to know what your thoughts and opinions are. They watch my show, they want to know where you came from, what happened."

== Personal life ==
Maddy Morphosis' partner Jennifer Standridge is a former drag performer, known as Miss Liza. Maddy Morphosis identifies as heterosexual and cisgender, and uses the pronouns she/her when in drag. She has said, "I identify as a cisgender straight man, but I'm gender non-conforming in my presentation."

== Filmography ==
=== Television ===
Year	Title	Role	Place	Ref
2022	RuPaul's Drag Race (season 14)	Herself	Contestant (10th place)	
2022	RuPaul's Drag Race: Untucked	Herself	Contestant (10th place)	
2023	RuPaul's Drag Race (season 15)	Herself	Special guest; Episode: "Reunited!"	

=== Web series ===
Year	Title	Role	Notes	Ref
2022	Whatcha Packin'	Herself	Guest	
2022	Drag Us Weekly	Herself	Guest	
2023	Give It to Me Straight	Herself	Host	
2023	Death, Drag, and Decadence (with Bombae and Evah Destruction)	Herself		

- Bring Back My Girls (2023)

=== Music videos ===
Year	Title	Artist	Ref
2022	"GAGA"	Grace Gaustad	

== Awards and nominations ==
Year	Award-giving body	Category	Work	Results	Ref.
2022	Critics' Choice Real TV Awards	Best Ensemble Cast in an Unscripted Series (Shared with the Season 14 cast)	RuPaul's Drag Race	Won	

== See also ==
- List of people from Fayetteville, Arkansas
