= RuPaul's Drag Race =

American reality competition television series (since 2009)

- Genre: Reality competition
- Directed by: Nick Murray
- Presented by: RuPaul
- Starring: RuPaul's Drag Race contestants
- Judges: RuPaul; Michelle Visage; Ross Mathews; Carson Kressley; Ts Madison; Law Roach; Merle Ginsberg; Santino Rice; Billy B
- Theme music composer: RuPaul
- Opening theme: "RuPaul's Drag Race" theme
- Ending theme: List: "Cover Girl (Put the Bass in Your Walk)" (season 1); "Jealous of My Boogie" (season 2); "Main Event (Matt Pop 80's Tribute)" (season 3); "The Beginning" (seasons 4–5); "Dance with U" (season 6); "Fly Tonight" (season 7); "Die Tomorrow" (season 8); "Be Someone (Matt Pop Edit)" (season 9); "Kitty Girl" (season 9); "Rock It (To the Moon)" (seasons 10–11); "American" (season 12); "I'm a Winner, Baby" (season 13); "I'm a Winner, Baby (Skeltal Ki Remix)" (season 14); "A Little Bit of Love" (seasons 15–16); "Just What They Want" (season 17); "Good Luck and Don’t F**k It Up (Matt Pop Remix)" (season 18)
- Country of origin: United States
- Original language: English
- No. of seasons: 18
- No. of episodes: 254 (list of episodes)

Production
- Executive producers: Fenton Bailey; Randy Barbato; Tom Campbell; RuPaul Charles; Steven Corfe; Mandy Salangsang; Chris McKim
- Producers: Michelle Visage; John Polly
- Camera setup: Multi-camera
- Running time: 42–60 minutes
- Production company: World of Wonder

Original release
- Network: Logo TV
- Release: February 2, 2009 – May 16, 2016
- Network: VH1
- Release: March 24, 2017 – April 22, 2022
- Network: MTV
- Release: January 6, 2023 – present

Related
- RuPaul's Drag U; RuPaul's Drag Race All Stars; RuPaul's Secret Celebrity Drag Race; RuPaul's Drag Race Global All Stars

RuPaul's Drag Race is an American reality competition television series, the first in the Drag Race franchise, produced by World of Wonder for Logo TV (season 1–8), WOW Presents Plus, VH1 (season 9–14) and, beginning with the fifteenth season, MTV. The show documents RuPaul in the search for "America's next drag superstar". RuPaul plays the role of host, mentor, and head judge for this series, as contestants are given different challenges each week. Contestants are judged by a panel that includes RuPaul, Michelle Visage, one of four rotating judges (Carson Kressley, Ross Mathews, Ts Madison, or Law Roach), as well as one or more guest judges, who critique their progress throughout the competition. The title of the show is a play on drag queen and drag racing, and the title sequence and song "Drag Race" both have a drag-racing theme.

RuPaul's Drag Race has aired for eighteen seasons and inspired the spin-off shows RuPaul's Drag U, RuPaul's Drag Race All Stars, RuPaul's Secret Celebrity Drag Race, and RuPaul's Drag Race Global All Stars; the companion series RuPaul's Drag Race: Untucked; and numerous international franchises.

The show became the highest-rated television program on Logo TV, and airs internationally, including in Ireland, Spain, the United Kingdom, Australia, Canada, Mexico and Brazil. The show earned RuPaul eight consecutive Emmy Awards (2016 to 2023) for Outstanding Host for a Reality or Competition Program. The show has been awarded the Primetime Emmy Award for Outstanding Reality-Competition Program four consecutive times (2018 to 2021), and the Outstanding Reality Program Award at the GLAAD Media Awards. It has been nominated for five Critics' Choice Television Awards including Best Reality Series – Competition and Best Reality Show Host for RuPaul and numerous Creative Arts Emmy Awards.

== Format ==
Season 11 and All Stars 6 contestants Ra'Jah O'Hara (left) and Scarlet Envy (right) competing in a Lip Sync for Your Life

Prospective Drag Race contestants submit video auditions to the show's production company, World of Wonder. RuPaul, the host and head judge, views each tape and selects the season's competitors. The chosen contestants compete against each other in various challenges in filmed episodes. Each episode typically concludes with one contestant being eliminated from the competition, but there is occasionally a double elimination, no elimination, contestant disqualification, contestant voluntarily quitting, or removal of a contestant on medical grounds. Each episode features a so-called "maxi challenge" that tests competitors' skills in a variety of areas of drag performance. Some episodes also feature a "mini challenge", the prize of which is often an advantage or benefit in the upcoming maxi challenge. Contestants then present themed looks in a runway walk. RuPaul and a panel of judges critique each contestant's performance, deliberate among themselves, and announce the week's winner and bottom two competitors. The bottom two queens compete in a "Lip Sync for Your Life"; the winner of the lip sync remains in the competition, and the loser is eliminated. Generally, the contestant that the judges feel has displayed the most "charisma, uniqueness, nerve and talent" (C.U.N.T.) is the one who advances. The season's winner is crowned in a special finale episode with the final contestants remaining with the previous season's winner presenting the crown and scepter to the winner. In early seasons, the finale was pre-recorded in the studio with no audience. More recently, it has taken the form of a lip sync tournament before a live audience. The whole season is typically filmed in four weeks. The season 12 finale was filmed remotely due to the COVID-19 pandemic.

RuPaul ends episodes by saying, "If you can't love yourself, how in the hell are you going to love somebody else?" The phrase was inspired by RuPaul's mother.

=== Mini and maxi challenges ===
Mini challenges are quick, small assignments that RuPaul announces at the beginning of an episode. One of the most popular mini challenges, which has appeared in every season since season 2, except for season 12, is the reading challenge. In it, contestants satirically criticize one another in a process called "reading", popularized by the 1990 documentary film Paris Is Burning. Maxi challenges test a variety of skills. Some are group challenges that involve singing and acting, while others feature comedy, a talent of choice, dancing, or makeovers. The winner receives a material or monetary prize. Until midway through the fifth season, the winner sometimes also received immunity against elimination the following week. Drag Race's most popular seasonal maxi challenge is Snatch Game, a spoof on Match Game wherein contestants impersonate celebrities or famous fictional personas.

Recurring main challenges include "balls" (for which contestants must showcase multiple outfits, often including an original design made in the Werk Room), girl groups, makeovers, roasts, "Rusicals" (musical theatre), and Snatch Game. Over time, the ball challenge has replaced the "drag on a dime" challenge. The girl group challenge has become a "classic" and a season highlight because "it tests the contestant's ability to write a verse, choreograph a dance routine, remember that choreography, and most crucially, work with others in a team". Rusicals (portmanteau of "RuPaul" and "musical") began on the sixth season and have subsequently become "a highly anticipated staple" of the reality competition, allowing contestants to showcase their talents. Usually occurring midway through each Drag Race season, Snatch Game is widely considered among the most important and memorable challenges of the show and, in RuPaul's words, separates "the basic bitches from the fierce-ass queens". Contestants are also often tasked with demonstrating their acting and sewing skills on the show.

In 2022, Screen Rant said, "In the first few seasons of Drag Race, given the show's low budget and poor camera quality, the runway, particularly in displaying makeup and fashion looks, were not quite as prominent as it has been in more recent seasons. Instead, mini challenges at the start of the episode took up much more time and effort." Among recurring "mini-challenges", which can give contestants an advantage in the competition, is the "reading" challenge which tasks contestants with playfully insulting each other. The contest comes from the documentary film Paris Is Burning (1990). Played on most seasons of Drag Race, RuPaul introduces the challenge by reminding contestants that "reading is fundamental". Another recurring mini-challenge tasks contestants with using puppets.

=== Judging ===
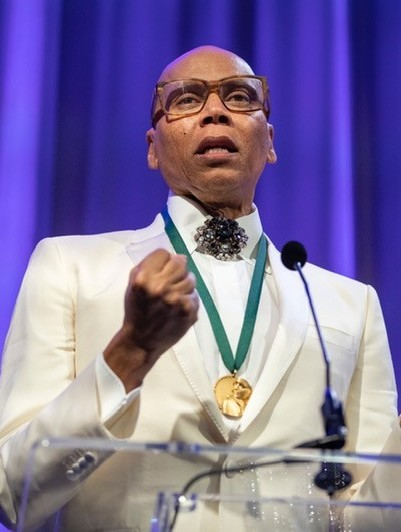
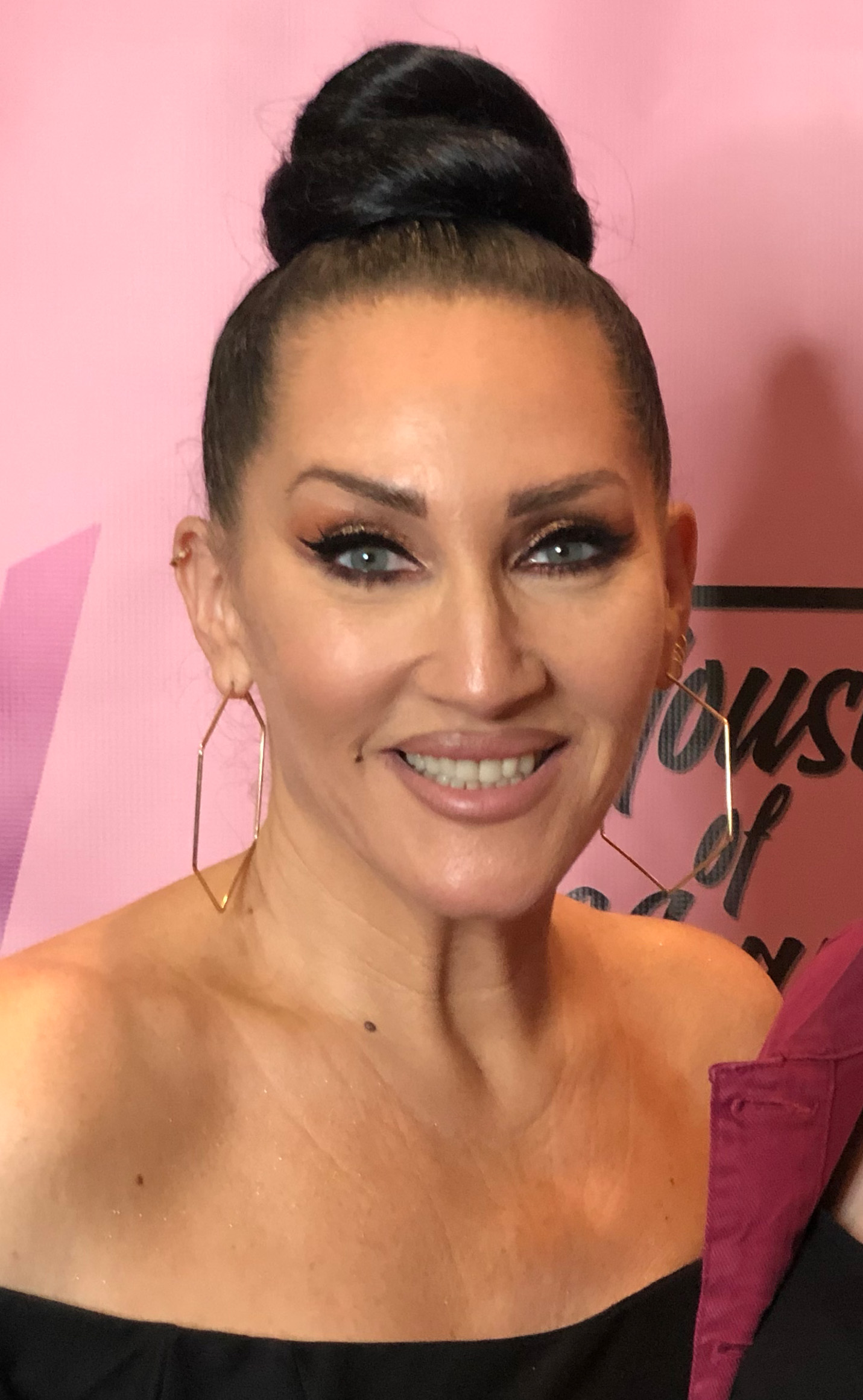
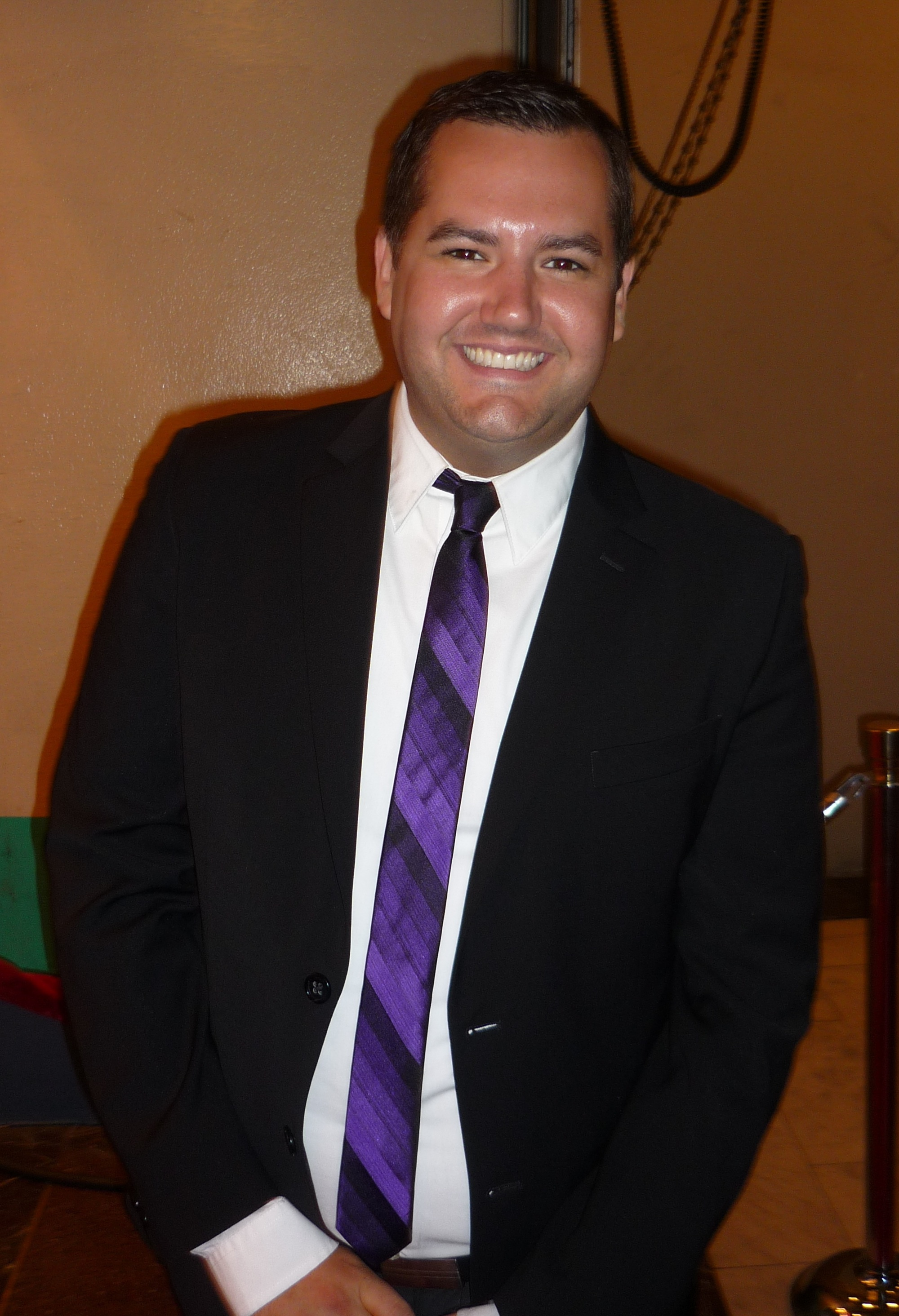
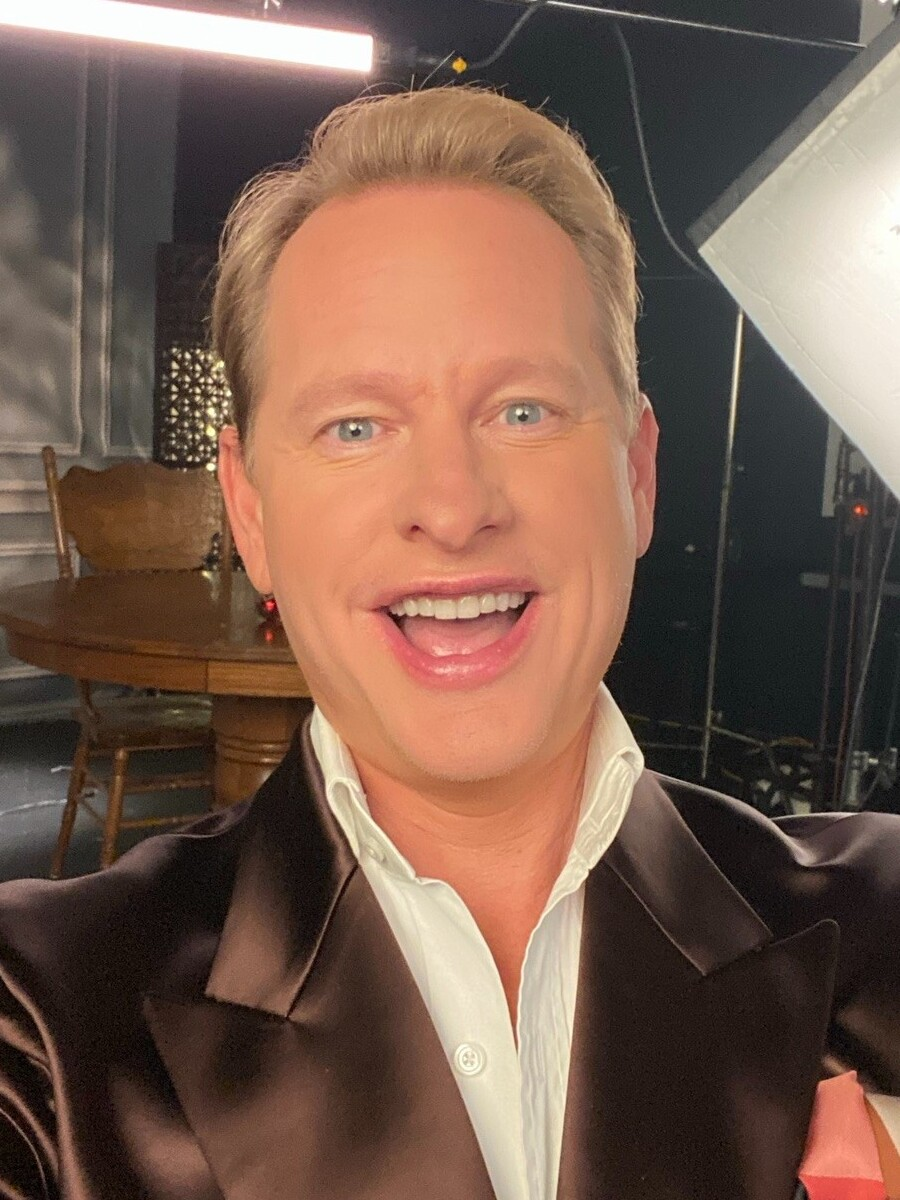
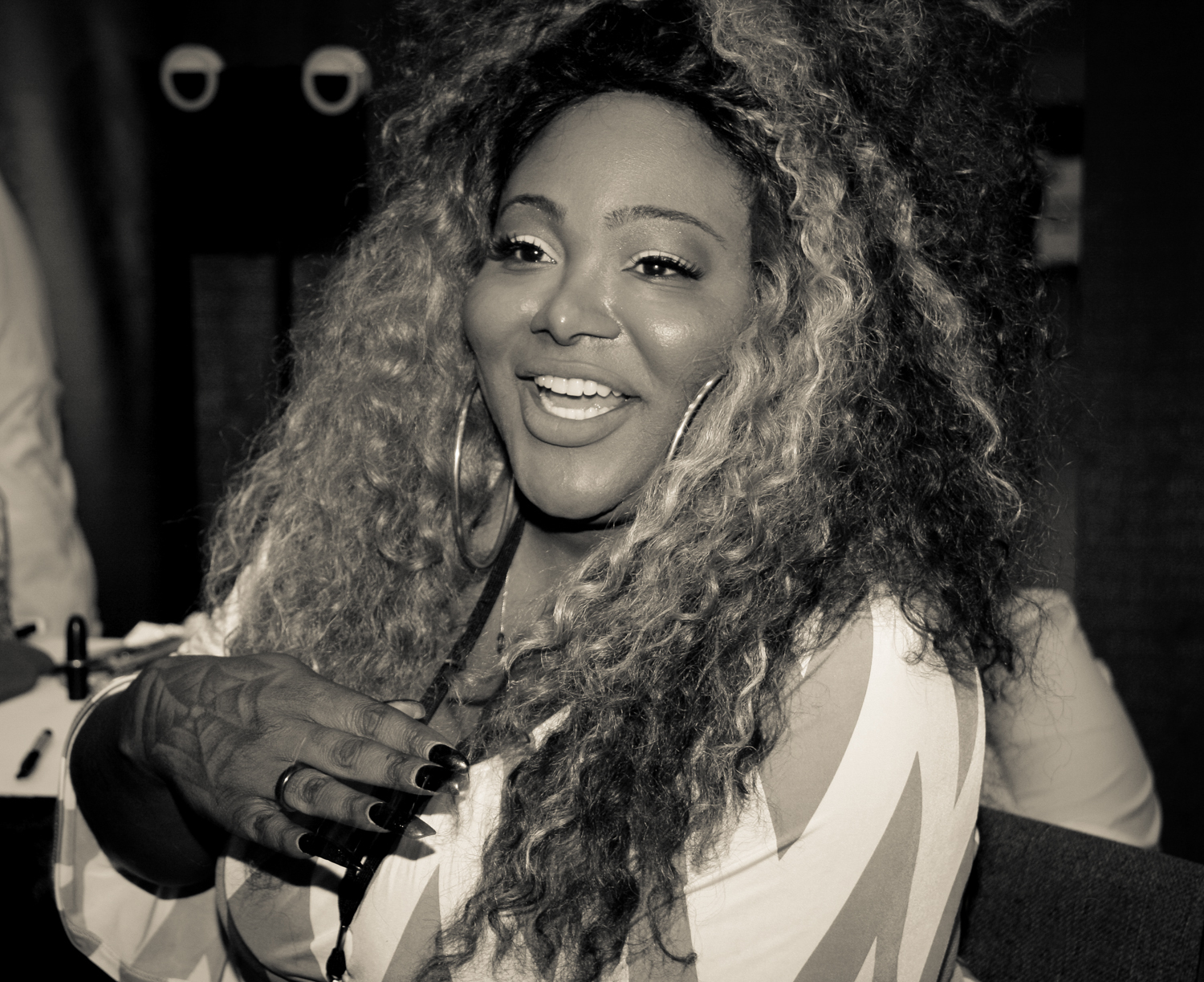
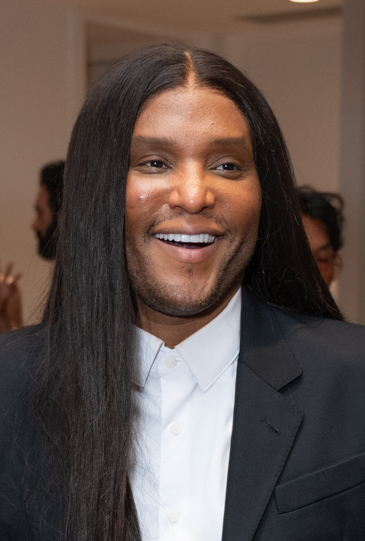
Judges RuPaul (top left), Michelle Visage (top right), Ross Mathews (middle left), Carson Kressley (middle right), Ts Madison (bottom left), and Law Roach (bottom right)

RuPaul has been the series' head judge since its premiere. For the first two seasons, Merle Ginsberg joined him on the panel; she was replaced in season 3 by Michelle Visage, a longtime friend of RuPaul and his co-host for The RuPaul Show. Santino Rice served as a judge for seasons 1 through 6. From season 7 onward, Ross Mathews and Carson Kressley replaced Rice, alternating in his former seat. New York City makeup artist Billy Brasfield (commonly known as Billy B) held a regular judging spot in the third and fourth seasons when Rice was absent. Most weeks, one or two celebrity guest judges join the panel. After appearing as a recurring guest judge in seasons 13 and 14, Ts Madison joined as an alternating judge from the fifteenth season. Law Roach appeared as a guest judge on season 16 then joined the judges panel as an alternating judge from the seventeenth season.

Former and recurring judges on RuPaul's Drag Race
Judge	Season																	
Judge	1	2	3	4	5	6	7	8	9	10	11	12	13	14	15	16	17	18
RuPaul	Main	Main	Main	Main	Main	Main	Main	Main	Main	Main	Main	Main	Main	Main	Main	Main	Main	Main
Santino Rice	Main	Main	Altern	Altern	Main	Main	Guest											
Merle Ginsberg	Main	Main					Guest											
Michelle Visage			Main	Main	Main	Main	Main	Main	Main	Main	Main	Main	Main	Main	Main	Main	Main	Main
Billy B			Altern	Altern														
Ross Mathews				Guest			Altern	Altern	Altern	Altern	Altern	Altern	Altern	Altern	Altern	Altern	Altern	Altern
Carson Kressley							Altern	Altern	Altern	Altern	Altern	Altern	Altern	Altern	Altern	Altern	Altern	Altern
Ts Madison													Guest	Guest	Altern	Altern	Altern	Altern
Law Roach																Guest	Altern	Altern
Jamal Sims							Guest	Guest			Guest	Guest	Guest			Guest	Altern	Altern

=== Companion series ===
The first season of Drag Race was accompanied by a seven-episode web series titled Under the Hood of RuPaul's Drag Race, which Logo TV streamed on its website. The series featured behind-the-scenes and deleted footage from the main show's tapes. From season 2 onward, a companion show called RuPaul's Drag Race: Untucked, which has the same premise, has aired instead. Untucked largely focuses on conversations and drama that occur between contestants backstage while the judges deliberate on each episode's results. In most seasons, it has aired on TV following the main show, but it was available only online for seasons 7 through 9. A number of smaller web series also accompany each episode. Whatcha Packin', which began at the start of the sixth season, features Michelle Visage interviewing the most recently eliminated queen about their run on the show and showcasing runway outfits they had brought but did not have the opportunity to wear. In 2014, the web series Fashion Photo RuView aired for the first time, co-hosted by Raja Gemini and Raven who evaluate the runway looks of the main show. Since season 8, a five- to fifteen-minute (later eighteen- to thirty-minute) aftershow called The Pit Stop has also been produced. It involves a host and guest, typically past competitors of Drag Race, discussing the recently aired episode. Each season's host (or hosts) are different; to date, these have included the YouTuber Kingsley, Raja Gemini, Bob the Drag Queen, Alaska Thunderfuck, Trixie Mattel, Manila Luzon, Monét X Change, and Bianca Del Rio.

Companion series
Show	Hosts
Fashion Photo RuView	Raja and Raven (Note: While Raja and Raven are the official hosts, due to scheduling conflicts they are not always both present in the same episode. Season-length guest hosts include Aquaria (season 11, All Stars 4), Asia O'Hara (All Stars 4), The Vivienne (UK series 1), Alexis Mateo (España season 1, Holland season 2, Canada season 2, España season 2), Nicky Doll (España season 1, Holland season 2 and Canada season 2), Bimini Bon-Boulash (UK series 3), Denali (UK series 3), Cheryl Hole (UK series 3), Gottmik (season 14, All Stars 7), Ra'Jah O'Hara (UK vs. the World), Shea Couleé (UK vs. the World), Choriza May (España season 2), Violet Chachki (season 7), Scarlet Envy and Adriana (France season 1), Ongina and Rock M. Sakura (Philippines season 1), Pangina Heals (UK series 4), Kerri Colby (All Stars 8), Lawrence Chaney (UK series 8), Nicole Paige Brooks and Marina Summers (Philippines season 4).)
The Pit Stop	Various (Note: Hosts include Kingsley (season 8), Raja (seasons 9 and 10, All Stars 2), Alaska (All Stars 3), Trixie Mattel (seasons 13 and 16, All Stars 4, 6 and 9, Canada season 1), Manila Luzon (season 11), Bob the Drag Queen (season 12, All Stars 5, 7 and 9), Monét X Change (seasons 14 and 17, All Stars 10), and Bianca Del Rio (season 15 and 18, All Stars 8 and 11).)
Whatcha Packin'	Michelle Visage
Extra Lap Recap	John Polly (Note: Vinegar Strokes filled in for the first seasons of Canada's Drag Race and Drag Race Holland, and Jackie Cox hosted for RuPaul's Drag Race UK series 2.)

== Series overview ==
RuPaul's Drag Race series overview
Season	Contestants	Episodes	Originally released			Winner	Runner(s)-up	Miss Congeniality
Season	Contestants	Episodes	First released	Last released	Network	Winner	Runner(s)-up	Miss Congeniality
1	9	9	February 2, 2009	March 23, 2009	Logo TV	BeBe Zahara Benet	Nina Flowers	Nina Flowers
2	12	12	February 1, 2010	April 26, 2010	Logo TV	Tyra Sanchez	Raven	Pandora Boxx
3	13	16	January 24, 2011	May 2, 2011	Logo TV	Raja	Manila Luzon	Yara Sofia
4	13	14	January 30, 2012	April 30, 2012	Logo TV	Sharon Needles	Chad Michaels; Phi Phi O'Hara	Latrice Royale
5	14	14	January 28, 2013	May 6, 2013	Logo TV	Jinkx Monsoon	Alaska; Roxxxy Andrews	Ivy Winters
6	14	14	February 24, 2014	May 19, 2014	Logo TV	Bianca Del Rio	Adore Delano; Courtney Act	BenDeLaCreme
7	14	14	March 2, 2015	June 1, 2015	Logo TV	Violet Chachki	Ginger Minj; Pearl	Katya
8	12	10	March 7, 2016	May 16, 2016	Logo TV	Bob the Drag Queen	Kim Chi; Naomi Smalls	Cynthia Lee Fontaine
9	14	14	March 24, 2017	June 23, 2017	VH1	Sasha Velour	Peppermint	Valentina
10	14	14	March 22, 2018	June 28, 2018	VH1	Aquaria	Eureka; Kameron Michaels	Monét X Change
11	15	14	February 28, 2019	May 30, 2019	VH1	Yvie Oddly	Brooke Lynn Hytes	Nina West
12	13	14	February 28, 2020	May 29, 2020	VH1	Jaida Essence Hall	Crystal Methyd; Gigi Goode	Heidi N Closet
13	13	16	January 1, 2021	April 23, 2021	VH1	Symone	Kandy Muse	LaLa Ri
14	14	16	January 7, 2022	April 22, 2022	VH1	Willow Pill	Lady Camden	Kornbread "The Snack" Jeté
15	16	16	January 6, 2023	April 14, 2023	MTV	Sasha Colby	Anetra	Malaysia Babydoll Foxx
16	14	16	January 5, 2024	April 19, 2024	MTV	Nymphia Wind	Sapphira Cristál	Sapphira Cristál; Xunami Muse
17	14	16	January 3, 2025	April 18, 2025	MTV	Onya Nurve	Jewels Sparkles	Crystal Envy
18	14	16	January 2, 2026	April 17, 2026	MTV	Myki Meeks	Nini Coco	Jane Don't

=== Seasons 1–8 (2009–2016): Logo TV ===
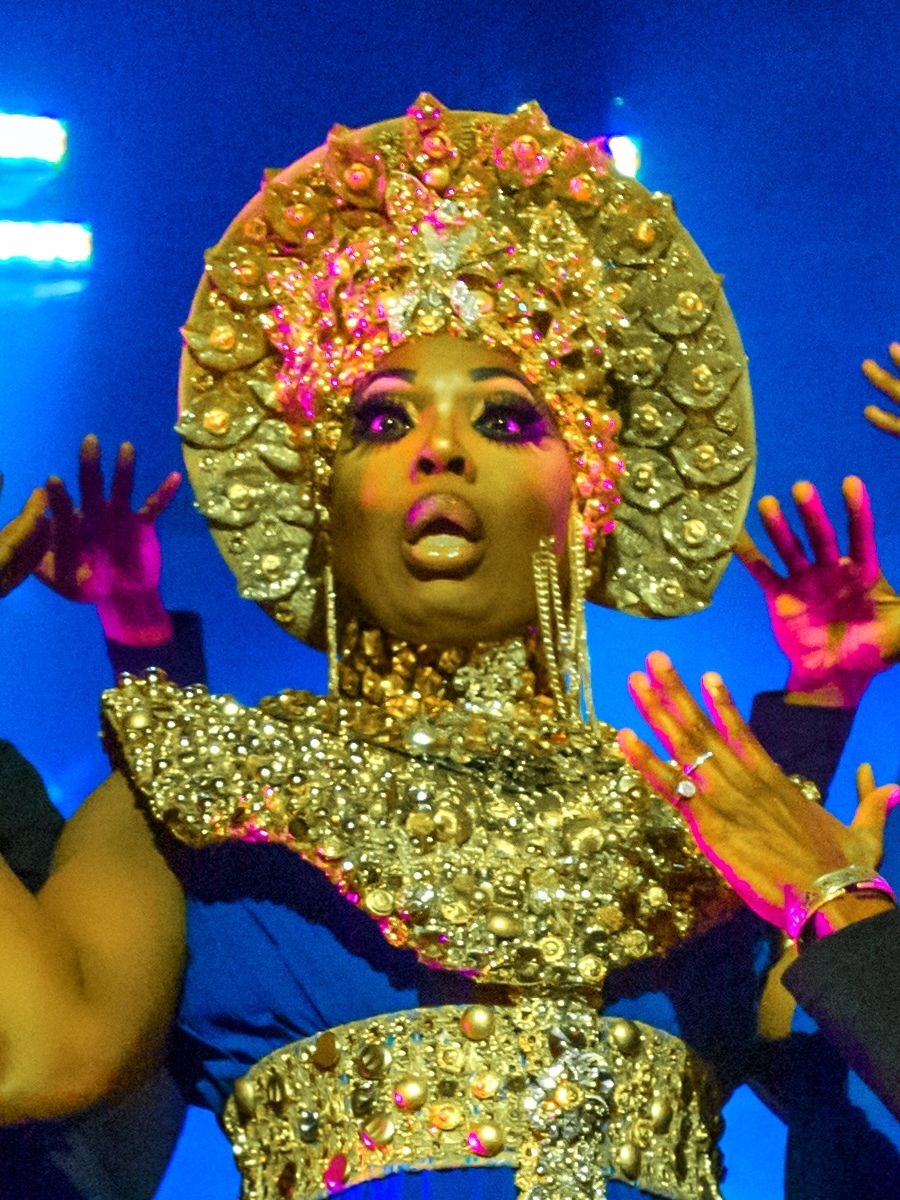
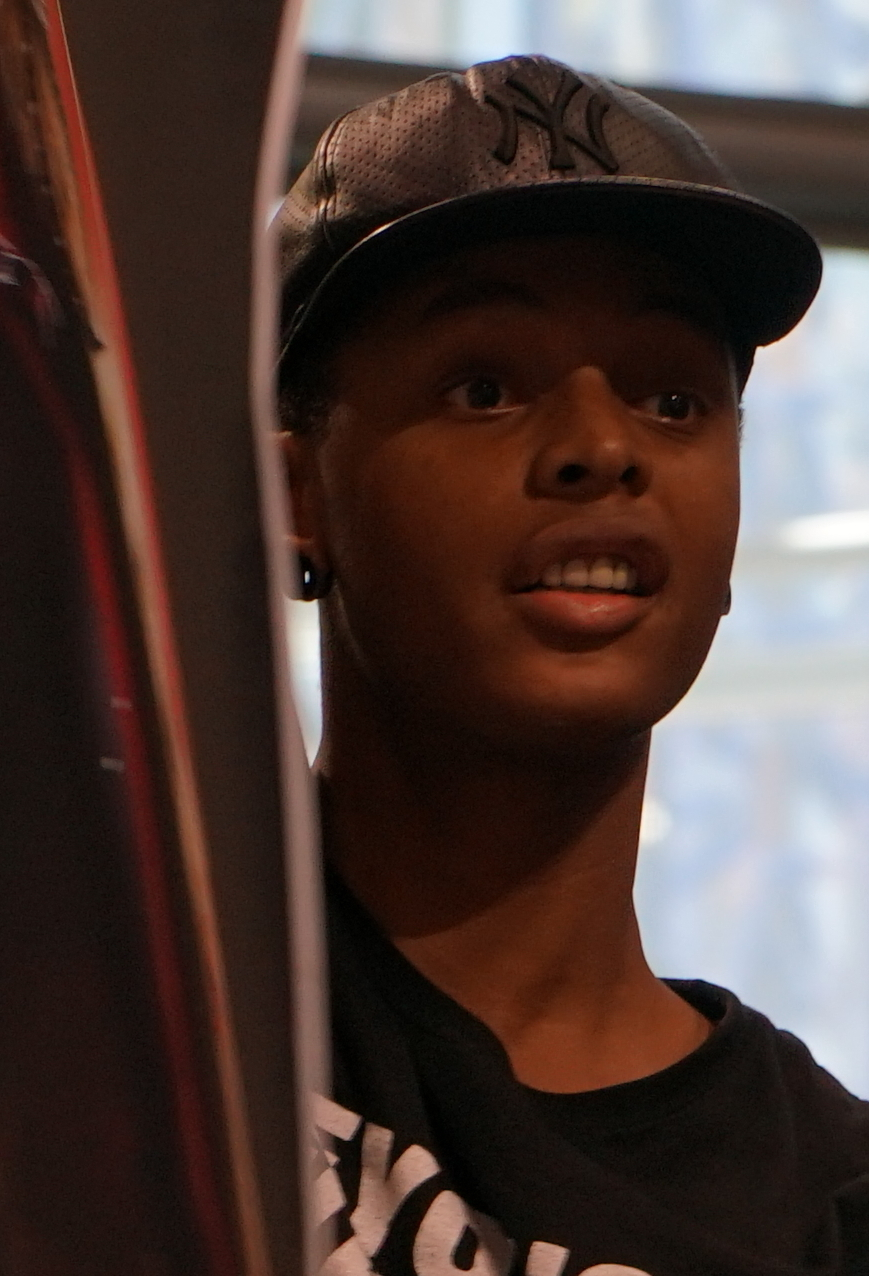
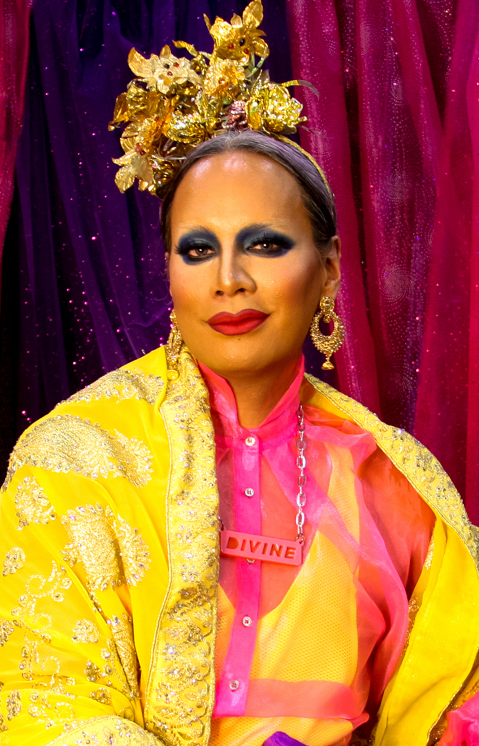
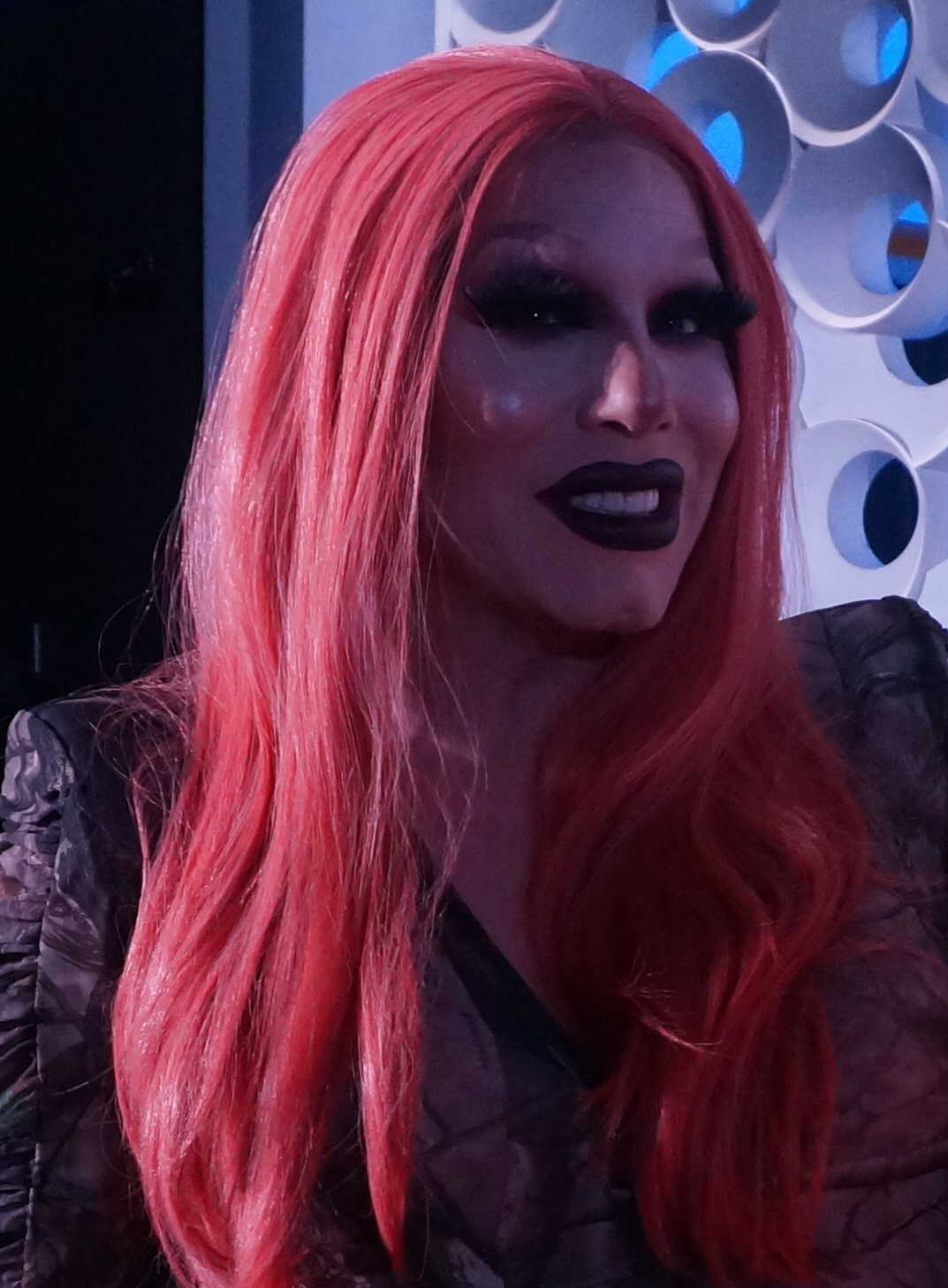
BeBe Zahara Benet (top left), Tyra Sanchez (top right), Raja (bottom left), and Sharon Needles (bottom right), the winners of seasons 1, 2, 3, and 4, respectively

Season 1 premiered in the U.S. on February 2, 2009, on Logo TV. Nine contestants competed to become "America's Next Drag Superstar". In late 2013, Logo re-aired the season as RuPaul's Drag Race: The Lost Season Ru-Vealed, featuring commentary from RuPaul.

For season 2 (2010), 12 contestants competed on the show. A new tradition of writing a farewell message in lipstick on the workstation mirror was started by the first eliminated queen, Shangela. Each week's episode is followed by a behind-the-scenes show, RuPaul's Drag Race: Untucked.

Season 3 (2011) had Michelle Visage replacing Merle Ginsberg on the judging panel as well as Billy Brasfield (commonly known as Billy B), Mike Ruiz, and Jeffrey Moran filling in for Santino Rice's absence during several episodes. Due to Billy B's continued appearances, he and Rice are considered to have been alternate judges for the same seat on judges panel. Other changes included the introduction of a wildcard contestant from the past season, Shangela; an episode with no elimination; and a contestant, Carmen Carrera, being brought back into the competition after having been eliminated a few episodes prior. A new pit crew was also introduced consisting of Jason Carter and Shawn Morales.

Season 4 began airing on January 30, 2012, with cast members announced November 13, 2011. Like the previous season, Rice and Billy B alternated the same seat at the judges table, with Brasfield filling in for Rice when needed.

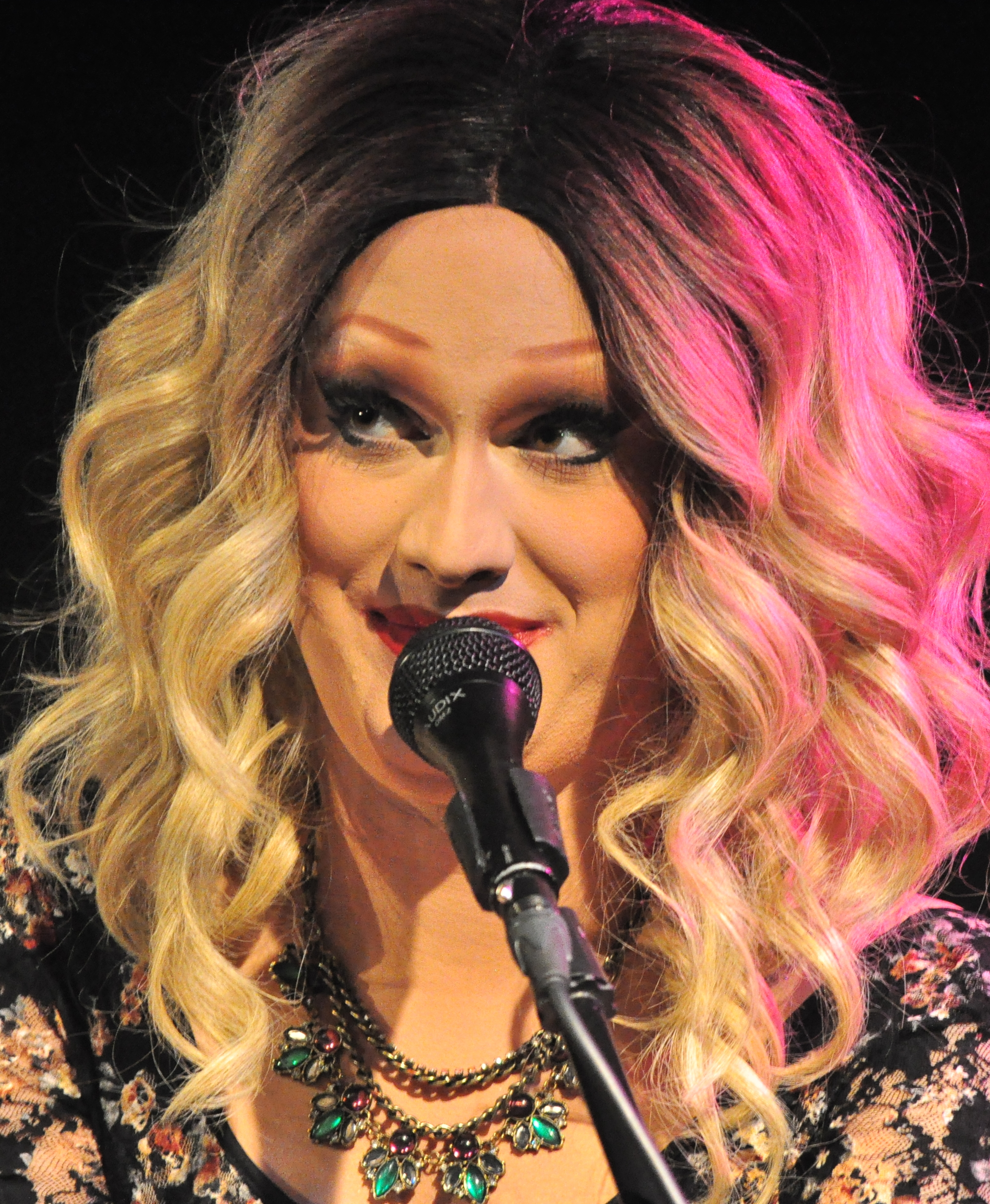
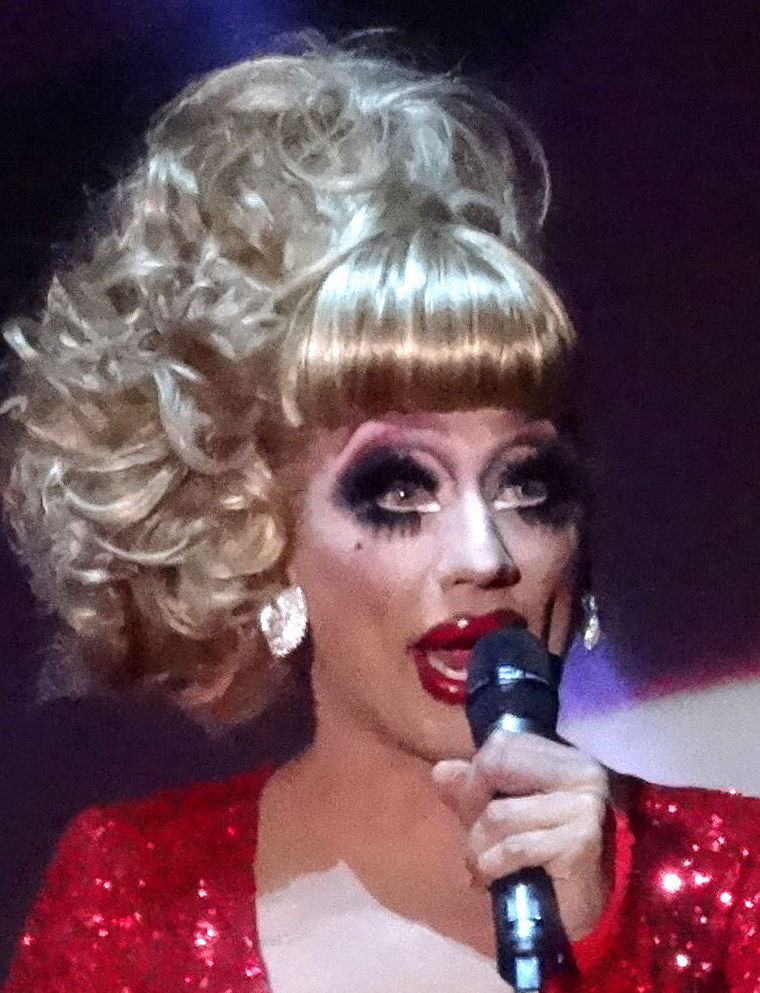
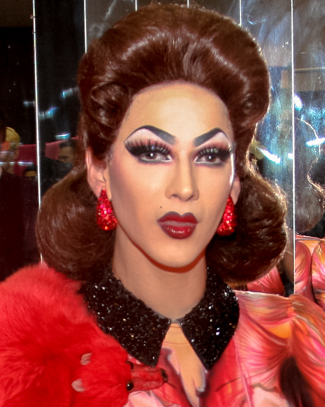
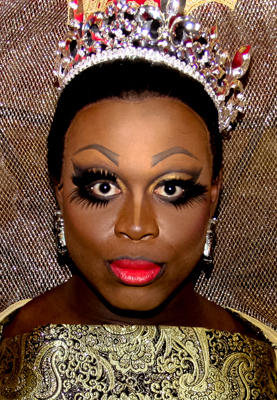
Jinkx Monsoon (top left), Bianca Del Rio (top right), Violet Chachki (bottom left), and Bob The Drag Queen (bottom right), the winners of seasons 5, 6, 7, and 8, respectively

Season 5 began airing on January 28, 2013, with a 90-minute premiere episode and fourteen contestants Rice and Visage were back as judges on the panel.

Season 6 began airing February 24, 2014. For the first time, the season premiere was split into two episodes; the 14 queens are split into two groups and the seven queens in each group compete against one another before being united as one group in the third episode. Rice and Visage returned as judges at the panel. Two new pit crew members, Miles Moody and Simon Sherry-Wood, joined Carter and Morales.

Season 7 began airing on March 2, 2015. Returning judges included RuPaul and Visage, while the Rice's space was filled by new additions Ross Mathews and Carson Kressley, who were both present for the season premiere and then took turns sharing judging responsibilities. Morales and Simon Sherry-Wood did not appear this season and were replaced by Bryce Eilenberg. The season premiere debuted with a live and same-day viewership of 348,000, a 20 percent increase from the previous season. On March 20, 2015, Logo announced it had given the series an early renewal for an eighth season.

Season 8 on began airing on March 7, 2016, with cast members announced during the NewNowNext Honors on February 1, 2016. Visage returned as a main judge, while Kressley and Mathews returned as rotating main judges. The first episode celebrated the 100th taping of the show and the 100th drag queen to compete.

=== Seasons 9–14 (2017–2022): VH1 ===
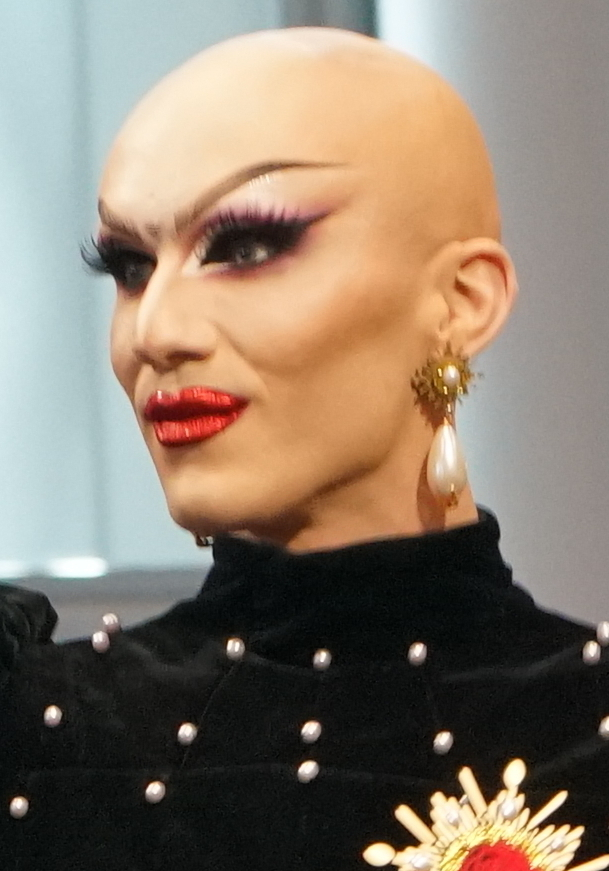
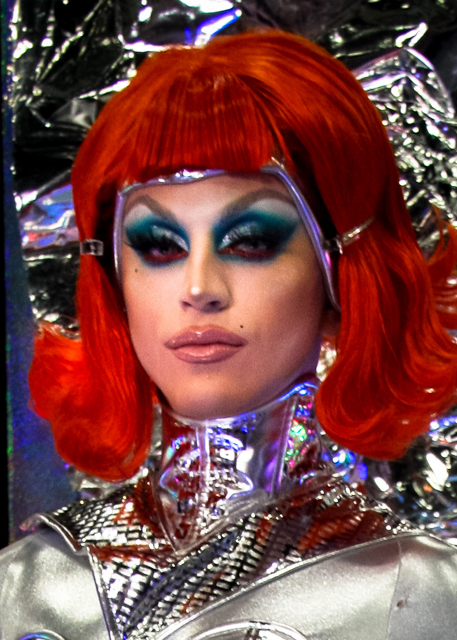
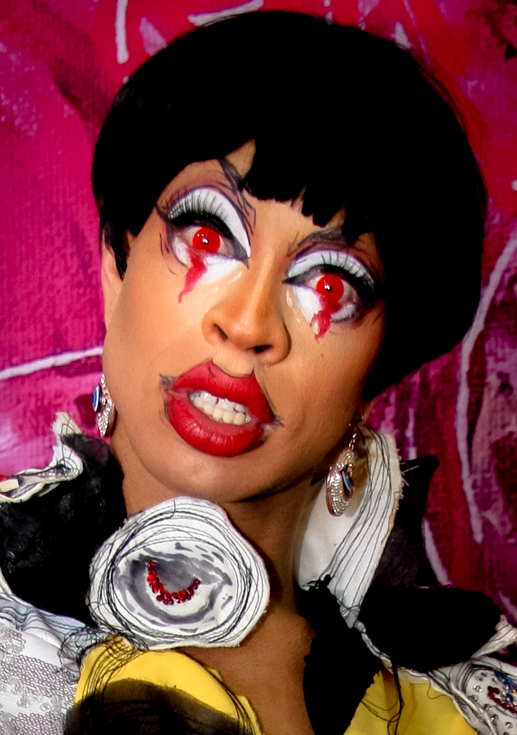
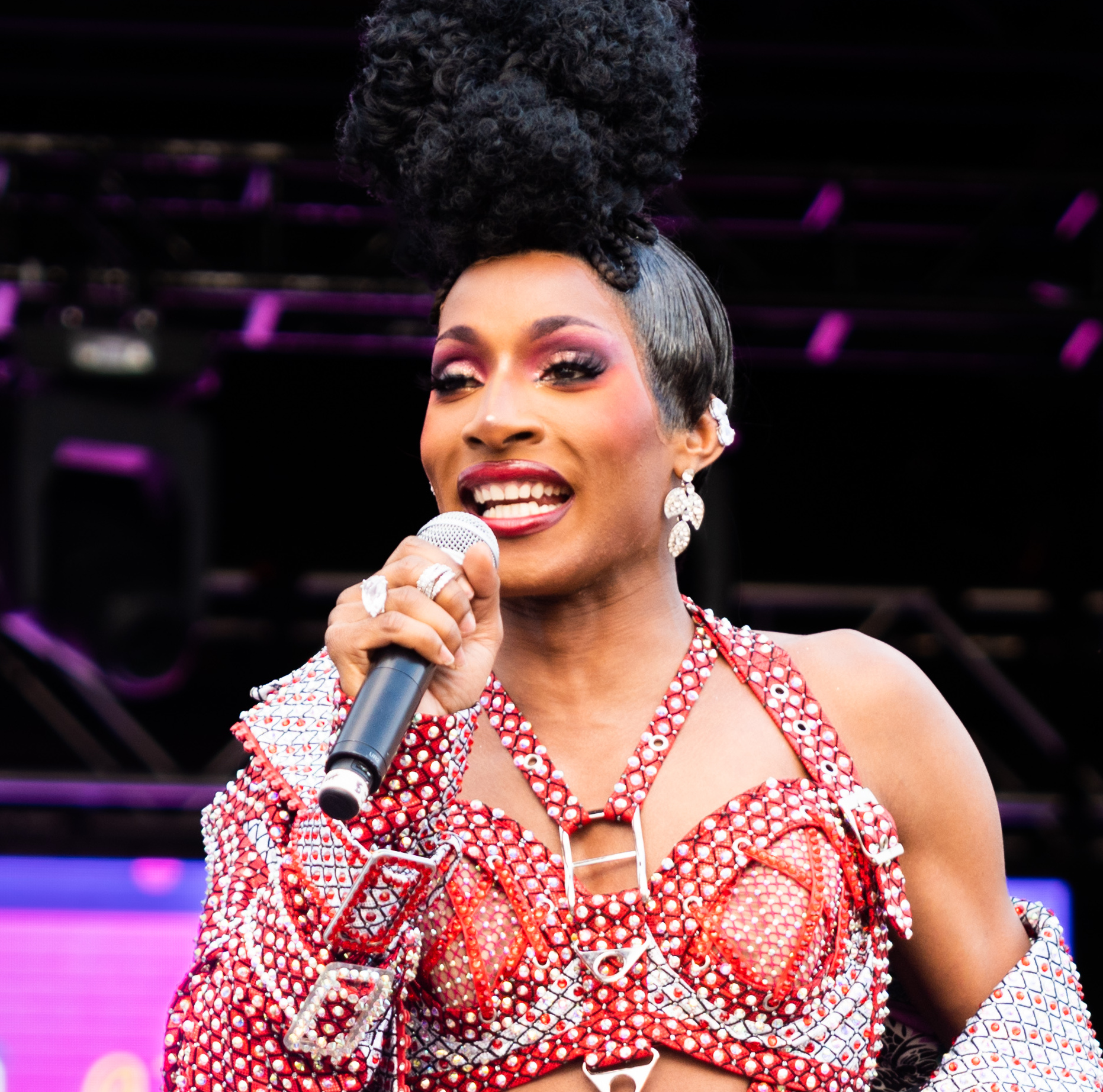
Sasha Velour (top left), Aquaria (top right), Yvie Oddly (bottom left), and Jaida Essence Hall (bottom right), the winners of seasons 9, 10, 11, and 12, respectively

Season 9 began airing on March 24, 2017, on VH1, with cast members announced on February 2, 2017. Visage returned as a main judge, and Kressley and Mathews returned as rotating main judges. Encore presentations continued to air on Logo. This season featured the return of Cynthia Lee Fontaine, who previously participated in the season 8. Season 9 featured a top four in the finale episode, as opposed to the top three, which was previously established in season 4.

Season 10 began airing on March 22, 2018. Visage returned as a main judge, and Kressley and Mathews returned as rotating main judges. Eureka O'Hara, who was removed from the ninth season due to an injury, returned to the show. Season 10 premiered alongside the televised return of Untucked. The tenth season featured a top four following the previous season's finale format.

Season 11 began airing February 28, 2019. This season had fifteen contestants. Visage returned as a main judge, and Kressley and Mathews returned as rotating main judges. This season saw the return of Vanessa Vanjie Mateo, who was the first contestant eliminated in season 10. Season 11 again featured a top four in the finale. As with season 10, each week's episode was followed by an episode of the televised return of RuPaul's Drag Race: Untucked.

On January 22, 2019, casting for Season 12 (2020) was announced via YouTube and Twitter and was closed on March 1, 2019. On August 19, 2019, it was announced that the series had been renewed for a twelfth season. The season began airing on February 28, 2020. This is the only season to have the reunion and finale recorded virtually from the contestants' homes due to the COVID-19 pandemic.

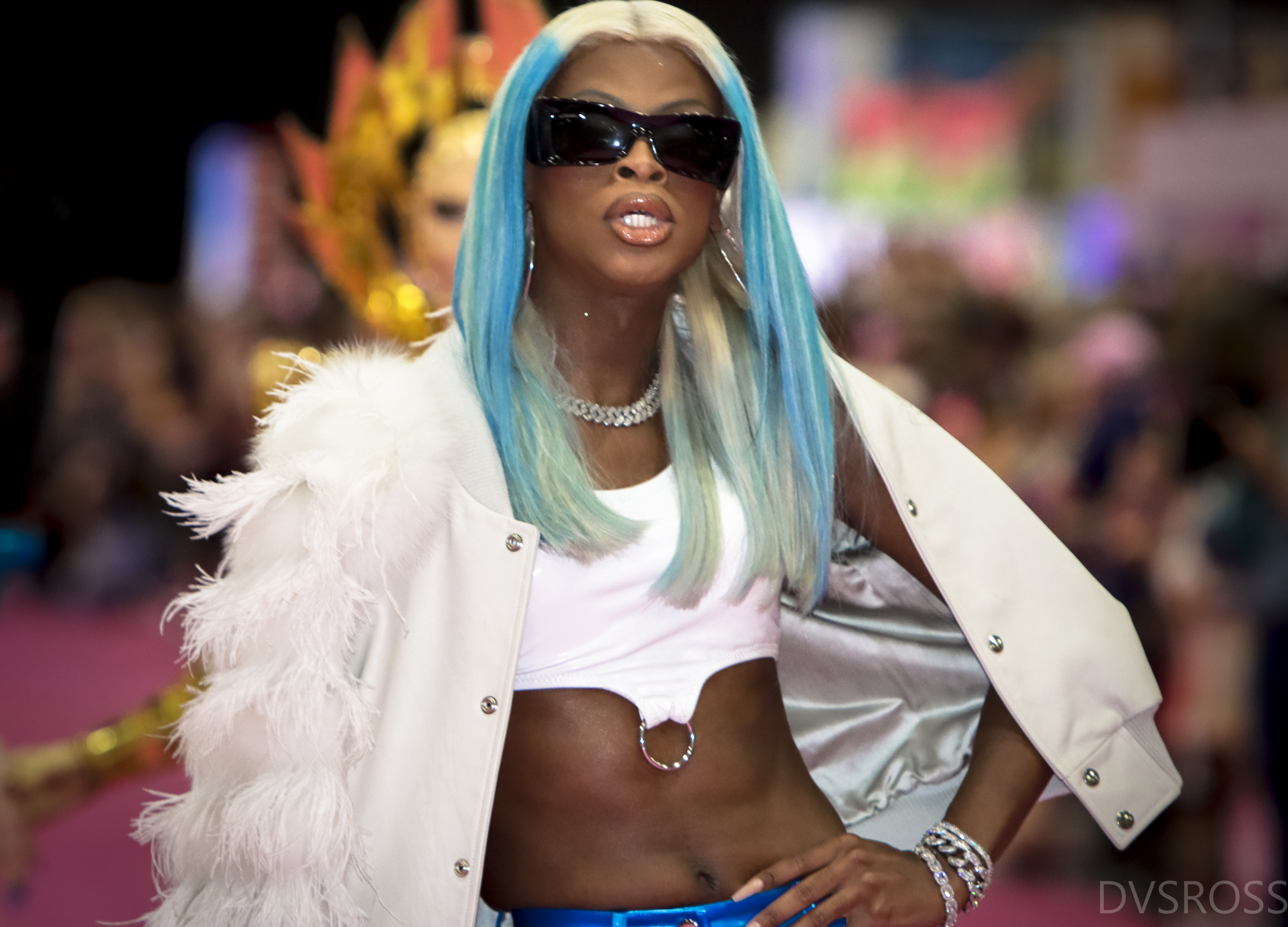
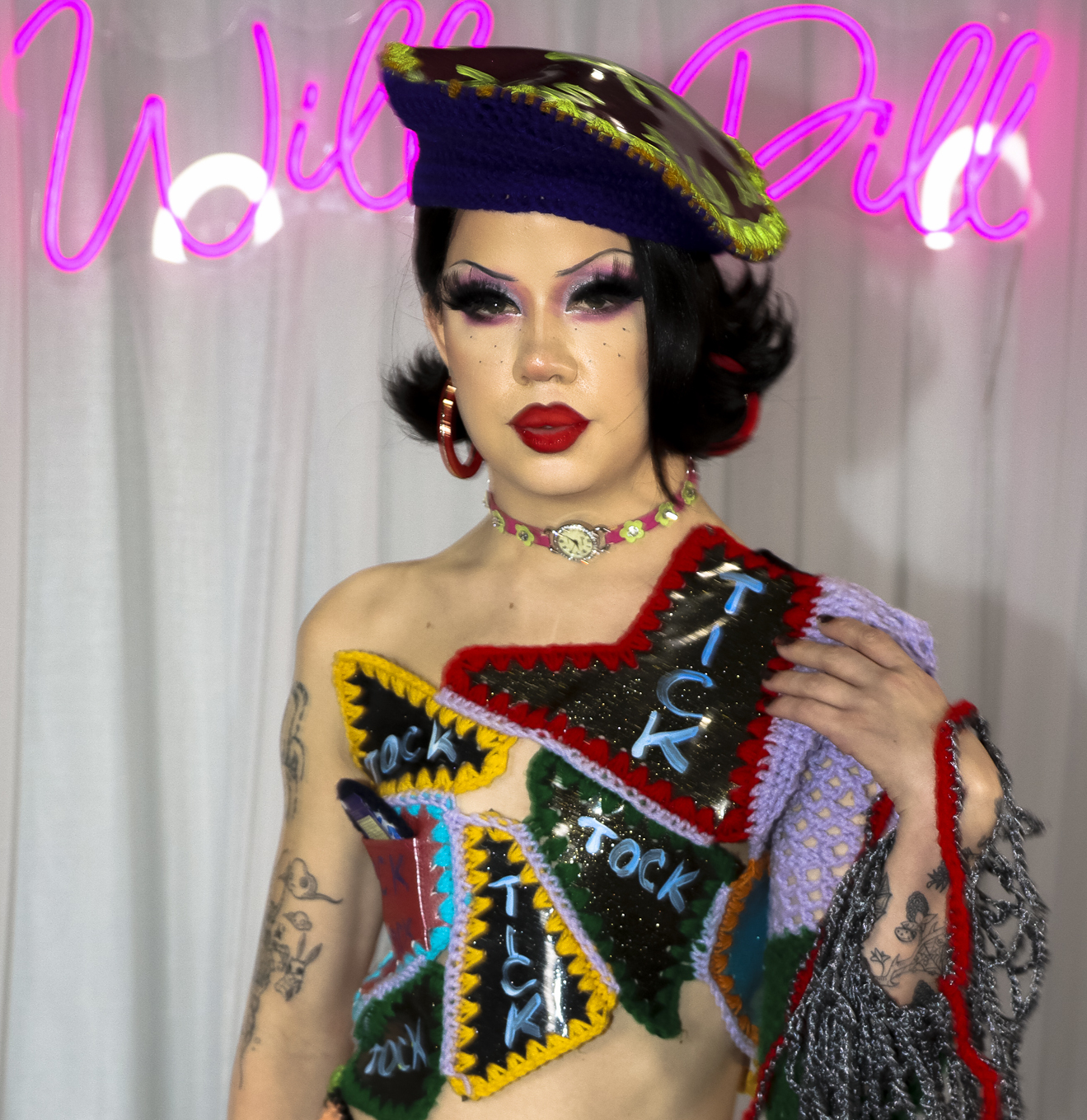
Symone (left) and Willow Pill (right), the winners of seasons 13 and 14, respectively

On December 2, 2019, casting for Season 13 (2021) was announced via YouTube and Twitter. The casting call closed on January 24, 2020. On August 20, 2020, it was announced the thirteenth season had been ordered by VH1. It began airing on January 1, 2021.

Casting for Season 14 began on November 23, 2020. In August 2021, it was announced the fourteenth season had been ordered by VH1. The cast for the fourteenth season was revealed through VH1 on December 2, 2021. The season started airing on January 7, 2022. The season welcomed Maddy Morphosis, the show's first heterosexual, cisgender male contestant. The season notably also featured five transgender contestants: Kerri Colby and Kornbread "The Snack" Jeté (both of whom entered the competition openly trans), Jasmine Kennedie (who came out as a trans woman during filming of the show), Bosco (who also came out as a trans woman as the season aired), and Willow Pill (who came out as trans femme as the season aired). The winning queen received $150,000, the highest amount awarded to date in a regular season. The runner-up received a $50,000 cash prize for the first time.

Casting for Season 15 began on November 4, 2021, and closed on January 7, 2022.

=== Seasons 15–18 (2023–present): MTV ===
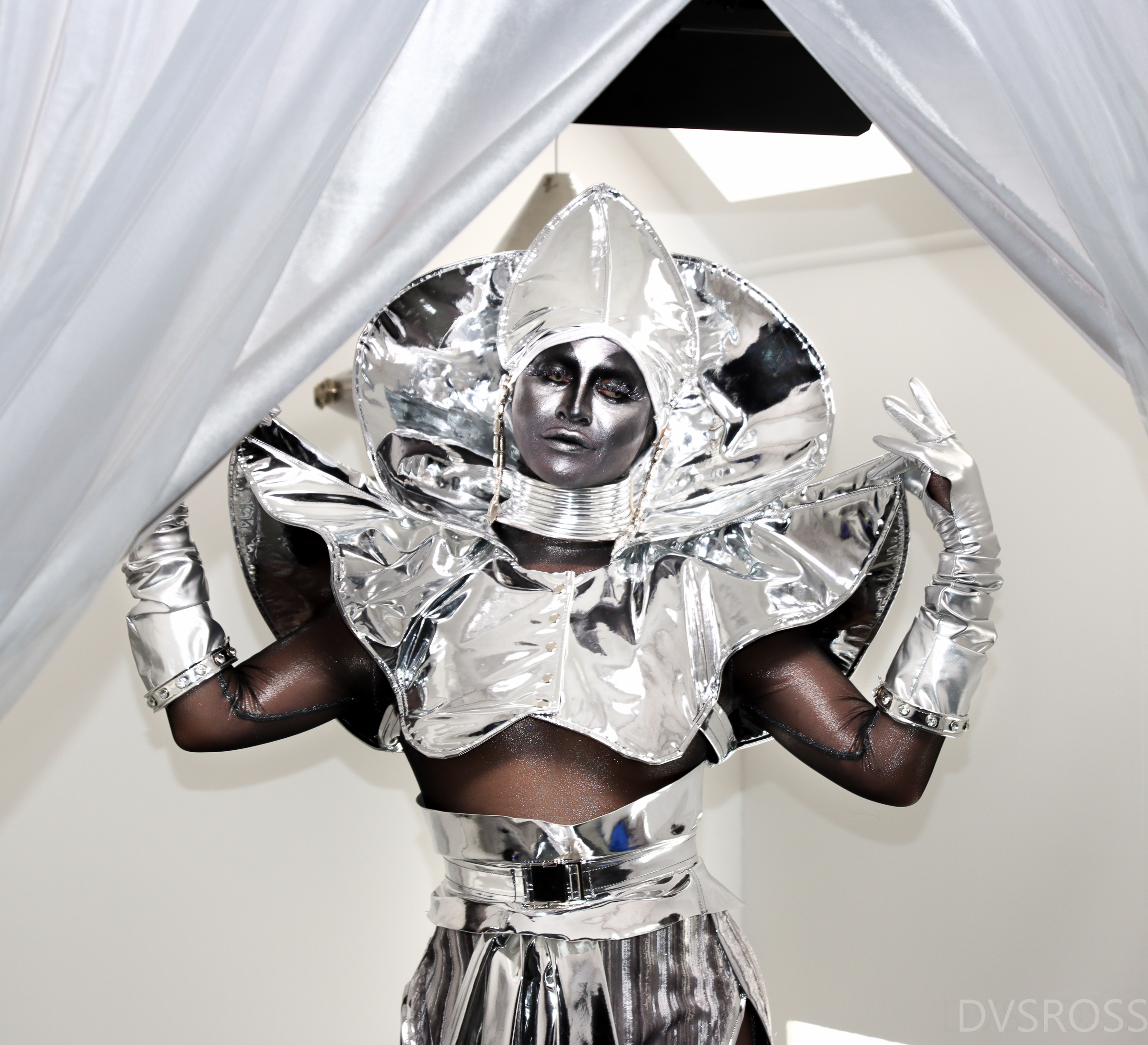
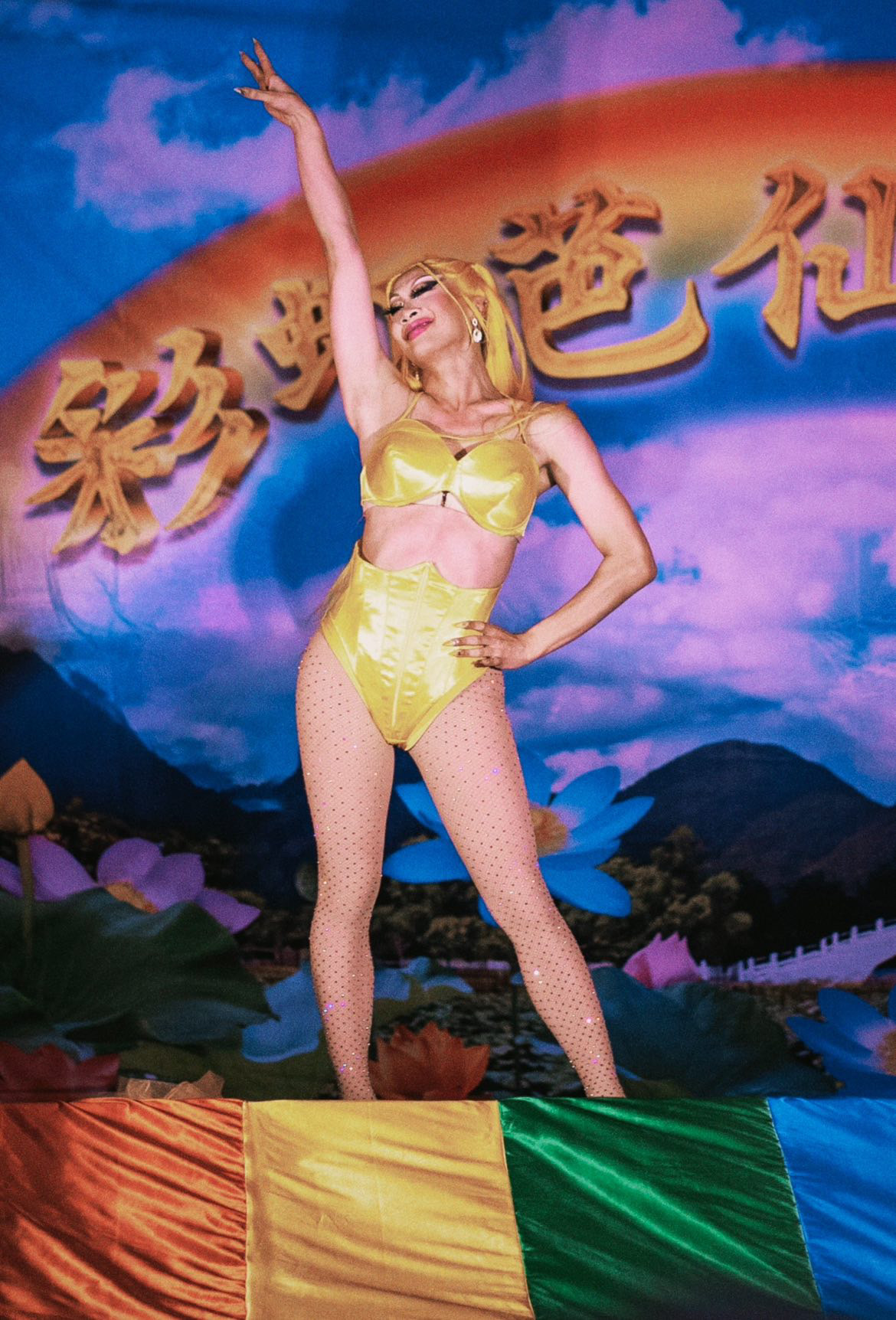
Sasha Colby (left) and Nymphia Wind (right), the winners of seasons 15 and 16, respectively

Season 15 premiered on January 6, 2023, on MTV. This season features the largest cast in the show's history, with sixteen queens competing, and the largest cash prize, with the winner earning $200,000. It is also the first season to feature biological relatives, twins Sugar and Spice.

Season 16 premiered on January 5, 2024, on MTV. This season introduced a LaLaPaRuZa Lip-Sync Smackdown competition for the eliminated queens that took place before the finale. Morphine Love Dion, who placed fifth in the main competition, won the smackdown and the title of Queen of She Done Already Done Had Herses alongside a $50,000 prize. Also for the first time, the finalists who did not win received a cash tip of $25,000 each.

Season 17 premiered on January 3, 2025. The season was won by Onya Nurve on 19 April 2025. She won a $250,000 grand prize. Suzie Toot won the Lip Sync LaLaPaRuza and earned the title of 'Queen of She Done Already Done Had Herses' and a prize of $50,000.

Season 18 premiered on January 2, 2026. The season was won by Myki Meeks on 17 April 2026. She won a $250,000 grand prize. Juicy Love Dion won the Lip Sync LaLaPaRuza and earned the title of 'Queen of She Done Already Done Had Herses' alongside a $50,000 prize.

=== Prizes ===
The winner of each season is crowned with the title of "America's Next Drag Superstar". The winner also receives a cash prize of $20,000 in season 1, $25,000 in season 2, $75,000 in season 3, $100,000 in seasons 4–13, $150,000 in season 14, and $200,000 in seasons 15–18. Cosmetics sponsors provide a make-up prize: a lifetime supply of MAC Cosmetics in season 1, a lifetime supply of NYX Cosmetics in seasons 2 and 4, a lifetime supply from Kryolan in season 3, a collection from ColorEvolution in seasons 5–6, and a one-year supply from Anastasia Beverly Hills since season 7–17, which later developed into a collaboration with the latter brand to create a cosmetics line since season 18.

Additional prizes included headlining the Drag Race tour featuring Absolut Vodka in seasons 1–5, appearance in an L.A. Eyeworks campaign in seasons 1 and 2, an exclusive one-year public relations contract with LGBTQ firm Project Publicity in season 2, a trip courtesy of AlandChuck.travel in seasons 4–5.

== Contestants ==
More than 200 contestants have competed on the American version of the show.

== Production ==
=== Conception and development ===
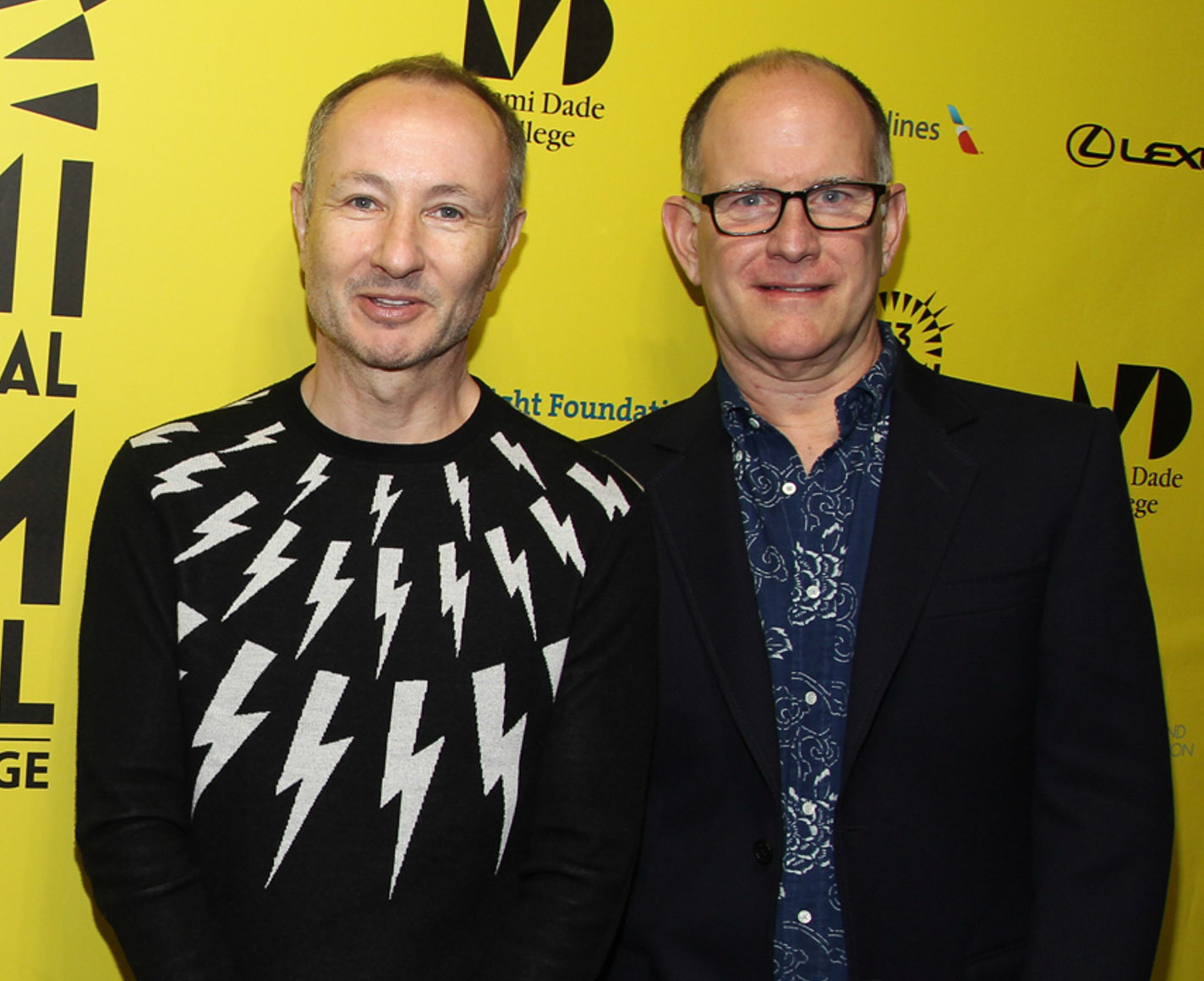
Fenton Bailey (left) and Randy Barbato (right), founders of the production company World of Wonder

Vulture said in 2017, "The road to Drag Race was paved 32 years ago at a music seminar in Manhattan, when 24-year-old RuPaul met Randy Barbato and Fenton Bailey, the founders of World of Wonder Productions, who would become his managers and best friends... Barbato started conversations with RuPaul about a reality show in 2004, around the time he and his frequent collaborator, Michelle Visage, began co-hosting a morning radio show in New York... When Tom Campbell, a development executive who had worked at MTV, Warner Bros. Television, New Line Television, and ABC, joined World of Wonder two years later as head of development, he broached the subject with the drag star again."

According to Vulture, Campbell (who became World of Wonder's chief creative officer), "came up with the show's format and its titular pun, while the producers and RuPaul came up with challenges, based on obstacles the drag star faced early in his career". Drag Race borrowed from other reality television show formats, including those of America's Next Top Model, Project Runway, and the World of Wonder series ¡Viva Hollywood! According to the Australian Broadcasting Corporation, "The show's format draws inspiration from 1980s Harlem drag balls and the performances of subversive drag collectives of the 1960s. In Ru's TV version, queens duke it out each week in various acting, fashion and improvisation challenges, and strut their themed looks down the runway before a lip sync showdown to decide who should 'shantay' or 'sashay away'."

=== Executive production and directing ===
The show has had several executive producers, including Bailey, Barbato, Tom Campbell, Steven Corfe, Tim Palazzola, Jen Passovoy, John Polly, Pamela Post, RuPaul, Mandy Salangsang (also co-showrunner), and Michael Seligman have also been producers. Jacqueline Wilson was also a producer, prior to her death.

Nick Murray is a director; his work on the series has earned him seven consecutive nominations for the Primetime Emmy Award for Outstanding Directing for a Reality Program, winning twice; in 2018 and 2023, for the episodes "10s Across the Board" from the tenth season and "Gettin' Lucky" from the thirteenth season, respectively.

=== Casting ===
Thousands of applications to compete on the series are submitted each season. In most cases, hopeful candidates submit audition tapes, though there have been exceptions. Penny Tration, who competed on the fifth season (2013), was cast after being selected "Fan Pick" on social media. Hormona Lisa, who was cast for the seventeenth season (2025), notably gave her audition tape to RuPaul in front of a live audience at a book tour stop. Screen Rant said, "Unfortunately, many drag performers make the mistake of sending audition tapes showing only what they think Drag Race producers are looking for." RuPaul has said of the audition process, "Everyone does the exact same thing. They behave in a way that they think I want them to behave. But the people who stick out are the ones who are authentic and are really just being themselves."

According to Screen Rant, "Casting decisions are not only hidden from the public. When the contestants arrive, producers separate them until filming begins. Even in the comfort of their own hotel room they have to be careful not to catch a glimpse of their fellow competitors. It is not until they step into the Werk Room that they discover who they will be competing against. Their surprised reactions to their cast mates are therefore some of the realest moments on RuPaul's Drag Race."

Casting is directed by Casting Firm, which was founded by Goloka Bolte and Ethan Peterson.

=== Filming ===
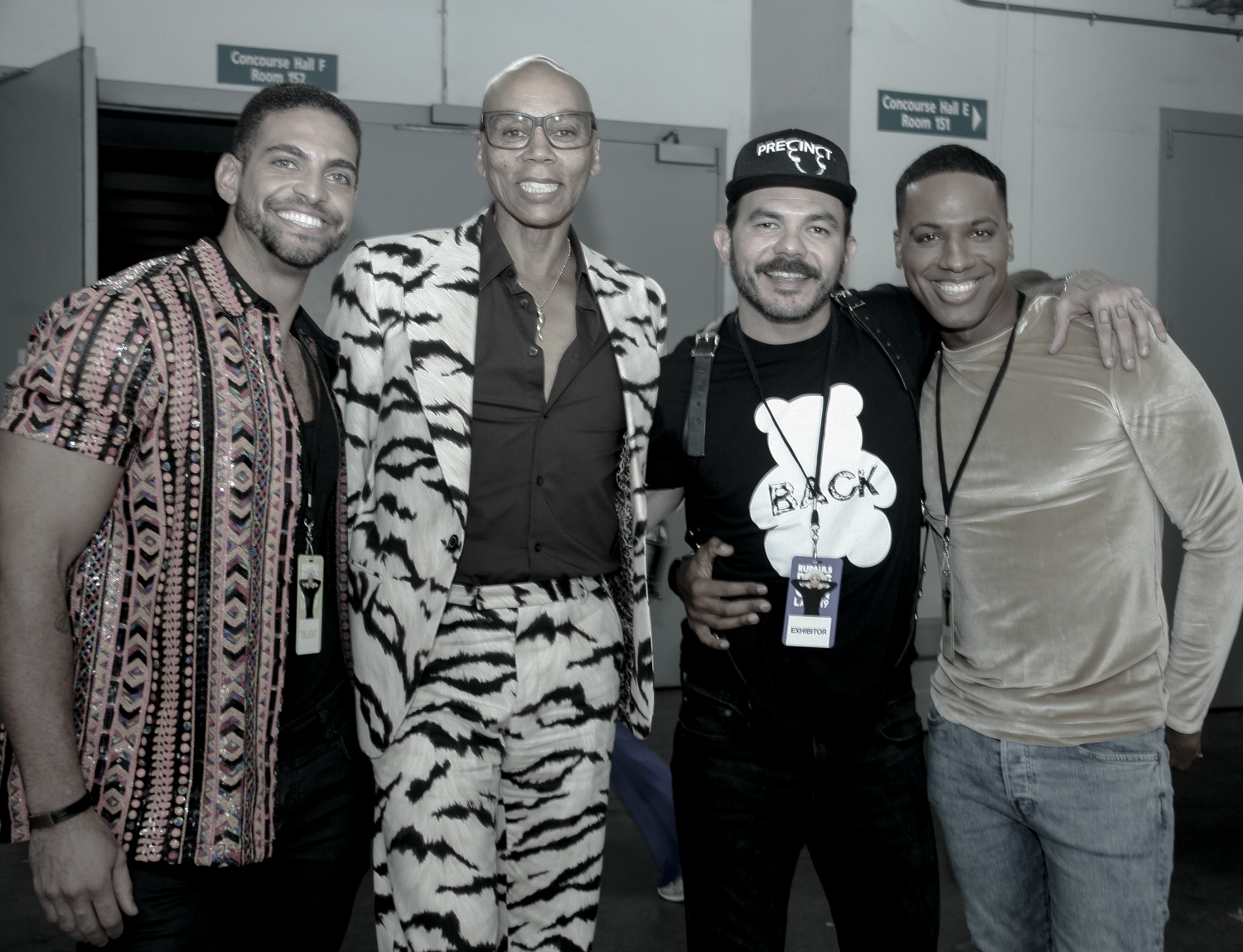
Pit Crew members with RuPaul (second from left), including Shawn Morales (second from right), at RuPaul's DragCon LA in 2019

Contestants are secluded and stay in a hotel during production. According to Screen Rant, "The show tries to keep each season's cast strictly confidential. Contestants cannot tell anyone that they will be participating, and they must make up lies to their loved ones about their whereabouts." Contestants are asked to bring dozens of outfits and cannot use phones, radios, tablets, or televisions while filming. An exception is the ability to use an iPod with songs planned to be used for lip-sync contests. Willam was disqualified for violating production rules while taping the fourth season. When filming fashion shows, contestants have two chances to walk the runway on the main stage. Since Mimi Imfurst picked up India Ferrah during a lip-sync on the third season (2011), RuPaul has declared that "drag is not a contact sport", meaning contestants should not be physically aggressive towards each other. Since news leaked about Raja's win ahead of the third season's finale, multiple endings are filmed for each season. Contestants learn who won the season when the finale airs.

The show's first season (2009), sometimes called "The Lost Season", is said to have a "Vaseline filter" because "it was virtually impossible to make out the queens through its cloudy haze", according to Screen Rant. The website has said, "The season 1 filter is probably the first thing that comes to mind when fans think back to the very first season of Drag Race. The competition show has since found its aesthetic in crisp and clear high-definition quality imaging and vibrant colors, but the original filter used for the series' opening season was a far cry from what viewers are used to now." During filming of the third season, there was a weeks-long production pause after a confrontation between contestants Mimi Imfurst and Shangela.

The thirteenth season (2021) was delayed and filmed during the COVID-19 pandemic. Drag Race "made history as one of the first shows to go into production during this period". According to Screen Rant, the production team "quite literally pioneered safe sets for COVID" and "managed to film an entire television season under the new protocols and kept everyone safe...What's more, they managed to do so while having a ton of fun. Season 13 is kinetic, drama-filled, and a blast for any fan of the show." Special guests like Anne Hathaway and Scarlett Johansson appeared on the show remotely. The special Corona Can't Keep a Good Queen Down showed the challenges faced by contestants and the production team while filming during the pandemic.

The Pit Crew is a group of male models who assist with challenges and other segments on the show. Members wear "modesty cups" in their underwear to hide the silhouettes of genitalia. Notable members have included Laith Ashley, Shawn Morales, and Simon Sherry-Wood.

==== Locations and set ====
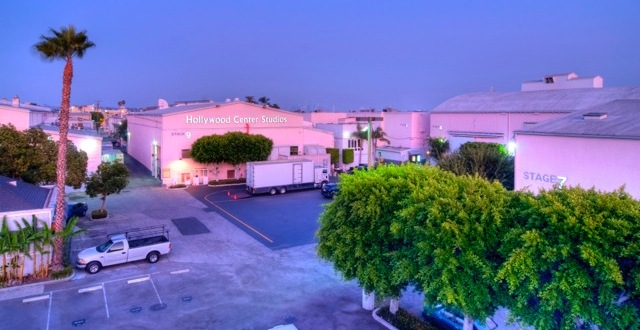
Sunset Las Palmas Studios in Hollywood, Los Angeles

RuPaul's Drag Race is mostly filmed at the Sunset Las Palmas Studios in Hollywood, Los Angeles. Some episodes, particularly season finales, have been filmed off-site. The finale of seasons 7 and 11 were filmed at Los Angeles's Orpheum Theatre. The finale of the tenth season (2018) was filmed at The Theatre at Ace Hotel in Los Angeles. The finale of the twelfth season (2020) was filmed virtually because of the pandemic. The finale of seasons 13 and 15 were filmed at the Ace Hotel and the finale of the fourteenth season (2022) was filmed at the Flamingo Las Vegas, which hosts the residency RuPaul's Drag Race Live! There have also been instances in which challenges have been filmed outside the studio. On the second season (2010), contestants went to Hollywood to perform burlesque for a crowd. On the fourth season, contestants went to Hollywood to collect materials from waste containers. Screen Rant said these off-site challenges "forced the contestants operate in a public environment, which challenged them in unique ways that are lacking from the show nowadays".

The workroom used by contestants is referred to as the "Werk Room". Lip-syncs are performed on a main stage, which has also been upgraded over time. There is also a separate room with a green screen, which is used by individual contestants during confessionals. The set has non-functioning clocks, but contestants are given time checks from production staff. The set also has an Untucked Lounge for tapings of RuPaul's Drag Race: Untucked. Previously, the set had an Absolut Vodka-sponsored Interior Illusions Lounge.

===== Werk Room =====
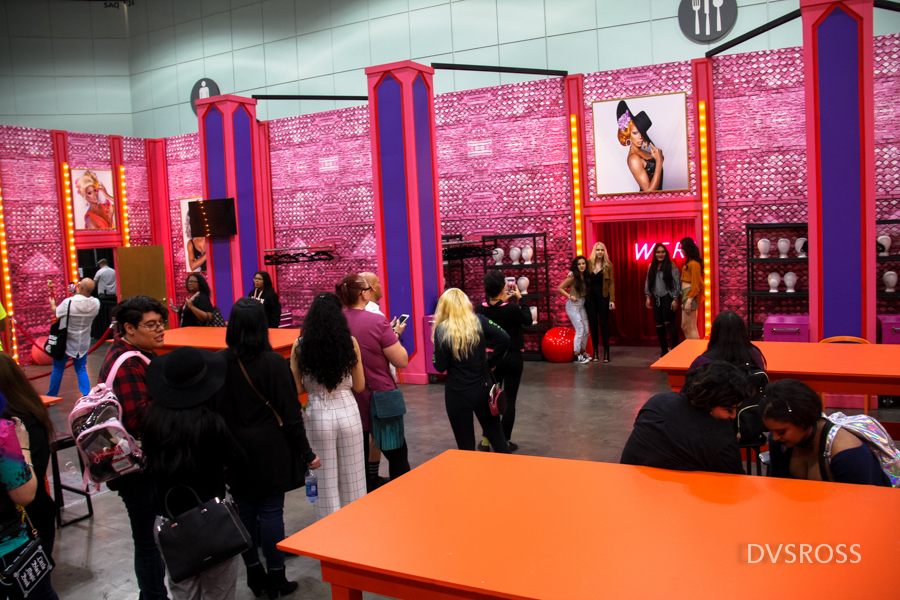
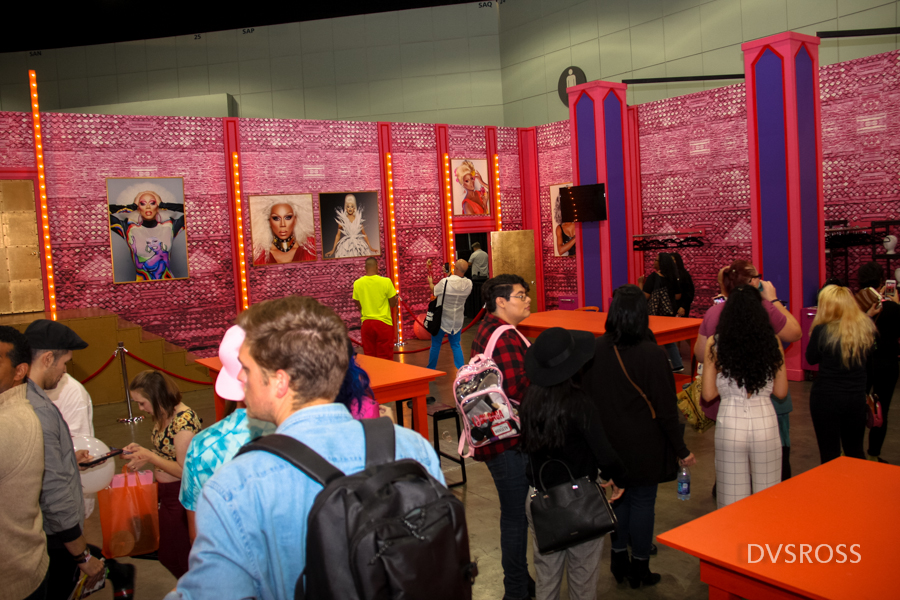
Reconstruction of the Werk Room at RuPaul's DragCon LA in 2018

According to Screen Rant, "The Werk Room is where queens, often nervously, prepare for their maxi challenges and converse with their fellow queens. It is also where surviving queens return after the maxi challenge on the runway, where there is typically a winning queen and an eliminated queen." The website said in 2021, "At first, the Werk Room was more of a workroom, a drab, mostly gray space that didn't stand out. For a while during the middle chunk of seasons, the Werk Room was covered in brick wallpaper and had pops of pink throughout. These days, the Werk Room is full of much more glitz and glamour. The colors are brighter and bolder, and the room is more pink than ever before."

The room has mirrors allowing contestants to prepare for main challenges and get into drag. Behind the mirrors is a hallway used by production staff, in order to capture more angles of the contestants. The Werk Room was upgraded ahead of the tenth season. It has been recreated at RuPaul's DragCon LA.

===== Untucked Lounge =====
The Untucked Lounge has props from the show's past, including a Lil' Poundcake doll created by Alaska Thunderfuck and Lineysha Sparx, the Ornacia head worn by Vivacious, and a large "shade" button. Two large cockroaches appear on the lounge's walls, a nod to a pink dress worn by Alaska on the second season of RuPaul's Drag Race All Stars which also inspired an outfit worn by Silky Nutmeg Ganache at finale event for the eleventh season. The lounge also has couches and a mannequin wearing a T-shirt with the words "charisma, uniqueness, nerve, and talent", which is a phrase used by RuPaul on the show. The lounge also has a large trophy at one of the cosmetics stations as a reference to a trophy presented to Anetra during a mini-challenge on the fifteenth season and a stack of RuPaul's hip pad boxes.

=== Choreography ===
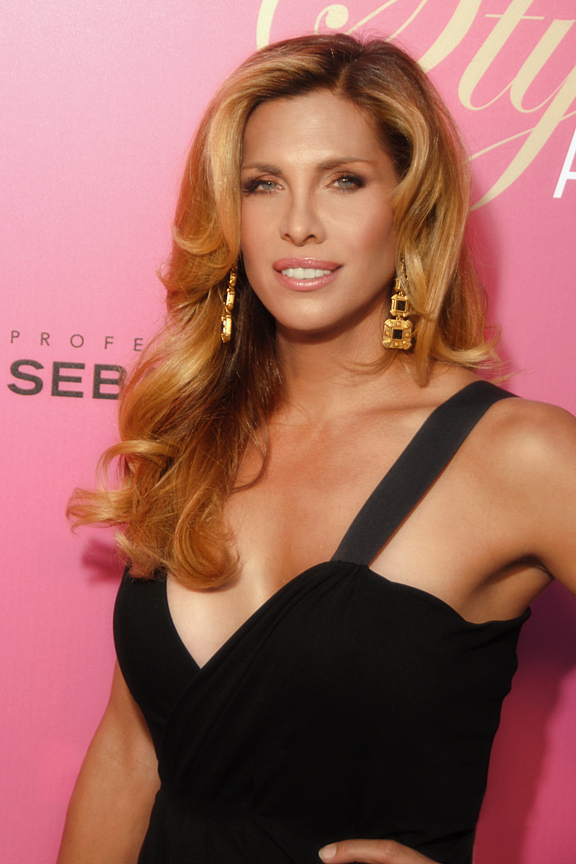
Candis Cayne

Screen Rant said in 2020, "Whether it is a on lip sync, a Rusical, or a straight-up choreography challenge, contestants are always asked to put their rhythm to test on the show. Thankfully, Drag Race has prominently featured various drag performers who also happen to be fantastic dancers."

Notable choreographers have included Candis Cayne and Jamal Sims. Miguel Zarate has also been a choreographer on the show. According to Deadline Hollywood, "For the dance numbers, Zarate is given a script before each Queen has a role, so he has to create a base for the choreography before they step on stage. As they start to learn the basic movements, Zarate can then tailor the individual performance a bit to make each Queen stand out."

=== Cosmetics and hair styling ===
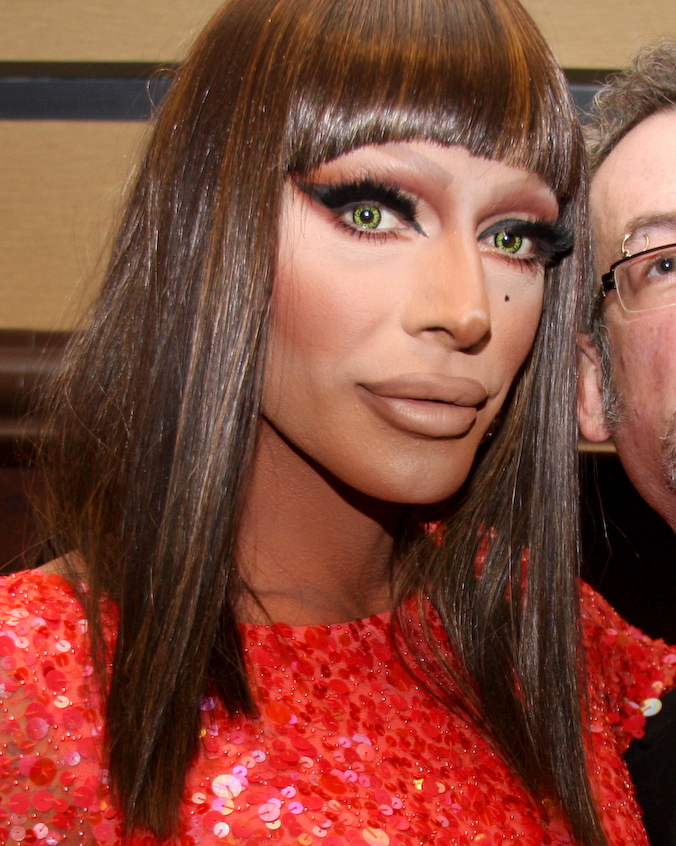
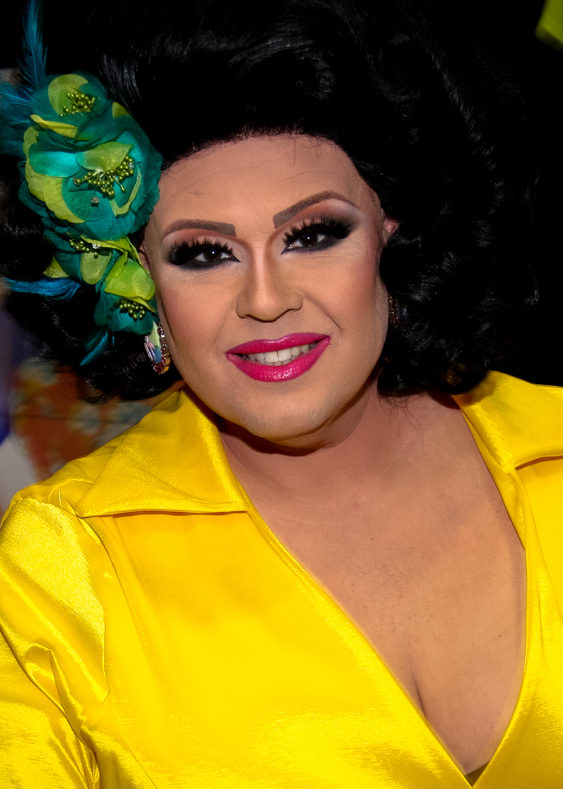
Former contestants Raven (left, pictured in 2014) and Delta Work (right, pictured in 2017) earned Primetime Emmy Awards for their work as make-up artist and hair stylist, respectively.

Australian artist Mathu Andersen was RuPaul's make-up artist until the ninth season. He was nominated for an Emmy Award in the same category for his work on the seventh season episode "ShakesQueer." Former contestant Raven became RuPaul's make-up artist in the ninth season.

Former contestant Delta Work styled RuPaul's wigs for seasons nine, ten, and eleven.

=== Costuming and fashion ===
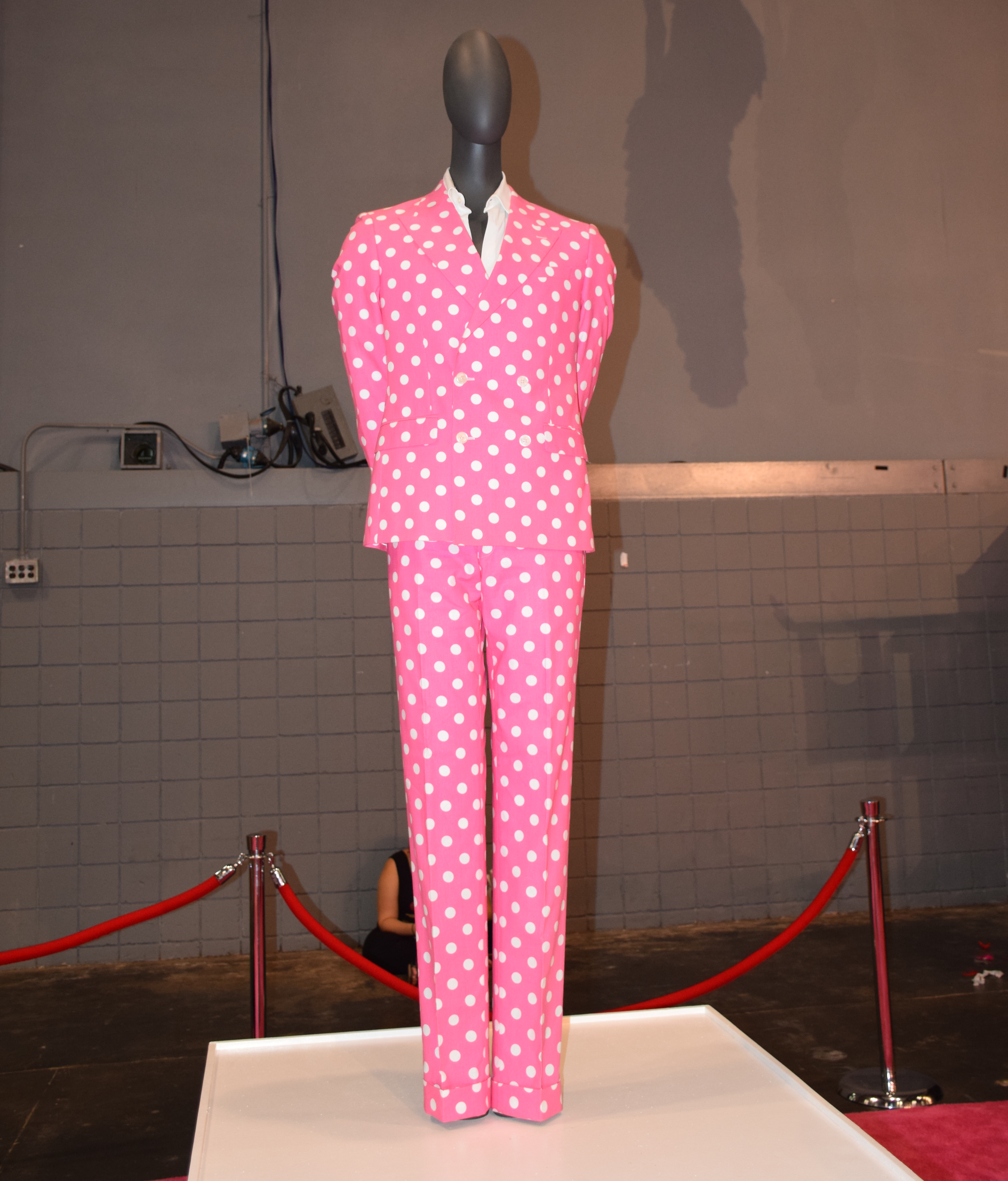
Suit worn by RuPaul on the show, displayed at RuPaul's DragCon NYC

Fashion-related expectations by judges and viewers have increased over time; according to Paper magazine, "The shift occurred around season seven, when Drag Race viewership surged and social media took hold: prior to then, appearing on Drag Race did not have the career jolt that it packs today." Screen Rant said in 2022, "Fashion is one of the key pillars when it comes to winning RuPaul's Drag Race. Through the years, the show has had queens who not only know how to turn a look but eat, sleep and breathe fashion." Vogue said in 2023, "Over the years, the various runway challenges have made the competing queens have to exercise creativity and style in the most unlikely of scenarios." RuPaul's outfits are often inspired by the episode's main challenge or popular culture.

American fashion designer Zaldy works with RuPaul on the show. According to Variety, Zaldy's "trust with RuPaul runs so deep, they don't even discuss finale looks prior to fittings". The two have worked together for decades. Zaldy is responsible for creating approximately 80 looks for RuPaul annually.

=== Music ===
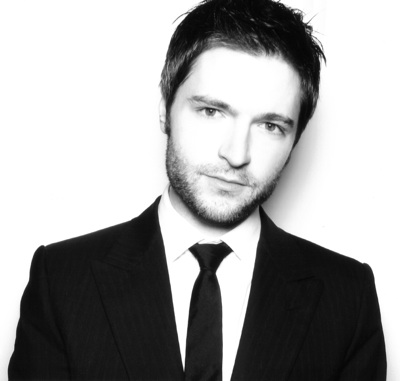
Lucian Piane

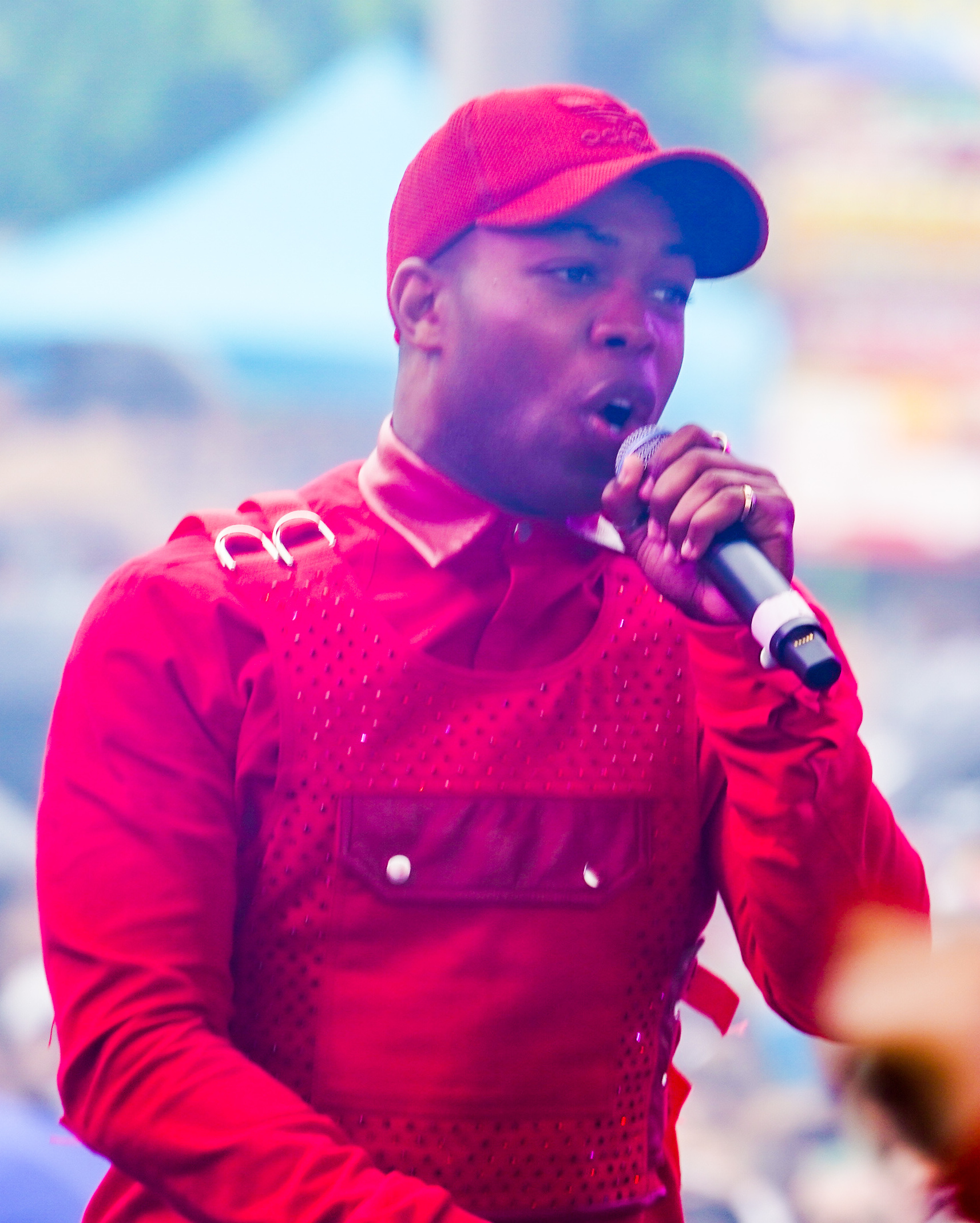
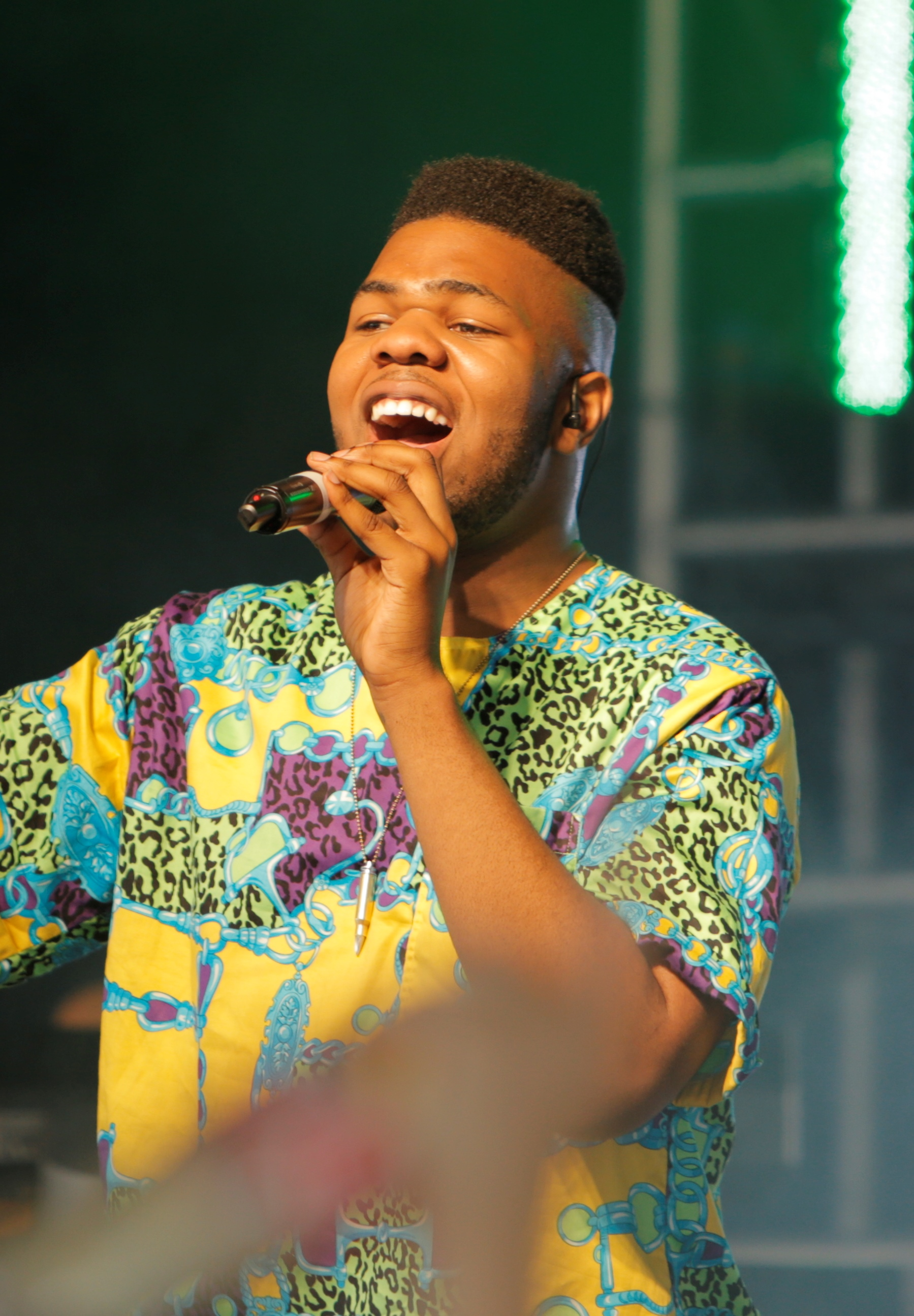
Todrick Hall (left, pictured in 2019) and MNEK (right, pictured in 2014)

In 2018, Billboard said the show has "spent plenty of time ... highlighting musical talent, be it from the queens, the panel of celebrity guest judges or RuPaul himself. Especially in its most recent seasons, the show has made constant references to world-famous musicians, while also affording the queens on the show their own opportunities to let their music shine." Original songs have been created for Rusicals, finale episodes, and other formats on the show.

RuPaul's music is featured prominently in the series. According to The Guardian, "RuPaul saw a way around mainstream radio by integrating his music catalogue – and his own personal history – into the show. RuPaul's original music and longevity in the public eye is a cornerstone of Drag Race. If you watch regularly, you hear RuPaul's songs, challenge by challenge, for the duration of the season. In a savvy twist on the sneak preview concept, a special album was made available on iTunes of the sixth season contestants covering RuPaul's songs." Contestants also regularly record original verses and perform to remixes of RuPaul songs.

Leland has written some of the show's Rusicals and has been described as the "resident composer" and songwriter. Freddy Scott has also been one of the songwriters. Previously, Lucian Piane was a composer for the show. Todrick Hall, MNEK, and AB Soto have made musical contributions.

==== Lip-sync contests ====
The music magazine Pitchfork has said, "One aspect at stake is the show's iconic lip sync battles, which decide who goes home and in the process have helped to establish a queer musical canon."

Contestants are given an iPod at the start of filming with songs slated to be used for lip-sync contests. RuPaul is involved in selecting which songs are used for lip-syncs. According to Screen Rant:

When Drag Race first began to air in 2009, it was hard for producers to obtain the rights to the songs that they wanted to use. [The show] was just getting its start, so nobody really knew much about the series at that time. Now that the VH1 show has become popular, that process has become a lot easier. The series now has artists approaching producers, hoping to get their songs on the show.

Songs used for lip-syncs see increased traffic on music streaming services as episodes air.

=== Sound ===
Entertainment Weekly described the show's sound effects as "legendarily shady".

== Reception ==
=== Critical response ===
Critical response of RuPaul's Drag Race
Season	Rotten Tomatoes
1	78% (9 reviews)
4	67% (6 reviews)
5	80% (5 reviews)
7	60% (5 reviews)
8	100% (6 reviews)
9	100% (11 reviews)
10	82% (11 reviews)
11	89% (9 reviews)
12	100% (8 reviews)

Thrillist called Drag Race "the closest gay culture gets to a sports league". In 2019, The Guardian ranked it 93rd on its list of the 100 best TV shows of the 21st century.

Shannon Keating for BuzzFeed News wrote about the show's "subversive, irreverent beginnings" briefly turning "comfortably mainstream... humdrum and derivative" prior to season 13's release. She recalls that a flurry of political disputes, as well as "overexposure", threatened to ruin Drag Race's legacy before the refreshed 2021 season.

Coleman Splide for The Daily Beast wrote in 2021 that "RuPaul has continually allowed the legacy of his subversive landmark reality show to be slowly chipped away at". Though Splide states that the show is "a critical part of bringing empowering inclusivity to the forefront of mainstream culture", he maintains that it also invites indignation from an ever-expanding and oftentimes toxic fanbase, as well as contributing to the increasingly capitalised nature of pride celebrations around the globe.

=== Accolades ===
RuPaul's Drag Race has been nominated for thirty-nine Emmy Awards, and won twenty-four. It has also been nominated for nine Reality Television Awards, winning three, and nominated for six NewNowNext Awards, winning three.

Series host RuPaul has won multiple Primetime Emmy Awards for Outstanding Host for a Reality or Reality Competition Program, including in 2016, 2017, 2018, 2019, 2020, 2021, 2022, and 2023; RuPaul was nominated in the same category in 2024. His eight consecutive wins in the category make him the host with the most wins since the inception of the award in 2008, as well as the first and only African-American host to receive the award to date.

RuPaul also holds a Guinness World Records title for the most Emmy wins for Outstanding Host for a Reality or Competition Program, featured in the 2021 edition.

Numerous members of the production crew have won or been nominated for Creative Arts Emmy Awards and other awards.

== Controversy ==
In March 2014, Drag Race sparked controversy over the use of the term "shemale" (a play on "Tyra-Mail" on America's Next Top Model) in the season 6 mini challenge "Female or She-male?". Logo has since removed the segment from all platforms and addressed the allegations of transphobia by removing the "You've got she-mail" intro from new episodes of the series. RuPaul did not prefer to discontinue use of the catch phrase. This was replaced with "She done already done had herses!" RuPaul also came under fire for comments made in an interview with The Guardian, in which he stated he would "probably not" allow a transgender contestant to compete. He compared transgender drag performers to doping athletes on his Twitter, and has since apologized. Sasha Velour (season 9) disagreed, tweeting "My drag was born in a community full of trans women, trans men, and gender non-conforming folks doing drag. That's the real world of drag, like it or not. I thinks it's fabulous and I will fight my entire life to protect and uplift it".

In March 2026, during Season 18, the show faced scrutiny after featuring the story and photographs of Barry Winchell, a soldier murdered in a 1999 hate crime. Transgender activist Calpernia Addams, Winchell's partner at the time, stated she was "shocked" and "gobsmacked" that the production used their images and history during a makeover challenge without contacting her beforehand.

== Relationship with the transgender community ==
For the first twelve seasons, RuPaul would say, "Gentlemen, start your engines, and may the best woman win," before the contestants' runway looks for the episode were shown. In the thirteenth season, it was changed to: "Racers, start your engines, and may the best drag queen win." In season 6 of All Stars, an altered version of the show's opening theme was introduced with the new tag line.

Performers of any sexual orientation and gender identity are eligible to audition, although most contestants to date have been gay, cisgender men. Transgender competitors have become more common as seasons have progressed; Sonique, a season 2 contestant, became the first openly trans contestant when she came out as a woman during the reunion special. Sonique later won All Stars 6, becoming the first trans woman to win an English-language version of the show and the second overall. Monica Beverly Hillz (season 5) became the first contestant to come out as a trans woman during the competition. Peppermint (season 9) is the first contestant who was out as a trans woman prior to the airing of her season. Other trans contestants came out as women after their elimination, including Carmen Carrera, Kenya Michaels, Stacy Layne Matthews, Jiggly Caliente, Gia Gunn, Laganja Estranja, Gigi Goode, and Adore Delano. Additionally, Gottmik (season 13) was the first AFAB and openly transgender male contestant in the franchise's history. Various contestants have come out as non-binary as well, such as Jinkx Monsoon.

Season 14 is the first regular season to feature five transgender women in the cast—Kerri Colby, Kornbread "The Snack" Jeté, Bosco, Jasmine Kennedie, and Willow Pill. While Kerri Colby and Kornbread entered the show openly trans, Jasmine Kennedie came out in episode 7 of Untucked and Bosco and Willow came out after the show's taping.

== Broadcast and streaming ==
- Australia: In Australia, lifestyle channel LifeStyle YOU regularly showed and re-screened seasons 1–7, including Untucked. In addition, free-to-air channel SBS2 began screening the first season on August 31, 2013. On March 13, 2017, it was announced that on-demand service Stan would fast-track season 9 (including Untucked). As of 2020, Stan streams all seasons since season 1, as well as Untucked, All Stars, All Stars Untucked, Canada's Drag Race, Secret Celebrity, Drag Race UK and season 2 of Drag Race Thailand.
- Canada: The series airs on OutTV in Canada at the same time as the US airing. Unlike Logo, OutTV continues to broadcast Untucked immediately after each Drag Race episode. Beginning with season 12, OutTV has shared its first-run rights to the main series (but not Untucked) with the more widely subscribed Crave streaming service, with episodes available on Crave shortly after they premiere on OutTV, in connection with Crave and OutTV's co-production of Canada's Drag Race. Past seasons are also available on Netflix in Canada, with each season released there shortly before the next season begins.
- Ireland: In Ireland, seasons 2-8 of the program were available on Netflix; as of the release of season 10, only seasons 8-9 are available. Netflix has started airing season 10 episodes one day after they air in the US. All seasons of the show have been made available on Netflix since October 2018.
- Indonesia: In Indonesia, seasons 1-13 of the program were available on Netflix, alongside the Christmas spectacular. As of the release of All Stars, only seasons 4-5 are available. Netflix also aired Untucked season 10 episodes one day after they aired in the US.
- UK: E4 aired season 1 in 2009, followed by season 2 in 2010. Since its success on Netflix in the UK, TruTV acquired the broadcast rights for all eight seasons of the show including Untucked episodes. In June 2015, TruTV started airing two episodes of the show a week, starting with season 4, followed by All Stars, then season 5. As of May 2018, the series airs on VH1 UK Monday–Thursday at 11 p.m., beginning with All Stars season 3.
- Israel: Yes has broadcast all seasons and Untucked episodes. Seasons 1–12, All Stars seasons 4–5 and Untucked seasons 11–12 are also available on Netflix.

Full seasons of shows in the Drag Race franchise are available to stream on WOW Presents Plus in over 200 territories. The show is also currently available on the following streaming platforms:

- United States — Hulu (seasons 2–9; All Stars 1–4); Paramount Plus (seasons 1–14, All Stars 1–8, Untucked seasons 9–13, All Stars Untucked seasons 2–5), WOW Presents Plus (Untucked seasons 7–9, Thailand season 2, and all other international series)
- Canada — Netflix (seasons 1–12, All Stars 4, Untucked seasons 11 and 12), Crave (all seasons, All Stars 1–6, UK series 1–3, Canada season 1 and 2, Down Under season 1), WOW Presents Plus (seasons 1–10, Untucked seasons 1–10, All Stars 1–4)
- UK & Ireland — Netflix (seasons 11–13, Untucked seasons 11–13, All Stars 4–6, Celebrity season 1), BBC iPlayer (UK series 1, 2 and 3, Canada season 1 and 2, Down Under season 1), WOW Presents Plus (seasons 1–10, Untucked seasons 1–10, all episodes of All Stars and Holland)
- Australia — Stan (all seasons of original, All Stars, Untucked, UK, Canada, Down Under and Thailand season 2), WOW Presents Plus (UK series 1, Canada season 1)

== Spin-offs ==
=== Specials ===
- RuPaul's Drag Race: Green Screen Christmas (2015): On December 13, 2015, Logo aired a seasonal themed episode. The non-competitive special was released in conjunction with RuPaul's holiday album Slay Belles and featured music videos for songs from the album. The cast included RuPaul, Michelle Visage, Siedah Garrett, and Todrick Hall, and former contestants Alyssa Edwards, Laganja Estranja, Latrice Royale, Raja, and Shangela.
- RuPaul's Drag Race Holi-slay Spectacular (2018): On November 1, 2018, VH1 announced a seasonal themed special episode scheduled to air on December 7, 2018. Eight former contestants competed for the title of "America's first Drag Race Christmas Queen". Competitors included Eureka O'Hara, Jasmine Masters, Kim Chi, Latrice Royale, Mayhem Miller, Shangela, Sonique, and Trixie Mattel.
- RuPaul's Drag Race: Corona Can't Keep a Good Queen Down (2021): On February 26, 2021, the one hour special aired on VH1 in between episodes 8 and 9 of Season 13 and detailed the contestants' journeys with filming the season amid the ongoing COVID-19 pandemic.

=== Television series ===
- RuPaul's Drag U (2010–2012): In each episode, three women are paired with former Drag Race contestants ("Drag Professors"), who give them drag makeovers and help them to access their "inner divas".
- RuPaul's Drag Race All Stars (2012–present): Past contestants return and compete for a spot in the Drag Race Hall of Fame. The show's format is similar to that of RuPaul's Drag Race, with challenges and a panel of judges.
- Dancing Queen (2018): In April 2013, RuPaul confirmed that he planned to executive-produce a spin-off of Drag Race that stars season 5 and All Stars season 2 contestant Alyssa Edwards, who shared its original title is Beyond Belief and that his dance company in Mesquite, Texas is the setting. The series aired on Netflix on October 5, 2018.
- RuPaul's Secret Celebrity Drag Race (2020–present): On April 10, 2020, VH1 announced a celebrity edition of Drag Race scheduled to air for four weeks beginning on April 24, 2020. The series featured a trio of celebrities receiving makeovers from former contestants. After receiving help from "Queen Supremes" Alyssa Edwards, Asia O'Hara, Bob the Drag Queen, Kim Chi, Monét X Change, Monique Heart, Nina West, Trinity the Tuck, Trixie Mattel and Vanessa Vanjie Mateo, the celebrities competed in fan-favorite challenges and on the runway to be named "America's Next Celebrity Drag Race Superstar" and prize money for choice charities.
- RuPaul's Drag Race: Vegas Revue (2020): On July 22, 2020, it was announced that a docu-series would premiere on August 21, 2020.

=== International adaptations ===
Drag Race has been franchised into numerous international adaptations.

- (Australia) (New Zealand) Drag Race Down Under (formerly RuPaul's Drag Race Down Under)
- (Belgium) Drag Race Belgique
- (Brazil) Drag Race Brasil
- Canada's Drag Race
- (Chile) The Switch Drag Race
- Drag Race France
- Drag Race Germany
- (Italy) Drag Race Italia
- (Mexico) Drag Race México
- (Netherlands) Drag Race Holland
- Drag Race Philippines
- Drag Race South Africa
- (Spain) Drag Race España
- (Sweden) Drag Race Sverige
- Drag Race Thailand
- (United Kingdom) RuPaul's Drag Race UK

As well as the following spin-off competitions:

- RuPaul's Drag Race Global All Stars
- (Australia) (New Zealand) Drag Race Down Under vs. the World
- Canada's Drag Race All Stars
- Canada's Drag Race: Canada vs. the World
- Drag Race France All Stars
- Drag Race Mexico: Latina Royale
- Drag Race Philippines: Slaysian Royale
- (Spain) Drag Race España All Stars
- (United Kingdom) RuPaul's Drag Race: UK vs. the World

=== Other media ===
- RuPaul's Drag Race Superstar is a mobile app by World of Wonder and Leaf Mobile's subsidiary East Side Games, which was released on October 25, 2021.

== Home media ==
DVD releases of the seasons include bonus scenes and other special features

Season	Release date	Special features	Discs
2	December 6, 2011	Interviews with contestants; Extended reunion moments	3
3	December 6, 2011	Interviews with contestants; Extended reunion moments	4
4	June 26, 2012	Episodes of Untucked; Episodes of Drag Ya Later with Jon & John	5
5	June 10, 2013	Episodes of Untucked	5
6	October 21, 2014	Episodes of Untucked	5
7	June 8, 2016	RuPaul's Drag Race: The Ru-les; Episodes of Whatcha Packin'	4
8	July 29, 2016	Episodes of Whatcha Packin'	3

== Discography ==
Soundtrack albums
Title	Album Details
RuPaul's Drag Race: The Rusical	Released: April 22, 2016; Label: World of Wonder Records; Formats: Digital download, streaming

Compilation albums
Title	Album Details
RuPaul Presents: The CoverGurlz	Released: January 28, 2014; Label: World of Wonder Records; Formats: Digital download, streaming
RuPaul Presents: CoverGurlz 2	Released: February 23, 2016; Label: World of Wonder Records; Formats: Digital download, streaming

Extended plays
Title	Album Details
RuPaul's Drag Race Live: The Official Vegas Soundtrack	Released: January 27, 2020; Label: World of Wonder Records; Formats: Digital download, streaming
Moulin Ru: The Rusical	Released: March 26, 2022; Label: World of Wonder Records; Formats: Digital download, streaming
Wigloose: The Rusical!	Released: March 18, 2023; Label: World of Wonder Records; Formats: Digital download, streaming
The Sound of Rusic	Released: February 17, 2024; Label: World of Wonder Records; Formats: Digital download, streaming
Bitch I'm a Drag Queen, Vol. 1	Released: January 24, 2025; Label: World of Wonder Records; Formats: Digital download, streaming
Bitch I'm a Drag Queen, Vol. 2	Released: January 24, 2025; Label: World of Wonder Records; Formats: Digital download, streaming
The Wicked Wiz of Oz: The Rusical	Released: February 22, 2025; Label: World of Wonder Records; Formats: Digital download, streaming
Fannie: The Hard Knock Ball – The Rusical	Released: February 28, 2026; Label: World of Wonder Records; Formats: Digital download, streaming

Singles, with select chart positions
Title	Season	Peak chart positions
Title	Season	US Dance Dig.
"Cover Girl" (featuring BeBe Zahara Benet)	1	—
"Can I Get An Amen"	5	—
"Oh No She Better Don't" (with ShyBoy)	6	—
"Legs"	8	—
"I Don't Like to Show Off"	8	—
"Fat, Fem, and Asian"	8	—
"Category Is" (Cast Version)	9	—
"PharmaRusical"	10	—
"Cher: The Unauthorized Rusical"	10	—
"American" (Cast Version)	10	12
"Trump: The Rusical" (featuring April Malina, Melodye Perry, Brooke Wilkes, Devon Weigel and Anna Graves)	11	—
"Queens Everywhere" (Cast Version)	11	20
"I'm That Bitch"	12	—
"You Don't Know Me"	12	—
"Madonna: The Unauthorized Rusical"	12	—
"I Made It / Mirror Song / Losing is the New Winning (Las Vegas Live Medley)"	12	—
"The Shady Bunch"	12	—
"ConDragulations" (Cast Version)	13	—
"Phenomenon" (Cast Version)	13	—
"Social Media: The Unverified Rusical"	13	—
"Lucky"	13	—
"Save a Queen"	14	—
"My Baby Is Love: The RuPremes"	14	—
"He's My Baby: The RuNettes"	14	—
"Bad Boy Baby: The ShangRu-Las"	14	—
"Catwalk" (Cast Version)	14	—
"I Hate People" (Willow Pill)	14	—
"I Fell Down (I Got Up)" (Lady Camden)	14	—
"Fighter" (Daya Betty)	14	—
"Devil" (Bosco)	14	—
"Check My Track Record" (Angeria Paris VanMicheals)	14	—
"Golden Girlfriends – Banjo Bitches"	15	—
"Golden Years – Rockin' Old Gs"	15	—
"Golden Hips – Ol' Dirty Bitches"	15	—
"Blame It on the Edit" (Cast Version)	15	—
"Lotus" (Anetra)	15	—
"It's Giving Fashion" (Luxx Noir London)	15	—
"Delusion" (Mistress Isabelle Brooks)	15	—
"Goddess" (Sasha Colby)	15	—
"Power"	16	—
"Queen of Wind" (Nymphia Wind)	16	—
"Bodysuit" (Plane Jane)	16	—
"Dance!" (Sapphira Cristál)	16	—
"Ding" (ft. Jewels Sparkles)	17	—
"Classic" (ft. Lexi Love)	17	—
"It Do Take Nurve" (ft. Onya Nurve)	17	—
"Star" (ft. Sam Star)	17	—
"Glam!" (Go-Go-Go!)	18	—
"Funk Almighty!" (Studio 50-Whores)	18	—
"Cherries" (The Tucked Aways)	18	—
"Versatile" (ft. Myki Meeks)	18	—
"Stimulate" (ft. Nini Coco)	18	—
"Cookin' with Gas" (ft. Darlene Mitchell)	18	—
"—" denotes a recording that failed to chart, was ineligible for the chart or was not released.

== See also ==
- List of reality television programs with LGBT cast members
- List of Rusicals
- LGBT culture in New York City
- Paris Is Burning (film)
