= I Hate People =

Single by the cast of RuPaul's Drag Race season 14
- Released: April 23, 2022
- Length: 1:11
- Label: World of Wonder
- Songwriters: Willow Pill; Brett McLaughlin; Gabe Lopez
- Producers: Leland; Lopez

Performance video
- "I Hate People" on YouTube

"I Hate People" is a song recorded for the fourteenth season of American reality competition series RuPaul's Drag Race, used on the episode "Grand Finale" for a lip sync performance by the American drag performer Willow Pill. The song features elements of house music and latin jazz, and written by Willow Pill, alongside its producers Leland and Gabe Lopez. The American singer-songwriter Sarah Hudson provided vocals for the song.

Inspired by Deee-Lite's "Groove Is in the Heart" (1990) and moments from Willow Pill's run on Drag Race, the song was released on April 23, 2022, by World of Wonder Productions, a day after the premiere of the final episode of the show's fourteenth season. An extended version of "I Hate People", subtitled as the "XL" version, was released on June 22, 2022, as part of a For Your Consideration campaign for the 74th Primetime Emmy Awards.

== Background and release ==
The renewal of RuPaul's Drag Race for a fourteenth season was announced by VH1 on August 23, 2021. Its cast was unveiled on December 2, 2021, where Willow Pill's participation was announced, as well as its premiere date of January 7, 2022. The season's finalists, including Willow Pill, were revealed during its fourteenth episode, "Catwalk". "I Hate People" was premiered during the "Grand Finale" episoode, alongside Daya Betty's "Fighter", Angeria Paris VanMichaels' "Check My Track Record", Lady Camden's "I Fell Down (I Got Back Up)" and Bosco's "Devil". Willow Pill was declared the winner of the season on the same episode. The song was released the following day by World of Wonder Productions.

== Composition ==
"I Hate People" was written by Willow Pill, Leland and Gabe Lopez, while the latter two took part in the song's production. Sarah Hudson provides lead vocals throughout the track. It is one minute and eleven seconds long. Willow Pill referenced Deee-Lite's "Groove Is in the Heart" (1990) as inspiration for the song. The song utilizes elements from house music and latin jazz. When asked about the idea behind "I Hate People", Willow Pill said:

"I wanted to do something left-field. I didn't want it to be about me specifically, because drag can sometimes be a little over-branding of yourself. The other girls go right, I want to go left. I wanted a song that was true, and that is that I hate people. They really bother me. I wish it could just be me alone and my Beanie Babies."

— Willow Pill

The song's development began with each finalist from season fourteen sending Leland a list of catchphrases, notable moments and ideas for their original song. The lyric "I love a..." was initially written as a placeholder, with Willow Pill suggesting "toaster" and "bath" as references to moments from her Drag Race run. Willow Pill said the song was written in 10 days, from "idea to the end product".

== Promotion ==
=== Live performance ===
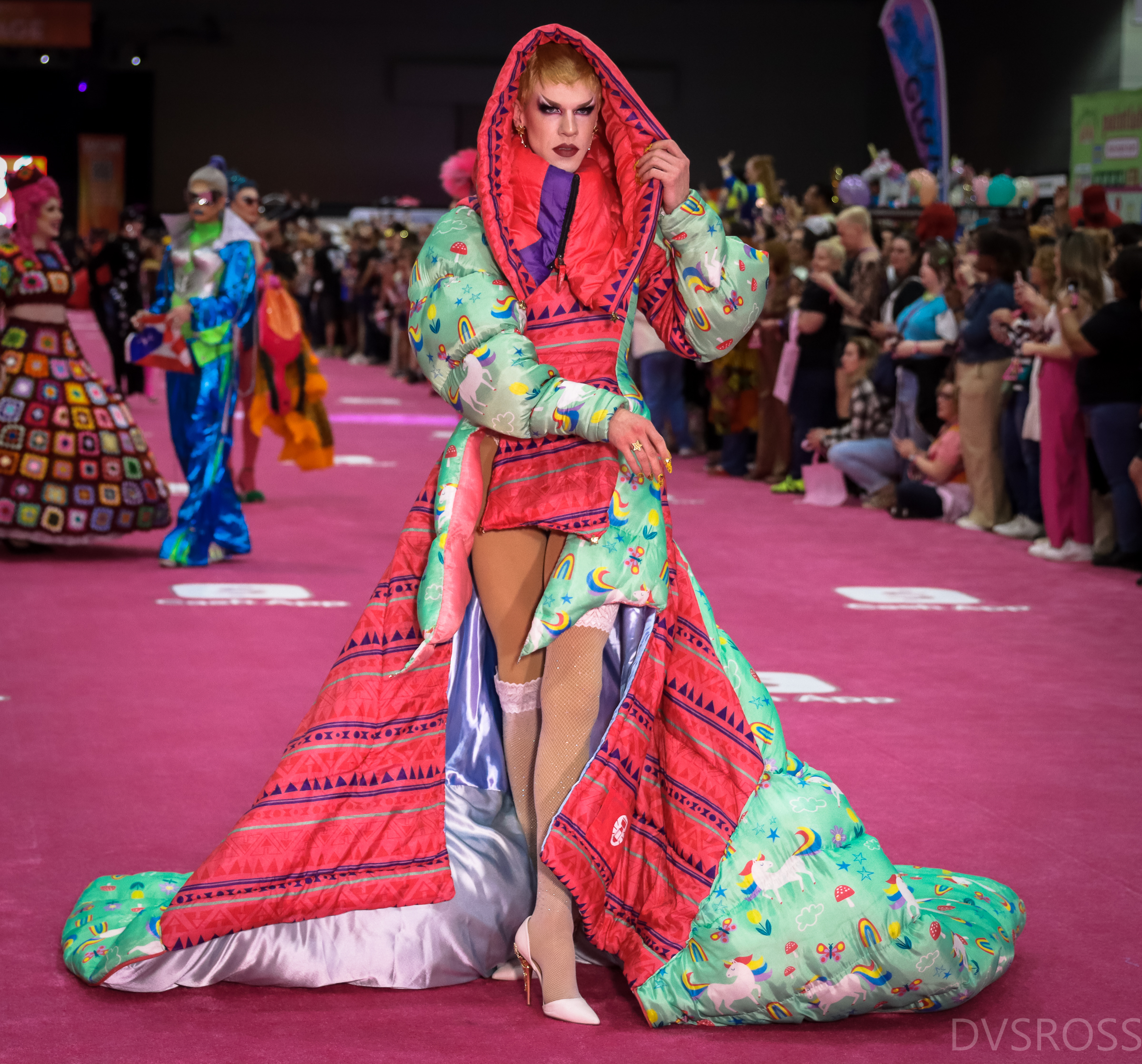
Utica Queen (pictured in 2023) made the outfit for Willow Pill's "I Hate People" performance.

During the RuPaul's Drag Race season fourteen finale episode, "Grand Finale", each finalist created a lip sync performance to their respective original song, including Willow Pill with "I Hate People". She wore three clones of her head, inspired by a three-headed hydra, including one positioned in her crotch area. Willow Pill explained that the look represented the "many sides" of herself, which she said extended beyond her sexuality to the different identities she had adopted to escape difficult experiences, adding that "those people still live inside", with each head representing one of those identities. The outfit was created by Utica Queen, who was a contestant on season thirteen of RuPaul's Drag Race.

=== "XL" version ===
An extended remix of "I Hate People", subtitled as the "XL" version, was released on June 22, 2022, by World of Wonder Productions. Its release was part of a For Your Consideration campaign by VH1 for the 74th Primetime Emmy Awards, where the original version of the song was submitted in the Outstanding Original Music and Lyrics category. It was the first time a Drag Race contestant was eligible for an Emmy Award for work from their original season.

== Critical reception ==
Bernardo Sim of Pride.com placed "I Hate People" in a listicle of the ten best original songs of RuPaul's Drag Race, describing it as a "hilarious" and "campy" song, adding that it helped solidify Willow Pill's trajectory to winning the show. Joey Nolfi of Entertainment Weekly has described the song as a "hilarious curmudgeon anthem". Writing for Xtra, Kevin O'Keeffe named the song the "best song of the set", calling it "boppy" and "funny", comparing it to "something Lily Allen might perform".

== Release history ==
Release dates and formats
Region	Date	Format	Version	Label	Ref.
Various	April 23, 2022	Music download; streaming	Original	World of Wonder	
Various	June 22, 2022	Music download; streaming	"XL"	World of Wonder	
