= Grand Finale (RuPaul's Drag Race season 14) =

- RuPaul's Drag Race episode
- Episode no.: Season 14; Episode 16
- Presented by: RuPaul
- Original air date: April 22, 2022

Episode chronology
- RuPaul's Drag Race (season 14)

"Grand Finale" is the sixteenth episode of the fourteenth season of the American television series RuPaul's Drag Race. It was filmed at Flamingo Las Vegas, in Las Vegas, Nevada, and originally aired on April 22, 2022. The episode sees the final five contestants perform to original songs. After a final lip-sync between Lady Camden and Willow Pill to "Gimme! Gimme! Gimme! (A Man After Midnight)" by Cher, Willow Pill is crowned the season's winner.

== Episode ==
External media
- Angeria Paris VanMicheals “Check My Track Record” Performance at RuPaul’s Drag Race Season 14 Finale on YouTube
- Bosco - “Devil” Performance at RuPaul’s Drag Race Season 14 Finale on YouTube
- Daya Betty - “Fighter” Performance at RuPaul’s Drag Race Season 14 Finale on YouTube
- Lady Camden - “I Fell Down (I Got Up)” Performance at RuPaul’s Drag Race Season 14 Finale on YouTube
- Willow Pill - “I Hate People” Performance at RuPaul’s Drag Race Season 14 Finale on YouTube

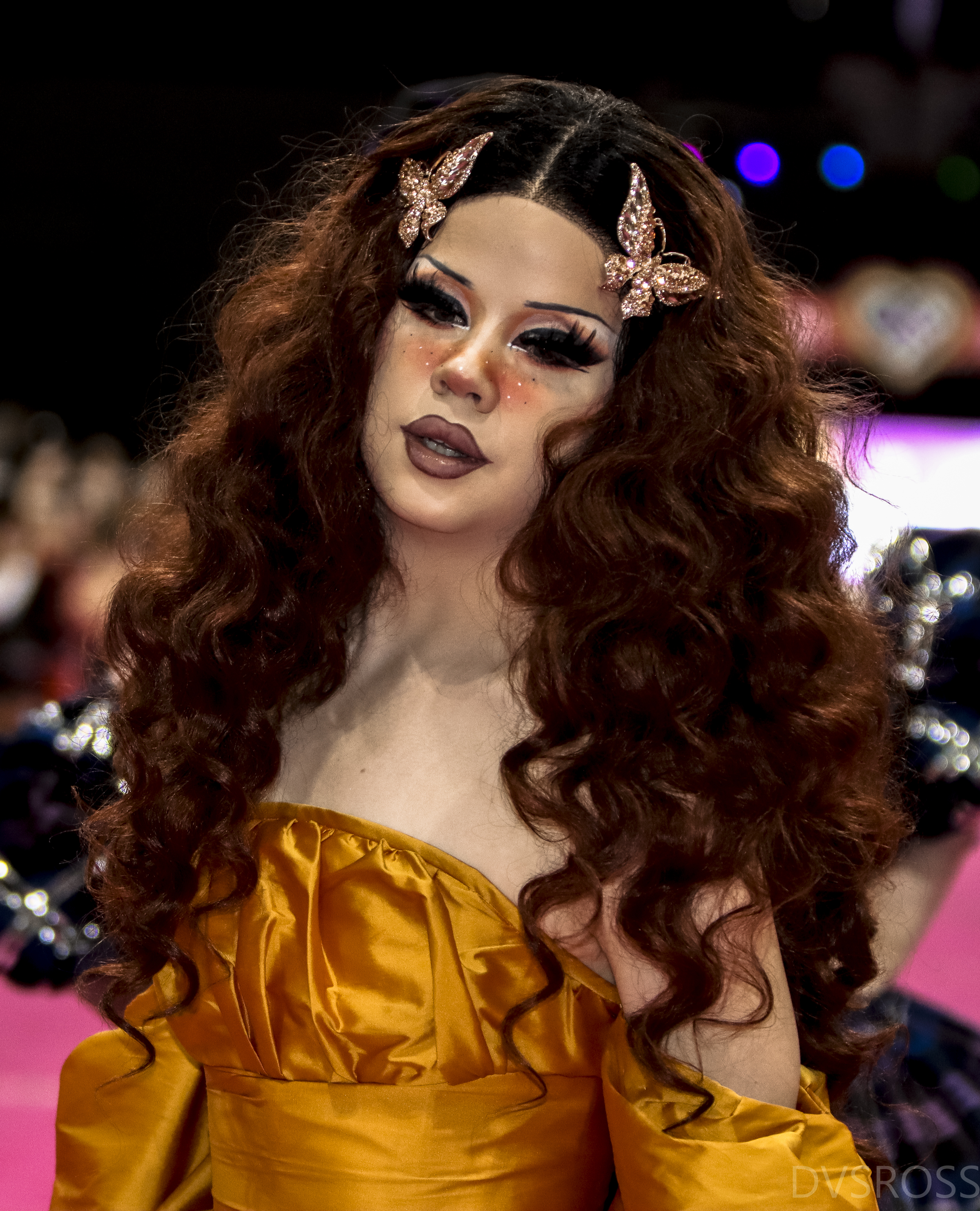
Willow Pill is crowned the season's winner.

All of the contestants return for the grand finale. RuPaul enters the stage, welcomes the audience, and explains how a winner will be crowned. Michelle Visage reveals that Clark County has declared April 22 as "RuPaul Day" on the Las Vegas Strip. Visage presents RuPaul with a key to the city.

The final five contestants each perform to a song that was written specifically for them. Angeria Paris VanMicheals lip-syncs to "Check My Track Record", Bosco lip-syncs to "Devil", Daya Betty lip-syncs to "Fighter", Lady Camden lip-syncs to "I Fell Down (I Got Up)", and Willow Pill lip-syncs to "I Hate People". Former contestants perform Jaida Essence Hall, Kameron Michaels, Trinity K. Bonet, Kahanna Montrese, Naomi Smalls, and Derrick Barry perform "Losing Is the New Winning" from the concert residency RuPaul's Drag Race Live!, which concludes with the season's eliminated contestants returning to the stage. The show pays tribute to the drag performer Hot Chocolate, who is in the audience.

RuPaul tells the contestants that only two will be advancing to the final lip-sync of the season. It is announced that the final two contestants are Lady Camden and Willow Pill, meaning Angeria Paris VanMicheals, Bosco, and Daya Betty are eliminated from the competition. Reigning winner Symone invites LaLa Ri to share that Kornbread "The Snack" Jeté is this season's Miss Congeniality. Lady Camden and Willow Pill face off in a lip-sync contest to "Gimme! Gimme! Gimme! (A Man After Midnight)" by Cher. It is announced that Willow Pill is the winner, making Lady Camden the runner-up.

== Production ==
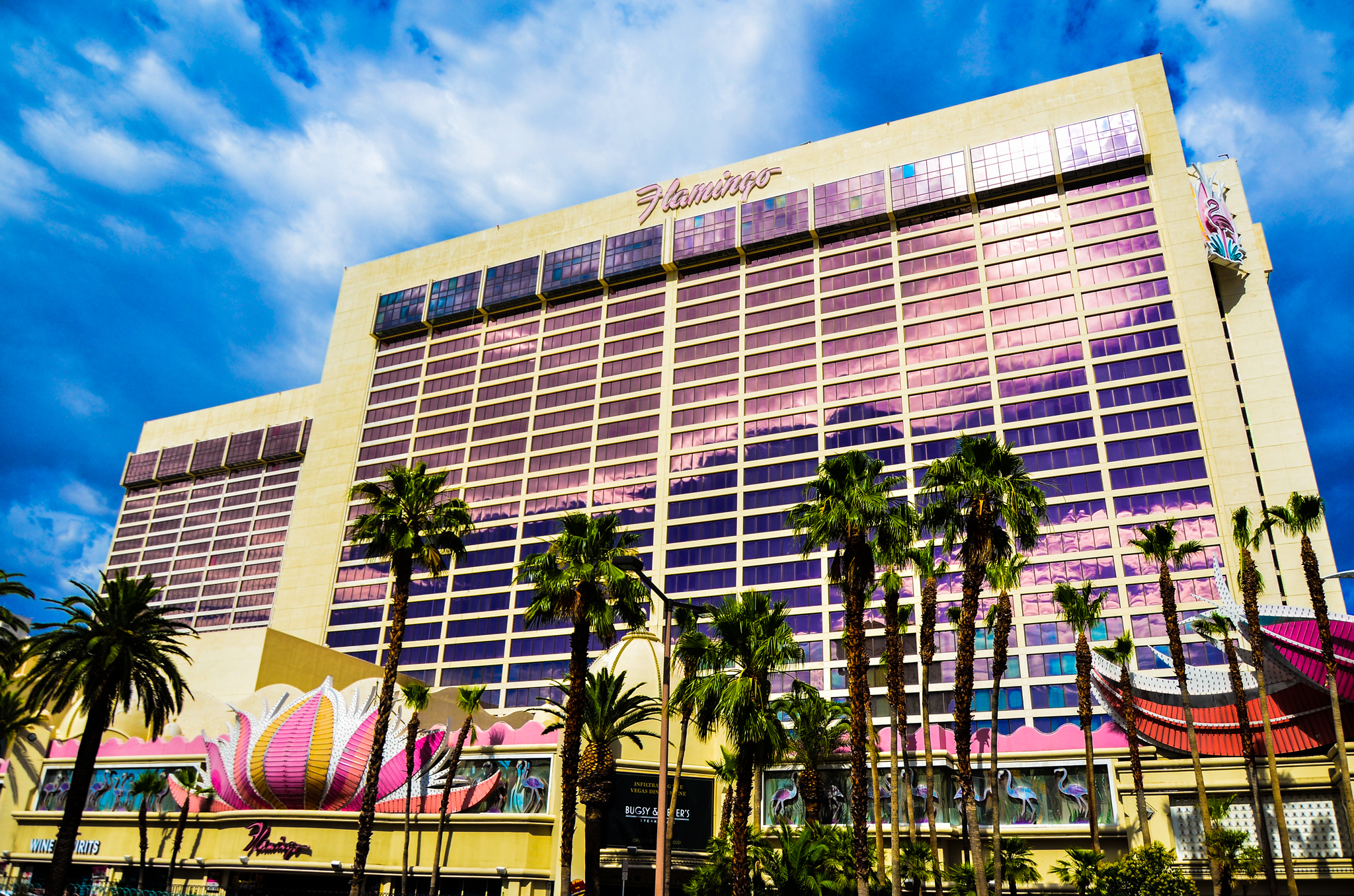
The episode was filmed at Flamingo Las Vegas (exterior pictured in 2020).

The episode originally aired on April 22, 2022. It was filed at Flamingo Las Vegas. The original songs were produced by Leland.

Joey Nolfi of Entertainment Weekly described "I Hate People" as a "hilarious curmudgeon anthem". The song was written by Willow Pill, Leland, and Gabe Lopez. VH1 submitted the song for consideration in the Outstanding Original Music and Lyrics category of the Primetime Emmy Awards. According to Bustle, this marked the first time a Drag Race contestant was eligible for an Emmy for work from their original season.

Willow Pill became the first transgender contestant to win a regular season of the show.

=== Fashion ===
Lady Camden wears a gold-and-pink outfit and a long braid. Tony Bravo of the San Francisco Chronicle described her outfit as "a witty callback to her Freddie Mercury moment, with an added touch of deconstruction". Bosco wears an angelic outfit that tore away to reveal a darker bodysuit. Her headpiece was created by Cameron Hughes. Daya Betty wears an insect-inspired outfit with 5-foot-long antenna. The outfit was painted and rhinestoned by Joshuan Aponte. Symone wears a "very stylized version of a streetwear look", according to Screen Rant.

== Reception ==
Trae DeLellis of The A.V. Club gave the episode a rating of 'B'. Paul McCallion of Vulture rated the episode four out of five stars. Bernardo Sim of Out called Willow Pill's "I Hate People" performance "relatable and hilarious". He also included the song in Pride.com's 2023 list of the show's ten best original song, in which he described "I Hate People" as "hilarious and campy". The song was described by Hugh McIntyre of Bustle as "catchy" and by the San Antonio Current as "bitchy". McKinley Franklin of The Hollywood Reporter said the song "spotlighted Willow's not-so-subtle sharp-witted nature that made viewers fall in love with her".
