= 60s Girl Groups =

2022 episode of RuPaul's Drag Race

- RuPaul's Drag Race episode
- Episode no.: Season 14; Episode 8

Guest appearance
- Alec Mapa

Episode chronology
| ← Previous "The Daytona Wind" | Next → "Menzeses" |

"60s Girl Groups" is the eighth episode of the fourteenth season of the American television series RuPaul's Drag Race. It originally aired on February 25, 2022. The episode's main challenge tasks contestants with writing, recording, and performing choreography to verses as 1960-inspired girl groups. Alec Mapa is a guest judge.

Daya Betty wins the main challenge. Kerri Colby is eliminated from the competition after placing in the bottom two and losing a lip-sync contest against Jasmine Kennedie to "Un-Break My Heart (Hex Hector Remix)" by Toni Braxton.

== Episode ==
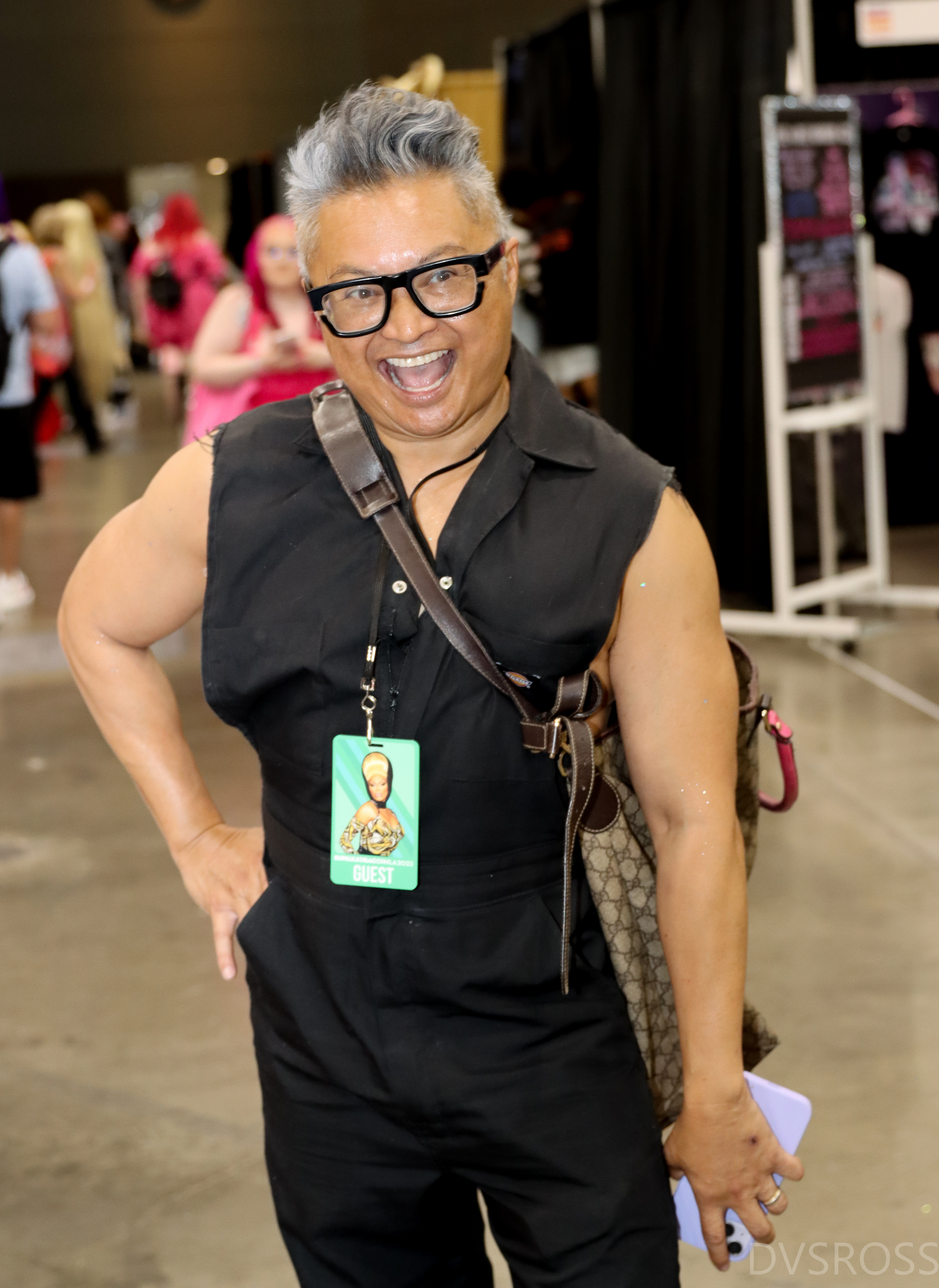
Alec Mapa (pictured at RuPaul's DragCon LA in 2023) is a guest judge.

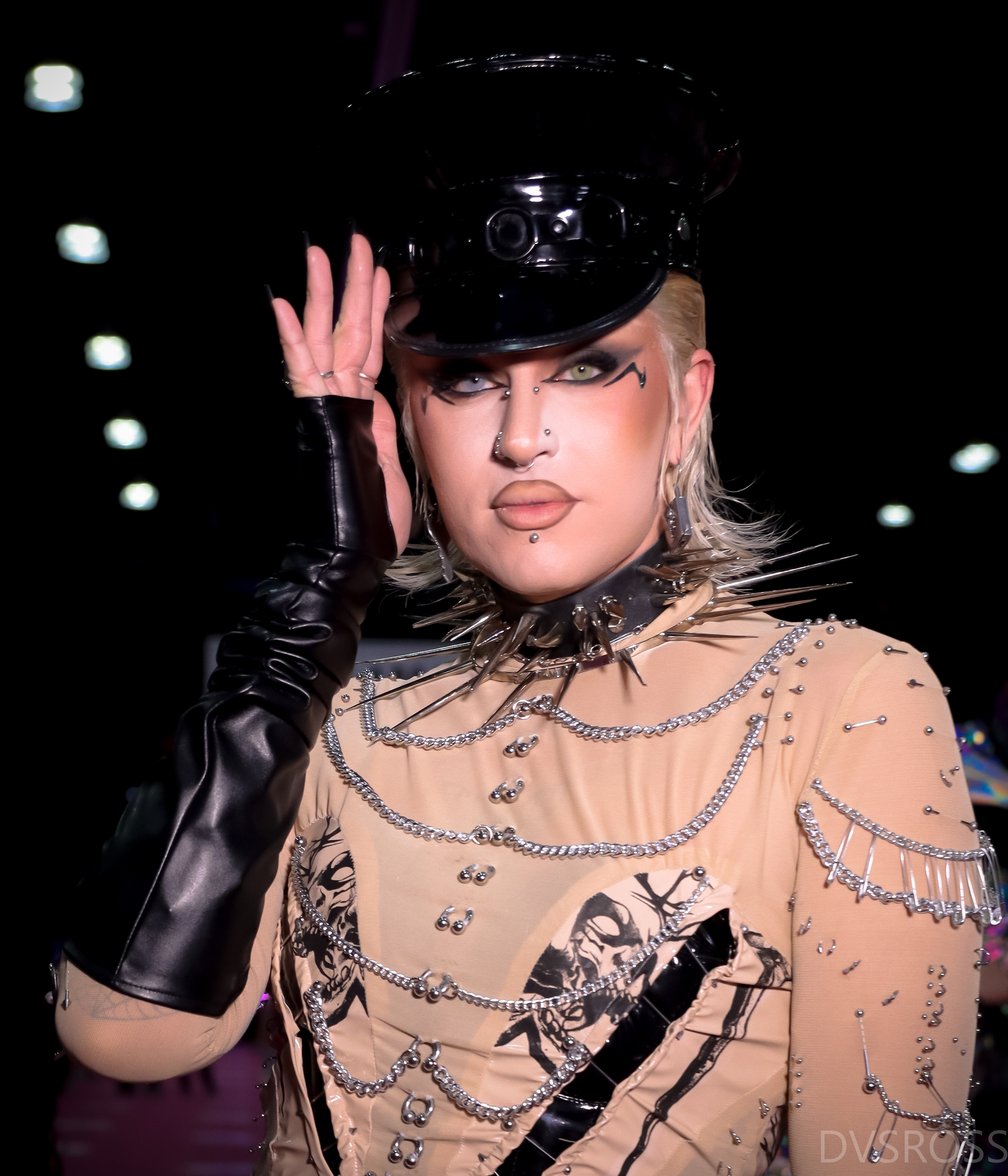
Daya Betty (pictured at RuPaul's DragCon LA in 2023) wins the episode's main challenge.

The contestants return to the Werk Room after no one eliminated on the previous episode. On a new day, RuPaul greets the group and introduces the mini-challenge, which tasks the contestants with "reading" (or playfully insulting) each other. Bosco wins the mini-challenge.

RuPaul then reveals the main challenge, which tasks the contestants with writing, recording, and performing choreography to verses as 1960s-inspired girl groups. The contestants choose their own groups, then begin to writer verses and rehearse. Following are the group names and members:

- The ShangRu-Las: Bosco, Daya Betty, and Willow Pill
- The Ru-Nettes: DeJa Skye, Jasmine Kennedie, and Jorgeous
- The Ru-Premes: Angeria Paris VanMicheals, Kerri Colby, and Lady Camden

The contestants record vocals with Michelle Visage and an audio engineer, then rehearse choreography on the main stage. On elimination day, the contestants make final preparations for the girl group performances and fashion show. The group discuss their favorite girl groups. Kerri Colby shares about her experience growing up in a conservative household and not being allowed to listen to secular music. The group also discuss Bosco's mini-challenge performance. Daya Betty and Jasmine Kennedie get into an argument.

On the main stage, RuPaul welcomes fellow judges Visage and Carson Kressley, as well as guest judge Alec Mapa. RuPaul shares the runway category ("Heart On"), then the girl groups perform. After the fashion show, the judges deliver their critiques, deliberate, and share the results with the group. Angeria Paris VanMicheals, Daya Betty, and DeJa Skye receive positive critiques, and Daya Betty wins the challenge. Jasmine Kennedie, Kerri Colby, and Lady Camden receive negative critiques, and Lady Camden is deemed safe. Jasmine Kennedie and Kerri Colby place in the bottom and face off in a lip-sync contest to "Un-Break My Heart (Hex Hector Remix)" by Toni Braxton. Jasmine Kennedie wins the lip-sync. Kerri Colby opens her chocolate bar to reveal a plain chocolate bar, and is eliminated from the competition.

== Production and broadcast ==
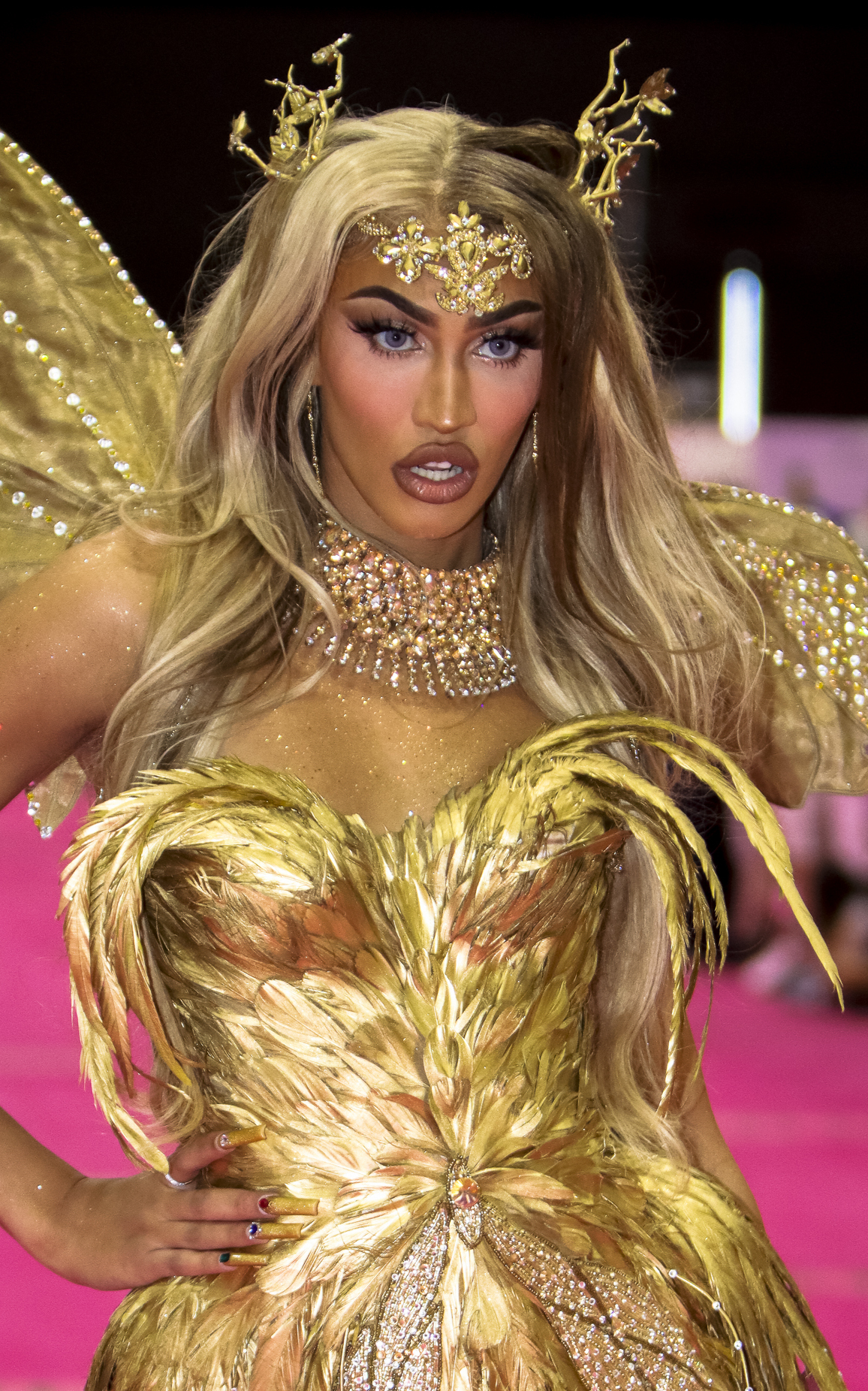
Kerri Colby (pictured at RuPaul's DragCon LA in 2022) is eliminated from the competition.

The episode originally aired on February 25, 2022.

Kerri Colby vogued during the lip-sync. She said the contest was "heartbreaking, literally and figuratively" because of her closeness with Jasmine Kennedie, but that she "came to terms" with her elimination "pretty immediately".

=== Fashion ===
For the main stage, RuPaul wears a gold dress. For the girl group performances, The ShangRu-Las wear black outfits with white ruffled shirts and matching white boots. The group members have different colored wigs. The Ru-Nettes have matching short red dresses, with matching red high-heeled shoes. The three members have similar wig colors. The Ru-Premes wear similar pink dresses and differently styled wigs with a similar color and length. Backup dancers wear T-shirts with black-and-white stripes.

For the fashion show, Willow Pill's tight dress appears to be made of many panties. Daya Betty has a cyberpunk-inspired outfit with many safety pins on her sleeves. Her wig is pink. Bosco's vampire-inspired dress is white. She turns around to expose her buttocks. DeJa Skye's red-and-white outfit has hearts on her shoulders. Her wig is blue. Jorgeous has a red outfit with heart-shaped wings made from ostrich feathers. Jasmine Kennedie's outfit is inspired by Aphrodite, the Greek goddess of love. She wears a large wig and a tiara. Angeria Paris VanMichaels's 1960s- and harajuku-inspired outfit is black and white, with the red text and heart symbol "I ❤ You". She has a blonde wig. Kerri Colby's outfit has red netting and red gloves. She removes a heart from her outfit. Lady Camden wears a Cupid-inspired look with a large heart and arrows. Her wig is blonde and she wears a headpiece.

== Reception ==
Trae DeLellis of The A.V. Club gave the episode a rating a 'B+'. Kevin O'Keeffe of Xtra Magazine said of the lip-sync: "Neither Jasmine nor Kerri was able to balance the dance-y elements with the emoting that fits the original song. It’s only thanks to Jasmine persevering through accidentally losing her shoe that I think ultimately gets her the win." Stephen Daw of Billboard said both contestants offered "soulful" performances. Barry Levitt ranked "Bad Boy Baby" by The ShangRu-Las number 34 in Vulture's 2025 list of the show's best girl group challenges and wrote: "A fun twist on '60s girl groups, the ShangRu-Las skewer classic girl-group style with a song all about a creepy stalker. It's a cute parody, funny ('His body is splattered on the asphalt! / Yeah but it's kinda hot') and sung well. 'Bad Boy Baby' fully commits to parody, which makes it leagues better than the competing girl groups on season 14. It's no surprise that these three ended up as finalists."

== See also ==
- Girl groups in the Drag Race franchise
