= Catwalk (RuPaul's Drag Race) =

- RuPaul's Drag Race episode
- Episode no.: Season 14; Episode 14
- Presented by: RuPaul
- Original air date: April 8, 2022

Episode chronology
← Previous "The Ross Mathews Roast"	Next → "Reunited"

"Catwalk" is the fourteenth episode of the fourteenth season of the American television series RuPaul's Drag Race. It originally aired on April 8, 2022. The episode's main challenge tasks the contestants with writing, recording, and performing choreography to original verses in RuPaul's song "Catwalk". Lady Camden wins the main challenge and no one is eliminated from the competition. The episode won in the Outstanding Production Design for a Variety or Reality Series category at the 74th Primetime Creative Arts Emmy and was nominated in the Variety, Reality, or Competition Series category at the Art Directors Guild Awards 2022.

== Episode ==
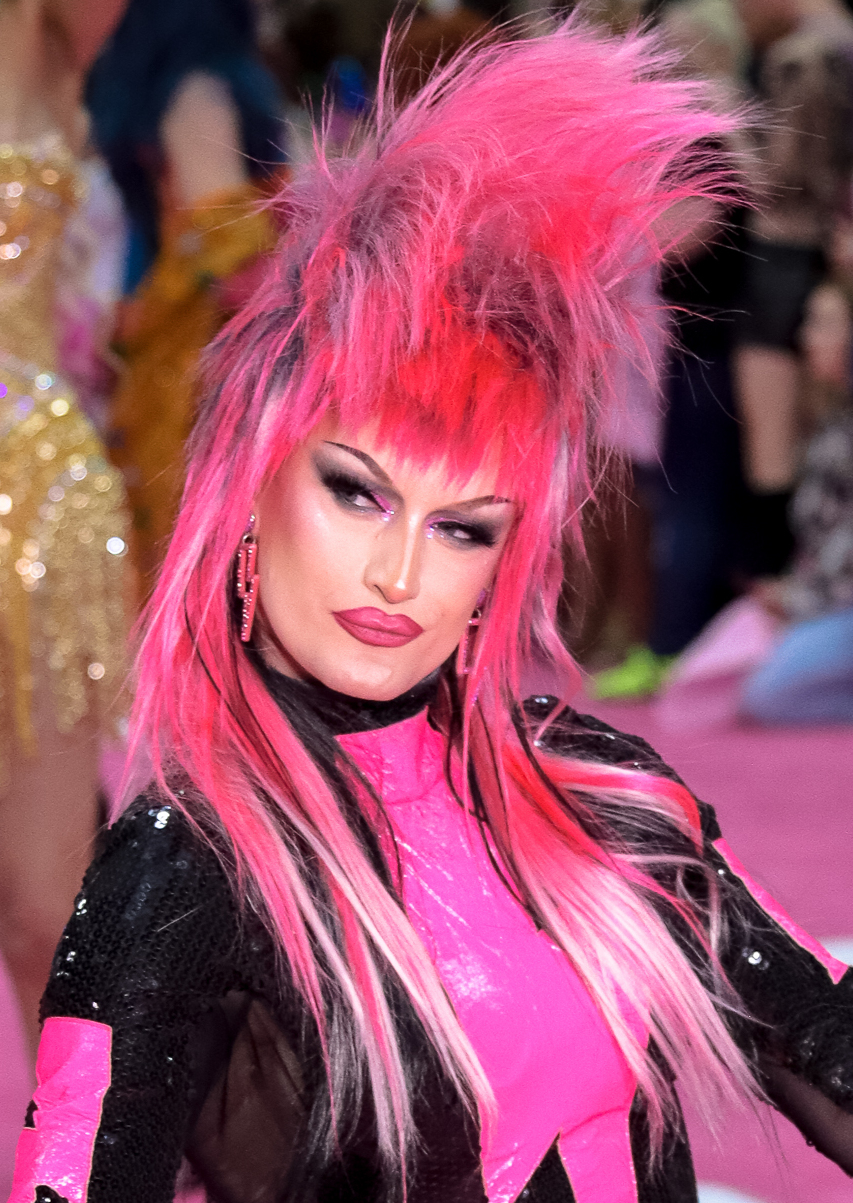
Lady Camden (pictured at RuPaul's DragCon LA in 2023) wins the episode's main challenge.

For the final challenge of the season, the five remaining contestants are tasked with writing, recording, and performing their own verses to RuPaul's song "Catwalk". The contestants rehearse with choreographer Miguel Zarate. The runway category is "You're a Winner Baby". Daya Betty and Lady Camden receive positive critiques, and Lady Camden wins the challenge. Angeria Paris VanMicheals, Bosco, and Willow Pill receive negative critiques, and Bosco is deemed safe. Angeria Paris VanMicheals and Willow Pill place in the bottom and face off in a lip-sync contest to "Telephone" (2010) by Lady Gaga featuring Beyoncé. Both contestants are declared winners of the lip-sync and no one is eliminated from the competition.

== Production and broadcast ==
The episode originally aired on April 8, 2022.

== Reception ==
Trae DeLellis of The A.V. Club gave the episode a rating of 'B-'. Cameron Scheetz ranked the "Telephone" performance eighth in Queerty's list of the season's ten best lip-sync contests. Scheetz wrote: "The episode's narrative played a major role in making this one so memorable, underscoring Angeria and Willow's ride-or-die friendship that dramatically upped the stakes as Ru determined who was worthy of the Grand Finale. Earning their double-shantay, the pair played perfectly into their Gaga/Bey dynamic with heart and humor. The only downside is imagining what these two could've done had they not been limited by their runway gowns." Jordan Robledo of Gay Times called the lip-sync "sensational".

The episode earned production designer Gianna Costa and art director Allison Spain a win in the Outstanding Production Design for a Variety or Reality Series category at the 74th Primetime Creative Arts Emmy Awards. It also earned Costa a nomination in the Variety, Reality, or Competition Series category at the Art Directors Guild Awards 2022.
