= RuPaul's Drag Race season 14 =

2022 season of RuPaul's Drag Race

RuPaul's Drag Race
- Season 14
- Promotional poster for season fourteen
- Hosted by: RuPaul
- Judges: RuPaul; Michelle Visage; Carson Kressley; Ross Mathews
- No. of contestants: 14
- Winner: Willow Pill
- Runner-up: Lady Camden
- Miss Congeniality: Kornbread "The Snack" Jeté
- Companion show: RuPaul's Drag Race: Untucked!
- No. of episodes: 16

Release
- Original network: VH1
- Original release: January 7 – April 22, 2022

Season chronology
- ← Previous; Season 13 Next → Season 15

The fourteenth season of RuPaul's Drag Race premiered on January 7, 2022. The reality competition series, broadcast on VH1 in the United States, showcases 14 new queens competing for the title of "America's Next Drag Superstar". Casting calls for season 14 were opened in November 2020, and the cast was officially revealed by season 13 winner Symone on VH1 on December 2, 2021. The season premiere received 738,000 viewers, making it the most-watched premiere since Season 10.

The season was won by Willow Pill, who became the first transgender contestant to win the main franchise of RuPaul's Drag Race, and the fourth transgender contestant to win overall, with Lady Camden as the runner-up. Kornbread "The Snack" Jeté was named Miss Congeniality, who became the first transgender contestant to win the title.

The season welcomed Maddy Morphosis, the show's first heterosexual, cisgender male contestant. The season notably also featured five transgender contestants: Kerri Colby and Kornbread "The Snack" Jeté (both of whom entered the competition openly trans), Jasmine Kennedie (who came out as a trans woman during filming of the show), Bosco (who came out as a trans woman as the season aired), and Willow Pill (who came out as trans femme as the season aired).

The season featured a "Chocolate Bar Twist" which was introduced in the third episode, which featured each of the contestants being given a chocolate bar, one of which contained a golden bar. After losing a lip sync, each contestant must unwrap their chocolate bar, and the contestant whose bar contains the golden bar is saved from elimination. The twist lasted until episode 12, when Bosco was revealed to have the golden chocolate bar.

This season had a final five going to the grand finale, a first in the show’s history. Additionally, the winning queen received a cash prize of $150,000, the highest in the show's history up to that point. The runner up won a $50,000 cash prize, also a series first. It is also the first series in which a single queen had to lip sync for their life five times; Jorgeous survived four lip syncs and was sent home on the fifth.

== Contestants ==
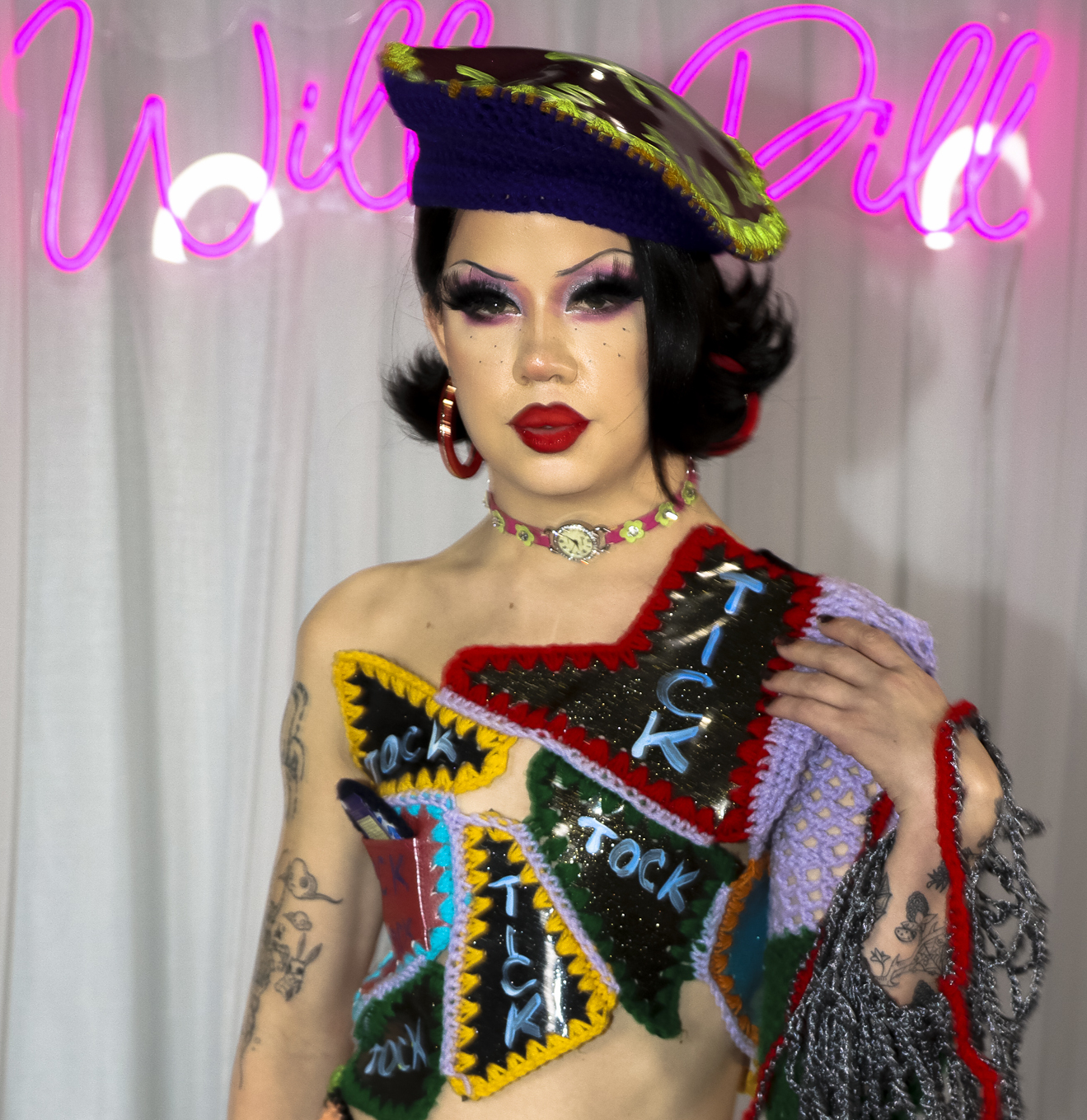
The winner, Willow Pill

Ages, names, and cities stated are at time of filming.

Contestants of RuPaul's Drag Race season 14 and their backgrounds
Contestant	Age	Hometown	Outcome
Willow Pill	26	Denver, Colorado	Winner
Lady Camden	31	Sacramento, California	Runner-up
Angeria Paris VanMicheals	27	Atlanta, Georgia	3rd place (Note: Daya Betty originally placed thirteenth before re-entering the competition.)
Bosco	28	Seattle, Washington	3rd place
Daya Betty	25	Springfield, Missouri	3rd place
DeJa Skye	31	Fresno, California	6th place
Jorgeous	21	Nashville, Tennessee	6th place
Jasmine Kennedie	22	New York City, New York	8th place
Kerri Colby	24	Los Angeles, California	9th place
Maddy Morphosis	26	Fayetteville, Arkansas	10th place
Orion Story	25	Grand Rapids, Michigan	11th place (Note: Orion Story originally placed thirteenth before re-entering the competition.)
Kornbread "The Snack" Jeté	29	Los Angeles, California	12th place (Note: Kornbread "The Snack" Jeté left the competition due to an ankle injury. She was later voted Miss Congeniality by fellow contestants.)
Alyssa Hunter	26	Cataño, Puerto Rico	13th place
June Jambalaya	29	Los Angeles, California	14th place

== Contestant progress ==
Legend:

Willow Pill won RuPaul's Drag Race season 14.
Lady Camden was the runner-up.
Kornbread "The Snack" Jeté was voted Miss Congeniality (Miss C) by fellow contestants.
Maddy Morphosis won the Golden Boot (GB) for having the worst look of the season.
WIN indicates that the contestant won the challenge.
TOP2 indicates that the contestant was one of the two best performing in the challenge, but lost the lip sync to win it.
STAY indicates that the contestant won one of the LaLaPaRuZa lip syncs and remained in the competition.
IMM (Immunity) indicates that, having won the previous week's challenge, DeJa Skye was immune from elimination.
SAFE indicates that the contestant was declared safe by the judges.
Bosco lost the lip sync, but was revealed to possess the golden chocolate bar (GCB) and therefore saved from elimination.
BTM (Bottom) indicates that the contestant was up for elimination.
ELIM (Eliminated) indicates that the contestant was eliminated.
WDR (Withdraw) indicates that Kornbread "The Snack" Jeté was removed from the competition due to an injury.
Guest indicates that the contestant returned as a guest.

Contestants progress with placements in each episode
Contestant	Episode															
Contestant	1	2	3	4	5	6	7	8	9	10	11	12	13	14	15	16
Willow Pill	SAFE		WIN	SAFE	SAFE	SAFE	SAFE	SAFE	SAFE	BTM	STAY	SAFE	SAFE	BTM	Guest	Winner
Lady Camden		SAFE	SAFE	SAFE	SAFE	SAFE	WIN	SAFE	SAFE	BTM	STAY	WIN	SAFE	WIN	Guest	Runner-up
Angeria Paris VanMicheals		WIN	SAFE	WIN	SAFE	SAFE	SAFE	SAFE	SAFE	BTM	STAY	SAFE	SAFE	BTM	Guest	Eliminated
Bosco	SAFE		SAFE	SAFE	WIN	SAFE	SAFE	SAFE	WIN	BTM	STAY	GCB	WIN	SAFE	Guest	Eliminated
Daya Betty		ELIM	SAFE	SAFE	SAFE	SAFE	TOP2	WIN	SAFE	BTM	STAY	SAFE	BTM	SAFE	Guest	Eliminated
DeJa Skye		BTM	SAFE	SAFE	SAFE	SAFE	SAFE	SAFE	SAFE	WIN	IMM	SAFE	ELIM		Guest	Guest
Jorgeous		SAFE	SAFE	SAFE	BTM	WIN	SAFE	SAFE	BTM	BTM	STAY	BTM	ELIM		Guest	Guest
Jasmine Kennedie		SAFE	SAFE	SAFE	SAFE	BTM	SAFE	BTM	BTM	BTM	ELIM				Guest	Guest
Kerri Colby	SAFE		SAFE	BTM	SAFE	SAFE	SAFE	ELIM							Guest	Guest
Maddy Morphosis		SAFE	BTM	SAFE	SAFE	ELIM									GB	Guest
Orion Story	ELIM		SAFE	SAFE	ELIM										Guest	Guest
Kornbread "The Snack" Jeté	WIN		SAFE	SAFE	WDR										Guest	Miss C
Alyssa Hunter	SAFE		SAFE	ELIM											Guest	Guest
June Jambalaya	BTM		ELIM												Guest	Guest

== Lip syncs ==
Legend:

The contestant was eliminated after their first time in the bottom.
The contestant was eliminated after their second time in the bottom.
The contestant was eliminated after their fourth time in the bottom.
The contestant was eliminated after their fifth time in the bottom.
The contestant won the lip sync to win the challenge.
The contestant won the first round of the Lip Sync LaLaPaRuZa Smackdown and remained in the competition.
The contestant won the second round of the Lip Sync LaLaPaRuZa Smackdown and remained in the competition.
The contestant won the Lip Sync for the Crown and was declared the winner of the season.

Episode	Contestants			Song	Eliminated
1	June Jambalaya	vs.	Orion Story	"Water Me" (Lizzo)	Orion Story
2	Daya Betty	vs.	Deja Skye	"Fallin'" (Alicia Keys)	Daya Betty
3	June Jambalaya	vs.	Maddy Morphosis	"I Love It" (Kylie Minogue)	June Jambalaya
4	Alyssa Hunter	vs.	Kerri Colby	"Play" (Jennifer Lopez)	Alyssa Hunter
5	Jorgeous	vs.	Orion Story	"My Head & My Heart" (Ava Max)	Orion Story
6	Jasmine Kennedie	vs.	Maddy Morphosis	"Suga Mama" (Beyoncé)	Maddy Morphosis
Episode	Contestants			Song	Winner
7	Daya Betty	vs.	Lady Camden	"One Way or Another" (Blondie)	Lady Camden
Episode	Contestants			Song	Eliminated
8	Jasmine Kennedie	vs.	Kerri Colby	"Un-Break My Heart (Soul-Hex Radio Mix)" (Toni Braxton)	Kerri Colby
9	Jasmine Kennedie	vs.	Jorgeous	"Something's Got a Hold on Me" (Etta James)	None
Episode (Note: In episode 10, DeJa Skye was asked to perform a solo lip sync to "Levitating" by Dua Lipa after winning the challenge. This lip sync was cut from the show for unknown reasons.)	Contestants			Song	Winner
11	Daya Betty	vs.	Jasmine Kennedie	"Respect" (Aretha Franklin)	Daya Betty
11	Bosco	vs.	Willow Pill	"Never Too Much" (Luther Vandross)	Willow Pill
11	Angeria Paris VanMicheals vs. Jorgeous vs. Lady Camden			"Radio" (Beyoncé)	Jorgeous
11	Bosco	vs.	Lady Camden	"Don't Let Go (Love)" (En Vogue)	Lady Camden
11	Angeria Paris VanMicheals	vs.	Jasmine Kennedie	"Love Don't Cost a Thing" (Jennifer Lopez)	Angeria Paris VanMicheals
11	Contestants			Song	Eliminated
11	Bosco	vs.	Jasmine Kennedie	"Swept Away" (Diana Ross)	Jasmine Kennedie
12	Bosco	vs.	Jorgeous	"Heartbreak Hotel (Hex Hector Remix)" (Whitney Houston ft. Faith Evans, Kelly Price)	None (Note: Bosco lost the lip sync but was revealed to possess the golden chocolate bar and was saved from elimination.)
13	Daya Betty vs. DeJa Skye vs. Jorgeous			"Good 4 U" (Olivia Rodrigo)	DeJa Skye
13	Daya Betty vs. DeJa Skye vs. Jorgeous			"Good 4 U" (Olivia Rodrigo)	Jorgeous
14	Angeria Paris VanMicheals	vs.	Willow Pill	"Telephone" (Lady Gaga ft. Beyoncé)	None
Episode	Final contestants			Song	Winner
16	Lady Camden	vs.	Willow Pill	"Gimme! Gimme! Gimme! (A Man After Midnight)" (Cher)	Willow Pill

== Guest judges ==
- Lizzo, singer and songwriter
- Alicia Keys, singer and songwriter
- Christine Chiu, businesswoman, philanthropist and television personality
- Loni Love, comedian and television host
- Ava Max, singer
- Taraji P. Henson, actress and singer
- Ts Madison, television and internet personality, LGBTQ+ activist
- Alec Mapa, actor
- Nicole Byer, comedian and actress
- Dove Cameron, actress and singer
- Andra Day, singer and actress
- Dulcé Sloan, comedian

=== Special guests ===
Guests who appeared in episodes, but did not judge on the main stage.

Episodes 1 and 2

- Albert Sanchez, photographer

Episode 4

- Jennifer Lopez, singer, actress, dancer

Episode 5

- Jaymes Mansfield, contestant on season 9
- Kahmora Hall, contestant on season 13
- Tempest DuJour, contestant on season 7
- Sarah McLachlan, singer and songwriter

Episode 8

- David Benjamin Steinberg, songwriter and music producer

Episode 10

- Raven, runner-up of season 2 and of All Stars season 1

Episode 12

- Leland, producer
- Leslie Jordan, actor
- Miguel Zarate, choreographer

Episode 13

- Norvina, president of Anastasia Beverly Hills

Episode 15

- LaLa Ri, contestant on season 13
- Derrick Barry, contestant on season 8 and All Stars season 5
- Kahanna Montrese, contestant on season 11
- Alexis Mateo, contestant on season 3; All Stars season 1 and 5

Episode 16

- Jaida Essence Hall, winner of season 12
- Kameron Michaels, contestant on season 10
- Trinity K. Bonet, contestant on season 6 and All Stars season 6
- Naomi Smalls, contestant on season 8 and All Stars season 4
- Derrick Barry, contestant on season 8 and All Stars season 5
- Kahanna Montrese, contestant on season 11
- Hot Chocolate, entertainer and drag queen
- Symone, winner of season 13
- LaLa Ri, contestant on and Miss Congeniality of season 13

== Episodes ==
No. overall	No. in series	Title	Original release date
176	1	"Big Opening #1"	January 7, 2022
Seven new queens enter the workroom. They find out that this season will have a split premiere. For the first mini-challenge, the queens will do a photoshoot while strapped to a spinning wheel. Kerri Colby wins the mini-challenge. For the main challenge, the queens will perform a talent show in front of the judges.: Alyssa Hunter - Lip-syncing; Bosco - Burlesque; June Jambalaya - African dance; Kerri Colby - Jump roping and lip-syncing; Kornbread "The Snack" Jeté - Original song; Orion Story - Comedy skit; Willow Pill - Self-care in quarantine; On the runway, category is Signature Show-Stopping Drag. Bosco, Kornbread "The Snack" Jeté and Willow Pill receive positive critiques, with Kornbread "The Snack" Jeté winning the challenge. Alyssa Hunter, June Jambalaya and Orion Story receive negative critiques, with Alyssa Hunter being safe. June Jambalaya and Orion Story lip-sync to "Water Me" by Lizzo. June Jambalaya wins the lip-sync and Orion Story sashays away.: Guest Judge: Lizzo; Alternating Judge: Ross Mathews; Mini-Challenge: Photoshoot on a spinning wheel; Mini-Challenge Winner: Kerri Colby; Mini-Challenge Prize: A $2,500 cash tip courtesy of J.J. Malibu; Main Challenge: Perform a talent show in front of the judges; Runway Theme: Signature Show-Stopping Drag; Challenge Winner: Kornbread “The Snack” Jeté; Challenge Prize: A $5,000 cash tip; Bottom Two: June Jambalaya and Orion Story; Lip-Sync Song: "Water Me" by Lizzo; Eliminated: Orion Story; Farewell Message: "Cross your fingers + toes b/c the whole world is about to know, we did THAT 💋 i ♡ you all :)"
177	2	"Big Opening #2"	January 14, 2022
The remaining seven queens enter the workroom. For the mini-challenge, the queens will do a photoshoot in a bowl of tic-tacs. Angeria Paris VanMicheals wins the mini-challenge. For the main challenge, the queens will perform a talent show in front of the judges.: Angeria Paris VanMicheals - Original song; Daya Betty - Lip-syncing; DeJa Skye - Cheerleading comedy routine; Jasmine Kennedie - Lip-syncing and dancing; Jorgeous - Lip-syncing; Lady Camden - Ballet routine; Maddy Morphosis - Electric guitar; On the runway, category is Sickening Signature Drag. Angeria Paris VanMicheals, Jorgeous and Lady Camden receive positive critiques, with Angeria Paris VanMicheals winning the challenge. Daya Betty, DeJa Skye and Maddy Morphosis receive negative critiques, with Maddy Morphosis being safe. Daya Betty and DeJa Skye lip-sync to "Fallin’" by Alicia Keys. DeJa Skye wins the lip-sync and Daya Betty sashays away.: Guest Judge: Alicia Keys; Alternating Judge: Carson Kressley; Mini-Challenge: Photoshoot in a bowl of tic-tacs; Mini-Challenge Winner: Angeria Paris VanMicheals; Mini-Challenge Prize: A $2,500 cash tip courtesy of J.J. Malibu; Main Challenge: Perform a talent show in front of the judges; Runway Theme: Sickening Signature Drag; Challenge Winner: Angeria Paris VanMicheals; Challenge Prize: A $5,000 cash tip; Bottom Two: Daya Betty and DeJa Skye; Lip-Sync Song: "Fallin'" by Alicia Keys; Eliminated: Daya Betty; Farewell Message: "Stay Positive. Be Kind. Stay You! - Love Daya"
178	3	"A Pair of Balls"	January 21, 2022
At the beginning of the episode, RuPaul announces that previously eliminated queens Orion Story and Daya Betty will be returning to the competition. RuPaul then reveals the twist of the season: each queen will choose a RuPaul chocolate bar. When a queen loses a Lip Sync for Your Life, they will open their chocolate bar. If it contains a gold bar, they will be saved from elimination; otherwise, they will sashay away. For the main challenge, the episode one queens will create three looks for The Hide and Chic Ball: Zebra Print Resort, Leopard Evening Wear and Animal Print Bridal Couture. The episode two queens will create three looks for The Red, White and Blue Ball: Red Hot Resort, Evening Wear: All In White and Red, White and Blue Bridal Couture. On the runway, Angeria Paris VanMicheals, Jorgeous and Willow Pill receive positive critiques, with Willow Pill winning the challenge. June Jambalaya, Maddy Morphosis and Orion Story receive negative critiques, with Orion Story being safe. June Jambalaya and Maddy Morphosis lip-sync to "I Love It" by Kylie Minogue. Maddy Morphosis wins the lip-sync. June Jambalaya then opens her chocolate bar to reveal a plain chocolate bar and sashays away.: Guest Judge: Christine Chiu; Alternating Judge: Carson Kressley; Returned: Daya Betty and Orion Story; Main Challenge: The Hide and Chic Ball and The Red, White and Blue Ball; Runway Themes: Group 1: Zebra Print Resort, Leopard Evening Wear and Animal Print Bridal Couture; Group 2: Red Hot Resort, Evening Wear: All In White and Red, White and Blue Bridal Couture; Challenge Winner: Willow Pill; Challenge Prize: A $5,000 cash tip; Bottom Two: June Jambalaya and Maddy Morphosis; Lip-Sync Song: "I Love It" by Kylie Minogue; Eliminated: June Jambalaya; Farewell Message: "Thank you For Finally giving me my Drag Family - June"
179	4	"She's a Super Tease"	January 28, 2022
For this week's main challenge, the queens will team up and produce attention grabbing superteases for Season 14.: Team 1 - Bosco, Jasmine Kennedie, Jorgeous, Kerri Colby, Kornbread "The Snack" Jeté, Lady Camden and Willow Pill; Team 2 - Alyssa Hunter, Angeria Paris VanMicheals, Daya Betty, DeJa Skye, Maddy Morphosis and Orion Story; On the runway, category is Night of a Thousand Jennifer Lopez's. Angeria Paris VanMicheals, DeJa Skye and Willow Pill receive positive critiques, with Angeria Paris VanMicheals winning the challenge. Alyssa Hunter, Kerri Colby and Kornbread "The Snack" Jeté receive negative critiques, with Kornbread "The Snack" Jeté being safe. Alyssa Hunter and Kerri Colby lip-sync to "Play" by Jennifer Lopez. Kerri Colby wins the lip-sync. Alyssa Hunter then opens her chocolate bar to reveal a plain chocolate bar and sashays away.: Guest Judge: Loni Love; Alternating Judge: Ross Mathews; Main Challenge: In teams, produce attention grabbing superteases for Season 14; Runway Theme: Night of a Thousand Jennifer Lopez's; Challenge Winner: Angeria Paris VanMicheals; Challenge Prize: A $5,000 cash tip; Bottom Two: Alyssa Hunter and Kerri Colby; Lip-Sync Song: "Play" by Jennifer Lopez; Eliminated: Alyssa Hunter; Farewell Message: "Believe In Your Self "Perrasss" ♡ Your Latina Queen"
180	5	"Save a Queen"	February 4, 2022
At the beginning of the episode, it is revealed that Kornbread "The Snack" Jeté has been removed from the competition due to an ankle injury she sustained last episode. For this week's main challenge, the queens will team up and write a commercial to get donations for "Save A Queen", a charity that raises awareness for first-eliminated queens.: Team Jaymes Mansfield - Jasmine Kennedie, Maddy Morphosis, Orion Story and Willow Pill; Team Kahmora Hall - Bosco, Daya Betty and Lady Camden; Team Tempest DuJour - Angeria Paris VanMicheals, DeJa Skye, Jorgeous and Kerri Colby; On the runway, category is Spring Has Sprung. Angeria Paris VanMicheals, Bosco and Lady Camden receive positive critiques, with Bosco winning the challenge. Jasmine Kennedie, Jorgeous and Orion Story receive negative critiques, with Jasmine Kennedie being safe. Jorgeous and Orion Story lip-sync to "My Head & My Heart by Ava Max. Jorgeous wins the lip-sync. Orion Story then opens her chocolate bar to reveal a plain chocolate bar and sashays away.: Guest Judge: Ava Max; Alternating Judge: Ross Mathews; Removed: Kornbread "The Snack" Jeté; Main Challenge: In teams, write a commercial to get donations for "Save A Queen", a charity that raises awareness for first-eliminated queens; Runway Theme: Spring Has Sprung; Challenge Winner: Bosco; Challenge Prize: A $5,000 cash tip; Bottom Two: Jorgeous and Orion Story; Lip-Sync Song: "My Head & My Heart" by Ava Max; Eliminated: Orion Story; Farewell Message: "Biiiitchhh ya'll put up a damn good fight I love you all so so so much! Keep being your absolutely beautiful selves ♡♡♡ Peace, love, and meatballs :)"
181	6	"Glamazon Prime"	February 11, 2022
For this week's main challenge, the queens will create an outfit made from junk that Michelle Visage has bought online. On the runway, category is Glamazon Primetime. Angeria Paris VanMicheals, Jorgeous and Lady Camden receive positive critiques, with Jorgeous winning the challenge. DeJa Skye, Jasmine Kennedi and Maddy Morphosis receive negative critiques, with DeJa Skye being safe. Jasmine Kennedie and Maddy Morphosis lip-sync to "Suga Mama" by Beyoncé. Jasmine Kennedie wins the lip-sync. Maddy Morphosis then opens her chocolate bar to reveal a plain chocolate bar, and sashays away.: Guest Judge: Taraji P. Henson; Alternating Judge: Carson Kressley; Main Challenge: Create an outfit made from junk that Michelle Visage has bought online; Runway Theme: Glamazon Primetime; Challenge Winner: Jorgeous; Challenge Prize: A $5,000 cash tip; Bottom Two: Jasmine Kennedie and Maddy Morphosis; Lip-Sync Song: "Suga Mama" by Beyoncé; Eliminated: Maddy Morphosis; Farewell Message: "Don't be afraid to be yourself ♡, be kind, and be STUPID. - Maddy"
182	7	"The Daytona Wind"	February 18, 2022
For this week's main challenge, the queens will act in an 80's soap opera parody called "The Daytona Wind".: Angeria Paris VanMicheals plays Maxine O'Hara; Bosco plays Fancy Micheals; Daya Betty plays Micheals Sister #1; DeJa Skye plays Maggie O'Hara; Jasmine Kennedie plays Hattie Ruth; Jorgeous plays Sierra Micheals; Kerri Colby plays Deandra Davenport; Lady Camden plays Leona Micheals; Willow Pill plays Micheals Sister #2; On the runway, category is Chaps on the Runway. Bosco, Daya Betty, Jasmine Kennedie, Jorgeous, Lady Camden and Willow Pill receive positive critiques. It is then revealed that Daya Betty and Lady Camden are the top two queens of the week and lip-sync for the win. They lip-sync to "One Way or Another" by Blondie. After the lip-sync, Lady Camden is announced as the winner of the challenge. RuPaul then announces that no one is going home.: Guest Judge: Ts Madison; Alternating Judge: Ross Mathews; Main Challenge: Act in an 80's soap opera called "The Daytona Wind"; Runway Theme: Chaps on the Runway; Top Two: Daya Betty and Lady Camden; Lip-Sync Song: "One Way or Another" by Blondie; Challenge Winner: Lady Camden; Challenge Prize: A $5,000 cash tip; Note: Ts Madison appeared in the soap opera as the priest alongside Pit Crew member Calixto Quan as Diesel O'Hara.
183	8	"60s Girl Groups"	February 25, 2022
For this week's mini-challenge, the queens will read each other to filth. Bosco wins the mini-challenge. For the main challenge, the queens will write, record, and perform verses as 60s inspired girl groups.: The ShangRu-Las - Bosco, Daya Betty and Willow Pill; The Ru-Nettes - DeJa Skye, Jasmine Kennedie and Jorgeous; The Ru-Premes - Angeria Paris VanMicheals, Kerri Colby and Lady Camden; On the runway, category is Heart On. Angeria Paris VanMicheals, Daya Betty and DeJa Skye receive positive critiques, with Daya Betty winning the challenge. Jasmine Kennedie, Kerri Colby and Lady Camden receive negative critiques, with Lady Camden being safe. Jasmine Kennedie and Kerri Colby lip-sync to "Un-Break My Heart" (Soul-Hex Radio Mix) by Toni Braxton. Jasmine Kennedie wins the lip-sync. Kerri Colby then opens her chocolate bar to reveal a plain chocolate bar, and sashays away.: Guest Judge: Alec Mapa; Alternating Judge: Carson Kressley; Mini-Challenge: Reading is Fundamental; Mini-Challenge Winner: Bosco; Mini-Challenge Prize: A $2,500 cash tip courtesy of Sweet Tarts; Main Challenge: Write, record, and perform verses as 60s inspired girl groups; Runway Theme: Heart On; Challenge Winner: Daya Betty; Challenge Prize: A $5,000 cash tip; Bottom Two: Jasmine Kennedie and Kerri Colby; Lip-Sync Song: "Un-Break My Heart" (Soul-Hex Radio Mix) by Toni Braxton; Eliminated: Kerri Colby; Farewell Message: "You Ladies truly are a blessing to me & to the world you each are ALL STARS ♡ Kerri Colby"
184	9	"Menzeses"	March 4, 2022
For this week's mini-challenge, the queens will photobomb famous male celebrities. Willow Pill wins the mini-challenge. For the main challenge, the queens will team up and create a RuPaul's DragCon panel discussion about men.: Men: A Work In Progress - Angeria Paris VanMicheals, DeJa Skye, Lady Camden and Willow Pill; Men: Electric Boogaloo, Part II - Bosco, Daya Betty, Jasmine Kennedie and Jorgeous; On the runway, category is Shoulder Pads. Bosco, DeJa Skye and Willow Pill receive positive critiques, with Bosco winning the challenge. Daya Betty, Jasmine Kennedie and Jorgeous receive negative critiques, with Daya Betty being safe. Jasmine Kennedie and Jorgeous lip-sync to "Something's Got a Hold on Me" by Etta James. Both queens win the lip-sync and no one goes home.: Guest Judge: Nicole Byer; Alternating Judge: Carson Kressley; Mini-Challenge: Photobomb famous male celebrities; Mini-Challenge Winner: Willow Pill; Mini-Challenge Prize: A $2,500 cash tip; Main Challenge: In teams, create a RuPaul's DragCon panel discussion about men; Runway Theme: Shoulder Pads; Challenge Winner: Bosco; Challenge Prize: A $5,000 cash tip; Bottom Two: Jasmine Kennedie and Jorgeous; Lip-Sync Song: "Something's Got a Hold on Me" by Etta James; Eliminated: None
185	10	"Snatch Game"	March 11, 2022
For this week's mini-challenge, the queens will create an outfit made from bubble wrap. Bosco wins the mini-challenge. For the main challenge, the queens will play Snatch Game, with Dove Cameron and Raven as the celebrity contestants. The Snatch Game panelists consist of: Angeria Paris VanMicheals as Tammie Brown; Bosco as Gwyneth Paltrow; Daya Betty as Ozzy Osbourne; DeJa Skye as Lil Jon; Jasmine Kennedie as Betsy DeVos; Jorgeous as Ilana Glazer; Lady Camden as William Shakespeare; Willow Pill as Drew Barrymore; On the runway, category is Holy Couture. DeJa Skye wins the challenge. The seven remaining queens receive negative critiques, with Angeria Paris VanMicheals, Bosco, Daya Betty, Jasmine Kennedie, Jorgeous, Lady Camden, and Willow Pill all in the bottom. RuPaul defers any elimination until next week, to be determined by a special lip-sync tournament LaLaPaRUza smackdown.: Guest Judge: Dove Cameron; Alternating Judge: Carson Kressley; Mini-Challenge: Create an outfit made from bubble wrap; Mini-Challenge Winner: Bosco; Mini-Challenge Prize: A $2,500 cash tip; Main Challenge: Snatch Game; Runway Theme: Holy Couture; Challenge Winner: DeJa Skye; Challenge Prize: A $5,000 cash tip; Bottom Seven: Angeria Paris VanMicheals, Bosco, Daya Betty, Jasmine Kennedie, Jorgeous, Lady Camden, and Willow Pill
186	11	"An Extra Special Episode"	March 18, 2022
The bottom seven queens from last week compete in the lip-sync LaLaPaRUza Smackdown to determine who will be eliminated. A pit crew member randomly picks a ball with a queen's initials, determining who will lip-sync first. The selected queen then chooses their lip-sync opponent, who in turn chooses the lip-sync song. The tournament continues in successive rounds, with losing queens competing in multiple rounds, until one last lip-sync determines who will be eliminated. In the first round, Jasmine Kennedie gets picked first and chooses Daya Betty to lip-sync against. Daya Betty then chooses "Respect" by Aretha Franklin. Daya Betty wins the lip-sync and Jasmine Kennedie loses. Willow Pill is next to be picked, and chooses Bosco to lip-sync against. Bosco chooses "Never Too Much" by Luther Vandross. Willow Pill wins the lip-sync and Bosco loses. The final three queens, Angeria Paris VanMicheals, Jorgeous and Lady Camden, will lip-sync last. The pit crew chooses Jorgeous' name and she picks "Radio" by Beyoncé to lip-sync to. Jorgeous wins the lip-sync and Angeria Paris VanMicheals and Lady Camden lose. In the second round, Lady Camden gets picked first and chooses Bosco to lip-sync against. Bosco chooses "Don't Let Go (Love)" by En Vogue. Lady Camden wins the lip-sync and Bosco loses. Angeria Paris VanMicheals and Jasmine Kennedie then lip-sync to "Love Don't Cost a Thing" by Jennifer Lopez. Angeria Paris VanMicheals wins the lip-sync and Jasmine Kennedie loses. In the final round, Bosco and Jasmine Kennedie lip-sync to "Swept Away" by Diana Ross. Bosco wins the lip-sync. Jasmine Kennedie then opens her chocolate bar to reveal a plain chocolate bar and sashays away.: Alternating Judges: Carson Kressley and Ross Mathews; Main Challenge: Perform in a lip-sync LaLaPaRUza smackdown; Lip-Sync Songs: "Respect" by Aretha Franklin, "Never Too Much" by Luther Vandross, "Radio" by Beyoncé, "Don't Let Go (Love)" by En Vogue, "Love Don't Cost a Thing" by Jennifer Lopez, and "Swept Away" by Diana Ross; Lip-Sync for Your Life Winners: Angeria Paris VanMicheals, Bosco, Daya Betty, Jorgeous, Lady Camden and Willow Pill; Eliminated: Jasmine Kennedie; Farewell Message: "Dear Ladies I'm so happy to have found a sisters from you all, Hope you all the best P.S. Angie, DeJa, Jorgeous go all the way My forever sisters, Love Jasmine Kennedie <3"
187	12	"Moulin Ru: The Rusical"	March 25, 2022
For this week's main challenge, the queens will perform in Moulin Ru: The Rusical.: Angeria Paris VanMicheals plays Charisma; Bosco plays Saltine; Daya Betty plays Uniqueness; DeJa Skye plays Nerve; Jorgeous plays Talent; Lady Camden plays Mama Z; Willow Pill plays Green Fairy; On the runway, category is Mirror, Mirror. Daya Betty, Lady Camden and Willow Pill receive positive critiques, with Lady Camden winning the challenge. Bosco, DeJa Skye and Jorgeous receive negative critiques, with DeJa Skye being safe. Bosco and Jorgeous lip-sync to "Heartbreak Hotel" (Hex Hector Remix) by Whitney Houston featuring Faith Evans and Kelly Price. Jorgeous wins the lip-sync. Bosco then opens her chocolate bar to reveal the gold chocolate bar, and is saved from elimination.: Alternating Judge: Ross Mathews; Guest Judge: Andra Day; Main Challenge: Moulin Ru: The Rusical; Runway Theme: Mirror, Mirror; Challenge Winner: Lady Camden; Challenge Prize: A $5,000 cash tip and a trip to New York with tickets to Moulin Rouge; Bottom Two: Bosco and Jorgeous; Lip-Sync Song: "Heartbreak Hotel" (Hex Hector Remix) by Whitney Houston featuring Faith Evans and Kelly Price; Eliminated: None
188	13	"The Ross Mathews Roast"	April 1, 2022
For this week's mini-challenge, the queens will team up and paint a mural of either Dolly Parton or RuPaul. Team Dolly Parton consists of Bosco, Daya Betty, Lady Camden and Willow Pill. Team RuPaul consists of Angeria Paris VanMicheals, DeJa Skye and Jorgeous. Team Dolly Parton wins the mini-challenge. For the main challenge, the queens will perform a roast of Ross Mathews. On the runway, category is Tutu Much. Angeria Paris VanMicheals, Bosco, Lady Camden and Willow Pill receive positive critiques, with Bosco winning the challenge. Daya Betty, DeJa Skye and Jorgeous receive negative critiques, and are announced as the bottom three. They lip-sync to "Good 4 U" by Olivia Rodrigo. Daya Betty wins the lip-sync and DeJa Skye and Jorgeous sashay away.: Alternating Judge: Ross Mathews; Guest Judge: Dulcé Sloan; Mini-Challenge: In teams, paint a mural of Dolly Parton or RuPaul; Mini-Challenge Winners: Bosco, Daya Betty, Lady Camden and Willow Pill; Mini-Challenge Prize: $1,500 worth of Anastasia Beverly Hills cosmetics; Main Challenge: Perform a roast of Ross Mathews; Runway Theme: Tutu Much; Challenge Winner: Bosco; Challenge Prize: A $5,000 cash tip; Bottom Three: Daya Betty, DeJa Skye and Jorgeous; Lip-Sync Song: "Good 4 U" by Olivia Rodrigo; Eliminated: DeJa Skye and Jorgeous; DeJa Skye's Farewell Message: "Embrace the curves. Sistah 4 Life. I <3 u all. Ps do you? - Deja Skye <3"; Jorgeous' Farewell Message: "Success is a journey not a destination. I love you all very much- Gorgeous like Jorgeous <3"
189	14	"Catwalk"	April 8, 2022
For the final challenge of the season, the queens will write, record and perform their own verses to RuPaul's song "Catwalk". On the runway, category is You're A Winner Baby. Daya Betty and Lady Camden receive positive critiques, with Lady Camden winning the challenge. Angeria Paris VanMicheals, Bosco and Willow Pill receive negative critiques, with Bosco being safe. Angeria Paris VanMicheals and Willow Pill lip-sync to "Telephone" by Lady Gaga ft. Beyoncé. Both queens win the lip-sync and no one goes home.: Main Challenge: Write, record and perform their own verses to RuPaul's song "Catwalk"; Runway Theme: You're A Winner Baby; Challenge Winner: Lady Camden; Challenge Prize: A $5,000 cash tip; Bottom Two: Angeria Paris VanMicheals and Willow Pill; Lip-Sync Song: "Telephone" by Lady Gaga ft. Beyoncé; Eliminated: None
190	15	"Reunited"	April 15, 2022
The queens all return for the reunion. Discussions include: Kornbread "The Snack" Jeté's departure from the season, the fights that happened this season and the trans excellence of the season, with Bosco, Jasmine Kennedie, Kerri Colby, Kornbread "The Snack" Jeté and Willow Pill. Maddy Morphosis receives the Golden Boot Award for her episode six Glamazon Prime look.
191	16	"Grand Finale"	April 22, 2022
All the queens return for the grand finale. The final five queens then perform to a song that was written specifically for them. Angeria Paris VanMicheals lip-syncs to "Check My Track Record", Bosco lip-syncs to "Devil", Daya Betty lip-syncs to "Fighter", Lady Camden lip-syncs to "I Fell Down (I Got Up)" and Willow Pill lip-syncs to "I Hate People". After their performances, RuPaul tells the queens that only two queens will be advancing to the final lip-sync of the season. It is announced that the final two queens are Lady Camden and Willow Pill, meaning Angeria Paris VanMicheals, Bosco and Daya Betty are eliminated. It is then announced that Kornbread "The Snack" Jeté is this season's Miss Congeniality. Lady Camden and Willow Pill lip-sync to "Gimme! Gimme! Gimme! (A Man After Midnight)" by Cher. It is announced that Willow Pill is the winner, leaving Lady Camden as the runner-up.: Finals venue: Flamingo Las Vegas, Las Vegas, Nevada; Final Five: Angeria Paris VanMicheals, Bosco, Daya Betty, Lady Camden and Willow Pill; Eliminated: Angeria Paris VanMicheals, Bosco and Daya Betty; Miss Congeniality: Kornbread "The Snack" Jeté; Final Two: Lady Camden and Willow Pill; Lip-Sync Song: "Gimme! Gimme! Gimme! (A Man After Midnight)" by Cher; Runner-up: Lady Camden; Winner of RuPaul's Drag Race Season Fourteen: Willow Pill

== Ratings ==
Viewership and ratings per episode of RuPaul's Drag Race season 14
No.	Title	Air date	Rating (18–49)	Viewers (millions)
1	"Big Opening #1"	January 7, 2022	0.28	0.738
2	"Big Opening #2"	January 14, 2022	0.23	0.671
3	"A Pair of Balls"	January 21, 2022	0.19	0.580
4	"She's a Super Tease"	January 28, 2022	0.19	0.568
5	"Save a Queen"	February 4, 2022	0.20	0.594
6	"Glamazon Prime"	February 11, 2022	0.18	0.494
7	"Daytona Wind"	February 18, 2022	0.21	0.601
8	"60s Girl Groups"	February 25, 2022	0.21	0.603
9	"Menzeses"	March 4, 2022	0.22	0.596
10	"Snatch Game"	March 11, 2022	0.27	0.725
11	"An Extra Special Episode"	March 18, 2022	0.24	0.658
12	"Moulin Ru: The Rusical"	March 25, 2022	0.18	0.565
13	"The Ross Mathews Roast"	April 1, 2022	0.20	0.572
14	"Catwalk"	April 8, 2022	0.22	0.606
15	"Reunited"	April 15, 2022	0.17	0.492
16	"Grand Finale"	April 22, 2022	0.26	0.697
