= Kornbread Jeté =

American drag queen (born 1992)

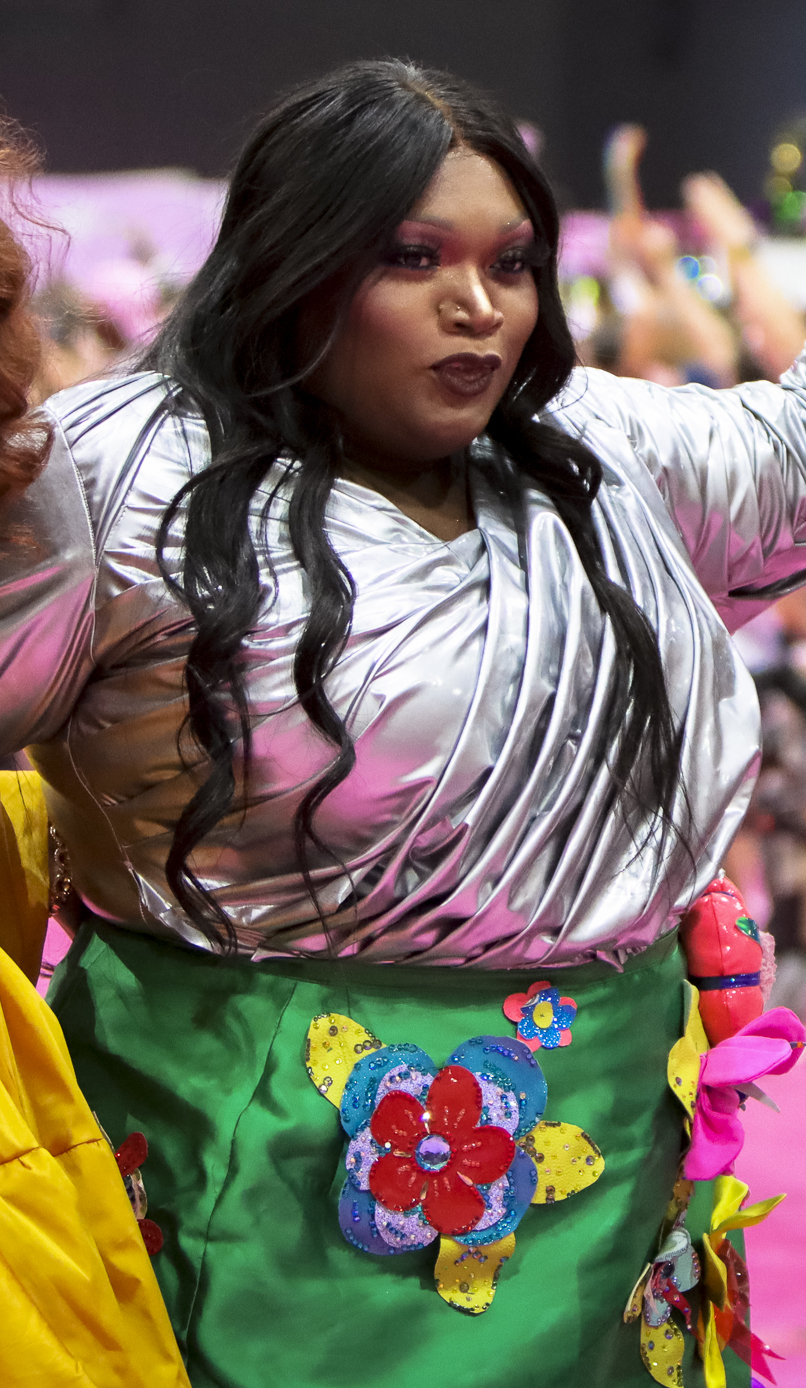
- Kornbread Jeté at RuPaul's DragCon LA, 2022
- Born: January 14, 1992 (age 34); Columbia, South Carolina, U.S.
- Other names: Demoria Elise Williams; Kornbread "The Snack" Jeté; Kornbread
- Education: American Musical and Dramatic Academy
- Occupation: Drag queen
- Television: RuPaul's Drag Race (season 14)

Kornbread Jeté is the stage name of Demoria Elise Williams (born January 14, 1992), an American drag queen best known for competing on season 14 of RuPaul's Drag Race in 2022.

== Early life and education ==
Williams was born and raised in Columbia, South Carolina. She later moved to Los Angeles to study musical theatre at the American Musical and Dramatic Academy (AMDA).

== Career ==
As of 2022, Kornbread works at The Abbey in Los Angeles, and hosts weekly Drag Race watch parties at West Hollywood's Abbey Food & Bar.

In 2022, she competed on season 14 of RuPaul's Drag Race. She performed an original song routine for the opening episode's talent show and won the challenge, which came with a cash prize of $5,000. In her routine, she used a milk carton with former Drag Race judge Merle Ginsberg depicted as a missing person. In the fifth episode, it was announced that Kornbread had to withdraw from the competition after rolling her ankle the week prior, ultimately coming in 11th Place. At the finale, she was announced as Season 14's Miss Congeniality, having been chosen by her fellow contestants, and won a $10,000 cash prize. Kornbread, along with fellow RuPaul's Drag Race alumni Ginger Minj and Kahmora Hall, appeared in the 2022 film Hocus Pocus 2.

She has appeared in videos with Brandon Rogers and Fine Brothers Entertainment, and has been featured in Thrillist.

== Personal life ==
Kornbread is a transgender woman. She is close friends with Kerri Colby, a fellow Drag Race contestant and trans woman. Kornbread has said of Colby, "She's literally walked me through so much of my transition that no one understands how much she's done for me personally. She's not my drag mom, but I tell her she's definitely partly my trans mom."

Kornbread is the drag daughter of Calypso Jeté Balmain who won the first season of Legendary with the House of Balmain. Her "drag sister" is Hershii LiqCour-Jeté, who competed on the sixteenth season of Drag Race.

On September 26, 2022, Kornbread announced via an Instagram post that she had been diagnosed with an early stage adenocarcinoma, a type of intestinal cancer, and used her experience to raise awareness of the disease.

== Filmography ==
=== Film ===
Year	Title	Role	Ref
2022	Hocus Pocus 2	Mary Sanderson impersonator	

=== Television ===
Year	Title	Role	Notes
2019	The Boulet Brothers' Dragula	Herself	Cameo; season 3, episode 1
2021	Wigs in a Blanket	Herself	
2022	RuPaul's Drag Race	Contestant	Season 14, 6 episodes (11th place)
2022	RuPaul's Drag Race: Untucked	Herself	Season 13, 4 episodes
2022	Watch What Happens Live with Andy Cohen	Herself	Guest; season 19, episode 40
2023	RuPaul's Drag Race	Herself	Guest; season 15, 1 episode; named Miss Congeniality

=== Music videos ===
Year	Title	Artist	Ref
2019	"Freedom"	Kameron Michaels	
2021	"Is It Me?"	Scarlet Envy	
2022	"C'mon Baby Cry"	Orville Peck	
2022	"Taste So Good"	Weedmaps x Cann	
2022	"Angle"	Willow Pill	

=== Internet series ===
Year	Title	Role	Notes	Ref.
2019	Spectrum	Herself	Episode: "Do All Drag Queens Think The Same?"	
2019	Blame the Hero	H.B. / Queen's Advisor	Guest role; 3 episodes	
2020	Blood & Makeup	Dr. Linda	Guest role; Episode: "Part3"	
2021	Normal British Series	The Sacred One	Main role	
2022	Whatcha Packin’	Herself	Guest	
2022	Binge Queens	Herself	Guest	
2022	The Awardist	Herself	Guest	
2022	Folx Presents	Herself	Guest	
2022	EW News Flash	Herself	Guest with Ginger Minj and Kahmora Hall	
2022	Out of the Closet	Herself	Guest	
2023	Amigas y Amores	Herself	Guest Starring	
2023	Sissy That Talk Show with Joseph Shepherd	Herself	Podcast; Guest	
2023	The Pit Stop	Herself	Guest	
2023	Bryce	Gloria Goopty	Main role	
2024	Class Acts	Rhoda May	Recurring role	
2024	Give It To Me Straight	Herself	Guest	
2025	Dragged Ink	Herself	Guest	

== Awards and nominations ==
Year	Award-giving body	Category	Work	Results	Ref.
2022	Critics' Choice Real TV Awards	Best Ensemble Cast in an Unscripted Series (Shared with the Season 14 cast)	RuPaul's Drag Race	Won	
2023	Queerty Awards	Closet Door Bustdown (Shared with Bosco, Jasmine Kennedie and Willow Pill)	RuPaul's Drag Race	Runner-up	
2023	Queerty Awards	Future All-Star	Herself	Won	

== See also ==
- List of LGBT African Americans
- List of people from Los Angeles
- List of transgender people
