= Angeria Paris VanMicheals =

American drag performer

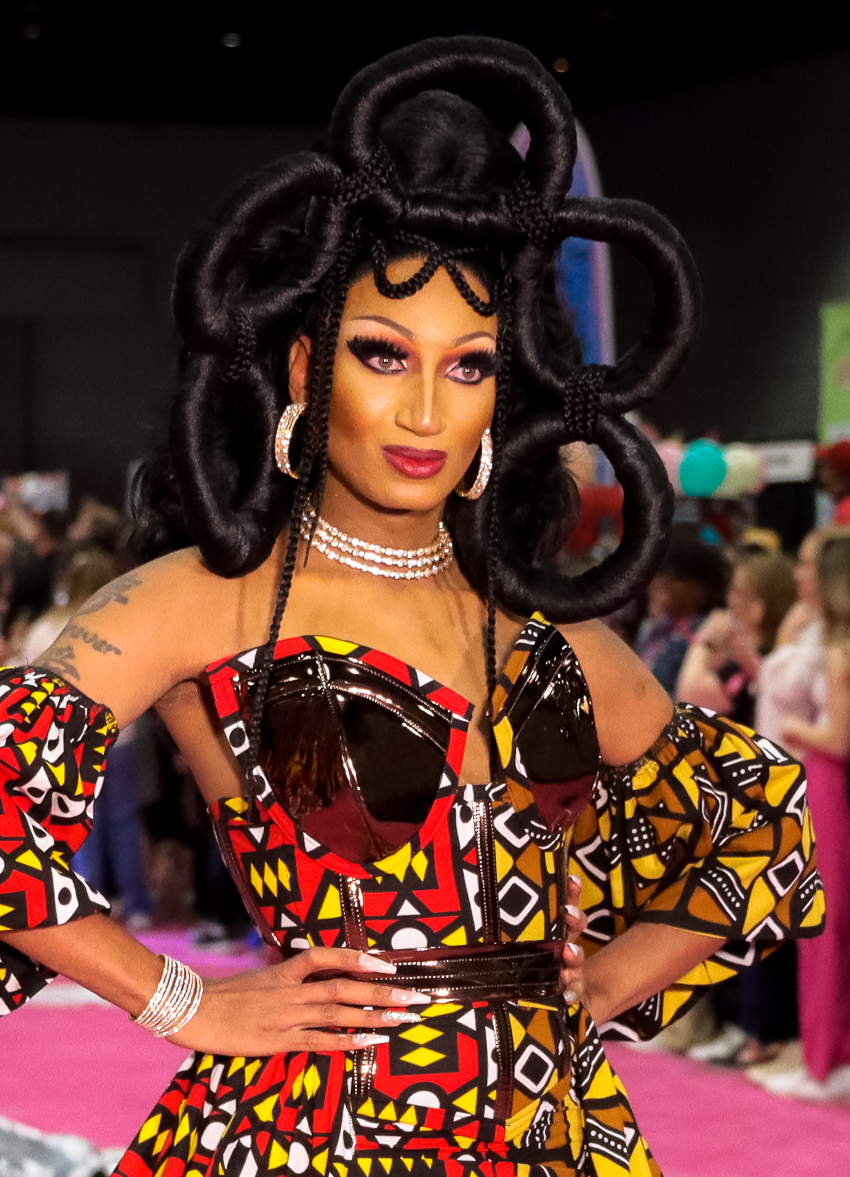
- Angeria Paris VanMicheals at RuPaul's DragCon LA, 2023
- Born: Tommie Laron Holsey; July 25, 1993 (age 33); Sparta, Georgia, U.S.
- Occupation: Drag queen
- Television: RuPaul's Drag Race (season 14); RuPaul's Drag Race All Stars (season 9)

Tommie Laron Holsey (born July 25, 1993), better known by the stage name Angeria Paris VanMicheals, is an American drag performer who competed on the fourteenth season of RuPaul's Drag Race and won the ninth season of RuPaul's Drag Race All Stars.

== Early life ==
Holsey is from Sparta, Georgia. After High School, she moved to Valdosta, where she discovered her love for drag.

== Career ==
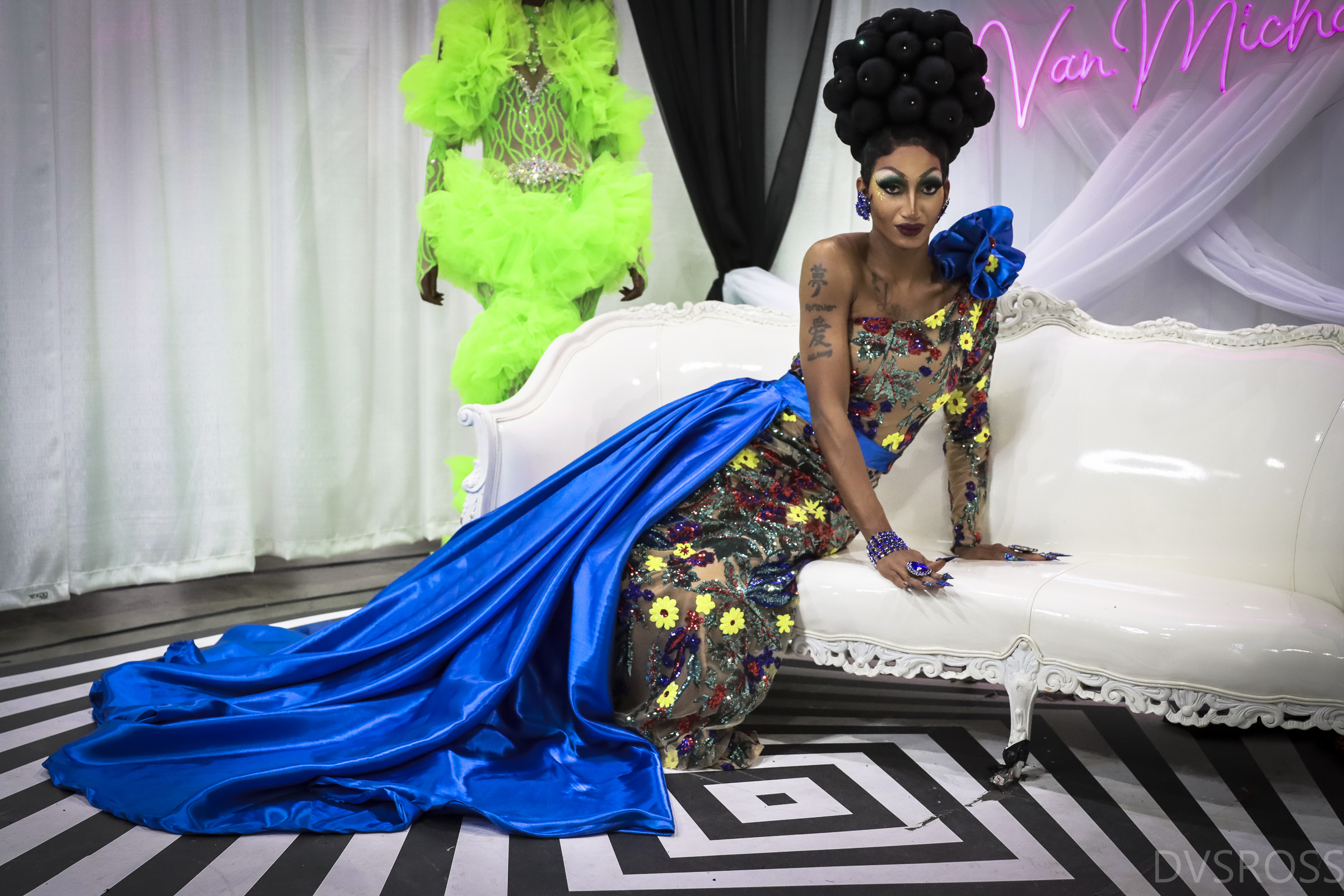
Angeria Paris VanMicheals at RuPaul's DragCon LA, 2022

Angeria Paris VanMicheals is a drag queen who has described her style as "pageant, glamorous, and country". Joseph S. Pete of The Times of Northwest Indiana called her "the epitome of southern charm, high glamour, and Atlanta drag pageantry at its absolute finest".

In 2015, she began competing in drag pageants, eventually being crowned Black America Jr. Miss in 2019.

Angeria Paris VanMicheals competed on the fourteenth season of RuPaul's Drag Race, during which she had a "budding on-screen romance" with fellow contestant Lady Camden. She won two challenges, including one with the runway theme "Night of 1,000 J. Los". Angeria Paris VanMicheals reportedly wrote her talent show song in one day. She impersonated former Drag Race contestant Tammie Brown for the Snatch Game challenge. Screen Rant's Cailyn Szelinski included her impersonation in a list of the show's ten "weirdest" Snatch Game performances. Luke Gardner of The Georgia Voice included her appearance on the show in a list of "10 Events That Impacted LGBTQ Atlanta in 2022".

Angeria Paris VanMicheals released her debut single "Call Me Angie" in June 2022. In 2024, she was announced as one of eight former Drag Race contestants participating in Painting with Raven, a spin-off of the WOW Presents Plus series Painted with Raven.

On April 23, 2024, Angeria Paris VanMicheals was announced as one of the eight contestants competing on the ninth season of RuPaul's Drag Race All Stars. She subsequently won the season.

In 2025, Angeria Paris VanMicheals served as an executive producer for the documentary Cashing Out, focused around the boom of viatical settlements during the AIDS crisis. The documentary was shortlisted for the Academy Award for Best Documentary Short Film, but ultimately did not receive a nomination.

== Personal life ==
Holsey is based in Atlanta, and is openly gay. As of 2024, she resides in Los Angeles.

== Discography ==
=== Singles ===
Title	Year	Album	Ref.
"Call Me Angie" (Feat. Ocean Kelly)	2022	Non-album singles	

=== Featured singles ===
Title	Year	Album	Ref.
"Save a Queen" (with The Cast of RuPaul's Drag Race, Season 14)	2022	Non-album singles	
"My Baby Is Love (The RuPremes)" (with Kerri Colby & Lady Camden)	2022	Non-album singles	
"Moulin Ru! the Rusical!" (with The Cast of RuPaul's Drag Race, Season 14)	2022	Moulin Ru! the Rusical!	
"Catwalk (Cast Version)" (RuPaul ft. The Cast of RuPaul's Drag Race, Season 14)	2022	Non-album singles	
"Check My Track Record"	2022	Non-album singles	

== Filmography ==
=== Film ===
Year	Title	Role
2026	Stop! That! Train! †	Amelia

=== Television ===
Year	Title	Role	Notes	Ref
2022	RuPaul's Drag Race (season 14)	Contestant	3rd place	
2022	RuPaul's Drag Race: Untucked	Contestant	3rd place	
2022	41NBC News	Herself	Guest	
2022	Dynasty	Herself	Episode: "Ben"	
2023	KCAL News	Herself	Guest	
2023	RuPaul's Drag Race All Stars (season 8)	Lip Sync Assassin	Episode: "Joan: The Unauthorized Rusical!"	
2023	RuPaul's Drag Race All Stars: Untucked!	Herself	Episode: "All Stars Untucked - Joan: The Unauthorized Rusical!"	
2024	RuPaul's Drag Race All Stars (season 9)	Contestant	Winner	
2024	RuPaul's Drag Race All Stars: Untucked	Contestant	Winner	

=== Web series ===
Year	Title	Role	Notes	Ref
2021	Meet the Queens	Herself	Stand-alone special RuPaul's Drag Race Season 14	
2022	Whatcha Packin'	Herself	Guest	
2022	Binge Queens	Herself	Guest	
2022	Drag Transformation by Them	Herself	Guest	
2023	göt2b’s Take It to the Runway	Herself	Guest with Eureka O'Hara; 2 episodes	
2023	Bring Back My Girls	Herself	Guest	

=== Music videos ===
Year	Title	Artist	Ref.
2022	"Catwalk"	RuPaul feat. Bosco, Daya Betty, Lady Camden, & Willow Pill	
2022	"Call Me Angie (Check)"	Feat. Ocean Kelly	
2023	"True Colors"	Kylie Sonique Love	
2023	"Bring It On"	Honey Davenport feat. Mariah Paris Balenciaga & Salina EsTitties	

Preceded by Jimbo	Winner of RuPaul's Drag Race All Stars; US All Stars 9	Succeeded by Ginger Minj
