= Willow Pill =

American drag performer

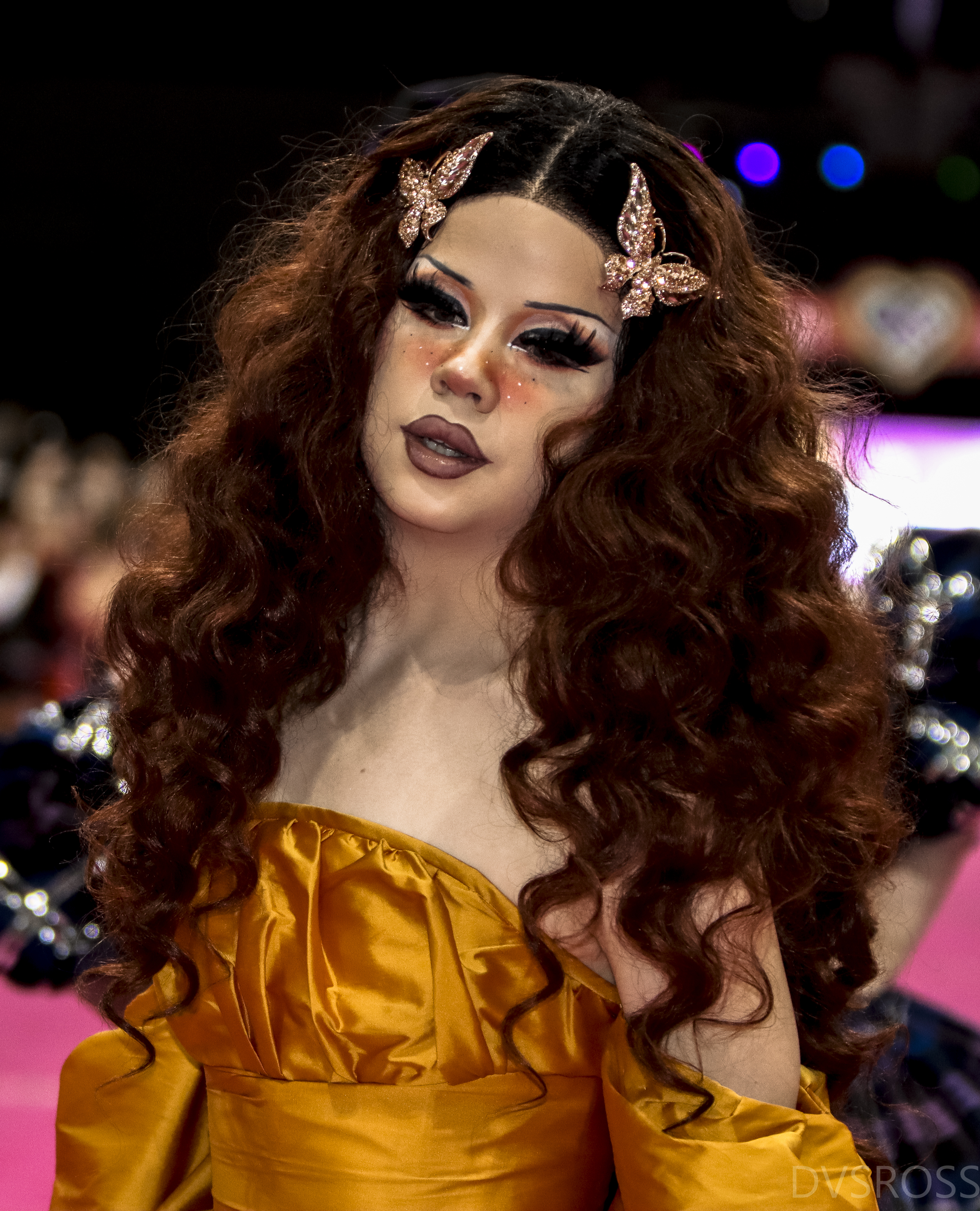
- Willow Pill at RuPaul's DragCon LA, 2022
- Born: January 22, 1995 (age 31); Denver, Colorado, U.S.
- Other name: Willow Patterson
- Education: Colorado State University
- Occupation: Drag queen
- Television: RuPaul's Drag Race

Willow Patterson (born January 22, 1995), known by the stage name Willow Pill, is an American drag performer, recording artist, and television personality. She is best known for winning the fourteenth season of RuPaul's Drag Race in 2022, where she became the third contestant with a chronic illness to win a regular season of the show. Willow Pill’s victory was widely seen as a milestone for transgender representation on Drag Race, a show that had previously faced criticism for its treatment of trans contestants. During her time on the show, she came out as trans femme and spoke candidly about her experience living with cystinosis, a rare genetic disorder she has managed since childhood. She uses she/they pronouns and has said her drag is often shaped by themes of illness, mortality, and gender exploration.

== Early life ==
Patterson was raised in Denver, Colorado and attended Arapahoe High School in Littleton Public Schools. Patterson later attended Colorado State University.

== Career ==
=== Early career ===
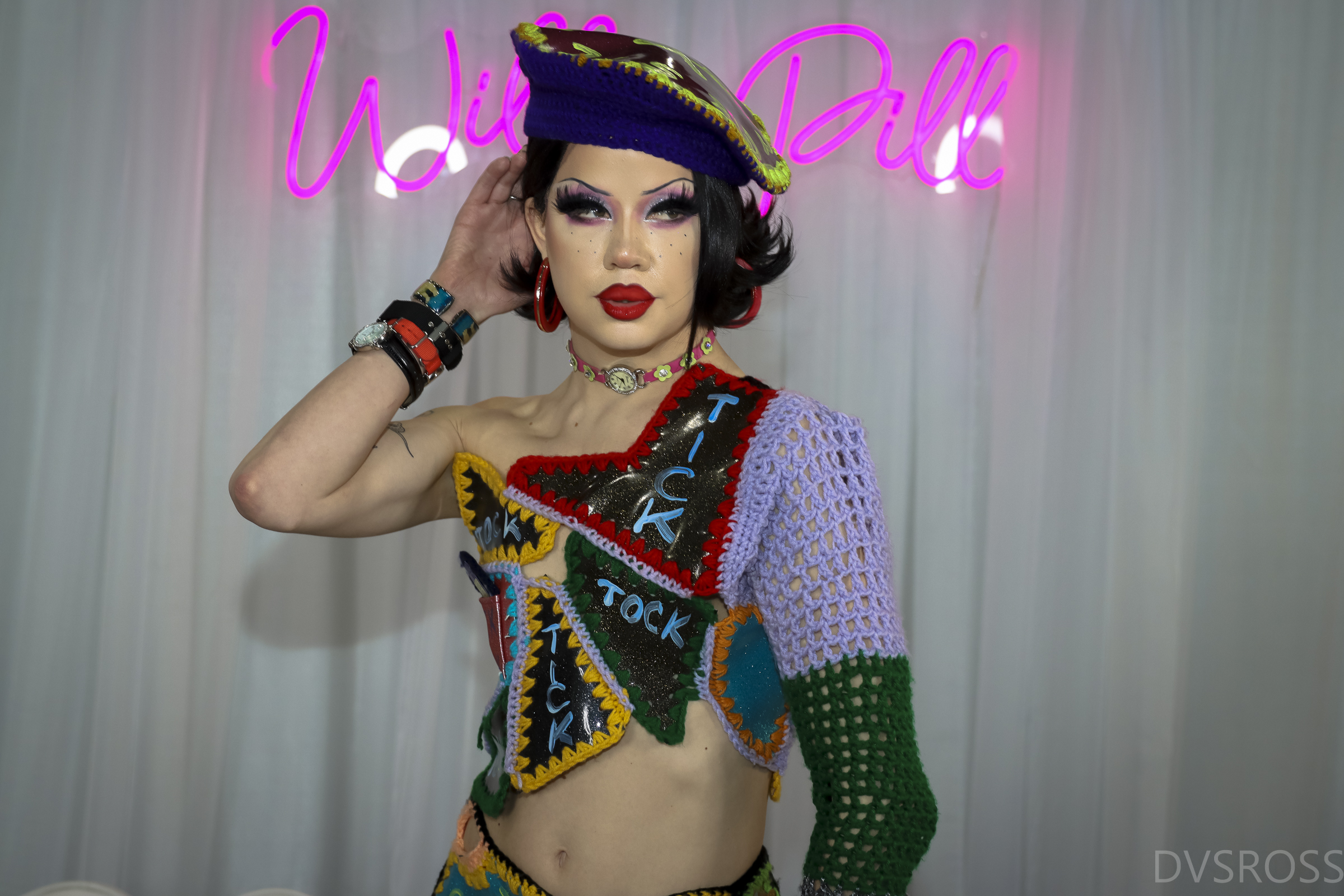
Willow Pill at RuPaul's DragCon LA, 2022

While attending Colorado State University, Patterson began performing drag in 2016 at the age of 21 after following RuPaul's Drag Race since the age of 14. Patterson has said that she first became interested in drag after seeing season one contestant Tammie Brown and was immediately hooked by the series. Patterson later credited Raja, Jinkx Monsoon, and Adore Delano with inspiring a more serious interest in drag.

Patterson's first drag performance took place at a Colorado State University drag show, where Willow Pill appeared in "a pink '90s housewife tracksuit, complete with glasses and a pearl necklace". The performance combined comedy with dance to music by rapper Missy Elliott and singer Gwen Stefani. Patterson later developed hosting and comedic skills while performing at the now-closed Gladys nightclub in Denver and also performed at Denver's Tracks Nightclub, which Patterson has described as an important venue in her drag career.

Before being cast on the fourteenth season of RuPaul's Drag Race in 2022, Patterson auditioned for the series three times. Patterson later said that competing on the show marked a return to drag after more than a year away from regular performances, having appeared only occasionally during the early months of the COVID-19 pandemic in 2020.

=== RuPaul's Drag Race ===
In 2022, Willow Pill gained wider prominence as a contestant on season 14 of RuPaul's Drag Race. During the first episode of Season 14, she performed a surreal self-care-themed talent number set to Enya’s “Only Time,” which involved a bathtub, spaghetti, and a toaster oven. The routine was inspired by a video she had made in high school and became one of her most memorable performances. She won the main challenge on the third episode, earning a cash prize of $5,000. Her Snatch Game performance as Drew Barrymore in episode 10 placed her in the bottom seven, and she participated in the lip-sync tournament on episode eleven. She won the first round against Bosco. She placed in the bottom a second time during episode 14, and was required to "lip sync for her life" against Angeria Paris VanMicheals. Following their performance of "Telephone" by Lady Gaga ft. Beyoncé, neither was eliminated, resulting in five contestants advancing to the finale, a first for the series.

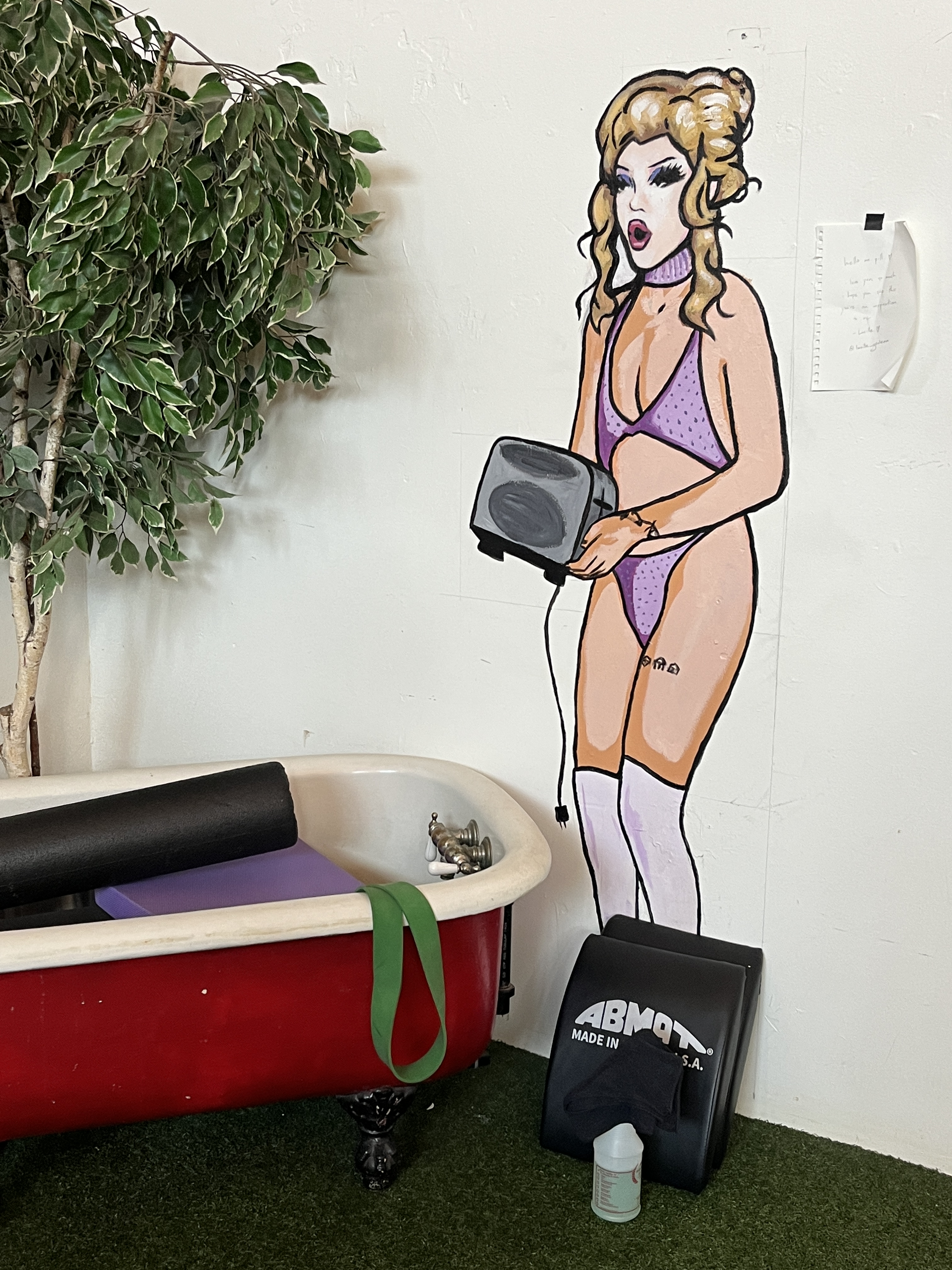
Art depicting Willow Pill at a gym in Seattle, 2023

In the season finale, Willow Pill was announced the winner of Season 14 of RuPaul’s Drag Race, receiving the top prize of $150,000, which, at the time, was the highest amount awarded in a regular season. The season finale, filmed at the Flamingo Hotel in Las Vegas, marked the show’s return to an in-person event following two pandemic-affected seasons. Each finalist performed an original solo number rather than competing in traditional lip-sync battles. Willow Pill performed "I Hate People" and was selected as the top two alongside Lady Camden to face off in a final lip-sync. In their lip-sync battle to Cher's version of ABBA's "Gimme! Gimme! Gimme! (A Man After Midnight)," Willow Pill defeated Lady Camden and ultimately won the crown. Although the finale was filmed in advance, Willow Pill did not learn the outcome until it aired on April 22, 2022. She made history as the first openly transgender woman to win a regular season of the show in the United States, and is the sixth openly transgender contestant to win a season of the Drag Race franchise at the time of her crowning. (Note: The other transgender contestants to win a Drag Race season were Angele Anang, Kylie Sonique Love, Vanessa Van Cartier, and Sasha Colby, as well as Jinkx Monsoon and Trinity the Tuck, the winners of RuPaul's Drag Race (season 5) and fourth season of All Stars respectively, who came out as trans non-binary following their season victories.)

Willow Pill’s win came at a time when RuPaul’s Drag Race was undergoing increased scrutiny and change regarding its inclusion of transgender contestants. In earlier seasons, the show used terms now widely considered transphobic, such as “she-mail,” and host RuPaul previously stated he would not allow trans women to compete. Willow Pill’s visibility as a trans femme winner was seen as a milestone in the franchise’s evolving stance on gender identity and inclusion. Season 14 was also notable for its emphasis on transparency around gender identity, coming-out stories, and chronic illness. For the first time in franchise history, five queens made it to the finale.

Willow Pill's original finale song, “I Hate People,” co-written with Leland and Gabe Lopez, was Emmy-eligible which is a rarity for reality show contestants. She described the song as a satirical response to frustrations with society and government during the pandemic. Following her win, she released a single titled “Angle” along with an accompanying music video. She also collaborated with Yvie Oddly on the track “Sick B*tch” from Oddly’s debut album Drag Trap, released in 2020.

== Artistry ==
Patterson developed the Willow Pill character while performing in Denver's drag scene. Willow Pill's artistic style combines comedy, vintage fashion, and recurring themes of illness, death, and gender identity. Patterson has described Willow Pill as "a mix of 41 and 14", drawing inspiration from older women, "little stoner girls", and everyday life.

Willow Pill's artistic style draws on retro glamour, dreams, and vintage photographs of Patterson's mother from the 1960s, 1970s, and 1990s. During the fourteenth season of RuPaul's Drag Race, Patterson's runway looks included a "house" look based on a dream about a doll growing too large for its toy home, and a thong dress inspired by a dream about diving into a rack of swimsuits at a Tommy Bahama store. Patterson has credited Tammie Brown, Raja, Jinkx Monsoon, and Adore Delano as influences on Willow Pill's approach to drag.

Patterson has said that living with cystinosis since childhood has shaped both personal identity and artistic practice. Willow Pill incorporates experiences of illness, death, and darkness into performances and visual style, while also exploring gender identity.

== Public advocacy ==
Patterson has used a public platform to discuss living with cystinosis, a rare inherited genetic disorder that has affected her since childhood. During the fourteenth season of RuPaul's Drag Race in 2022, Patterson spoke openly about the condition, explaining that she takes more than 20 medications each day to manage it and describing its effects on daily life, gender identity, and drag. In interviews following the season, Patterson said that appearing on the series provided an opportunity to speak openly about chronic illness on a national platform and increase representation for people living with similar conditions.

Patterson has also spoken publicly about gender identity and transition. During the broadcast of RuPaul's Drag Race, Patterson came out as transfeminine and later discussed how years of medical treatment, including a kidney transplant at age 15, had delayed gender transition because of the physical and emotional effects of chronic illness. Patterson has said that being open about both experiences could help transgender people and people living with chronic illnesses who rarely see themselves represented in popular media. Patterson has also said that chronic illness shaped not only a performance style but also the decision to discuss personal health on such a large public platform.

== Personal life ==
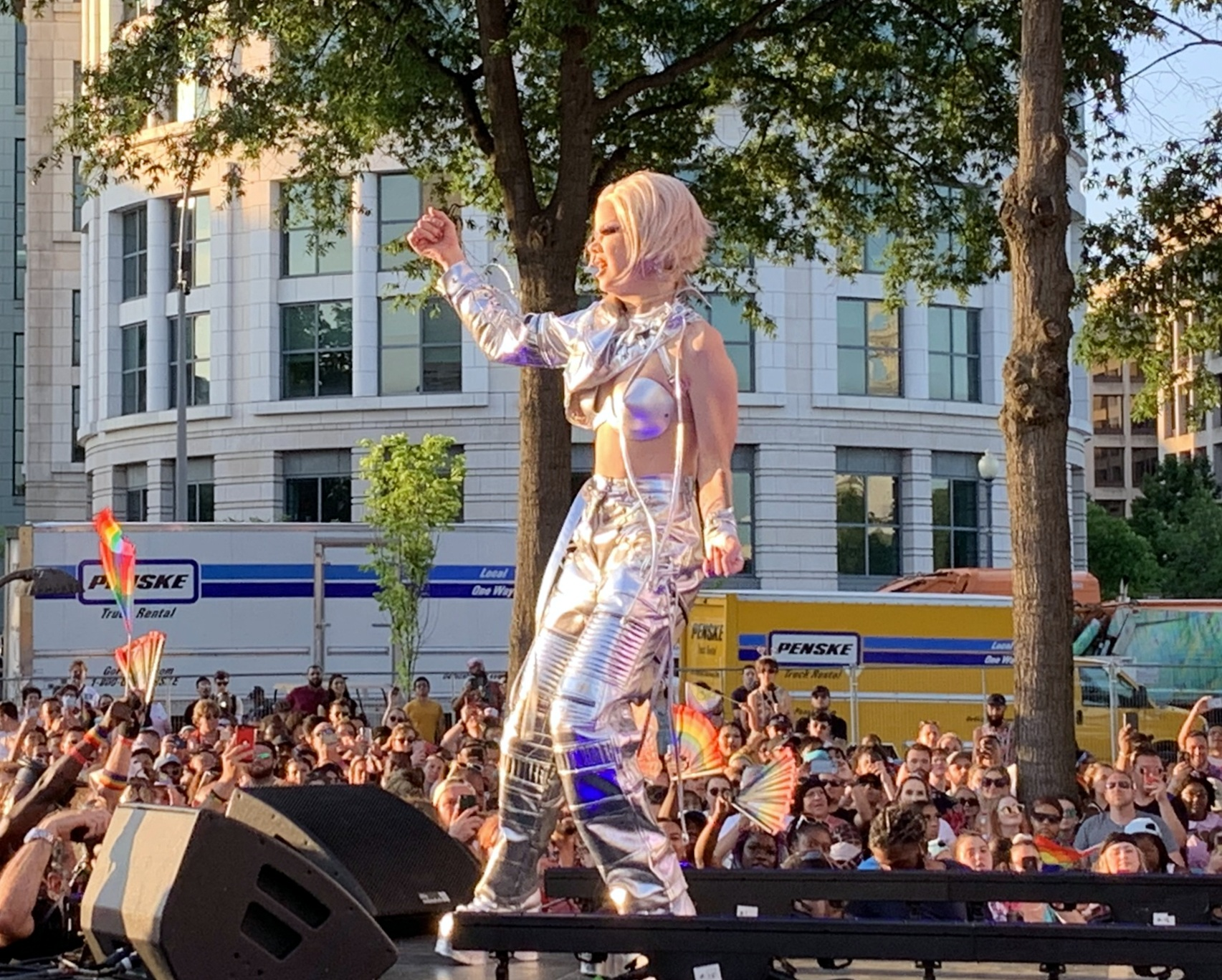
Willow Pill performing in 2022

Willow Pill was born and raised in Denver, Colorado, where she lived until the age of 26 before relocating to Chicago. She is transfeminine and uses they/them and she/her pronouns, making her one of the five transgender contestants of Season 14. Willow Pill initially opened up about her gender identity in an episode of Untucked! and later came out as transgender via social media during the airing of the season. She and two of her cast-mates, Bosco and Jasmine Kennedie, came out as transgender over the progression of the season, making S14 the season with the most openly trans contestants including Kornbread Jeté and Kerri Colby, who had openly been out prior to the airing of the season.

When Willow Pill publicly came out as transfeminine during Season 14, she shared more details in an Instagram post, where she explained that chronic illness had delayed her gender journey. She described how her medical condition, cystinosis, caused both physical and emotional pain that complicated her relationship with her body. Willow Pill wrote that her kidney transplant at age 15 and the ongoing effects of muscle atrophy, PTSD from medical experiences, and a high medication load made the process of transitioning more complex. Despite these challenges, she began medically transitioning, including undergoing facial feminization surgery in November 2021.

Willow Pill has spoken about her connection with fellow Denver drag queen and Drag Race Season 11 winner Yvie Oddly, calling her an early inspiration and collaborator. They first met at a student drag show and reconnected through a college documentary project Willow Pill created about Yvie Oddly. She noted that they have supported one another in shaping a personal relationship to drag that differs from traditional expressions of the art form.

After winning Drag Race, Willow Pill stated that she intended to put part of her prize money into a college fund for her future children and keep the rest in savings with the goal of retiring early, ideally by age 35.

== Filmography ==
=== Television ===
Year	Title	Role	Place	Ref
2022	RuPaul's Drag Race (season 14)	Contestant	Winner	
2022	RuPaul's Drag Race: Untucked	Contestant	Winner	
2023	RuPaul's Drag Race (season 15)	Herself	Guest	

=== Web series ===
Year	Title	Role	Notes	Ref
2021	Meet the Queens	Herself	Stand-alone special RuPaul's Drag Race Season 14	
2022	Whatcha Packin'	Herself	Guest	
2022	The Awardist	Herself	Guest	
2022	The Pit Stop	Herself	Guest	
2022	Folx Presents	Herself	Guest	
2022	Meet the Queens	Herself	Host; RuPaul's Drag Race Season 15	
2023	Sloppy Seconds'	Herself	Guest	
2023	Give It to Me Straight'	Herself	Guest	
2023	Fashion Photo RuView	Herself	Guest	

=== Music videos ===
Year	Title	Artist	Ref
2021	"Sick Bitch"	Yvie Oddly feat. Willow Pill	
2022	"Taste So Good (The Cann Song)"	Vincint, Hayley Kiyoko, MNEK and Kesha (Weedmaps x Cann)	
2022	"Angle"	Willow Pill feat. Kornbread Jeté	

== Awards and nominations ==
Year	Award-giving body	Category	Work	Results	Ref.
2022	MTV Movie & TV Awards	Best Reality Star	RuPaul's Drag Race	Nominated	
2022	Critics' Choice Real TV Awards	Best Ensemble Cast in an Unscripted Series (Shared with the Season 14 cast)	RuPaul's Drag Race	Won	
2022	People's Choice Awards	The Competition Contestant of 2022	RuPaul's Drag Race	Nominated	
2023	Queerty Awards	Closet Door Bustdown (Shared with Bosco, Jasmine Kennedie and Kornbread Jeté)	RuPaul's Drag Race	Runner-up	
2023	Queerty Awards	Drag Royalty	Herself	Nominated	

== Notes ==
Awards and achievements
Preceded by Symone	Winner of RuPaul's Drag Race; US season 14	Succeeded by Sasha Colby
