= Lady Camden =

British drag performer

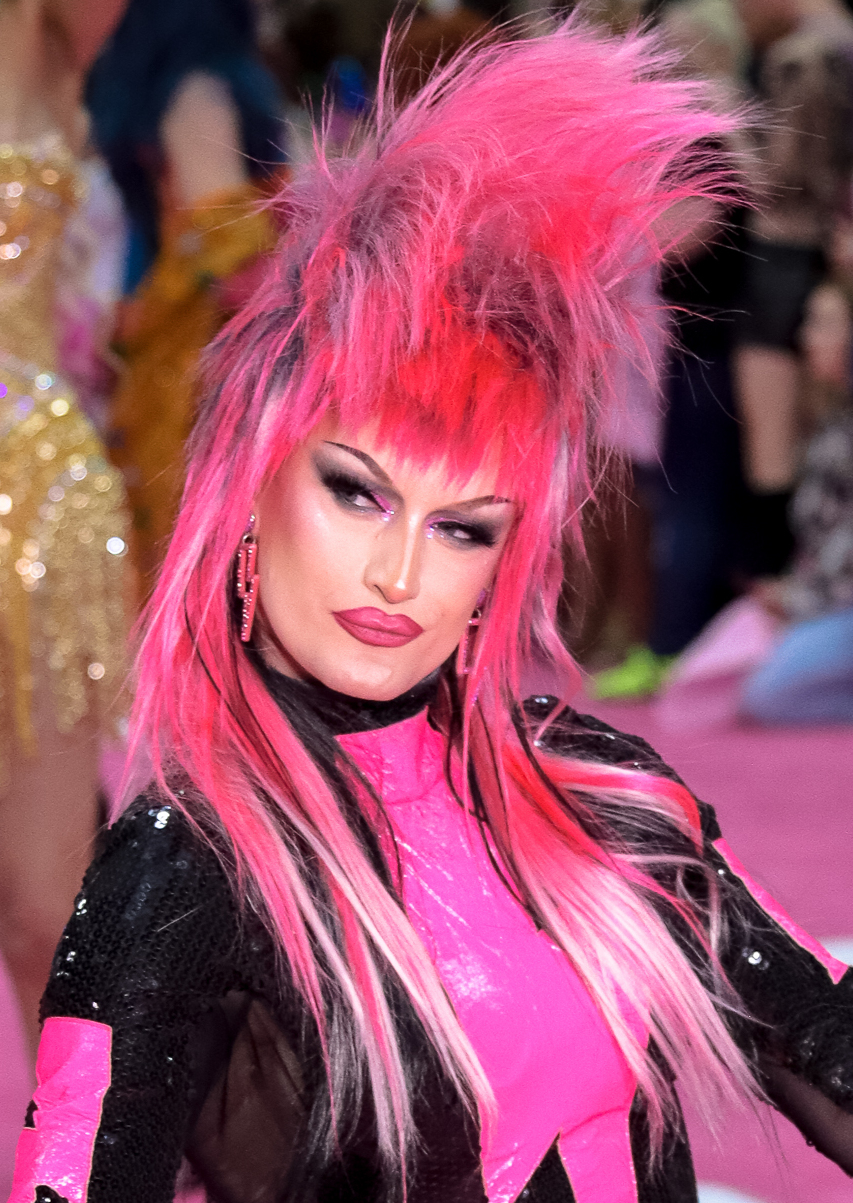
- Lady Camden at RuPaul's DragCon LA, 2023
- Born: Rex Wheeler; 9 August 1990 (age 36); Camden Town, London, England
- Occupation: Drag queen
- Television: RuPaul's Drag Race (season 14)
- Website: ladycamden.com

Rex Wheeler (born 9 August 1990), known by the stage name Lady Camden, is a British drag queen based in the United States who competed on season 14 of RuPaul's Drag Race, placing as the runner-up.

== Early life ==
Wheeler was born in Camden Town, London, England to Brian Wheeler and Jeanne Pacella, who met at Brian's job at the Electric Ballroom. His mother has been described as supportive of Wheeler's drag career, as she has attended many of his performances and even partied alongside the cast of the fourteenth season of Drag Race after the airing of the finale. Wheeler attended the Acland Burghley School and the Royal Ballet School.

== Career ==
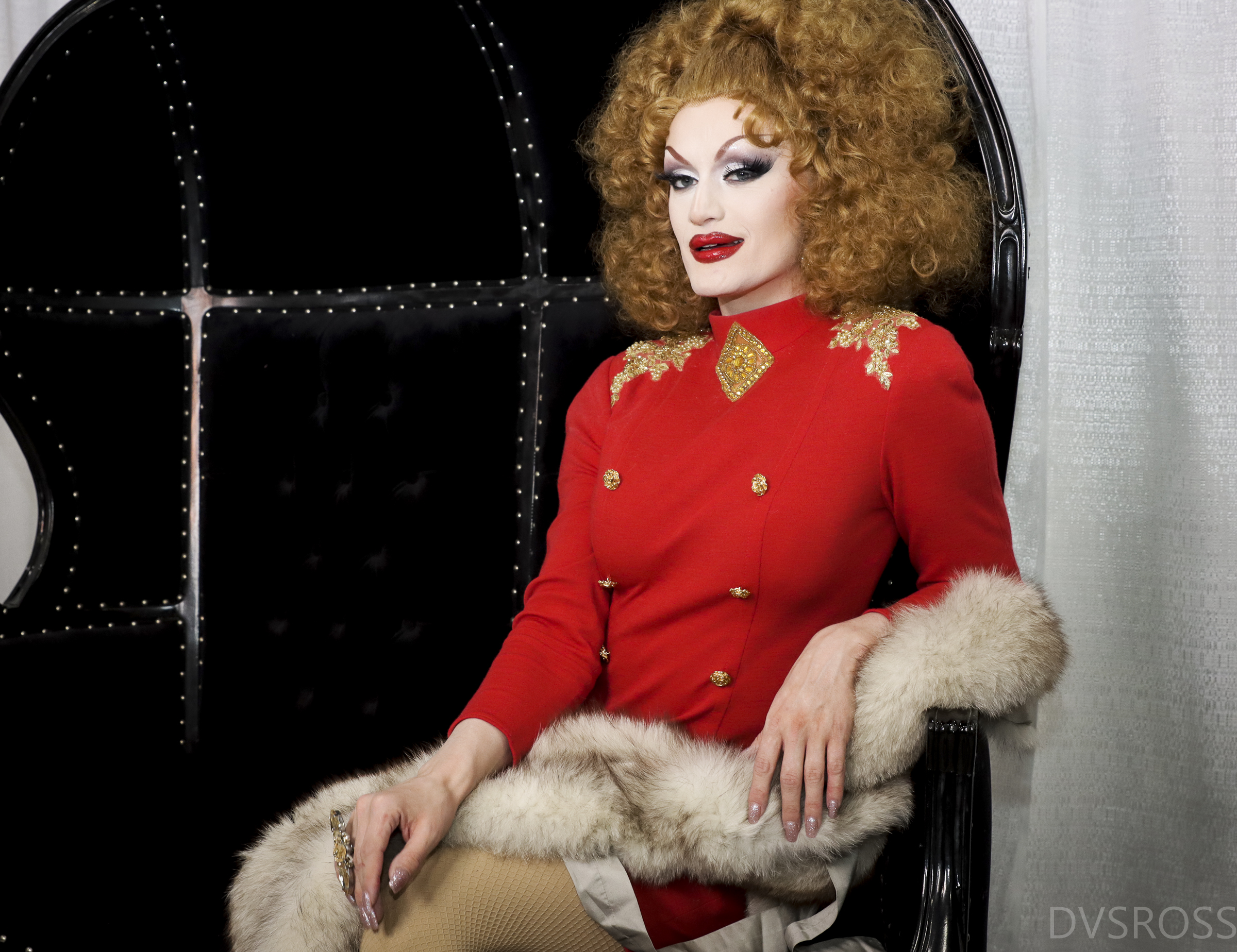
Lady Camden at RuPaul's DragCon LA, 2022

After dancing with the Slovak National Ballet, Wheeler danced with Sacramento Ballet from 2010 to 2015. He then danced and choreographed for Smuin Ballet, based in San Francisco, from 2015 to 2018. In 2019, he premiered Take Five, a piece he choreographed for Smuin Ballet set to the music of Dave Brubeck.

In 2022, Wheeler competed on season 14 of RuPaul's Drag Race as Lady Camden. She won episodes 7, 12, and 14, as well as three cash prizes of $5,000. She landed in the bottom 7 on the Snatch Game episode, and had to participate in a lip-sync tournament, winning the second round against Bosco.

In the finale, she reached the final two with Willow Pill and the two queens participated in a lip-sync battle to Cher's cover version of ABBA's "Gimme! Gimme! Gimme! (A Man After Midnight)". She lost the lip-sync and finished as the runner-up, winning a cash prize of $50,000.

The 2024 docu-fiction film Lady Like, written and directed by Luke Willis, follows Wheeler’s journey on Drag Race while examining childhood trauma and his attempts to heal his inner child.

== Personal life ==
Wheeler lives in California and is gay. During the COVID-19 pandemic, he moved to Sacramento, before returning to San Francisco.

== Filmography ==
=== Television ===
Year	Title	Role	Notes	Ref
2022	RuPaul's Drag Race	Contestant	Season 14; Runner-up	
2022	RuPaul's Drag Race: Untucked	Contestant	Season 14; Runner-up	
2023	RuPaul's Drag Race UK	Herself	Series 5; Special guest	

=== Film ===
Year	Title	Role	Notes	Ref
2024	Lady Like	Self	Feature length docu-fiction	
2026	Loves Company	Tyler	Feature film debut	

=== Web series ===
Year	Title	Role	Notes	Ref
2022	Whatcha Packin'	Herself	Guest	
2022	Drag Us Weekly	Herself	Guest	
2023	Give It to Me Straight	Herself	Guest	
2023	Bring Back My Girls	Self	Guest	

== Awards and nominations ==
Year	Award-giving body	Category	Work	Results	Ref.
2022	MTV Movie & TV Awards	Best Fight (Shared with Bosco)	RuPaul's Drag Race	Won	
2022	Critics' Choice Real TV Awards	Best Ensemble Cast in an Unscripted Series (Shared with the Season 14 cast)	RuPaul's Drag Race	Won	
