= Bosco (drag queen) =

American drag performer

- Bosco for RuPaul's Drag Race All Stars, 2025
- Born: June 11, 1993 (age 33); Great Falls, Montana, U.S.
- Other name: Blair Constantino
- Television: RuPaul's Drag Race (season 14) and RuPaul's Drag Race All Stars (season 10)
- Website: hereisbosco.com

Blair Constantino (born June 11, 1993), known by the stage name Bosco, is an American drag performer who competed on season 14 of RuPaul's Drag Race in 2022 and season 10 of RuPaul's Drag Race All Stars in 2025.

== Early life ==
Bosco was raised in Great Falls, Montana. She was raised Catholic. She (Note: Constantino uses she/her and they/them pronouns. She/her will be used in this article for consistency.) received formal dance training at a young age. Bosco was profiled in the Tribune after being awarded the q Senior Boy Titlist, ranked at the national competition in Las Vegas in 2010.

== Career ==
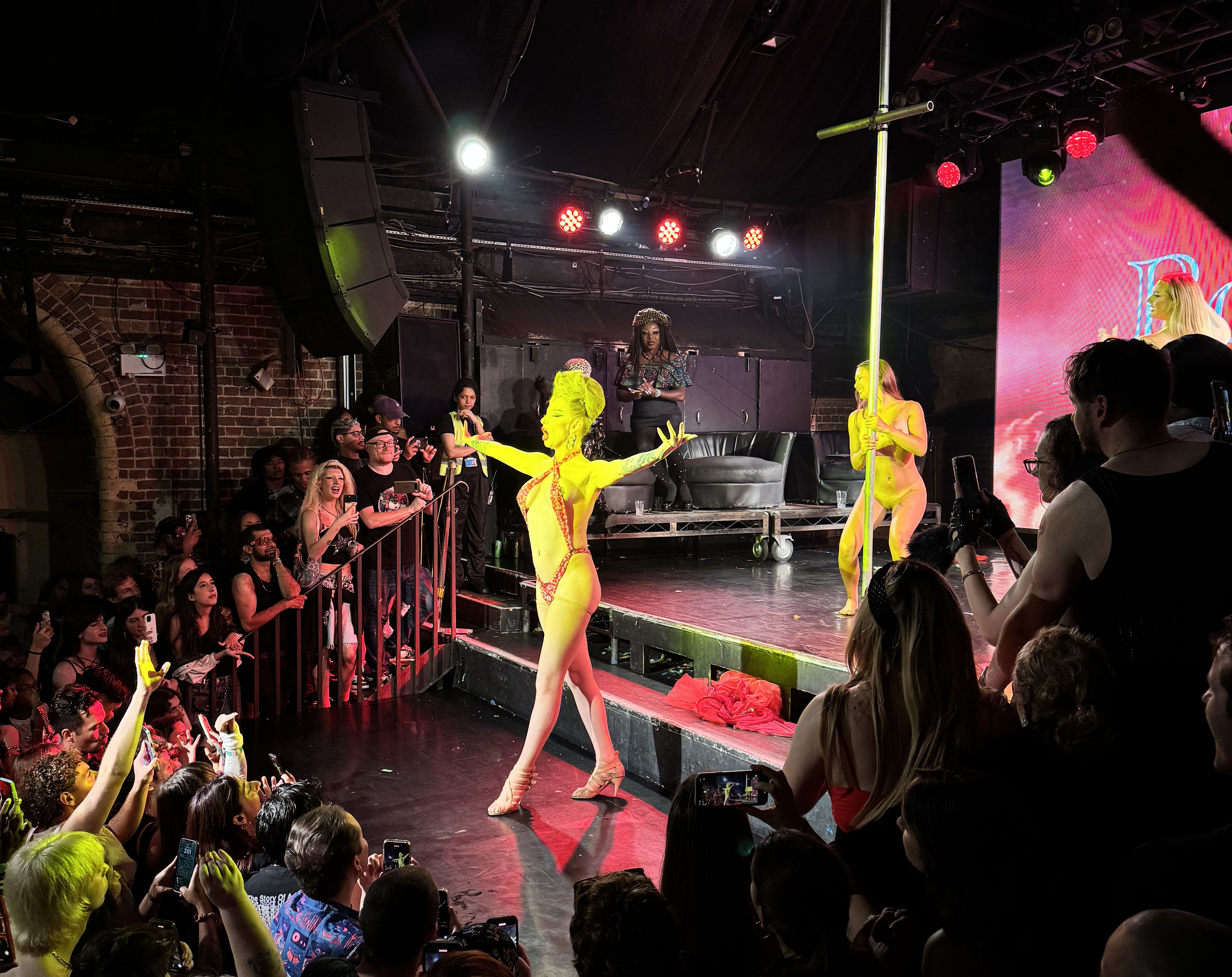
Bosco performing at Heaven on July 24, 2025

The name "Bosco" is taken from her deceased dog as a tribute to him, jokingly stating that "He's not using it anymore, he's dead, so now it's mine".

In 2022, Bosco competed on season 14 of RuPaul's Drag Race. She performed a burlesque routine for the opening episode's talent show. In the fifth, ninth, and thirteenth episodes of the season, she won the main challenges, winning three cash prizes of US$5,000. For Snatch Game, Bosco portrayed Gwyneth Paltrow but landed in the bottom seven, and thus participated in a lip-sync tournament which took place the following episode. She lost two lip syncs, one against Willow Pill to "Never Too Much" by Luther Vandross and one against Lady Camden to "Don't Let Go (Love)" by En Vogue. In the final lip sync, Bosco went up against Jasmine Kennedie to "Swept Away" by Diana Ross, and won.

In episode 12, Bosco landed in the bottom two alongside Jorgeous and had to lip sync to "Heartbreak Hotel (Hex Hector Remix)" by Whitney Houston. She lost the lip sync but was saved after she received the Gold Bar (a twist introduced in the third episode where each queen was assigned a chocolate bar and whoever had a bar which contained a golden ticket wrapped inside would be saved from elimination). This allowed Bosco to stay in the competition. In the subsequent episode, Bosco won the main challenge, which was a roast of Ross Mathews. She ended up placing third in the finale. She appears in RuPaul's Drag Race Live Untucked.

On April 23, 2025, Bosco was announced as one of eighteen former Drag Race contestants participating in the tenth season of RuPaul's Drag Race All Stars. Bosco competed in the season's first bracket and advanced to the semifinals, having earned six points and won two challenges. She advanced to the finale after winning the talent show in the penultimate episode. She ultimately placed third a second time after winning a lipsync against Daya Betty and losing to Ginger Minj, the season's eventual winner.

== Personal life ==
Bosco uses "she" and "they" pronouns out of drag and "she" in drag. Bosco came out as a transgender woman in February 2022, having begun her transition after filming Drag Race. In 2023, she underwent facial feminization surgery and debuted her new look while walking in New York Fashion Week. Her surgery and recovery were documented in the short film Face of Bosco from the RuPaul's Drag Race: Portrait of a Queen series produced for Pride by MTV.

Bosco is the drag sister of Rupaul's Drag Race Season 15's Irene The Alien and Rupaul's Drag Race Season 18's Jane Don't. Bosco has lived in Seattle since 2015. She has two cats named Toby and Tito. Bosco is an avid gamer and fan of Magic: The Gathering. In March 2026, she and her drag sister Irene The Alien launched a Magic: The Gathering web show called Spell Slayers, which features prominent MTG figures and drag personalities, including Wizards of the Coast designer Gavin Verhey.

== Filmography ==
| Year | Title | Genre | Role | Notes | Ref |
|---|---|---|---|---|---|
| 2022 | RuPaul's Drag Race (season 14) | TV | Contestant | 3rd place (15 episodes) | |
| 2022 | RuPaul's Drag Race: Untucked (season 14) | TV | Herself | (13 episodes) | |
| 2024–present | RuPaul's Drag Race Live Untucked | Web series | Main cast | Season 1–present | |
| 2025 | RuPaul's Drag Race All Stars (season 10) | TV | Contestant | 3rd place (6 episodes) | |

== Awards and nominations ==
| Year | Award | Category | Work | Result | Ref. |
|---|---|---|---|---|---|
| 2022 | MTV Movie & TV Awards | Best Fight (Shared with Lady Camden) | RuPaul's Drag Race | Won | |
| 2022 | Critics' Choice Real TV Awards | Best Ensemble Cast in an Unscripted Series | RuPaul's Drag Race | Won | |
| 2022 | People's Choice Awards | The Competition Contestant of 2022 | RuPaul's Drag Race | Nominated | |
| 2023 | Queerty Awards | Closet Door Bustdown (Shared with Jasmine Kennedie, Kornbread Jeté and Willow Pill) | RuPaul's Drag Race | Runner-up | |
| 2024 | Queerty Awards | Future All-Star | Herself | Nominated | |
| 2026 | Queerty Awards | Drag Royalty | Herself | Won | |

== See also ==
- LGBTQ culture in Seattle
- List of LGBTQ people from Seattle
