= Drag Me to the Movies =

American television series

- Genre: Comedy
- Country of origin: United States
- Original language: English
- No. of seasons: 1
- No. of episodes: 8

Production
- Running time: 11–13 minutes
- Production company: World of Wonder

Original release
- Network: WOW Presents Plus
- Release: May 15 – July 3, 2024

Drag Me to the Movies is a streaming television series by World of Wonder, which premiered on May 15, 2024, on WOW Presents Plus.

The series stars Drag Race alumni Crystal Methyd, Daya Betty, Ginger Minj, Jaymes Mansfield, Jimbo, Jujubee, Kelly Mantle, Mayhem Miller, and Shea Couleé in several comedic parodies of popular movies. The first season, which consist of 8 episodes, features parodies of A Star is Born (2018), The Devil Wears Prada (2006), Knives Out (2019), Scream (1996), The Silence of the Lambs (1991), Sense and Sensibility (1995), Showgirls (1995), The Spider-Man movies, Top Gun (1986), The Wizard of Oz (1939) and The Real Housewives.

== Episodes ==
No.	Title	Original release date
1	"A Star Is Spawned"	May 15, 2024
Featuring Queens: Ginger Minj and Jujubee
2	"Yelling Loudly"	May 22, 2024
Featuring Queens: Crystal Methyd and Kelly Mantle
3	"The Silence of the Prada"	May 29, 2024
Featuring Queens: Jimbo and Shea Couleé
4	"The Wizard of Charisma, Uniqueness Nerve & Talent"	June 5, 2024
Featuring Queens: Daya Betty, Jaymes Mansfield and Mayhem Miller
5	"Vers Btm Gun"	June 12, 2024
Featuring Queens: Ginger Minj and Jujubee
6	"The Real Housewives of the Red Onion"	June 19, 2024
Featuring Queens: Crystal Methyd and Kelly Mantle
7	"Spider-Lady of the Evening"	June 26, 2024
Featuring Queens: Jimbo and Shea Couleé
8	"Showgirls and Sensibility"	July 3, 2024
Featuring Queens: Daya Betty, Jaymes Mansfield and Mayhem Miller
