= List of Missouri State University alumni =

This is a list of notable alumni of Missouri State University. Most of these students attended under the former names of the school: Fourth District Normal School (1905–1919), Southwest Missouri State Teacher's College (1919–1972), and Southwest Missouri State University (1972–2005).

== Athletes ==
- Blake Ahearn, current NBA G-League head coach, former NBA D-League player, played in 15 NBA games
- David Arkin, former NFL player
- Scott Bailes, former MLB player
- Mark Bailey, former MLB player
- Drake Baldwin, current MLB player
- Buddy Baumann, former MLB player
- Jake Burger, current MLB player
- Scott Carroll, former MLB player
- Dylan Cole, former NFL player
- Keandre Cook (born 1997), basketball player for Hapoel Tel Aviv in the Israeli Basketball Premier League
- Zak Cummings, professional mixed martial artist for the Ultimate Fighting Championship
- Ross Detwiler, former MLB player
- Winston Garland, former NBA player
- Matt Hall, former MLB player
- Clay Harbor, former NFL player and The Bachelorette contestant
- Jason Hart, former MLB player
- Kyle Hiebert, current MLS player
- Ryan Howard, former MLB player
- Alize Johnson, current NBA player
- Pierce Johnson, current MLB player
- Mike Kickham, former MLB player
- Jerry Lumpe, former MLB player
- Shaun Marcum, former MLB player
- Bill Mueller, former MLB player
- Matt Palmer, former MLB player
- Lance Parker, former MLS player
- Curtis Perry, former NBA player
- Matt Pickens, former MLS player
- John Rheinecker, former MLB player
- Norm Siebern, former MLB player
- Brett Sinkbeil, former MLB player
- Horton Smith, first Masters Tournament winner
- Brad St. Louis, former NFL player
- Jackie Stiles, former WNBA player, NCAA all-time leading scorer
- Jamal Sutton, former MLS player
- Luke Voit, current MLB player
- Jason Whittle, former NFL player
- Brad Ziegler, former MLB player

== Business people ==
- David Glass, former Wal-Mart CEO, former Kansas City Royals owner

== Entertainers ==
- Jim Bohannon, radio talk show host, Westwood One
- Kevin Brockmeier, author
- Don S. Davis, actor
- John Goodman, actor
- Tess Harper, actor
- Caleb Hearon, comedian, actor, writer
- Kendra Kassebaum, Broadway actor, singer
- Lori Lewis, soprano, lead vocalist of symphonic metal band Therion
- Kyle Dean Massey, actor
- Crystal Methyd, drag queen and runner-up of RuPaul's Drag Race (season 12)
- Daya Betty, drag queen and finalist of RuPaul's Drag Race (season 14)
- Kathleen Turner, actor (transferred to University of Maryland, Baltimore County)

== Art and media ==
- Julie Blackmon, photographer
- Bessie Breuer, journalist, novelist, writer, and playwright
- Theodore Melfi, director and screenwriter of Hidden Figures
- Benjamin Rader, historian

== Public officials ==
- Roy Blunt, former Minority Whip of the United States House of Representatives; former U.S. senator
- Eric Burlison, former Missouri senator; current U.S. congressman from Missouri's 7th congressional district
- Donald Dedmon, fourth president of Radford University and ninth (acting) president of Marshall University
- Lacey Eastburn, tenth president of Northern Arizona University
- M. Douglas Harpool, judge of the United States District Court for the Western District of Missouri
- Bob Holden, former governor of Missouri
- Lincoln Hough, Republican member of the Missouri Senate
- Margaret B. Kelly, former Missouri state auditor
- Austin Petersen, former 2016 presidential candidate for the Libertarian Party nomination
- Carrie Tergin, former Jefferson City mayor
- Todd Tiahrt, former U.S. congressman from Kansas's 4th congressional district and current Republican national committeeman from Kansas
- Seth Rackers, formerly partied with the Ying Yang Twins, and current Lead Sewer Inspector for Jefferson City

== Military ==
- Frank J. Grass, United States Army general and chief of the National Guard Bureau
- Jarrett Robertson, major general in the United States Army

== Engineers ==
- Geraldine Holm Hoch, engineer at Lockheed Martin and Northrop Grumman

== Scientists ==
- Caleb Hickman, biologist, zoologist
- Kim Medley, environmental scientist at Washington University in St. Louis
- Dorothy Martin Simon, physical chemist
