= 99 to Beat (American game show) =

American game show

- Genre: Game show
- Directed by: Ollie Bartlett
- Presented by: Ken Jeong; Erin Andrews
- Country of origin: United States
- Original language: English
- No. of seasons: 2
- No. of episodes: 18

Production
- Executive producers: Natalka Znak; Claire O'Donohoe; Katy Manley; Lee Smithurst; Ken Jeong
- Production location: Shinfield Studios
- Camera setup: Multi-camera
- Running time: 42-44 Minutes
- Production companies: Initial; Fox Entertainment

Original release
- Network: Fox
- Release: September 21, 2025 – present

99 to Beat is an American game show based on the Belgian game show of the same name that premiered on Fox on September 21, 2025. The series is hosted by Ken Jeong and Erin Andrews. The winner of season one, Peter Nevins, was crowned after 50 games.

On May 11, 2026, the series was renewed for a second season which premiered on September 23, 2026.

== Format ==
100 contestants compete in physical and unique challenges where the goal is not to finish first, nor to perform the best, but to not finish last. After each challenge, the player who came in last will be eliminated, which will add $10,000 to the pot. The last person standing (after a total of 50 games and 10 episodes, besides the season finale) will walk away with $1,000,000. Each episode has 4 solo games and one team game. In the event of a team game, the team who fails to win any heat or round or comes last will all be eliminated. Some team games feature team captains, which are decided randomly, and have teams drafted via a schoolyard pick. Other games feature multiple heats, with players or teams who come last in each heat put into the elimination heat. Finally, pair games have the pair who comes in last face off against each other (in the event of a team game, the losing team will be split in half until the required number of contestants to be eliminated is reached).

== Contestants ==
=== Season 1 ===
Results (Season 1)
Contestant	Age	Occupation	Residence	Place	Last place in the challenge	Status
Janice Silver	N/A	Real estate broker	New York	100th	Lei in a Balloon	Eliminated 1st on September 21, 2025
Tammy Garr	N/A	Jim's best friend	Texas	99th	Blow the Whistle	Eliminated 2nd on September 21, 2025
Darline	N/A	Student	Florida	98th	Guess the Weight	Eliminated 3rd on September 21, 2025
Phil Bracco	N/A	Tommy's father	New York	97th	Pretty Penne	Eliminated 4th on September 21, 2025
Aaron Murray	34	Actor	California	96th	Bucket Head Relay	Eliminated 5th on September 21, 2025
Avery Allsup	22	David Allsup's adopted sister	Texas	95th	Bucket Head Relay	Eliminated 6th on September 21, 2025
Aviounce Compton	25	Actress	Georgia	94th	Bucket Head Relay	Eliminated 7th on September 21, 2025
Brady Balenti	N/A	Store manager	Oklahoma	93rd	Bucket Head Relay	Eliminated 8th on September 21, 2025
Chaz Langley	51	Photographer	New York	92nd	Bucket Head Relay	Eliminated 9th on September 21, 2025
Frank Mustari	34	Clown wrestler	Florida	91st	Bucket Head Relay	Eliminated 10th on September 21, 2025
Marisa Levy	N/A	Project manager	Georgia	90th	Bucket Head Relay	Eliminated 11th on September 21, 2025
Morgan Ashley	N/A	Athlete	Georgia	89th	Bucket Head Relay	Eliminated 12th on September 21, 2025
Myles Thurman	N/A	Retail assistant manager	Missouri	88th	Bucket Head Relay	Eliminated 13th on September 21, 2025
Sandra Diaz-Twine	51	2x Survivor winner	North Carolina	87th	Bucket Head Relay	Eliminated 14th on September 21, 2025
Vicki Quisenberry	64	Property management	Kentucky	86th	Bucket Head Relay	Eliminated 15th on September 21, 2025
Yoshi Mori	N/A	Gymnastics coach	Hawaii	85th	Bucket Head Relay	Eliminated 16th on September 21, 2025
Jason	N/A	Business owner	Kentucky	84th	Find Your Name	Eliminated 17th on October 1, 2025
Agness	31	Opera singer	Pennsylvania	83rd	Nut Stackers	Eliminated 18th on October 1, 2025
Beth Nicole	28	Cosplay influencer	Florida	82nd	Potato Fork Catch	Eliminated 19th on October 1, 2025
Adam Gregory	58	Flight attendant	Nevada	81st	Sound It Out	Eliminated 20th on October 1, 2025
Cole Lindbergh	39	Sales enablement manager	Kansas	80th	Sound It Out	Eliminated 21st on October 1, 2025
Jeremiah Martinelli	23	Content creator	California	79th	Sound It Out	Eliminated 22nd on October 1, 2025
Jim Clingman	N/A	Tammy's best friend/Real estate broker	Iowa	78th	Sound It Out	Eliminated 23rd on October 1, 2025
LaNette Glenn	N/A	Host	Indiana	77th	Sound It Out	Eliminated 24th on October 1, 2025
Lindsey Shaw	36	Actress	California	76th	Sound It Out	Eliminated 25th on October 1, 2025
Lizzie Gale	N/A	Actress	California	75th	Sound It Out	Eliminated 26th on October 1, 2025
Phil Stokes	N/A	Competitive arm wrestler	North Carolina	74th	Sound It Out	Eliminated 27th on October 1, 2025
Sarah Snyder	N/A	Member of the Wagner family	Vermont	73rd	Sound It Out	Eliminated 28th on October 1, 2025
Jackie Graves	N/A	HR professional	Florida	72nd	Slingshot Balloon	Eliminated 29th on October 1, 2025
Donnell Clayton	33	Firefighter	Michigan	71st	Needle and Thread	Eliminated 30th on October 8, 2025
Aggie Gunnels	N/A	Julian's wife	Minnesota	70th	Gutter Bowl	Eliminated 31st on October 8, 2025
Amber Marie	27	Singer	Maryland	69th	Gutter Bowl	Eliminated 32nd on October 8, 2025
Bethany Jones	N/A	Member of the Wagner family	Indiana	68th	Gutter Bowl	Eliminated 33rd on October 8, 2025
Jonathan Hannon	N/A	Multiple world-record holder/David R.'s best friend	Michigan	67th	Gutter Bowl	Eliminated 34th on October 8, 2025
Merna Aodisho	34	Bank teller	California	66th	Gutter Bowl	Eliminated 35th on October 8, 2025
Phillip Snyder	N/A	Member of the Wagner family	Vermont	65th	Gutter Bowl	Eliminated 36th on October 8, 2025
Zoltan Berencsi	N/A	Producer	Georgia	64th	Gutter Bowl	Eliminated 37th on October 8, 2025
Dee Ortiz	46	Events coordinator	Connecticut	63rd	Hook a Duck	Eliminated 38th on October 8, 2025
Justin Brulla	39	Member of the Wagner family/Anna's husband	Missouri	62nd	Disc Twerking	Eliminated 39th on October 8, 2025
Tori Hoffman	27	Teacher	New Jersey	61st	Tape Lunch Box	Eliminated 40th on October 8, 2025
LaVonne Kroeger	63	Gaming grandma	California	60th	Frozen Pants	Eliminated 41st on October 15, 2025
Michaela Pearson	31	Marsha's daughter	Ohio	59th	Coin in a Glass	Eliminated 42nd on October 15, 2025
Sarah Kosar	N/A	Dog trainer	Pennsylvania	58th	Tape Measure Retract	Eliminated 43rd on October 15, 2025
King David Shad	32	Engineer	California	57th	Nail Balance	Eliminated 44th on October 15, 2025
J. Blake	31	Baker	Georgia	56th	—N/a	Withdrew on October 15, 2025
Arvind Srinivasaraghavan	33	Tech company owner	Missouri	55th	Domino Run	Eliminated 45th on October 15, 2025
Carla Romeus	24	Producer	New York	54th	Domino Run	Eliminated 46th on October 15, 2025
Courtney Lombardo	21	Lance's daughter	Ohio	53rd	Domino Run	Eliminated 47th on October 15, 2025
Gabe Lazarre	28	Basketball player	Florida	52nd	Domino Run	Eliminated 48th on October 15, 2025
Jordan Elyk	N/A	Marketing manager	Massachusetts	51st	Domino Run	Eliminated 49th on October 15, 2025
Richie Castronova	21	Gianna's brother	New York	50th	Domino Run	Eliminated 50th on October 15, 2025
Robbie Karstendiek	31	Business owner	Louisiana	49th	Domino Run	Eliminated 51st on October 15, 2025
Lance Lombardo	59	Courtney's father/Food service director	Connecticut	48th	Butterfly Catch	Eliminated 52nd on October 22, 2025
Sean Moragne	N/A	Personal trainer	Arkansas	47th	Balloon Cup Transfer	Eliminated 53rd on October 22, 2025
Julian Gunnels	N/A	Aggie's husband/Financial planner	Minnesota	46th	Piggy Bank Raid	Eliminated 54th on October 22, 2025
Grant Pumphrey	N/A	Member of the Wagner family/Rebekah's husband	Utah	45th	Boat Float	Eliminated 55th on October 22, 2025
Mae Messersmith	32	Optometric technician	Pennsylvania	44th	Boat Float	Eliminated 56th on October 22, 2025
Mariama	42	Poet/Artist	New York	43rd	Boat Float	Eliminated 57th on October 22, 2025
Michelle Sutton	44	Gym owner	Ohio	42nd	Boat Float	Eliminated 58th on October 22, 2025
Rebekah Pumphrey	N/A	Member of the Wagner family/Grant's wife	Utah	41st	Boat Float	Eliminated 59th on October 22, 2025
Nikki Kofkin	N/A	Hadieh's best friend/Realtor/Real estate agent	Illinois	40th	Hang a Painting	Eliminated 60th on October 22, 2025
Stormm Tucker	N/A	Community director	California	39th	Find a Light	Eliminated 61st on November 5, 2025
James Meadows	N/A	IT security consultant	Texas	38th	Cotton Spool	Eliminated 62nd on November 5, 2025
Collin Snyder	N/A	Member of the Wagner family/Leandra & Preston's brother	Utah	37th	Bubble Wrapped	Eliminated 63rd on November 5, 2025
Jake Pehrson	35	Member of the Wagner family/Tabi's husband	Arizona	36th	Tennis Ball Weave	Eliminated 64th on November 5, 2025
Mario Trela	N/A	Youth sports coach	Wisconsin	35th	Tennis Ball Weave	Eliminated 65th on November 5, 2025
Seth Smith	N/A	College professor	Ohio	34th	Tennis Ball Weave	Eliminated 66th on November 5, 2025
Will Wise	N/A	Basketball coach	Pennsylvania	33rd	Tennis Ball Weave	Eliminated 67th on November 5, 2025
Robert Boudwin	51	Former mascot	Texas	32nd	House of Cards	Eliminated 68th on November 5, 2025
Miko Hughes	39	Actor	California	31st	Land the Shot	Eliminated 69th on November 12, 2025
Chris Vinh	N/A	Stand-up comedian	New York	30th	Suitcase Curling	Eliminated 70th on November 12, 2025
David Rush	40	Multiple world record breaker	Idaho	29th	Pencil Jump	Eliminated 71st on November 12, 2025
Hadieh Tazangi	N/A	Nikki's best friend/Realtor/Real estate agent	Illinois	28th	Untangled	Eliminated 72nd on November 12, 2025
Jake Clark	25	Content creator	California	27th	Untangled	Eliminated 73rd on November 12, 2025
Joann Marsar	57	Singing waitress	New Jersey	26th	Untangled	Eliminated 74th on November 12, 2025
Luigi Venezia	40	Teacher	New Jersey	25th	Untangled	Eliminated 75th on November 12, 2025
Alex Beez	N/A	Afrobeats dancer	New Jersey	24th	Pop-Up Tent	Eliminated 76th on November 12, 2025
Gianna Castronova	25	Richie's sister/Nurse	New York	23rd	Upturned Cups	Eliminated 77th on November 19, 2025
Kevin McAllister	N/A	Facility manager	Virginia	22nd	Spring Head	Eliminated 78th on November 19, 2025
Marsha Baker	N/A	Michaela's mother/retired	Ohio	21st	Sleeping Bag Race	Eliminated 79th on November 19, 2025
Anna Brulla	38	Member of the Wagner family/Justin's wife	Missouri	20th	Traffic Cone Flip	Eliminated 80th on November 19, 2025
Cara Maria Sorbello	39	The Challenge winner	Florida	19th	Traffic Cone Flip	Eliminated 81st on November 19, 2025
Geraldine Moreno	33	TV Host/The Traitors contestant	California	18th	Traffic Cone Flip	Eliminated 82nd on November 19, 2025
Malissa Miles	37	Football coach	Nevada	17th	Traffic Cone Flip	Eliminated 83rd on November 19, 2025
Tabi Pehrson	N/A	Member of the Wagner family/Jake Pehrson's wife	Arizona	16th	Arc the Ball	Eliminated 84th on November 19, 2025
Ciara Hanna	34	Actress/Power Rangers Megaforce	California	15th	Ping Pong Obstacle Course	Eliminated 85th on December 3, 2025
Dakota McGee	31	Cosmetologist	Pennsylvania	14th	Ping Pong Obstacle Course	Eliminated 86th on December 3, 2025
David Allsup	23	Avery's adopted brother/soda shop employee	Texas	13th	Ping Pong Obstacle Course	Eliminated 87th on December 3, 2025
Kara Lee	40	Day trader	Oklahoma	12th	Ping Pong Obstacle Course	Eliminated 88th on December 3, 2025
Tommy Bracco	35	Phil Bracco's son/Broadway performer/Big Brother contestant	New York	11th	Ping Pong Obstacle Course	Eliminated 89th on December 3, 2025
Jared Jackson	21	Barista	New Jersey	10th	Snatch the Hat	Eliminated 90th on December 3, 2025
Leo Starrling	24	Ranch hand	Wyoming	9th	Candle Extinguisher	Eliminated 91st on December 3, 2025
Danni Boatwright	50	Survivor winner	Kansas	8th	Balance See Saw	Eliminated 92nd on December 3, 2025
Preston Snyder	20	Member of the Wagner family/Collin & Leandra's brother/student	Hawaii	7th	Tower of Boxes	Eliminated 93rd on December 3, 2025
Carlene Jones	35	Administrator	New York	6th	Confetti Sweep	Eliminated 94th on December 10, 2025
Miranda Harrison	32	Pest control exterminator/Deal or No Deal Island contestant	Florida	5th	3D Puzzle	Eliminated 95th on December 10, 2025
Ronald Mitchell	61	Firefighter/fire captain	Michigan	4th	Alphabetti Golf	Eliminated 96th on December 10, 2025
Jennifer Wang	25	Twitch streamer	California	3rd	Pendulum	Eliminated 97th on December 10, 2025
Leandra Snyder	26	Member of the Wagner family/Collin & Preston's sister	Utah	2nd	Grand Finale	Runner-up on December 10, 2025
Peter Nevins	45	Priest	Indiana	1st	Grand Finale	Winner on December 10, 2025

Color key:

This person was the winner
This person was the runner-up
This person finished third
This person finished fourth
This person finished fifth
This person finished sixth
This person finished seventh
This person finished eighth
This person finished ninth
This person finished tenth
This person finished eleventh
This person finished twelfth
This person finished thirteenth
This person finished fourteenth or the bottom 6 in this game
This person finished fifteenth or the bottom 5 in this game
This person is in the red team
This person is in the pink team
This person is in the orange team
This person is in the purple team
This person was the bottom 4 in this game
This person was the bottom 3 in this game
This person was the bottom 2 in this game
This person finished last and was eliminated
This person withdrew from the game
This person is safe

Standings (Season 1)
Contestant	Game																																																										
Contestant	Episode 1						Episode 2						Episode 3						Episode 4						Episode 5						Episode 6						Episode 7						Episode 8						Episode 9						Episode 10				
Contestant	Lei in a Balloon	Blow the Whistle	Guess the Weight	Pretty Penne	Bucket Head Relay		Find Your Name	Nut Stackers	Potato Fork Catch	Sound it Out		Slingshot Balloon	Needle and Thread	Gutter Bowl		Hook a Duck	Disc Twerking	Tape Lunch Box	Frozen Pants	Coin in a Glass	Tape Measure Retract	Nail Balance	Domino Run		Butterfly Catch	Balloon Cup Transfer	Piggy Bank Raid	Boat Float		Hang a Painting	Find a Light	Cotton Spool	Bubble Wrapped	Tennis Ball Weave		House of Cards	Land the Shot	Suitcase Curling	Pencil Jump	Untangled		Pop-Up Tent	Upturned Cups	Spring Head	Sleeping Bag Race	Traffic Cone Flip		Arc the Ball	Ping Pong Obstacle Course		Snatch the Hat	Candle Extinguisher	Balance See Saw	Tower of Boxes	Confetti Sweep	3D Puzzle	Alphabetti Golf	Pendulum	Grand Finale
Peter Nevins	Safe	Safe	Safe	Safe	Safe		Safe	Safe	Safe	Safe		Safe	Safe	Safe		Safe	Safe	Safe	Safe	Safe	Safe	Safe	Safe		Safe	Safe	Safe	Safe		Safe	Safe	Safe	Safe	Safe		Safe	Safe	Safe	Safe	Safe		Safe	Safe	Bottom 2	Safe	Safe		Bottom 2	Safe		Safe	Safe	Safe	Safe	Bottom 3	Safe	Bottom 3	Bottom 3	1st
Leandra Snyder	Safe	Safe	Safe	Safe	Safe		Safe	Safe	Safe	Safe		Safe	Safe	Safe		Safe	Safe	Safe	Safe	Safe	Safe	Safe	Safe		Safe	Safe	Safe	Safe		Safe	Bottom 4	Safe	Safe	Safe		Safe	Safe	Safe	Safe	Safe		Safe	Safe	Safe	Safe	Safe		Bottom 4	Safe		Safe	Bottom 3	Safe	Safe	Safe	Bottom 3	Bottom 2	Bottom 2	2nd
Jennifer Wang	Safe	Safe	Safe	Safe	Safe		Safe	Safe	Safe	Safe		Safe	Safe	Safe		Safe	Safe	Safe	Safe	Safe	Safe	Safe	Safe		Safe	Safe	Safe	Safe		Bottom 2	Safe	Safe	Safe	Safe		Safe	Safe	Safe	Safe	Safe		Safe	Safe	Safe	Bottom 2	Safe		Safe	Safe		Safe	Bottom 2	Safe	Bottom 3	Safe	Safe	Safe	3rd	
Ronald Mitchell	Safe	Safe	Safe	Safe	Safe		Safe	Safe	Safe	Safe		Safe	Safe	Safe		Bottom 4	Safe	Safe	Safe	Safe	Safe	Bottom 4	Safe		Safe	Safe	Safe	Safe		Safe	Safe	Safe	Safe	Safe		Bottom 2	Safe	Safe	Safe	Safe		Safe	Safe	Safe	Bottom 4	Safe		Safe	Safe		Safe	Bottom 4	Safe	Safe	Safe	Bottom 2	4th		
Miranda Harrison	Safe	Safe	Safe	Safe	Safe		Safe	Safe	Safe	Safe		Safe	Safe	Safe		Safe	Safe	Safe	Safe	Bottom 3	Safe	Safe	Safe		Safe	Safe	Safe	Safe		Safe	Safe	Safe	Safe	Safe		Safe	Safe	Bottom 6	Safe	Safe		Safe	Bottom 3	Safe	Safe	Safe		Safe	Safe		Bottom 3	Safe	Safe	Bottom 2	Bottom 2	5th			
Carlene Jones	Safe	Safe	Safe	Safe	Safe		Safe	Safe	Safe	Safe		Safe	Safe	Safe		Safe	Safe	Safe	Safe	Safe	Safe	Safe	Safe		Safe	Safe	Safe	Safe		Safe	Safe	Safe	Safe	Safe		Bottom 4	Safe	Safe	Safe	Safe		Safe	Bottom 4	Safe	Safe	Safe		Safe	Safe		Bottom 4	Safe	Bottom 2	Safe	6th				
Preston Snyder	Safe	Safe	Safe	Safe	Safe		Safe	Safe	Safe	Safe		Bottom 4	Safe	Safe		Safe	Safe	Safe	Safe	Safe	Safe	Safe	Safe		Safe	Safe	Safe	Safe		Safe	Safe	Safe	Safe	Safe		Safe	Safe	Safe	Safe	Safe		Safe	Safe	Safe	Safe	Safe		Safe	Safe		Safe	Safe	Safe	7th					
Danni Boatwright	Safe	Safe	Safe	Safe	Safe		Safe	Safe	Safe	Safe		Safe	Safe	Safe		Safe	Safe	Safe	Safe	Safe	Safe	Safe	Safe		Safe	Safe	Bottom 2	Safe		Safe	Safe	Safe	Safe	Safe		Safe	Safe	Safe	Safe	Safe		Safe	Safe	Safe	Safe	Safe		Safe	Safe		Bottom 2	Safe	8th						
Leo Starrling	Safe	Safe	Bottom 3	Safe	Safe		Safe	Safe	Safe	Safe		Safe	Safe	Safe		Safe	Safe	Safe	Safe	Safe	Safe	Safe	Safe		Safe	Safe	Safe	Safe		Safe	Safe	Safe	Safe	Safe		Safe	Safe	Safe	Safe	Safe		Safe	Bottom 5	Safe	Safe	Safe		Safe	Safe		Safe	9th							
Jared Jackson	Safe	Safe	Bottom 4	Safe	Safe		Safe	Bottom 3	Safe	Safe		Safe	Safe	Safe		Safe	Safe	Bottom 3	Safe	Safe	Safe	Safe	Safe		Safe	Safe	Safe	Safe		Safe	Safe	Safe	Safe	Safe		Safe	Safe	Safe	Safe	Safe		Safe	Safe	Safe	Safe	Safe		Safe	Safe		10th								
Tommy Bracco	Safe	Safe	Safe	Safe	Safe		Safe	Safe	Safe	Safe		Safe	Safe	Safe		Bottom 2	Safe	Safe	Safe	Safe	Safe	Safe	Safe		Safe	Safe	Safe	Safe		Safe	Safe	Safe	Safe	Safe		Safe	Safe	Safe	Safe	Safe		Safe	Safe	Safe	Safe	Safe		Safe	Team Red	11th									
Kara Lee	Safe	Safe	Safe	Safe	Safe		Safe	Safe	Safe	Safe		Safe	Safe	Safe		Safe	Safe	Safe	Safe	Safe	Safe	Safe	Safe		Safe	Safe	Bottom 4	Safe		Safe	Safe	Safe	Safe	Safe		Safe	Safe	Safe	Safe	Safe		Safe	Bottom 2	Safe	Safe	Safe		Safe	Team Red	12th									
David Allsup	Safe	Safe	Safe	Safe	Safe		Safe	Safe	Safe	Safe		Safe	Safe	Safe		Safe	Safe	Safe	Safe	Safe	Safe	Bottom 3	Safe		Safe	Safe	Safe	Safe		Safe	Safe	Safe	Safe	Safe		Safe	Safe	Bottom 6	Safe	Safe		Safe	Safe	Bottom 3	Safe	Safe		Bottom 3	Team Red	13th									
Dakota McGee	Safe	Safe	Safe	Safe	Safe		Safe	Safe	Safe	Safe		Safe	Safe	Safe		Safe	Safe	Safe	Safe	Safe	Safe	Safe	Safe		Safe	Safe	Safe	Safe		Safe	Safe	Safe	Safe	Safe		Safe	Safe	Safe	Safe	Safe		Safe	Safe	Safe	Safe	Safe		Safe	Team Red	14th									
Ciara Hanna	Safe	Safe	Safe	Safe	Safe		Safe	Safe	Safe	Safe		Safe	Safe	Safe		Safe	Safe	Safe	Safe	Safe	Safe	Safe	Safe		Safe	Safe	Safe	Safe		Safe	Safe	Safe	Safe	Safe		Safe	Safe	Bottom 6	Safe	Safe		Safe	Safe	Safe	Safe	Safe		Safe	Team Red	15th									
Tabi Pehrson	Safe	Safe	Safe	Safe	Safe		Safe	Safe	Safe	Safe		Safe	Safe	Safe		Safe	Safe	Safe	Safe	Safe	Safe	Safe	Safe		Safe	Safe	Safe	Safe		Safe	Safe	Safe	Safe	Safe		Safe	Bottom 3	Safe	Safe	Safe		Safe	Safe	Safe	Safe	Safe		16th											
Malissa Miles	Safe	Safe	Safe	Safe	Safe		Safe	Safe	Safe	Safe		Safe	Safe	Safe		Safe	Safe	Safe	Safe	Safe	Safe	Safe	Safe		Safe	Bottom 2	Safe	Safe		Safe	Safe	Safe	Safe	Safe		Bottom 5	Safe	Safe	Safe	Safe		Safe	Safe	Safe	Safe	Team Pink	17th												
Geraldine Moreno	Bottom 2	Safe	Safe	Safe	Safe		Safe	Safe	Bottom 4	Safe		Safe	Safe	Safe		Safe	Safe	Safe	Safe	Safe	Safe	Safe	Safe		Safe	Safe	Safe	Safe		Safe	Bottom 2	Safe	Safe	Safe		Safe	Safe	Safe	Safe	Safe		Safe	Safe	Safe	Safe	Team Pink	18th												
Cara Maria Sorbello	Safe	Safe	Safe	Safe	Safe		Safe	Safe	Safe	Safe		Safe	Safe	Safe		Safe	Safe	Safe	Safe	Bottom 4	Safe	Safe	Safe		Safe	Safe	Safe	Safe		Safe	Safe	Safe	Bottom 3	Safe		Safe	Safe	Safe	Safe	Safe		Safe	Safe	Safe	Safe	Team Pink	19th												
Anna Brulla	Safe	Safe	Safe	Safe	Safe		Safe	Safe	Safe	Safe		Bottom 3	Safe	Safe		Safe	Bottom 2	Safe	Safe	Safe	Safe	Safe	Safe		Safe	Safe	Safe	Safe		Safe	Safe	Safe	Safe	Safe		Safe	Safe	Safe	Safe	Safe		Safe	Safe	Bottom 4	Bottom 3	Team Pink	20th												
Marsha Baker	Safe	Safe	Safe	Safe	Safe		Safe	Safe	Safe	Safe		Safe	Safe	Safe		Safe	Safe	Safe	Safe	Safe	Safe	Safe	Safe		Bottom 2	Bottom 4	Bottom 3	Safe		Safe	Safe	Safe	Safe	Safe		Bottom 3	Safe	Bottom 6	Bottom 3	Safe		Bottom 3	Safe	Safe	21st														
Kevin McAllister	Safe	Safe	Safe	Safe	Safe		Safe	Safe	Safe	Safe		Safe	Safe	Safe		Safe	Safe	Safe	Safe	Safe	Safe	Safe	Safe		Safe	Safe	Safe	Safe		Safe	Safe	Safe	Safe	Safe		Safe	Safe	Safe	Safe	Safe		Safe	Safe	22nd															
Gianna Castronova	Safe	Safe	Safe	Safe	Safe		Safe	Safe	Safe	Safe		Safe	Safe	Safe		Safe	Safe	Safe	Safe	Safe	Safe	Safe	Safe		Safe	Safe	Safe	Safe		Safe	Safe	Safe	Bottom 2	Safe		Safe	Safe	Safe	Bottom 2	Safe		Bottom 2	23rd																
Alex Beez	Safe	Safe	Safe	Safe	Safe		Safe	Safe	Safe	Safe		Safe	Safe	Safe		Safe	Safe	Safe	Safe	Safe	Safe	Safe	Safe		Safe	Safe	Safe	Safe		Safe	Safe	Safe	Safe	Safe		Safe	Safe	Safe	Safe	Safe		24th																	
Luigi Venezia	Safe	Safe	Safe	Safe	Safe		Safe	Safe	Safe	Safe		Safe	Safe	Safe		Safe	Safe	Safe	Safe	Safe	Safe	Safe	Safe		Safe	Safe	Safe	Safe		Safe	Safe	Safe	Safe	Safe		Safe	Safe	Safe	Safe	Team Luigi	25th																		
Joann Marsar	Safe	Safe	Safe	Safe	Safe		Safe	Safe	Safe	Safe		Safe	Safe	Safe		Safe	Safe	Safe	Safe	Safe	Safe	Bottom 2	Safe		Safe	Bottom 3	Safe	Safe		Safe	Safe	Safe	Safe	Safe		Safe	Bottom 2	Safe	Safe	Team Luigi	26th																		
Jake Clark	Safe	Safe	Safe	Safe	Safe		Bottom 3	Safe	Safe	Safe		Safe	Safe	Safe		Safe	Safe	Safe	Safe	Safe	Safe	Safe	Safe		Safe	Safe	Safe	Safe		Safe	Safe	Safe	Safe	Safe		Safe	Safe	Safe	Safe	Team Luigi	27th																		
Hadieh Tazangi	Safe	Safe	Safe	Safe	Safe		Safe	Safe	Safe	Safe		Safe	Safe	Safe		Safe	Safe	Safe	Safe	Safe	Safe	Safe	Safe		Safe	Safe	Safe	Safe		Safe	Safe	Safe	Bottom 4	Safe		Safe	Safe	Safe	Safe	Team Luigi	28th																		
David Rush	Safe	Safe	Safe	Safe	Safe		Safe	Safe	Safe	Safe		Safe	Safe	Safe		Safe	Safe	Safe	Safe	Safe	Safe	Safe	Safe		Safe	Safe	Safe	Safe		Safe	Safe	Safe	Safe	Safe		Safe	Safe	Bottom 6	29th																				
Chris Vinh	Safe	Safe	Safe	Safe	Safe		Safe	Safe	Safe	Safe		Safe	Bottom 4	Safe		Safe	Safe	Safe	Safe	Safe	Safe	Safe	Safe		Safe	Safe	Safe	Safe		Safe	Safe	Safe	Safe	Safe		Safe	Safe	30th																					
Miko Hughes	Safe	Safe	Safe	Safe	Safe		Safe	Safe	Safe	Safe		Safe	Safe	Safe		Safe	Safe	Safe	Safe	Safe	Safe	Safe	Safe		Safe	Safe	Safe	Safe		Safe	Safe	Safe	Safe	Safe		Safe	31st																						
Robert Boudwin	Safe	Safe	Safe	Safe	Safe		Safe	Safe	Safe	Safe		Safe	Safe	Safe		Safe	Safe	Safe	Safe	Safe	Safe	Safe	Safe		Bottom 3	Safe	Safe	Safe		Safe	Bottom 3	Safe	Safe	Safe		32nd																							
Will Wise	Safe	Safe	Safe	Safe	Safe		Safe	Safe	Safe	Safe		Safe	Safe	Safe		Safe	Safe	Safe	Safe	Safe	Safe	Safe	Safe		Safe	Safe	Safe	Safe		Safe	Safe	Safe	Safe	Team Will	33rd																								
Seth Smith	Safe	Safe	Safe	Safe	Safe		Safe	Safe	Safe	Safe		Safe	Bottom 2	Safe		Safe	Safe	Safe	Safe	Safe	Safe	Safe	Safe		Safe	Safe	Safe	Safe		Bottom 3	Safe	Bottom 2	Safe	Team Will	34th																								
Mario Trela	Safe	Safe	Safe	Safe	Safe		Safe	Safe	Safe	Safe		Safe	Safe	Safe		Bottom 3	Safe	Safe	Safe	Safe	Safe	Safe	Safe		Safe	Safe	Safe	Safe		Safe	Safe	Safe	Safe	Team Will	35th																								
Jake Pehrson	Safe	Safe	Safe	Safe	Safe		Safe	Safe	Safe	Safe		Safe	Safe	Safe		Safe	Safe	Safe	Safe	Safe	Bottom 4	Safe	Safe		Safe	Safe	Safe	Safe		Safe	Safe	Safe	Safe	Team Will	36th																								
Collin Snyder	Safe	Safe	Safe	Safe	Safe		Safe	Safe	Safe	Safe		Safe	Safe	Safe		Safe	Safe	Safe	Safe	Safe	Safe	Safe	Safe		Safe	Safe	Safe	Safe		Safe	Safe	Safe	37th																										
James Meadows	Safe	Safe	Safe	Safe	Safe		Safe	Safe	Safe	Safe		Safe	Safe	Safe		Safe	Safe	Safe	Safe	Safe	Safe	Safe	Safe		Safe	Safe	Safe	Safe		Bottom 4	Safe	38th																											
Stormm Tucker	Safe	Safe	Safe	Safe	Safe		Safe	Safe	Bottom 2	Safe		Safe	Safe	Safe		Safe	Safe	Safe	Bottom 2	Safe	Safe	Safe	Safe		Safe	Safe	Safe	Safe		Safe	39th																												
Nikki Kofkin	Safe	Safe	Safe	Safe	Safe		Safe	Safe	Safe	Safe		Safe	Safe	Safe		Safe	Safe	Safe	Safe	Safe	Safe	Safe	Safe		Safe	Safe	Safe	Safe		40th																													
Rebekah Pumphrey	Safe	Safe	Safe	Safe	Safe		Safe	Safe	Safe	Safe		Safe	Safe	Safe		Safe	Safe	Safe	Safe	Safe	Safe	Safe	Safe		Safe	Safe	Safe	Team Michelle	41st																														
Michelle Sutton	Safe	Safe	Safe	Safe	Safe		Bottom 2	Safe	Safe	Safe		Safe	Safe	Safe		Safe	Safe	Safe	Safe	Bottom 2	Bottom 2	Safe	Safe		Safe	Safe	Safe	Team Michelle	42nd																														
Mariama	Bottom 3	Bottom 3	Safe	Safe	Safe		Safe	Safe	Safe	Safe		Safe	Safe	Safe		Safe	Safe	Bottom 2	Safe	Safe	Safe	Safe	Safe		Bottom 4	Safe	Safe	Team Michelle	43rd																														
Mae Messersmith	Safe	Safe	Safe	Safe	Safe		Safe	Safe	Safe	Safe		Safe	Safe	Safe		Safe	Safe	Bottom 4	Safe	Safe	Safe	Safe	Safe		Safe	Safe	Safe	Team Michelle	44th																														
Grant Pumphrey	Safe	Safe	Safe	Safe	Safe		Safe	Safe	Safe	Safe		Safe	Safe	Safe		Safe	Safe	Safe	Safe	Safe	Safe	Safe	Safe		Safe	Safe	Safe	Team Michelle	45th																														
Julian Gunnels	Safe	Safe	Safe	Safe	Safe		Safe	Safe	Safe	Safe		Safe	Safe	Safe		Safe	Safe	Safe	Safe	Safe	Safe	Safe	Safe		Safe	Safe	46th																																
Sean Moragne	Safe	Safe	Safe	Safe	Safe		Safe	Safe	Safe	Safe		Safe	Bottom 3	Safe		Safe	Safe	Safe	Safe	Safe	Safe	Safe	Safe		Safe	47th																																	
Lance Lombardo	Safe	Safe	Safe	Safe	Safe		Safe	Safe	Safe	Safe		Safe	Safe	Safe		Safe	Safe	Safe	Safe	Safe	Bottom 3	Safe	Safe		48th																																		
Robbie Karstendiek	Safe	Safe	Safe	Safe	Safe		Safe	Safe	Safe	Safe		Safe	Safe	Safe		Safe	Safe	Safe	Safe	Safe	Safe	Safe	Team Purple	49th																																			
Richie Castronova	Safe	Safe	Safe	Safe	Safe		Safe	Safe	Safe	Safe		Safe	Safe	Safe		Safe	Safe	Safe	Safe	Safe	Safe	Safe	Team Purple	50th																																			
Jordan Elyk	Safe	Safe	Safe	Safe	Safe		Safe	Safe	Safe	Safe		Safe	Safe	Safe		Safe	Safe	Safe	Safe	Safe	Safe	Safe	Team Purple	51st																																			
Gabe Lazarre	Safe	Safe	Safe	Safe	Safe		Safe	Safe	Safe	Safe		Safe	Safe	Safe		Safe	Safe	Safe	Safe	Safe	Safe	Safe	Team Purple	52nd																																			
Courtney Lombardo	Safe	Safe	Safe	Safe	Safe		Safe	Safe	Safe	Safe		Safe	Safe	Safe		Safe	Safe	Safe	Safe	Safe	Safe	Safe	Team Purple	53rd																																			
Carla Romeus	Safe	Safe	Safe	Safe	Safe		Safe	Safe	Safe	Safe		Safe	Safe	Safe		Safe	Safe	Safe	Safe	Safe	Safe	Safe	Team Purple	54th																																			
Arvind Srinivasaraghavan	Safe	Bottom 2	Safe	Safe	Safe		Safe	Safe	Safe	Safe		Safe	Safe	Safe		Safe	Safe	Safe	Bottom 4	Safe	Safe	Safe	Team Purple	55th																																			
J. Blake	Safe	Safe	Safe	Safe	Safe		Safe	Safe	Safe	Safe		Safe	Safe	Safe		Safe	Safe	Safe	Safe	Safe	Safe	56th																																					
King David Shad	Safe	Safe	Safe	Safe	Safe		Safe	Safe	Safe	Safe		Safe	Safe	Safe		Safe	Safe	Safe	Safe	Safe	Safe	57th																																					
Sarah Kosar	Safe	Safe	Safe	Bottom 2	Safe		Safe	Safe	Safe	Safe		Safe	Safe	Safe		Safe	Safe	Safe	Bottom 3	Safe	58th																																						
Michaela Pearson	Safe	Safe	Safe	Safe	Safe		Safe	Safe	Safe	Safe		Safe	Safe	Safe		Safe	Safe	Safe	Safe	59th																																							
LaVonne Kroeger	Safe	Safe	Safe	Safe	Safe		Safe	Safe	Safe	Safe		Safe	Safe	Safe		Safe	Safe	Safe	60th																																								
Tori Hoffman	Safe	Safe	Safe	Safe	Safe		Bottom 4	Safe	Safe	Safe		Safe	Safe	Safe		Safe	Safe	61st																																									
Justin Brulla	Safe	Safe	Safe	Safe	Safe		Safe	Safe	Safe	Safe		Safe	Safe	Safe		Safe	62nd																																										
Dee Ortiz	Safe	Safe	Safe	Safe	Safe		Safe	Safe	Bottom 3	Safe		Safe	Safe	Safe		63rd																																											
Zoltan Berencsi	Safe	Safe	Safe	Safe	Safe		Safe	Safe	Safe	Safe		Safe	Safe	Team Orange	64th																																												
Phillip Snyder	Safe	Safe	Safe	Safe	Safe		Safe	Safe	Safe	Safe		Safe	Safe	Team Orange	65th																																												
Merna Aodisho	Safe	Safe	Safe	Safe	Safe		Safe	Safe	Safe	Safe		Safe	Safe	Team Orange	66th																																												
Jonathan Hannon	Safe	Safe	Safe	Safe	Safe		Safe	Safe	Safe	Safe		Safe	Safe	Team Orange	67th																																												
Bethany Jones	Safe	Safe	Safe	Safe	Safe		Safe	Safe	Safe	Safe		Safe	Safe	Team Orange	68th																																												
Amber Marie	Safe	Safe	Safe	Safe	Safe		Safe	Safe	Safe	Safe		Safe	Safe	Team Orange	69th																																												
Aggie Gunnels	Safe	Safe	Safe	Safe	Safe		Safe	Bottom 2	Safe	Safe		Bottom 2	Safe	Team Orange	70th																																												
Donnell Clayton	Safe	Safe	Safe	Safe	Safe		Safe	Safe	Safe	Safe		Safe	71st																																														
Jackie Graves	Safe	Safe	Safe	Safe	Safe		Safe	Safe	Safe	Safe		72nd																																															
Sarah Snyder	Safe	Safe	Safe	Safe	Safe		Safe	Safe	Safe	Team Steel Pan	73rd																																																
Phil Stokes	Safe	Safe	Safe	Safe	Safe		Safe	Safe	Safe	Team Steel Pan	74th																																																
Lizzie Gale	Safe	Safe	Safe	Safe	Safe		Safe	Safe	Safe	Team Steel Pan	75th																																																
Lindsey Shaw	Safe	Safe	Safe	Safe	Safe		Safe	Safe	Safe	Team Steel Pan	76th																																																
LaNette Glenn	Safe	Safe	Safe	Safe	Safe		Safe	Safe	Safe	Team Steel Pan	77th																																																
Jim Clingman	Safe	Safe	Safe	Safe	Safe		Safe	Safe	Safe	Team Steel Pan	78th																																																
Jeremiah Martinelli	Safe	Safe	Safe	Safe	Safe		Safe	Safe	Safe	Team Steel Pan	79th																																																
Cole Lindbergh	Safe	Safe	Safe	Safe	Safe		Safe	Safe	Safe	Team Steel Pan	80th																																																
Adam Gregory	Safe	Safe	Bottom 2	Bottom 3	Safe		Safe	Safe	Safe	Team Steel Pan	81st																																																
Beth Nicole	Safe	Safe	Safe	Safe	Safe		Safe	Safe	82nd																																																		
Agness	Safe	Safe	Safe	Safe	Safe		Safe	83rd																																																			
Jason	Safe	Safe	Safe	Safe	Safe		84th																																																				
Yoshi Mori	Safe	Safe	Safe	Safe	Team Purple	85th																																																					
Vicki Quisenberry	Safe	Safe	Safe	Safe	Team Purple	86th																																																					
Sandra Diaz-Twine	Safe	Bottom 4	Safe	Safe	Team Purple	87th																																																					
Myles Thurman	Safe	Safe	Safe	Safe	Team Purple	88th																																																					
Morgan Ashley	Safe	Safe	Safe	Safe	Team Purple	89th																																																					
Marisa Levy	Safe	Safe	Safe	Safe	Team Purple	90th																																																					
Frank Mustari	Safe	Safe	Safe	Safe	Team Purple	91st																																																					
Chaz Langley	Safe	Safe	Safe	Safe	Team Purple	92nd																																																					
Brady Balenti	Safe	Safe	Safe	Safe	Team Purple	93rd																																																					
Aviounce Compton	Safe	Safe	Safe	Safe	Team Purple	94th																																																					
Avery Allsup	Safe	Safe	Safe	Safe	Team Purple	95th																																																					
Aaron Murray	Safe	Safe	Safe	Safe	Team Purple	96th																																																					
Phil Bracco	Safe	Safe	Safe	97th																																																							
Darline	Safe	Safe	98th																																																								
Tammy Garr	Safe	99th																																																									
Janice Silver	100th																																																										

=== Season 2 ===
Results (Season 2)
Contestant	Age	Occupation	Residence	Place	Last place in the challenge	Status
Dr. Kathy Waggoner	65	Pediatrician	North Carolina	100th	Ball Drop	Eliminated 1st on September 23, 2026
Debbie	N/A	Summer's mother/Occupational therapist	California	99th	A Hand Full	Eliminated 2nd on September 23, 2026
Rawlins	26	LEGO robotics manager	New York	98th	Squat a Duck	Eliminated 3rd on September 23, 2026
Serena Lange	26	Model	California	97th	Nut Slide	Eliminated 4th on September 23, 2026
Alexis Pruitt	32	Health insurance worker	Kentucky	96th	Ready to Pop	Eliminated 5th on September 23, 2026
Ashleigh Abrams	N/A	Kyle's wife	Illinois	95th	Ready to Pop	Eliminated 6th on September 23, 2026
Johnny Youssef	40	Marketing	Georgia	94th	Ready to Pop	Eliminated 7th on September 23, 2026
Cathy Jacobson	N/A	Dance teacher	Illinois	93rd	Ready to Pop	Eliminated 8th on September 23, 2026
Hannah Riggs	N/A	Software engineer	Massachusetts	92nd	Ready to Pop	Eliminated 9th on September 23, 2026
Jeanice Stephenson	23	Part of the Stephenson triplets/Jean & Jeanet's sister	Alabama	91st	Ready to Pop	Eliminated 10th on September 23, 2026
Kelly W	N/A	TBA	TBA	90th	Ready to Pop	Eliminated 11th on September 23, 2026
Lauren Klem	20	Brian's daughter/Basketball player	Indiana	89th	Ready to Pop	Eliminated 12th on September 23, 2026
Lauren Macaulay	N/A	Podcaster	Ireland	88th	Ready to Pop	Eliminated 13th on September 23, 2026
Nomi Tref	N/A	Designer	New York	87th	Ready to Pop	Eliminated 14th on September 23, 2026
Sophie Graziano	23	TBA	TBA	86th	Ready to Pop	Eliminated 15th on September 23, 2026
Zach Janes	N/A	Part of the Janes siblings/Esther & Ben's brother	Colorado	85th	Ready to Pop	Eliminated 16th on September 23, 2026
Mel	N/A	Scientist	Michigan	84th	Unboxed	Eliminated 17th on September 30, 2026
D'Mario Hill	N/A	King of Games	Washington, D.C.	83rd	Column of Cans	Eliminated 18th on September 30, 2026
Summer	N/A	Debbie's daughter/Occupational therapist	California	82nd	—N/a	Withdrew on September 30, 2026
Samantha	23	Graduate student	Texas	81st	Weigh To Go	Eliminated 19th on September 30, 2026
Dia Gilbert	N/A	Shahid's mother	Virginia	80th	Chain Reaction	Eliminated 20th on September 30, 2026
Elijah	37	Singer/Songwriter	Michigan	79th	Chain Reaction	Eliminated 21st on September 30, 2026
Jason Lewis	N/A	TBA	TBA	78th	Chain Reaction	Eliminated 22nd on September 30, 2026
Jen Jendusa	N/A	TBA	Ireland	77th	Chain Reaction	Eliminated 23rd on September 30, 2026
Kayla	N/A	TBA	TBA	76th	Chain Reaction	Eliminated 24th on September 30, 2026
Dr. Limitless	46	Leadership consultant	Texas	75th	Chain Reaction	Eliminated 25th on September 30, 2026
Michael W.	53	Alligator wrestler	Florida	74th	Chain Reaction	Eliminated 26th on September 30, 2026
Nate	29	MMA fighter	TBA	73rd	Chain Reaction	Eliminated 27th on September 30, 2026
Grandpa Rob	N/A	TBA	TBA	72nd	Chain Reaction	Eliminated 28th on September 30, 2026
Tristyn Kendall	43	Model/Squid Game: The Challenge contestant	Missouri	71st	Chain Reaction	Eliminated 29th on September 30, 2026
Paul Mount	81	Army veteran	Nevada	70th	Slam Dunk	Eliminated 30th on September 30, 2026
Kevin Gonzalez	26	Part of the Gonzalez triplets/Realtor/David & Jason's brother	California	69th	Pick A Flower	Eliminated 31st on October 7, 2026
Karan Ashley	51	Actress/Mighty Morphin Power Rangers	California	68th	Cold Hearted	Eliminated 32nd on October 7, 2026
Tiana	N/A	Mail carrier	New Jersey	67th	Cold Hearted	Eliminated 33rd on October 7, 2026
Jordan Heller	63	The Heller Brothers' Uncle/The Golden Bachelorette contestant	Illinois	66th	On the Edge	Eliminated 34th on October 7, 2026
Jean Stephenson	23	Part of the Stephenson triplets/NICU Nurse/Jeanet & Jeanice's sister	Alabama	65th	Measuring Up	Eliminated 35th on October 7, 2026
Cathy C.	N/A	Retired HR director	California	64th	Hands Off	Eliminated 36th on October 7, 2026
Braxx	28	TBA	TBA	63rd	Tangled Up	Eliminated 37th on October 14, 2026
Jakala	N/A	Boys & Girls Club worker	Virginia	62nd	Tangled Up	Eliminated 38th on October 14, 2026
Lambo	37	TBA	TBA	61st	Tangled Up	Eliminated 39th on October 14, 2026
Lisa G.	N/A	Member service associate/Nautica's mother	Maryland	60th	Tangled Up	Eliminated 40th on October 14, 2026
Lisa Herrera	N/A	Hospital accountant	Utah	59th	Tangled Up	Eliminated 41st on October 14, 2026
Michael Shields	N/A	TBA	Iowa	58th	Tangled Up	Eliminated 42nd on October 14, 2026
Nautica	N/A	Model/Lisa G.'s daughter	Washington, D.C.	57th	Tangled Up	Eliminated 43rd on October 14, 2026
Reece Heller	25	Part of the Heller brothers/Sage & Holden's brother/Wrestling coach	Illinois	56th	Tangled Up	Eliminated 44th on October 14, 2026
Susan Noles	69	The Golden Bachelor alum	Pennsylvania	55th	Tangled Up	Eliminated 45th on October 14, 2026
DaQuendra "Quen"	N/A	Model	New York/California	54th	Ball Balance	Eliminated 46th on October 14, 2026
Arun Kumar	60	Operating partner/The Amazing Race contestant	Michigan	53rd	No Mean Feet	Eliminated 47th on October 14, 2026
Camille Wilson	30	Hospitality guru	Connecticut	52nd	Pizza Stack	Eliminated 48th on October 14, 2026
Austin Xander Martin	N/A	Food and beverage consultant	Georgia	51st	Piggy Bank Roll	Eliminated 49th on October 14, 2026
Stefanie Burgett	45	Business owner	Alabama	50th	Head Catch	Eliminated 50th on October 21, 2026
Esther Janes	26	Part of the Janes siblings/Zach & Ben's sister	TBA	49th	Sponge Race	Eliminated 51st on October 21, 2026
Holden Heller	27	Part of the Heller brothers/Commodities trader/Sage & Reece's brother	Illinois/Pennsylvania	48th	Sponge Race	Eliminated 52nd on October 21, 2026
Jess Yang	N/A	AI manager/David B.'s best friend	Pennsylvania	47th	Sponge Race	Eliminated 53rd on October 21, 2026
LaMonica Birmingham	N/A	Realtor	Texas	46th	Sponge Race	Eliminated 54th on October 21, 2026
Niko	37	TBA	TBA	45th	Sponge Race	Eliminated 55th on October 21, 2026
Nikita Kodjak	26	Graduate student/Beast Games contestant	California	44th	Sponge Race	Eliminated 56th on October 21, 2026
Spencer Newman	33	Photographer	Illinois	43rd	Sponge Race	Eliminated 57th on October 21, 2026
Pierre Bacall	35	Media entrepreneur	Michigan	42nd	Clowning Around	Eliminated 58th on October 21, 2026
Daya Betty	30	Drag queen	Illinois	41st	Target Practice	Eliminated 59th on October 21, 2026
Deb Frederick	53	Fashion boutique owner/Diana's twin sister	Florida	40th	Thimble Tower	Eliminated 60th on October 21, 2026
Adriel Ruiz	35	Content Creator	New York	39th	Fish Fling	Eliminated 61st on November 4, 2026
David Gonzalez	26	Part of the Gonzalez triplets/Kevin & Jason's brother/Actor	TBA	38th	Rope Wrangle	Eliminated 62nd on November 4, 2026
Kelly Voltz	N/A	Sue's daughter/Squash coach	Connecticut	37th	Color Match	Eliminated 63rd on November 4, 2026
Sue Voltz	65	Kelly V.'s mother/Research consultant	Connecticut	36th	Tea Cup Balance	Eliminated 64th on November 4, 2026
Javan Whitaker	33	Actor	Texas	35th	Water Balloon Weave	Eliminated 65th on November 4, 2026
Jeanet Stephenson	23	Part of the Stephenson triplets/Jean & Jeanice's sister	Alabama	34th	Water Balloon Weave	Eliminated 66th on November 4, 2026
Kelley Thrasher	42	Celebrity Impersonator	Kansas	33rd	Water Balloon Weave	Eliminated 67th on November 4, 2026
Rob Morales	N/A	Entrepreneur	TBA	32nd	Water Balloon Weave	Eliminated 68th on November 4, 2026
Shahid Hinton	26	Dia's son	Virginia	31st	Water Balloon Weave	Eliminated 69th on November 4, 2026
Shant Khamo	23	Registered nurse/ICU nurse	Nevada	30th	Ball Party	Eliminated 70th on November 11, 2026
Brian Klem	54	Lauren K.'s father/Basketball coach/Content creator	Indiana	29th	Domino Balance	Eliminated 71st on November 11, 2026
Brandon Baker	37	Director of marketing/The Circle contestant	Ohio	28th	Power Up	Eliminated 72nd on November 11, 2026
David Howell	N/A	Pastor	Oregon	27th	Power Up	Eliminated 73rd on November 11, 2026
EP Bourgoyne	N/A	Student	Louisiana	26th	Power Up	Eliminated 74th on November 11, 2026
Jean-Paul	N/A	TBA	TBA	25th	Power Up	Eliminated 75th on November 11, 2026
Raquel Sharper	56	Motivational speaker	TBA	24th	Spaced Out	Eliminated 76th on November 11, 2026
Lauren Schad	31	Former Pro Volleyball Player/Rug designer	South Dakota	23rd	Car Tire Bowling	Eliminated 77th on November 11, 2026
Quinn Martin	28	Big Brother 26 contestant/Twitch streamer	Oklahoma	22nd	Excess Baggage	Eliminated 78th on November 18, 2026
David Betancourt	29	Product manager/Jess' best friend	Virginia	21st	Defrost	Eliminated 79th on November 18, 2026
Gabby Bellettieri	33	Brand marketing director/Kellie's wife	New York	20th	Leg Thrower	Eliminated 80th on November 18, 2026
Dakota Rivers	25	Professional basketball player	Florida	19th	Blind Luck	Eliminated 81st on November 18, 2026
Ashley Klinger	37	Showgirl/Dancer	New York	18th	Cut the Tension	Eliminated 82nd on November 18, 2026
Diner	24	Waitress	California	17th	Cut the Tension	Eliminated 83rd on November 18, 2026
Gerry Matthews	N/A	Retired carpenter	Puerto Rico	16th	Cut the Tension	Eliminated 84th on November 18, 2026
Jason Gonzalez	26	Part of the Gonzalez triplets/Kevin & David's brother/Actor	TBA	15th	Cut the Tension	Eliminated 85th on November 18, 2026
Kourtney Lehman	N/A	ER nurse	Oklahoma	14th	Cut the Tension	Eliminated 86th on November 18, 2026
Luke White	N/A	Realtor	North Carolina	13th	Cut the Tension	Eliminated 87th on November 18, 2026
Sage Heller	28	AI architect/Part of the Heller brothers/Holden & Reece's brother	Illinois	TBA	TBA	Participating
Ben Janes	27	Part of the Janes siblings/Zach & Esther's brother	Colorado	TBA	TBA	Participating
Kyle Abrams	34	Ashleigh's husband/Love Is Blind contestant/Cinematographer	Illinois	TBA	TBA	Participating
Zac Kelley	N/A	Sales Executive	TBA	TBA	TBA	Participating
Murn Roberts	N/A	Realtor/Yoga instructor	Tennessee	TBA	TBA	Participating
Flo	N/A	Entrepreneur	Florida	TBA	TBA	Participating
Diana Ed	53	Fashion boutique owner/Deb's twin sister	Florida	TBA	TBA	Participating
Adam Patterson	47	Promoter	Kentucky	TBA	TBA	Participating
Tony	N/A	Retired astronaut	Texas	TBA	TBA	Participating
Jacoby Clingman	31	Flight attendant/Jim Clingman's son	Illinois	TBA	TBA	Participating
Kellie Nalbandian	33	Gabby's wife/Survivor 45 contestant/Nurse	New York	TBA	TBA	Participating
Michael O'Rear	30	Electrical Designer	Tennessee	TBA	TBA	Participating

Color key:

This person was the winner
This person was the runner-up or in the silver team
This person finished third
This person finished fourth
This person finished fifth
This person finished sixth
This person finished seventh
This person finished eighth
This person finished ninth
This person finished tenth
This person finished eleventh
This person finished twelfth
This person finished thirteenth
This person finished fourteenth
This person finished fifteenth or the bottom 5 in this game
This person is in the pink team
This person is in the red team
This person is in the orange team
This person is in the light green team
This person is in the dark green team
This person is in the light blue team
This person is in the dark blue team
This person is in the purple team
This person was the bottom 4 in this game
This person was the bottom 3 in this game
This person was the bottom 2 in this game
This person withdrew from the game
This person finished last and was eliminated
This person is safe

Standings (Season 2)
Contestant	Game																																																			
Contestant	Episode 1						Episode 2						Episode 3					Episode 4						Episode 5						Episode 6						Episode 7						Episode 8						Episode 9				
Contestant	Ball Drop	A Hand Full	Squat a Duck	Nut Slide	Ready to Pop		Unboxed	Column of Cans	Weigh to Go	Chain Reaction		Slam Dunk	Pick a Flower	Cold Hearted	On the Edge	Measuring Up	Hands Off	Tangled Up		Ball Balance	No Mean Feet	Pizza Stack	Piggy Bank Roll	Head Catch	Sponge Race		Clowning Around	Target Practice	Thimble Tower	Fish Fling	Rope Wrangle	Color Match	Tea Cup Balance	Water Balloon Weave		Ball Party	Domino Balance	Power Up		Spaced Out	Car Tire Bowling	Excess Baggage	Defrost	Leg Thower	Blind Luck	Cut the Tension		TBA	TBA	TBA	TBA	TBA
Flo	Safe	Safe	Safe	Safe	Safe		Safe	Safe	Safe	Safe		Safe	Safe	Safe	Safe	Safe	Safe	Safe		Safe	Safe	Safe	Safe	Safe	Safe		Safe	Safe	Safe	Safe	Safe	Safe	Safe	Safe		Safe	Safe	Safe		Safe	Safe	Safe	Safe	Safe	Safe	Safe		TBA	TBA	TBA	TBA	TBA
Michael O'Rear	Safe	Safe	Safe	Safe	Safe		Safe	Safe	Safe	Safe		Safe	Safe	Safe	Safe	Safe	Safe	Safe		Safe	Safe	Safe	Safe	Safe	Safe		Safe	Safe	Safe	Safe	Safe	Safe	Safe	Safe		Safe	Safe	Safe		Safe	Safe	Safe	Safe	Safe	Safe	Safe		TBA	TBA	TBA	TBA	TBA
Murn Roberts	Safe	Safe	Safe	Safe	Safe		Safe	Safe	Safe	Safe		Safe	Safe	Safe	Safe	Safe	Safe	Safe		Safe	Safe	Safe	Safe	Safe	Safe		Safe	Safe	Safe	Safe	Safe	Safe	Safe	Safe		Safe	Safe	Safe		Safe	Safe	Safe	Safe	Safe	Safe	Safe		TBA	TBA	TBA	TBA	TBA
Kyle Abrams	Safe	Safe	Safe	Safe	Safe		Safe	Safe	Safe	Safe		Safe	Safe	Safe	Safe	Safe	Safe	Safe		Safe	Safe	Safe	Safe	Safe	Safe		Safe	Safe	Safe	Safe	Safe	Safe	Safe	Safe		Safe	Safe	Safe		Safe	Safe	Safe	Safe	Safe	Bottom 2	Safe		TBA	TBA	TBA	TBA	TBA
Kellie Nalbandian	Safe	Safe	Safe	Safe	Safe		Safe	Safe	Safe	Safe		Safe	Safe	Safe	Safe	Safe	Safe	Safe		Safe	Safe	Safe	Safe	Safe	Safe		Safe	Safe	Safe	Safe	Safe	Safe	Safe	Safe		Safe	Safe	Safe		Safe	Safe	Bottom 4	Bottom 2	Safe	Safe	Safe		TBA	TBA	TBA	TBA	TBA
Zac Kelley	Safe	Safe	Safe	Safe	Safe		Safe	Safe	Safe	Safe		Safe	Safe	Safe	Safe	Safe	Safe	Safe		Safe	Safe	Safe	Safe	Safe	Safe		Safe	Safe	Safe	Safe	Safe	Safe	Safe	Safe		Safe	Safe	Safe		Safe	Bottom 2	Safe	Safe	Safe	Bottom 3	Safe		TBA	TBA	TBA	TBA	TBA
Adam Patterson	Safe	Safe	Safe	Safe	Safe		Safe	Safe	Safe	Safe		Safe	Safe	Safe	Safe	Safe	Safe	Safe		Safe	Safe	Safe	Safe	Safe	Safe		Safe	Safe	Safe	Safe	Safe	Safe	Safe	Safe		Bottom 4	Safe	Safe		Safe	Safe	Safe	Safe	Safe	Safe	Safe		TBA	TBA	TBA	TBA	TBA
Ben Janes	Safe	Safe	Safe	Safe	Safe		Safe	Safe	Safe	Safe		Safe	Safe	Safe	Safe	Safe	Safe	Safe		Safe	Safe	Safe	Safe	Safe	Safe		Safe	Safe	Safe	Safe	Safe	Bottom 2	Safe	Safe		Safe	Safe	Safe		Safe	Safe	Safe	Safe	Safe	Safe	Safe		TBA	TBA	TBA	TBA	TBA
Sage Heller	Safe	Safe	Safe	Safe	Safe		Safe	Safe	Safe	Safe		Safe	Safe	Safe	Safe	Safe	Safe	Safe		Safe	Safe	Safe	Safe	Safe	Safe		Safe	Safe	Safe	Bottom 4	Safe	Bottom 3	Safe	Safe		Safe	Safe	Safe		Safe	Safe	Safe	Safe	Safe	Safe	Safe		TBA	TBA	TBA	TBA	TBA
Diana Ed	Safe	Safe	Safe	Safe	Safe		Safe	Safe	Safe	Safe		Safe	Safe	Safe	Safe	Safe	Safe	Safe		Safe	Safe	Safe	Safe	Safe	Safe		Safe	Bottom 3	Safe	Safe	Safe	Safe	Safe	Safe		Safe	Safe	Safe		Safe	Safe	Bottom 5	Bottom 3	Bottom 4	Bottom 4	Safe		TBA	TBA	TBA	TBA	TBA
Tony	Safe	Safe	Safe	Safe	Safe		Safe	Safe	Safe	Safe		Safe	Safe	Safe	Safe	Safe	Safe	Safe		Safe	Safe	Safe	Safe	Bottom 3	Safe		Safe	Safe	Safe	Safe	Safe	Safe	Safe	Safe		Safe	Bottom 3	Safe		Safe	Safe	Safe	Safe	Safe	Safe	Safe		TBA	TBA	TBA	TBA	TBA
Jacoby Clingman	Safe	Safe	Safe	Safe	Safe		Safe	Safe	Safe	Safe		Safe	Safe	Safe	Safe	Safe	Bottom 3	Safe		Safe	Safe	Safe	Safe	Safe	Safe		Safe	Safe	Safe	Safe	Safe	Safe	Safe	Safe		Safe	Safe	Safe		Safe	Safe	Bottom 2	Safe	Safe	Safe	Safe		TBA	TBA	TBA	TBA	TBA
Luke White	Safe	Safe	Safe	Bottom 2	Safe		Safe	Safe	Safe	Safe		Safe	Safe	Safe	Safe	Safe	Safe	Safe		Safe	Safe	Safe	Safe	Safe	Safe		Safe	Safe	Safe	Safe	Safe	Safe	Safe	Safe		Safe	Safe	Safe		Bottom 2	Safe	Safe	Safe	Safe	Safe	Team Blue	13th					
Kourtney Lehman	Safe	Safe	Safe	Safe	Safe		Safe	Safe	Safe	Safe		Safe	Safe	Safe	Safe	Safe	Safe	Safe		Safe	Safe	Safe	Safe	Safe	Safe		Safe	Safe	Safe	Safe	Safe	Safe	Safe	Safe		Safe	Safe	Safe		Safe	Safe	Safe	Safe	Safe	Safe	Team Blue	14th					
Jason Gonzalez	Safe	Safe	Safe	Safe	Safe		Safe	Safe	Safe	Safe		Safe	Safe	Safe	Safe	Safe	Safe	Safe		Safe	Safe	Safe	Safe	Safe	Safe		Safe	Safe	Safe	Safe	Bottom 2	Safe	Safe	Safe		Safe	Safe	Safe		Safe	Safe	Safe	Safe	Safe	Safe	Team Blue	15th					
Gerry Matthews	Safe	Safe	Safe	Safe	Safe		Safe	Safe	Safe	Safe		Safe	Safe	Safe	Bottom 2	Safe	Safe	Safe		Safe	Safe	Safe	Safe	Safe	Safe		Safe	Safe	Bottom 2	Safe	Safe	Safe	Safe	Safe		Bottom 3	Safe	Safe		Safe	Safe	Safe	Safe	Safe	Safe	Team Blue	16th					
Diner	Safe	Safe	Safe	Safe	Safe		Safe	Safe	Safe	Safe		Safe	Safe	Safe	Safe	Safe	Safe	Safe		Safe	Safe	Safe	Safe	Safe	Safe		Safe	Safe	Safe	Safe	Safe	Safe	Safe	Safe		Safe	Safe	Safe		Bottom 3	Safe	Safe	Safe	Safe	Safe	Team Blue	17th					
Ashley Klinger	Safe	Safe	Safe	Safe	Safe		Safe	Safe	Safe	Safe		Safe	Safe	Safe	Safe	Safe	Safe	Safe		Safe	Safe	Safe	Bottom 4	Safe	Safe		Safe	Safe	Safe	Bottom 3	Safe	Safe	Safe	Safe		Safe	Safe	Safe		Bottom 4	Bottom 3	Safe	Safe	Bottom 3	Safe	Team Blue	18th					
Dakota Rivers	Safe	Safe	Safe	Safe	Safe		Safe	Safe	Safe	Safe		Safe	Safe	Bottom 4	Safe	Safe	Safe	Safe		Safe	Safe	Safe	Safe	Safe	Safe		Safe	Safe	Safe	Safe	Safe	Safe	Safe	Safe		Safe	Safe	Safe		Safe	Safe	Bottom 3	Safe	Bottom 2	19th							
Gabby Bellettieri	Safe	Safe	Safe	Safe	Safe		Safe	Safe	Safe	Safe		Safe	Safe	Safe	Safe	Safe	Safe	Safe		Safe	Safe	Safe	Safe	Safe	Safe		Safe	Bottom 2	Safe	Safe	Safe	Safe	Safe	Safe		Safe	Safe	Safe		Safe	Safe	Safe	Safe	20th								
David Betancourt	Safe	Safe	Safe	Safe	Safe		Safe	Safe	Safe	Safe		Safe	Bottom 2	Safe	Safe	Safe	Safe	Safe		Safe	Safe	Safe	Safe	Safe	Safe		Safe	Safe	Safe	Bottom 2	Safe	Safe	Safe	Safe		Safe	Safe	Safe		Safe	Safe	Safe	21st									
Quinn Martin	Safe	Safe	Safe	Safe	Safe		Safe	Safe	Safe	Safe		Safe	Safe	Safe	Safe	Safe	Safe	Safe		Safe	Safe	Safe	Safe	Safe	Safe		Safe	Safe	Safe	Safe	Safe	Safe	Safe	Safe		Safe	Safe	Safe		Safe	Safe	Safe										
Lauren Schad	Safe	Safe	Safe	Safe	Safe		Safe	Safe	Safe	Safe		Safe	Safe	Safe	Safe	Safe	Safe	Safe		Safe	Safe	Safe	Safe	Safe	Safe		Safe	Safe	Safe	Safe	Safe	Safe	Safe	Safe		Safe	Safe	Safe		Safe	23rd											
Raquel Sharper	Safe	Safe	Safe	Safe	Safe		Safe	Safe	Safe	Safe		Safe	Safe	Safe	Safe	Safe	Safe	Safe		Bottom 4	Safe	Safe	Safe	Safe	Safe		Safe	Safe	Safe	Safe	Safe	Safe	Safe	Safe		Safe	Safe	Safe		24th												
Jean-Paul	Safe	Safe	Safe	Safe	Safe		Safe	Safe	Safe	Safe		Safe	Safe	Safe	Safe	Safe	Safe	Safe		Safe	Safe	Safe	Safe	Safe	Safe		Safe	Safe	Safe	Safe	Safe	Safe	Safe	Safe		Safe	Safe	Team Purple	25th													
EP Bourgoyne	Safe	Safe	Safe	Safe	Safe		Safe	Safe	Safe	Safe		Safe	Safe	Safe	Safe	Safe	Safe	Safe		Safe	Safe	Safe	Safe	Safe	Safe		Safe	Safe	Safe	Safe	Safe	Safe	Safe	Safe		Safe	Safe	Team Purple	26th													
David Howell	Bottom 2	Safe	Safe	Safe	Safe		Safe	Safe	Safe	Safe		Safe	Safe	Safe	Safe	Safe	Safe	Safe		Safe	Safe	Safe	Safe	Safe	Safe		Safe	Safe	Safe	Safe	Safe	Safe	Safe	Safe		Safe	Safe	Team Purple	27th													
Brandon Baker	Safe	Safe	Safe	Safe	Safe		Safe	Safe	Bottom 2	Safe		Safe	Safe	Safe	Safe	Safe	Safe	Safe		Safe	Safe	Safe	Safe	Safe	Safe		Safe	Safe	Safe	Safe	Safe	Safe	Safe	Safe		Safe	Safe	Team Purple	28th													
Brian Klem	Safe	Safe	Safe	Safe	Safe		Safe	Safe	Safe	Safe		Safe	Safe	Safe	Safe	Safe	Safe	Safe		Safe	Safe	Safe	Safe	Safe	Safe		Bottom 2	Safe	Bottom 3	Safe	Safe	Safe	Safe	Safe		Bottom 2	29th															
Shant Khamo	Safe	Safe	Safe	Safe	Safe		Safe	Bottom 4	Safe	Safe		Safe	Safe	Safe	Safe	Safe	Safe	Safe		Safe	Bottom 4	Safe	Safe	Safe	Safe		Safe	Safe	Safe	Safe	Safe	Bottom 4	Safe	Safe		30th																
Shahid Hinton	Safe	Safe	Safe	Safe	Safe		Safe	Safe	Safe	Safe		Safe	Safe	Safe	Safe	Safe	Safe	Safe		Safe	Safe	Safe	Safe	Safe	Safe		Safe	Safe	Safe	Safe	Safe	Safe	Safe	Team Red	31st																	
Rob Morales	Safe	Safe	Safe	Safe	Safe		Safe	Safe	Safe	Safe		Safe	Safe	Safe	Safe	Safe	Safe	Safe		Safe	Safe	Safe	Bottom 2	Safe	Safe		Safe	Safe	Safe	Safe	Safe	Safe	Safe	Team Red	32nd																	
Kelley Thrasher	Safe	Safe	Safe	Safe	Safe		Safe	Safe	Safe	Safe		Safe	Safe	Safe	Safe	Safe	Safe	Safe		Safe	Safe	Safe	Safe	Bottom 4	Safe		Safe	Safe	Safe	Safe	Safe	Safe	Bottom 2	Team Red	33rd																	
Jeanet Stephenson	Safe	Safe	Safe	Safe	Safe		Safe	Safe	Safe	Safe		Safe	Safe	Safe	Safe	Safe	Safe	Safe		Safe	Safe	Safe	Safe	Safe	Safe		Safe	Safe	Safe	Safe	Safe	Safe	Safe	Team Red	34th																	
Javan Whitaker	Safe	Safe	Safe	Safe	Safe		Safe	Safe	Safe	Safe		Safe	Safe	Safe	Safe	Safe	Safe	Safe		Safe	Safe	Safe	Safe	Safe	Safe		Safe	Safe	Safe	Safe	Safe	Safe	Safe	Team Red	35th																	
Sue Voltz	Safe	Safe	Safe	Bottom 3	Safe		Safe	Safe	Safe	Safe		Safe	Safe	Safe	Safe	Bottom 3	Safe	Safe		Bottom 3	Safe	Safe	Safe	Safe	Safe		Bottom 4	Safe	Safe	Safe	Safe	Safe	36th																			
Kelly Voltz	Safe	Safe	Safe	Safe	Safe		Bottom 4	Safe	Safe	Safe		Safe	Bottom 3	Safe	Safe	Safe	Safe	Safe		Safe	Safe	Bottom 2	Safe	Safe	Safe		Bottom 3	Bottom 4	Safe	Safe	Safe	37th																				
David Gonzalez	Safe	Safe	Safe	Safe	Safe		Safe	Safe	Safe	Safe		Safe	Safe	Safe	Safe	Safe	Safe	Safe		Safe	Safe	Safe	Safe	Safe	Safe		Safe	Safe	Safe	Safe	38th																					
Adriel Ruiz	Safe	Safe	Safe	Safe	Safe		Safe	Safe	Safe	Safe		Safe	Safe	Safe	Safe	Safe	Safe	Safe		Safe	Safe	Safe	Safe	Safe	Safe		Safe	Safe	Safe	39th																						
Deb Frederick	Safe	Safe	Safe	Safe	Safe		Safe	Bottom 3	Safe	Safe		Safe	Safe	Safe	Safe	Safe	Safe	Safe		Safe	Safe	Safe	Safe	Safe	Safe		Safe	Safe	40th																							
Daya Betty	Safe	Safe	Safe	Safe	Safe		Safe	Safe	Safe	Safe		Safe	Safe	Safe	Safe	Safe	Safe	Safe		Safe	Safe	Safe	Safe	Safe	Safe		Safe	41st																								
Pierre Bacall	Safe	Safe	Safe	Safe	Safe		Safe	Safe	Safe	Safe		Safe	Safe	Safe	Safe	Safe	Safe	Safe		Safe	Bottom 3	Safe	Safe	Safe	Safe		42nd																									
Spencer Newman	Safe	Safe	Safe	Safe	Safe		Safe	Safe	Safe	Safe		Safe	Safe	Safe	Safe	Safe	Safe	Safe		Safe	Safe	Safe	Safe	Safe	Team Orange	43rd																										
Nikita Kodjak	Safe	Safe	Safe	Safe	Safe		Safe	Safe	Safe	Safe		Safe	Safe	Safe	Safe	Safe	Safe	Safe		Safe	Safe	Safe	Safe	Safe	Team Orange	44th																										
Niko	Safe	Safe	Safe	Safe	Safe		Safe	Safe	Safe	Safe		Safe	Safe	Safe	Safe	Safe	Safe	Safe		Safe	Safe	Safe	Safe	Safe	Team Orange	45th																										
LaMonica Birmingham	Safe	Safe	Safe	Safe	Safe		Safe	Safe	Safe	Safe		Safe	Safe	Safe	Safe	Safe	Safe	Safe		Bottom 2	Bottom 2	Safe	Safe	Safe	Team Orange	46th																										
Jess Yang	Safe	Safe	Safe	Safe	Safe		Safe	Safe	Safe	Safe		Safe	Bottom 4	Bottom 4	Safe	Safe	Safe	Safe		Safe	Safe	Safe	Safe	Safe	Team Orange	47th																										
Holden Heller	Safe	Safe	Safe	Safe	Safe		Safe	Safe	Safe	Safe		Safe	Safe	Safe	Safe	Safe	Safe	Safe		Safe	Safe	Safe	Safe	Safe	Team Orange	48th																										
Esther Janes	Safe	Safe	Safe	Safe	Safe		Safe	Safe	Safe	Safe		Safe	Safe	Safe	Safe	Safe	Safe	Safe		Safe	Safe	Safe	Safe	Safe	Team Orange	49th																										
Stefanie Burgett	Safe	Safe	Bottom 4	Safe	Safe		Safe	Safe	Safe	Safe		Safe	Safe	Safe	Safe	Safe	Safe	Safe		Safe	Safe	Safe	Safe	50th																												
Austin Xander Martin	Safe	Safe	Safe	Safe	Safe		Safe	Safe	Safe	Safe		Safe	Safe	Safe	Safe	Safe	Safe	Safe		Safe	Safe	Safe	51st																													
Camille Wilson	Safe	Safe	Safe	Safe	Safe		Safe	Safe	Bottom 5	Safe		Safe	Safe	Safe	Safe	Safe	Safe	Safe		Safe	Safe	52nd																														
Arun Kumar	Safe	Safe	Safe	Safe	Safe		Safe	Safe	Safe	Safe		Safe	Safe	Safe	Safe	Safe	Safe	Safe		Safe	53rd																															
DaQuendra "Quen"	Safe	Safe	Safe	Safe	Safe		Safe	Safe	Safe	Safe		Bottom 2	Safe	Safe	Safe	Safe	Safe	Safe		54th																																
Susan Noles	Safe	Safe	Safe	Safe	Safe		Safe	Safe	Safe	Safe		Safe	Safe	Safe	Bottom 3	Safe	Safe	Team Dark Green	55th																																	
Reece Heller	Safe	Safe	Safe	Safe	Safe		Safe	Safe	Safe	Safe		Safe	Safe	Safe	Safe	Safe	Safe	Team Dark Green	56th																																	
Nautica	Safe	Safe	Safe	Safe	Safe		Safe	Safe	Safe	Safe		Safe	Safe	Safe	Safe	Safe	Bottom 4	Team Dark Green	57th																																	
Michael Shields	Safe	Safe	Safe	Safe	Safe		Safe	Safe	Safe	Safe		Safe	Safe	Safe	Safe	Safe	Safe	Team Dark Green	58th																																	
Lisa Herrera	Safe	Safe	Safe	Safe	Safe		Safe	Safe	Safe	Safe		Safe	Safe	Safe	Safe	Bottom 2	Bottom 2	Team Dark Green	59th																																	
Lisa G	Safe	Safe	Safe	Safe	Safe		Safe	Safe	Safe	Safe		Bottom 3	Safe	Safe	Safe	Safe	Safe	Team Dark Green	60th																																	
Lambo	Safe	Safe	Safe	Safe	Safe		Safe	Safe	Safe	Safe		Safe	Safe	Safe	Safe	Safe	Safe	Team Dark Green	61st																																	
Jakala	Safe	Safe	Safe	Safe	Safe		Safe	Safe	Safe	Safe		Safe	Safe	Safe	Safe	Safe	Safe	Team Dark Green	62nd																																	
Braxx	Safe	Safe	Safe	Safe	Safe		Safe	Safe	Safe	Safe		Safe	Safe	Safe	Safe	Safe	Safe	Team Dark Green	63rd																																	
Cathy C.	Safe	Safe	Safe	Safe	Safe		Safe	Safe	Safe	Safe		Safe	Safe	Safe	Safe	Safe	64th																																			
Jean Stephenson	Safe	Safe	Safe	Safe	Safe		Safe	Safe	Safe	Safe		Safe	Safe	Safe	Safe	65th																																				
Jordan Heller	Safe	Bottom 2	Safe	Safe	Safe		Safe	Safe	Safe	Safe		Safe	Safe	Safe	66th																																					
Tiana	Safe	Bottom 3	Bottom 2	Safe	Safe		Safe	Safe	Safe	Safe		Safe	Safe	67th																																						
Karan Ashley	Safe	Safe	Safe	Safe	Safe		Safe	Safe	Bottom 4	Safe		Safe	Safe	68th																																						
Kevin Gonzalez	Safe	Safe	Safe	Safe	Safe		Safe	Safe	Safe	Safe		Safe	69th																																							
Paul Mount	Bottom 3	Safe	Safe	Bottom 4	Safe		Safe	Safe	Safe	Safe		70th																																								
Tristyn Kendall	Safe	Safe	Safe	Safe	Safe		Safe	Safe	Safe	Team Dark Green	71st																																									
Grandpa Rob	Safe	Safe	Safe	Safe	Safe		Safe	Safe	Safe	Team Dark Green	72nd																																									
Nate	Safe	Safe	Safe	Safe	Safe		Bottom 3	Safe	Safe	Team Dark Green	73rd																																									
Michael W.	Safe	Safe	Safe	Safe	Safe		Safe	Safe	Bottom 3	Team Dark Green	74th																																									
Dr. Limitless	Safe	Safe	Safe	Safe	Safe		Safe	Safe	Safe	Team Dark Green	75th																																									
Kayla	Safe	Safe	Safe	Safe	Safe		Safe	Safe	Safe	Team Dark Green	76th																																									
Jen Jendusa	Safe	Safe	Safe	Safe	Safe		Safe	Safe	Safe	Team Dark Green	77th																																									
Jason Lewis	Safe	Safe	Safe	Safe	Safe		Bottom 2	Safe	Safe	Team Dark Green	78th																																									
Elijah	Safe	Safe	Safe	Safe	Safe		Safe	Bottom 2	Safe	Team Dark Green	79th																																									
Dia Gilbert	Safe	Safe	Safe	Safe	Safe		Safe	Safe	Safe	Team Dark Green	80th																																									
Samantha	Safe	Safe	Safe	Safe	Safe		Safe	Safe	81st																																											
Summer	Safe	Safe	Bottom 3	Safe	Safe		Safe	82nd																																												
D'Mario	Safe	Safe	Safe	Safe	Safe		Safe	83rd																																												
Mel	Safe	Safe	Safe	Safe	Safe		84th																																													
Zach Janes	Safe	Safe	Safe	Safe	Team Purple	85th																																														
Sophie	Safe	Safe	Safe	Safe	Team Purple	86th																																														
Nomi Tref	Safe	Safe	Safe	Safe	Team Purple	87th																																														
Lauren Macaulay	Safe	Safe	Safe	Safe	Team Purple	88th																																														
Lauren Klem	Safe	Safe	Safe	Safe	Team Purple	89th																																														
Kelly W.	Safe	Safe	Safe	Safe	Team Purple	90th																																														
Jeanice Stephenson	Safe	Safe	Safe	Safe	Team Purple	91st																																														
Hannah	Safe	Safe	Safe	Safe	Team Purple	92nd																																														
Cathy	Safe	Safe	Safe	Safe	Team Purple	93rd																																														
John Youssef	Safe	Safe	Safe	Safe	Team Purple	94th																																														
Ashleigh	Safe	Safe	Safe	Safe	Team Purple	95th																																														
Alexis Pruitt	Safe	Safe	Safe	Safe	Team Purple	96th																																														
Serena Lange	Safe	Safe	Safe	97th																																																
Rawlins	Safe	Safe	98th																																																	
Debbie	Safe	99th																																																		
Dr. Kathy Waggoner	100th																																																			

== Game summary ==
=== Season 1 ===
Results (Season 1)
Episode		Final Players Left	Eliminated
#	Challenge	Final Players Left	Eliminated
1	Lei in a Balloon	Mariama, Geraldine	Janice
1	Blow the Whistle	Sandra, Arvind, Mariama	Tammy
1	Guess the Weight	Adam, Jared, Leo	Darlene
1	Pretty Penne	Adam, Sarah K.	Phil B.
1	Bucket Head Relay (Team/Elimination Heat)	—N/a	Aaron, Avery, Aviounce, Brady, Chaz, Frank, Marisa, Morgan, Myles, Sandra, Vicki, Yoshi
2	Find Your Name	Jake C., Michelle, Tori	Jason
2	Nut Stackers	Jared, Aggie	Agness
2	Potato Fork Catch (Pairs of 2/Division)	Dee, Geraldine, Stormm	Beth
2	Sound It Out (Team)	—N/a	Adam, Cole, Jeremiah, Jim, LaNette, Lindsey, Lizzie, Phil S., Sarah S.
2	Slingshot Balloon	Aggie, Preston, Anna	Jackie
3	Needle and Thread	Chris, Sean, Seth	Donnell
3	Gutter Bowl (Team)	—N/a	Aggie, Amber, Bethany, Johnny, Merna, Phillip, Zoltan
3	Hook a Duck	Ronald, Mario, Tommy	Dee
3	Disc Twerking	Anna	Justin
3	Tape Lunch Box	Mae, Jared, Mariama	Tori
4	Frozen Pants	Arvind, Sarah K., Stormm	LaVonne
4	Coin in a Glass	Cara Maria, Michelle, Miranda	Michaela
4	Tape Measure Retract	Jake P., Lance, Michelle	Sarah K.
4	Nail Balance	David A., Joann, Ronald	King David; J. Blake (withdrew)
4	Domino Run (Team)	—N/a	Arvind, Carla, Courtney, Gabe, Jordan, Richie, Robbie
5	Butterfly Catch	Mariama, Robert, Marsha	Lance
5	Balloon Cup Transfer	Malissa, Joann, Marsha	Sean
5	Piggy Bank Raid	Kara, Marsha, Danni	Julian
5	Boat Float (Team)	—N/a	Grant, Mae, Mariana, Michelle, Rebekah
5	Hang a Painting	James, Jennifer, Seth	Nikki
6	Find a Light	Geraldine, Leandra, Robert	Stormm
6	Cotton Spool	Seth	James
6	Bubble Wrapped	Cara Maria, Gianna, Hadieh	Collin
6	Tennis Ball Weave (Team/Captains)	—N/a	Jake P., Mario, Seth, Will
6	House of Cards	Carlene, Malissa, Marsha, Ronald	Robert
7	Land the Shot	Joann, Tabi	Miko
7	Suitcase Curling (Elimination Heat)	Ciara, David A., Gianna, Marsha, Miranda	Chris
7	Pencil Jump	Gianna, Marsha	David R.
7	Untangled (Team/Captains)	—N/a	Hadieh, Jake C., Joann, Luigi
7	Pop-Up Tent	Gianna, Marsha	Alex
8	Upturned Cups	Kara, Miranda, Carlene, Leo	Gianna
8	Spring Head	David A., Peter	Kevin
8	Sleeping Bag Race	Anna, Jennifer	Marsha
8	Traffic Cone Flip (Team/Captains)	—N/a	Anna, Cara Maria, Geraldine, Malissa
8	Arc the Ball	David A., Peter	Tabi
9	Ping Pong Obstacle Course (Team)	—N/a	Ciara, Dakota, David A., Kara, Tommy
9	Snatch the Hat	Carlene, Danni, Miranda	Jared
9	Candle Extinguisher	Jennifer, Leandra, Ronald	Leo
9	Balance See-Saw (Team/Division)	Carlene	Danni
9	Tower of Boxes	Jennifer, Miranda	Preston
10	Confetti Sweep	Miranda, Peter	Carlene
10	3D Puzzle	Leandra, Ronald	Miranda
10	Alphabetti Golf	Leandra, Peter	Ronald
10	Pendulum	Leandra, Peter	Jennifer
10	Grand Finale (Blow the Whistle, Nut Stackers, Domino Run)	Peter	Leandra

=== Season 2 ===
Results (Season 2)
Episode		Final Players Left	Eliminated
#	Challenge	Final Players Left	Eliminated
1	Ball Drop	David H., Paul	Kathy W.
1	A Hand Full	Jordan, Tiana	Debbie
1	Squat a Duck	Stefanie, Summer, Tiana	Rawlins
1	Nut Slide	Luke, Paul, Sue	Serena
1	Ready to Pop (Team/Elimination Heat)	—N/a	Alexis, Ashleigh, Cathy J., Hannah, Jeanice, Johnny, Kelly W., Lauren K., Lauren M., Nomi, Sophie, Zach J.
2	Unboxed	Jason L., Kelly V., Nate	Mel
2	Column of Cans	Deb, Elijah, Shant	D'Mario; Summer (withdrew)
2	Weigh to Go	Brandon, Michael W., Karan, Camille	Sam
2	Chain Reaction (Team)	—N/a	Dia, Dr. Limitless, Elijah, Grandpa Rob, Jason L., Jen, Kayla, Michael W., Nate, Tristyn
2	Slam Dunk	Lisa G., Quen	Paul
3	Pick a Flower	David B., Jess, Kelly V.	Kevin
3	Cold Hearted	Dakota, Jess	Karan, Tiana
3	On the Edge	Gerry, Susan	Jordan
3	Measuring Up	Lisa H., Sue	Jean
3	Hands Off	Jacoby, Lisa H., Nautica	Cathy C.
4	Tangled Up (Team)	—N/a	Braxx, Jakala, Lambo, Lisa G., Lisa H., Mike, Nautica, Reece, Susan
4	Ball Balance	LaMonica, Raquel, Sue	Quen
4	No Mean Feet	LaMonica, Pierre, Shant	Arun
4	Pizza Stack	Kelly V.	Camille
4	Piggy Bank Roll	Ashley, Rob, Quinn	Xander
5	Head Catch	Kelley T., Quinn, Tony	Stefanie
5	Sponge Race (Team)	—N/a	Esther, Holden, Jess, LaMonica, Nikita, Niko, Spencer
5	Clowning Around	Brian, Kelly V., Sue	Pierre
5	Target Practice	Diana, Gabby, Kelly V.	Daya
5	Thimble Tower	Brian, Gerry	Deb
6	Fish Fling	Ashley, David B., Sage	Adriel
6	Rope Wrangle	Jason G.	David G.
6	Color Match	Ben, Sage, Shant	Kelly V.
6	Tea Cup Balance	Kelley T., Quinn	Sue
6	Water Balloon Weave (Team)	—N/a	Javan, Jeanet, Kelley T., Rob, Shahid
7	Ball Party	Adam, Brian, Gerry	Shant
7	Domino Balance	Quinn, Tony	Brian
7	Power Up (Team)	—N/a	Brandon, David H., EP, Jean-Paul
7	Spaced Out	Ashley, Diner, Luke	Raquel
7	Car Tire Bowling	Ashley, Zac	Lauren S.
8	Excess Baggage	Dakota, Diana, Jacoby, Kellie	Quinn
8	Defrost	Diana, Kellie	David B.
8	Leg Thrower	Ashley, Dakota, Diana	Gabby
8	Blind Luck	Diana, Kyle, Zac	Dakota
8	Cut the Tension	—N/a	Ashley, Diner, Gerry, Jason G., Kourtney, Luke

== Production ==
On May 12, 2025, it was announced that Fox had ordered the series with Ken Jeong and Erin Andrews as the hosts. On July 14, 2025, it was announced that the series would premiere on September 24, 2025, with a preview episode airing after the NFL on Fox on September 21.

On May 11, 2026, the series was renewed for a second season which premiered on September 23, 2026.

== Episodes ==
=== Series overview ===
Season	Contestants	Episodes	Originally released		Winner	Runner-up
Season	Contestants	Episodes	First released	Last released	Winner	Runner-up
1	100	10	September 21, 2025	December 10, 2025	Peter Nevins	Leandra Snyder
2	100	10	September 23, 2026	December 9, 2026	TBA	TBA

=== Season 1 (2025) ===
No. overall	No. in season	Title	Original release date	Prod. code	U.S. viewers (millions)	Rating (18-49)
1	1	"Don't Finish Last"	September 21, 2025	NTB-101	3.12	0.8
Episode 1 Results: Challenges played (5): 1. Lei in a Balloon ($10,000); 1. (Last three players: Mariama vs. Janice vs. Geraldine); 2. (Last two players: Janice vs. Geraldine); 2. Blow the Whistle ($20,000); 1. (Last four players: Tammy vs. Sandra vs. Arvind vs. Mariama); 2. (Last three players: Tammy vs. Arvind vs. Mariama); 3. (Last two players: Tammy vs. Arvind); 3. Guess the Weight ($30,000); 1. (Last four players: Adam, Jared, Leo, Darlene); 4. Pretty Penne ($40,000); 1. (Last three players: Phil B. vs. Adam vs. Sarah K.); 2. (Last two players: Phil B. vs. Sarah K.); 5. Bucket Head Relay ($160,000); 1. (Last two teams: Yellow Team vs. Purple Team)
2	2	"This is NUTS!"	October 1, 2025	NTB-102	1.76	0.2
Episode 2 Results: Challenges played (5): 1. Find Your Name ($170,000); 1. (Last four players: Jake C. vs. Michelle vs. Tori vs. Jason); 2. (Last three players: Jake C. vs. Michelle vs. Jason); 3. (Last two players: Michelle vs. Jason); 2. Nut Stackers ($180,000); 1. (Last three players: Agness vs. Jared vs. Aggie); 2. (Last two players: Agness vs. Aggie); 3. Potato Fork Catch ($190,000); 1. (Last three pairs: Beth & Dee vs. Stormm & Geraldine vs. Seth & Kara); 2. (Last four players: Beth vs. Dee vs. Geraldine vs. Stormm); 3. (Last three players: Beth vs. Dee vs. Stormm); 4. (Last two players: Beth vs. Stormm); 4. Sound It Out ($280,000); 1. (Last two teams: Team Steel Pan vs. Team Ukulele); 5. Slingshot Balloon ($290,000); 1. (Last four players: Aggie vs. Preston vs. Anna vs. Jackie); 2. (Last three players: Aggie vs. Anna vs. Jackie); 3. (Last two players: Aggie vs. Jackie)
3	3	"Families Torn Apart"	October 8, 2025	NTB-103	1.70	0.2
Episode 3 Results: Challenges played (5): 1. Needle and Thread ($300,000); 1. (Last four players: Chris vs. Sean vs. Donnell vs. Seth); 2. (Last three players: Sean vs. Donnell vs. Seth); 3. (Last two players: Donnell vs. Seth); 2. Gutter Bowl ($370,000); 1. (Last two teams: Team Orange vs. Team Green); 3. Hook a Duck ($380,000); 1. (Last four players: Ronald vs. Mario vs. Dee vs. Tommy); 2. (Last three players: Mario vs. Dee vs. Tommy); 3. (Last two players: Dee vs. Tommy); 4. Disc Twerking ($390,000); 1. (Last four pairs: James & Arvind vs. Mariama & Geraldine vs. Justin & Anna vs. Will & Gabe); 2. (Last three pairs: Mariama & Geraldine vs. Justin & Anna vs. Will & Gabe); 3. (Last two pairs: Justin & Anna vs. Will & Gabe); 4. (Last two players: Anna vs. Justin); 5. Tape Lunch Box ($400,000); 1. (Last four players: Mae vs. Jared vs. Tori vs. Mariama); 2. (Last three players: Jared vs. Tori vs. Mariama); 3. (Last two players: Tori vs. Mariama)
4	4	"A Queen is Born"	October 15, 2025	NTB-104	1.75	0.2
Episode 4 Results: Challenges played (5): 1. Frozen Pants ($410,000); 1. (Last four players: Arvind vs. LaVonne vs. Sarah K. vs. Stormm); 2. (Last three players: LaVonne vs. Sarah K. vs. Stormm); 3. (Last two players: LaVonne vs. Stormm); 2. Coin in a Glass ($420,000); 1. (Last four players: Cara Maria vs. Michaela vs. Michelle vs. Miranda); 2. (Three way tie: Michaela vs. Michelle vs. Miranda); 3. (Last three players: Michaela vs. Michelle vs. Miranda); 4. (Last two players: Michaela vs. Michelle); 3. Tape Measure Retract ($430,000); 1. (Last four players: Jake P. vs. Lance vs. Michelle vs. Sarah K.); 2. (Last three players: Lance vs. Michelle vs. Sarah K.); 3. (Last two players: Michelle vs. Sarah K.); 4. Nail Balance ($440,000), (Player withdrawn; $450,000); 1. (Last four players: David A. vs. Joann vs. King David vs. Ronald); 2. (Last three players: David A. vs. Joann vs. King David); 3. (Last two players: Joann vs. King David); 4. (Withdrawn player: J. Blake); 5. Domino Run ($520,000); 1. (Last three teams: Team Purple vs Team Silver vs. Team White); 2. (Last two teams: Team Purple vs. Team White)
5	5	"Who Framed Ken & Erin?"	October 22, 2025	NTB-105	1.67	0.2
Episode 5 Results: Challenges played (5): 1. Butterfly Catch ($530,000); 1. (Last four players: Mariama vs. Lance vs. Robert vs. Marsha); 2. (Last three players: Lance vs. Robert vs. Marsha); 3. (Last two players: Lance vs. Marsha); 2. Balloon Cup Transfer ($540,000); 1. (Last four players: Malissa vs. Sean vs. Joann vs. Marsha); 2. (Last three players: Malissa vs. Sean vs. Joann); 3. (Last two players: Malissa vs. Sean); 3. Piggy Bank Raid ($550,000); 1. (Last four players: Kara vs. Marsha vs. Julian vs. Danni); 2. (Last three players: Marsha vs. Julian vs. Danni); 3. (Last two players: Julian vs. Danni); 4. Boat Float ($600,000); 1. (First three teams): 1. (Last three teams: Team Leo vs. Team Gianna vs. Jake C.); 2. (Last two teams: Team Leo vs. Team Gianna); 2. (Second three teams): 1. (Last three teams: Team Miranda vs. Team Ronald vs. Jake P.); 2. (Last two teams: Team Ronald vs. Jake P.); 3. (Third three teams): 1. (Last three teams: Team Michelle vs. Team Preston vs. Mario); 2. (Last two teams: Team Michelle vs. Team Mario); 4. (Elimination three teams): 1. (Last three teams: Team Michelle vs. Team Gianna vs. Jake P.); 2. (Last two teams: Team Michelle vs. Jake P.); 5. Hang a Painting ($610,000); 1. (Last four players: Nikki vs. James vs. Jennifer vs. Seth); 2. (Last three players: Nikki vs. Jennifer vs. Seth); 3. (Last two players: Nikki vs. Jennifer)
6	6	"Love Is In The Air"	November 5, 2025	NTB-106	1.66	0.2
Episode 6 Results: Challenges played (5): 1. Find a Light ($620,000); 1. (Last four players: Geraldine vs. Leandra vs. Robert vs. Stormm); 2. (Last three players: Geraldine vs. Robert vs. Stormm); 3. (Last two players: Geraldine vs. Stormm); 2. Cotton Spool ($630,000); 1. (Last two players: Seth vs. James); 3. Bubble Wrapped ($640,000); 1. (Last four players: Cara Maria vs. Collin vs. Gianna vs. Hadieh); 2. (Last three players: Cara Maria vs. Collin vs. Gianna); 3. (Last two players: Collin vs. Gianna); 4. Tennis Ball Weave ($680,000); 1. (Last six teams: Team Leo vs. Team Leandra vs. Team Jared vs. Team Joann vs. Team Ronald vs. Team Will); 2. (Last five teams: Team Leo vs. Team Jared vs. Team Joann vs. Team Ronald vs. Team Will); 3. (Last four teams: Team Leo vs. Team Jared vs. Team Joann vs. Team Will); 4. (Last three teams: Team Leo vs. Team Jared vs. Team Will); 5. (Last two teams: Team Leo vs. Team Will); 5. House of Cards ($690,000); 1. (Last five players: Malissa vs. Ronald vs. Marsha vs. Robert vs. Carlene); 2. (Last four players: Ronald vs. Marsha vs. Robert vs. Carlene); 3. (Last three players: Ronald vs. Marsha vs. Robert); 4. (Last two players: Ronald vs. Robert)
7	7	"The Upset of the Season"	November 12, 2025	NTB-107	1.71	0.3
Episode 7 Results: Challenges played (5): 1. Land the Shot ($700,000); 1. (Last three players: Miko vs. Joann vs. Tabi); 2. (Last two players: Miko vs. Joann); 2. Suitcase Curling ($710,000); 1. (Last six players: Marsha, Ciara, Miranda, Chris, David A., Gianna); 3. Pencil Jump ($720,000); 1. (Last three players: Marsha vs. Gianna vs. David R.); 2. (Last two players: Gianna vs. David R.); 4. Untangled ($760,000); 1. (Last three teams: Team Ronald vs. Team Luigi vs. Team Tommy); 2. (Last two teams: Team Ronald vs. Team Luigi); 5. Pop-Up Tent ($770,000); 1. (Last three players: Marsha vs. Gianna vs. Alex); 2. (Last two players: Gianna vs. Alex)
8	8	"Flipping Out!"	November 19, 2025	NTB-108	1.52	0.2
Episode 8 Results: Challenges played (5): 1. Upturned Cups ($780,000); 1. (Last five players: Kara vs. Miranda vs. Leo vs. Carlene vs. Gianna); 2. (Last four players: Kara vs. Miranda vs. Carlene vs. Gianna); 3. (Last three players: Kara vs. Miranda vs. Gianna); 4. (Last two players: Kara vs. Gianna); 2. Spring Head ($790,000); 1. (Last four players: Peter vs. David A. vs. Anna vs. Kevin); 2. (Last three players: Peter vs. David A. vs. Kevin); 3. (Last two players: Peter vs. Kevin); 3. Sleeping Bag Race ($800,000); 1. (Last four players: Marsha vs. Anna vs. Ronald vs. Jennifer); 2. (Last three players: Marsha vs. Anna vs. Jennifer); 3. (Last two players: Marsha vs. Jennifer); 4. Traffic Cone Flip ($840,000); 1. (Last five teams: Team Orange vs. Team Blue vs. Team Green vs. Team Pink vs. Team Yellow); 2. (Last four teams: Team Blue vs. Team Green vs. Team Pink vs. Team Yellow); 3. (Last three teams: Team Green vs. Team Pink vs. Team Yellow); 4. (Last two teams: Team Pink vs. Team Yellow); 5. Arc the Ball ($850,000); 1. (Last four players: Peter vs. Leandra vs. Tabi vs. David A.); 2. (Last three players: Peter vs. Tabi vs. David A.); 3. (Last two players: Peter vs. Tabi)
9	9	"The Holidays Are Coming"	December 3, 2025	NTB-109	1.68	0.2
Episode 9 Results: Challenges played (5): 1. Ping Pong Obstacle Course ($900,000); 1. (Last three teams: Team Red vs. Team Yellow vs. Team Orange); 2. (Last two teams: Team Red vs. Team Yellow); 2. Snatch the Hat ($910,000); 1. (Last four players: Carlene vs. Jared vs. Miranda vs. Danni); 2. (Last three players: Jared vs. Miranda vs. Danni); 3. (Last two players: Jared vs. Danni); 3. Candle Extinguisher ($920,000); 1. (Last four players: Leo vs. Ronald vs. Leandra vs. Jennifer); 2. (Last three players: Leo vs. Leandra vs. Jennifer); 3. (Last two players: Leo vs. Jennifer); 4. Balance See Saw ($930,000); 1. (First two teams): 1. (Last two teams: Team Gold (Miranda, Jennifer, Ronald, Leandra) vs. Team Red (Preston, Peter, Carlene, Danni); 2. (Second two teams): 1. (Last two teams: Team Gold (Carlene, Danni) vs. Team Red (Peter, Preston); 3. (Last two players: Carlene vs. Danni); 5. Tower of Boxes ($940,000); 1. (Last three players: Jennifer vs. Preston vs. Miranda); 2. (Last two players: Preston vs. Miranda)
10	10	"Million Dollar Winner"	December 10, 2025	NTB-110	1.96	0.2
Episode 10 Results: Challenges played (5): 1. Confetti Sweep ($950,000); 1. (Last three players: Peter vs. Miranda vs. Carlene); 2. (Last two players: Miranda vs. Carlene); 2. 3D Puzzle ($960,000); 1. (Last three players: Leandra vs. Miranda vs. Ronald); 2. (Last two players: Miranda vs. Ronald); 3. Alphabetti Golf ($970,000); 1. (Last three players: Leandra vs. Peter vs. Ronald); 2. (Last two players: Leandra vs. Ronald); 4. Pendulum ($980,000); 1. (Last three players: Jennifer vs. Peter vs. Leandra); 2. (Last two players: Jennifer vs. Leandra); 5. Grand Finale ($1,000,000); 1. (Last two players: Leandra vs. Peter); Season Winner: Peter

=== Season 2 (2026) ===
No. overall	No. in season	Title	Original release date	Prod. code	U.S. viewers (millions)	Rating (18-49)
11	1	"Premiere: Do You Believe in Miracles?"	September 23, 2026	NTB-201	1.37	0.20
Episode 1 Results: Challenges played (5): 1. Ball Drop ($10,000); 1. (Last three players: David H. vs. Kathy W. vs. Paul); 2. (Last two players: David H. vs. Kathy W.); 2. A Hand Full ($20,000); 1. (Last three players: Debbie vs. Jordan vs. Tiana); 2. (Last two players: Debbie vs. Jordan); 3. Squat a Duck ($30,000); 1. (Last four players: Stefanie vs. Summer vs. Tiana vs. Rawlins); 2. (Last three players: Summer vs. Tiana vs. Rawlins); 3. (Last two players: Tiana vs. Rawlins); 4. Nut Slide ($40,000); 1. (Last four players: Luke vs. Paul vs. Serena vs. Sue); 2. (Last three players: Luke vs. Serena vs. Sue); 3. (Last two players: Luke vs. Serena); 5. Ready to Pop ($160,000); 1. (Last two teams: Team Purple vs. Team Red)
12	2	"The Gloves are off!"	September 30, 2026	NTB-202	1.95	0.2/1
Episode 2 Results: Challenges played (5): 1. Unboxed ($170,000); 1. (Last four players: Jason L. vs. Kelly V. vs. Mel vs. Nate); 2. (Last three players: Jason L. vs. Mel vs. Nate); 3. (Last two players: Jason L. vs. Mel); 2. Column of Cans ($180,000), (Player withdrawn; $190,000); 1. (Last four players: Deb vs. D'Mario vs. Elijah vs. Shant); 2. (Last three players: Deb vs. D'Mario vs. Elijah); 3. (Last two players: D'Mario vs. Elijah); 4. (Withdrawn player: Summer); 3. Weigh to Go ($200,000); 1. (Last five players: Brandon vs. Michael W. vs. Karan vs. Sam vs. Camille); 4. Chain Reaction ($300,000); 1. (Last two teams: Team Blue vs. Team Dark Green); 5. Slam Dunk ($310,000); 1. (Last three players: Lisa G. vs. Paul vs. Quen); 2. (Last two players: Paul vs. Quen)
13	3	"Families on the Edge"	October 7, 2026	NTB-203	1.56	0.20
Episode 3 Results: Challenges played (5): 1. Pick a Flower ($320,000); 1. (Last four players: David B. vs. Jess vs. Kelly V. vs. Kevin); 2. (Last three players: David B. vs. Kelly V. vs. Kevin); 3. (Last two players: David B. vs. Kevin); 2. Cold Hearted ($340,000); 1. (Last two pairs: Dakota & Jess vs. Karan & Tiana); 3. On the Edge ($350,000); 1. (Last three players: Gerry vs. Jordan vs. Susan); 2. (Last two players: Gerry vs. Jordan); 4. Measuring Up ($360,000); 1. (Last three players: Jean vs. Lisa H. vs. Sue); 2. (Last two players: Jean vs. Lisa H.); 5. Hands Off ($370,000); 1. (Last four players: Cathy C. vs. Jacoby vs. Lisa H. vs. Nautica); 2. (Last three players: Cathy C. vs. Jacoby vs. Lisa H.); 3. (Last two players: Cathy C. vs. Lisa H.)
14	4	"It's All About the Balance"	October 14, 2026	NTB-204	1.57	0.2/2
Episode 4 Results: Challenges played (5): 1. Tangled Up ($460,000); 1. (Last two teams: Team Dark Green vs. Team Yellow); 2. Ball Balance ($470,000); 1. (Last four players: LaMonica vs. Quen vs. Raquel vs. Sue); 2. (Last three players: LaMonica vs. Quen vs. Sue); 3. (Last two players: LaMonica vs. Quen); 3. No Mean Feet ($480,000); 1. (Last four players: Arun vs. LaMonica vs. Pierre vs. Shant); 2. (Last three players: Arun vs. LaMonica vs. Pierre); 3. (Last two players: Arun vs. LaMonica); 4. Pizza Stack ($490,000); 1. (Last four pairs: Ashley & Gerry vs. Camille & Kelly V. vs. David H. & Sue vs. Kelley T. & Raquel); 2. (Last three pairs: Ashley & Gerry vs. Camille & Kelly V. vs. Kelley T. & Raquel); 3. (Last two pairs: Camille & Kelly V. vs. Kelley T. & Raquel); 4. (Last two players: Camille vs. Kelly V.); 5. Piggy Bank Roll ($500,000); 1. (Last four players: Ashley vs. Rob vs. Quinn vs. Xander); 2. (Last three players: Rob vs. Quinn vs. Xander); 3. (Last two players: Rob vs. Xander)
15	5	"50 Down, 50 to Go!"	October 21, 2026	NTB-205	1.58	0.1/9
Episode 5 Results: Challenges played (5): 1. Head Catch ($510,000); 1. (Last four players: Kelley T. vs. Quinn vs. Stefanie vs. Tony); 2. (Last three players: Quinn vs. Stefanie vs. Tony); 3. (Last two players: Quinn vs. Stefanie); 2. Sponge Race ($580,000); 1. (Last four teams: Team Orange vs. Team Purple vs. Team Blue vs. Team Red); 2. (Last three teams: Team Orange vs. Team Purple vs. Team Blue); 3. (Last two teams: Team Orange vs. Team Blue); 3. Clowning Around ($590,000); 1. (Last four players: Brian vs. Kelly V. vs. Pierre vs. Sue); 2. (Last three players: Brian vs. Kelly V. vs. Pierre); 3. (Last two players: Brian vs. Pierre); 4. Target Practice ($600,000); 1. (Last four players: Daya vs. Diana vs. Gabby vs. Kelly V.); 2. (Last three players: Daya vs. Diana vs. Gabby); 3. (Last two players: Daya vs. Gabby); 5. Thimble Tower ($610,000); 1. (Last three players: Brian vs. Deb vs. Gerry); 2. (Last two players: Deb vs. Gerry)
16	6	"Teams and Teacups"	November 4, 2026	NTB-206	1.56	0.2/3
Episode 6 Results: Challenges played (5): 1. Fish Fling ($620,000); 1. (Last four players: Adriel vs. Ashley vs. David B. vs. Sage); 2. (Last three players: Adriel vs. Ashley vs. David B.); 3. (Last two players: Adriel vs. David B.); 2. Rope Wrangle ($630,000); 1. (Last four pairs: Adam & Dakota vs. Ashley & Jeanet vs. David G. & Jason G. vs. Rob & Kelly V.); 2. (Last three pairs: Adam & Dakota vs. David G. & Jason G. vs. Rob & Kelly V.); 3. (Last two pairs: David G. & Jason G. vs. Rob & Kelly V.); 4. (Last two players: David G. vs. Jason G.); 3. Color Match ($640,000); 1. (Last four players: Ben vs. Kelly V. vs. Sage vs. Shant); 2. (Last three players: Ben vs. Kelly V. vs. Sage); 3. (Last two players: Ben vs. Kelly V.); 4. Tea Cup Balance ($650,000); 1. (Last three players: Kelley T. vs. Quinn vs. Sue); 2. (Last two players: Kelley T. vs. Sue); 5. Water Balloon Weave ($700,000); 1. (Last three teams: Team Red vs. Team Orange vs. Team Purple); 2. (Last two teams: Team Red vs. Team Purple)
17	7	"Meet the Galliance"	November 11, 2026	NTB-207	1.64	0.20
Episode 7 Results: Challenges played (5): 1. Ball Party ($710,000); 1. (Last four players: Adam vs. Brian vs. Gerry vs. Shant); 2. (Last three players: Brian vs. Gerry vs. Shant); 3. (Last two players: Brian vs. Shant); 2. Domino Balance ($720,000); 1. (Last three players: Brian vs. Quinn vs. Tony); 2. (Last two players: Quinn vs. Brian ) 3. Power Up ($760,000); 1. (Last three teams: Team Yellow vs. Team Pink vs. Team Purple); 2. (Last two teams: Team Pink vs. Team Purple); 4. Spaced Out ($770,000); 1. (Last four players: Ashley vs. Diner vs. Luke vs. Raquel); 2. (Last three players: Diner vs. Luke vs. Raquel); 3. (Last two players: Luke vs. Raquel); 5. Car Tire Bowling ($780,000); 1. (Last three players: Ashley vs. Lauren S. vs. Zac); 2. (Last two players: Lauren S. vs. Zac)
18	8	"Friends or Foes?"	November 18, 2026	NTB-208	1.51	0.2/1
Episode 8 Results: Challenges played (5): 1. Excess Baggage ($790,000); 1. (Last five players: Dakota vs. Diana vs. Jacoby vs. Kellie vs. Quinn); 2. (Last four players: Dakota vs. Jacoby vs. Kellie vs. Quinn); 3. (Last three players: Dakota vs. Jacoby vs. Quinn); 4. (Last two players: Jacoby vs. Quinn); 2. Defrost ($800,000); 1. (Last three players: David B. vs. Diana vs. Kellie); 2. (Last two players: David B. vs. Kellie); 3. Leg Thrower ($810,000); 1. (Last four players: Ashley vs. Dakota vs. Diana vs. Gabby); 2. (Last three players: Ashley vs. Dakota vs. Gabby); 3. (Last two players: Dakota vs. Gabby); 4. Blind Luck ($820,000); 1. (Last four players: Dakota vs. Diana vs. Kyle vs. Zac); 2. (Last three players: Dakota vs. Kyle vs. Zac); 3. (Last two players: Dakota vs. Kyle); 5. Cut the Tension ($880,000); 1. (Last three teams: Team Blue vs. Team Pink vs. Team Purple); 2. (Last two teams: Team Blue vs. Team Purple)

== Reception ==
=== Critical response ===
The first season of 99 to Beat averaged 0.28 in the 18–49 demographic rating and approximately 1.85 million viewers across its ten-episode run, making it one of Fox's top-rated unscripted series of the 2025–26 season. The second season is scheduled to air on Wednesday nights.
