= Crystal Methyd =

American drag performer (born 1991)

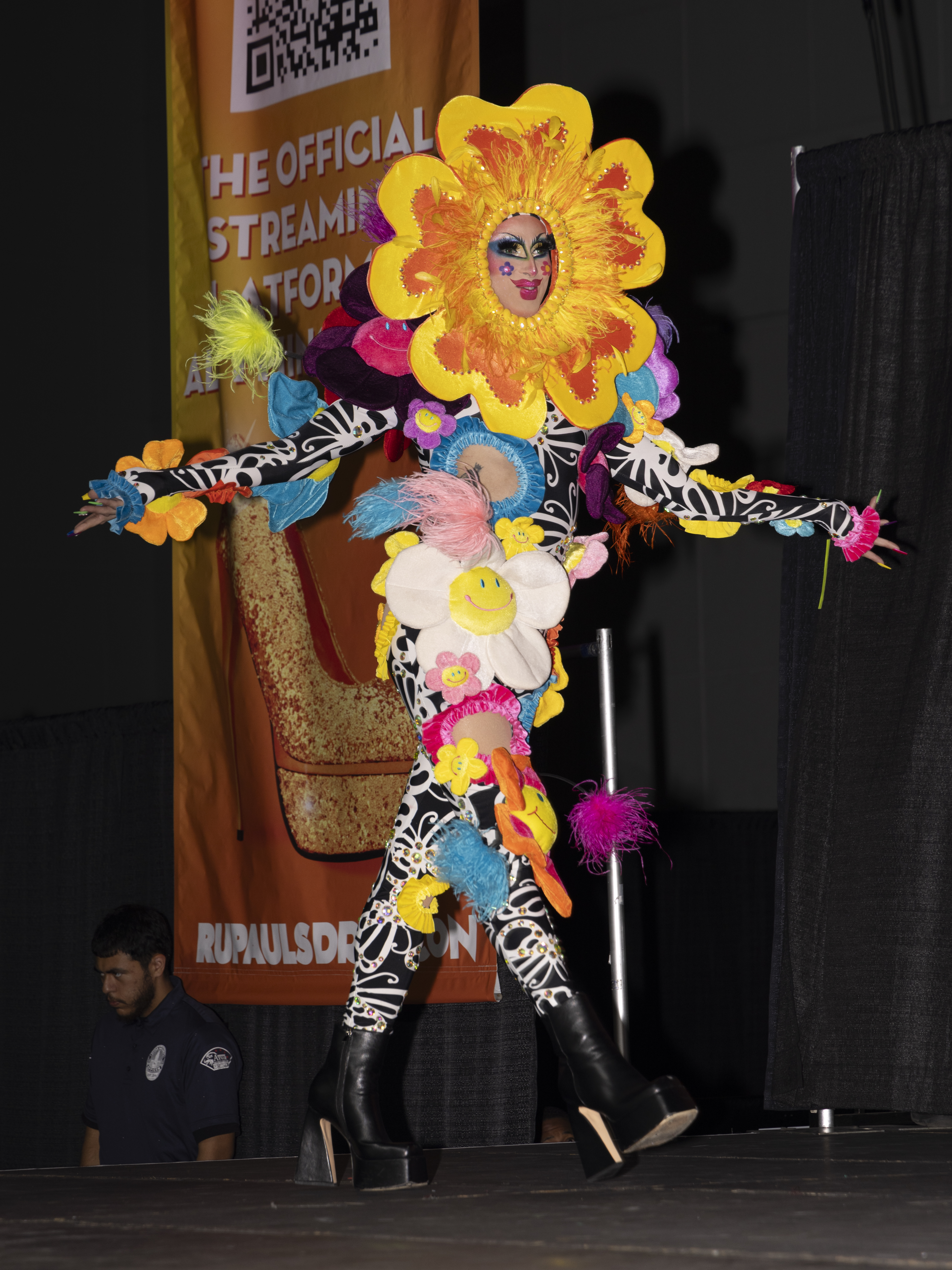
- Crystal Methyd at RuPaul's DragCon, 2024
- Born: Cody Harness; April 16, 1991 (age 35); San Jose, California, U.S.
- Education: Missouri State University (BA)
- Occupation: Drag queen
- Years active: 2015–present
- Television: RuPaul's Drag Race (season 12 and All Stars 11)
- Website: crystalmethyd.com

Crystal Methyd (born 16 April 1991) is the stage name of Cody Harness, an American drag performer who competed on the twelfth season of RuPaul's Drag Race and went on to win the eleventh season of RuPaul's Drag Race All Stars.

== Early life and education ==
Harness was born on April 16, 1991, in San Jose, California to a Mexican mother and American father. He grew up Catholic. At age 5, his family moved to Springfield, Missouri, to be closer to his dad's parents, and is where he became an Eagle Scout. Harness attended Missouri State University, and first performed in drag at Springfield PrideFest in 2015. He has recalled, "I was practicing my makeup in my room for about a month before I performed. I had a lot of fun, and people told me I looked different, and I liked that."

== Career ==
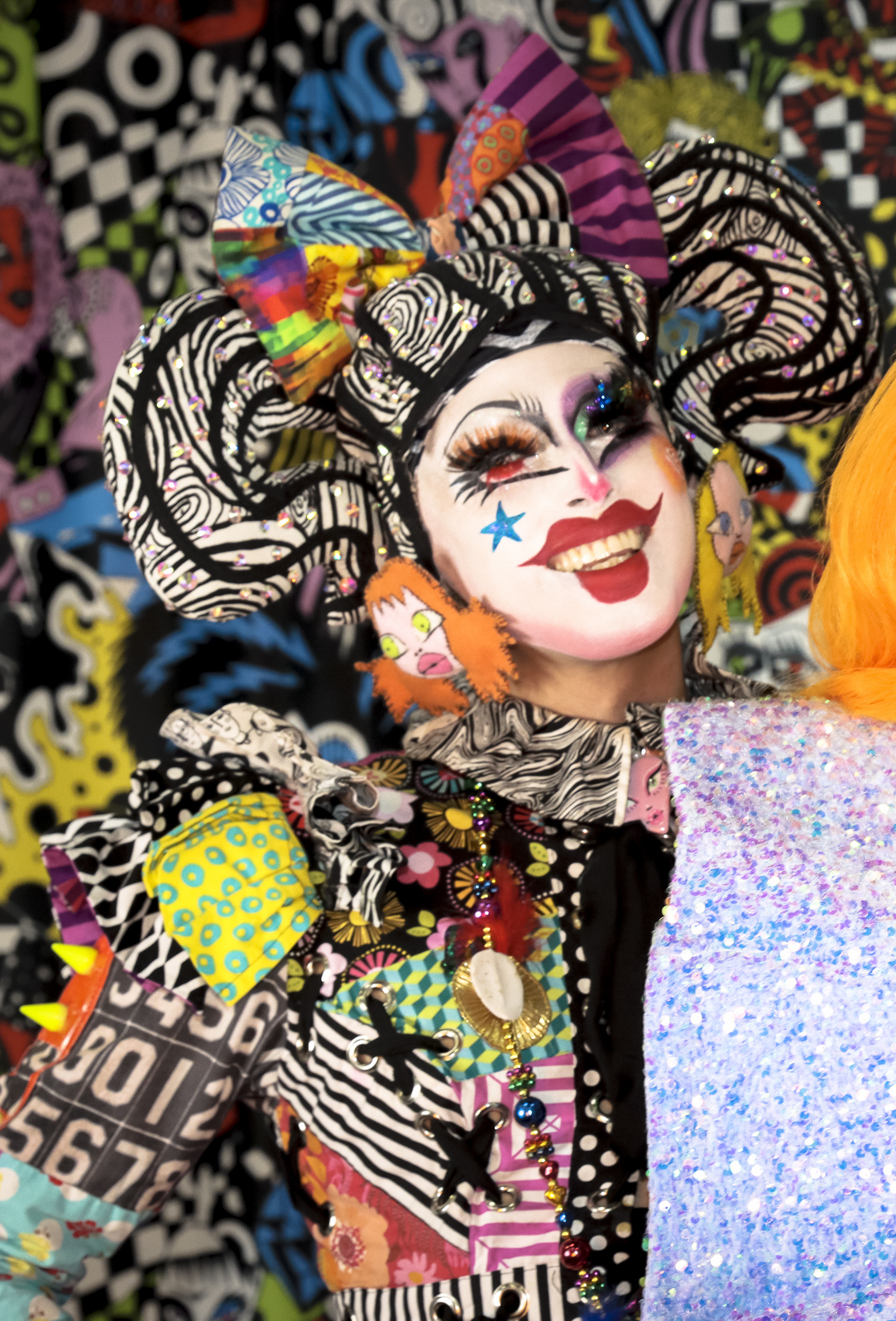
Crystal Methyd at RuPaul's DragCon LA, 2022

Harness's drag persona is Crystal Methyd. Crystal Methyd launched the monthly drag show "Get Dusted" at Springfield, Missouri's Outland Ballroom, and partnered with a local restaurant owner to host the city's first drag brunch in 2017. In addition to hosting "Get Dusted", which Bernardo Sim of Screen Rant said "has reenergized the drag scene in Springfield" and features "drag performers of all gender expressions and sexual orientations ... including straight cis men", Crystal Methyd helped performers with their makeup.

In 2020, Crystal Methyd competed on the twelfth season of RuPaul's Drag Race. Bustle's Kayla Blanton called her the "dark horse of the season", and MTV's Christopher Rudolph named her the "kookiest" of the contestants. Daniel Reynolds of The Advocate said she had a "kooky charm" and described her lip sync to Nelly Furtado's "I'm Like a Bird" during the finale as "unforgettable". The Houston Chronicle's Joey Guerra wrote, "The kooky queen with a mullet was a sharp contrast to much of her Season 12 competition. She struggled at first, unsure of how to fit her persona into the show's mechanics. But when she stopped trying, she soared and learned to shape each challenge to fit her." Michael Cook of South Florida Gay News said "her now-iconic runway looks were nothing to laugh at; this queen is one of a kind". Her parents and Spanish-speaking grandmother appeared on the finale. Jaida Essence Hall won season 12, with Crystal Methyd and Gigi Goode as the runners-up.

In September 2021, Crystal Methyd embarked on "Crystal & Jujubee's Wonderland Euro Tour," her first international tour with fellow drag race alum Jujubee, performing in 7 different cities across Europe. In 2024 Crystal Methyd starred as Bella Da Boys in the Tubi horror comedy film Slay, alongside fellow Drag Race alumni Cara Melle, Heidi N Closet and Trinity the Tuck. In April 2026, Crystal Methyd was announced to be competing on the eleventh season of RuPaul's Drag Race All Stars in the second bracket. She is the sole representative of Drag Race's twelfth season in the competition.

== Personal life ==
Harness lives in Springfield, Missouri, as of 2020. He has a tattoo of "One Direction" in Arabic on his chest.

Crystal Methyd is the "drag mother" of RuPaul's Drag Race season 14 contestant Daya Betty.

== Filmography ==
=== Film ===
Year	Title	Role	Notes
2024	Slay	Bella Da Boys	Main role

=== Television ===
Year	Title	Role	Notes
2020	RuPaul's Drag Race (season 12)	Herself	Runner-up
2020	RuPaul's Drag Race: Untucked	Herself	Runner-up
2026	RuPaul's Drag Race All Stars (season 11)	Herself	Winner

=== Music videos ===
Year	Title	Artist(s)	Ref.
2020	"Cum"	Brooke Candy ft. Iggy Azalea	

=== Web series ===
Year	Title	Role	Notes	Ref
2020	Whatcha Packin'	Herself	Guest	
2020	Countdown to the Crown	Herself	Guest	
2020	Bring Back My Ghouls	Herself	Guest	
2022	Bring Back My Girls	Herself	Guest	
2023	LGBTQ Herstory Month: Honoring Latinx Heroes	Herself	Guest	
2024	The Pit Stop	Herself	Guest	
2024	Drag Me to the Movies	Various	World of Wonder	

== Discography ==
=== Featured singles ===
Title	Year	Album
"I'm That Bitch" (with The Cast of RuPaul's Drag Race Season 12)	2020	non-album single
"Madonna: The Unauthorized Rusical" (with The Cast of RuPaul's Drag Race Season 12)	2020	non-album single
"I Made It / Mirror Song / Losing Is New Winning" (Las Vegas Live Medley) (with The Cast of RuPaul's Drag Race Season 12)	2020	non-album single
"The Shady Bunch" (with The Cast of RuPaul's Drag Race Season 12)	2020	non-album single

== See also ==
- List of Eagle Scouts
- List of Missouri State University alumni

Preceded by Ginger Minj	Winner of RuPaul's Drag Race All Stars; US All Stars 11	Succeeded by Incumbent
