= Daya Betty =

American drag performer (born 1996)

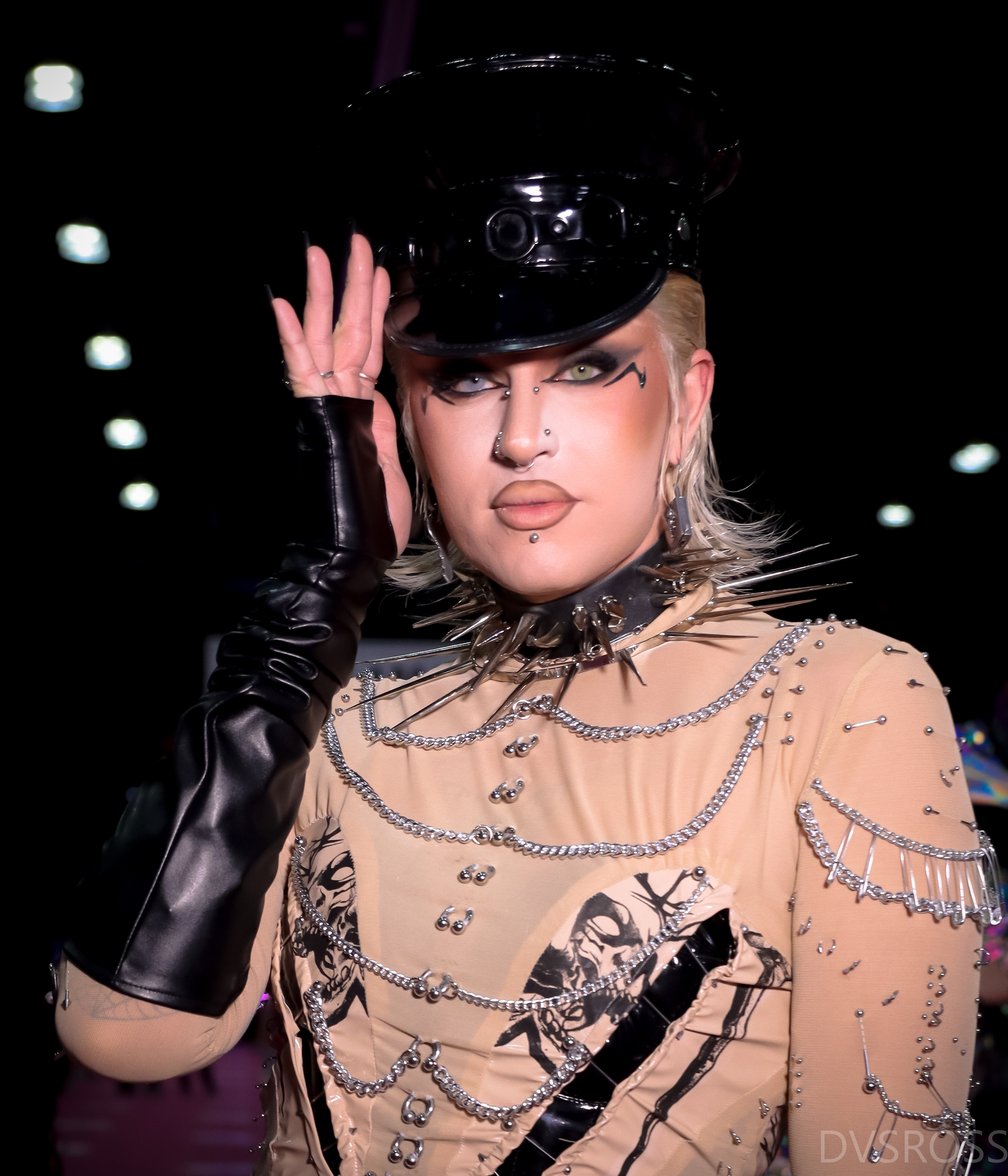
- Daya Betty at RuPaul's DragCon LA, 2023
- Born: Trenton Clarke; February 19, 1996 (age 30); Springfield, Missouri, U.S.
- Education: Missouri State University (BFA)
- Occupation: Drag queen
- Television: RuPaul's Drag Race (season 14) and RuPaul's Drag Race All Stars (season 10)
- Website: dayabetty.com

Daya Betty is the stage name of Trenton Clarke (born February 19, 1996), an American drag performer who competed on the fourteenth season of RuPaul's Drag Race and the tenth season of RuPaul's Drag Race All Stars.

== Early life ==
Trenton Clarke was born in Springfield, Missouri. He earned a Bachelor of Fine Arts degree in graphic design from Missouri State University in 2019.

== Career ==
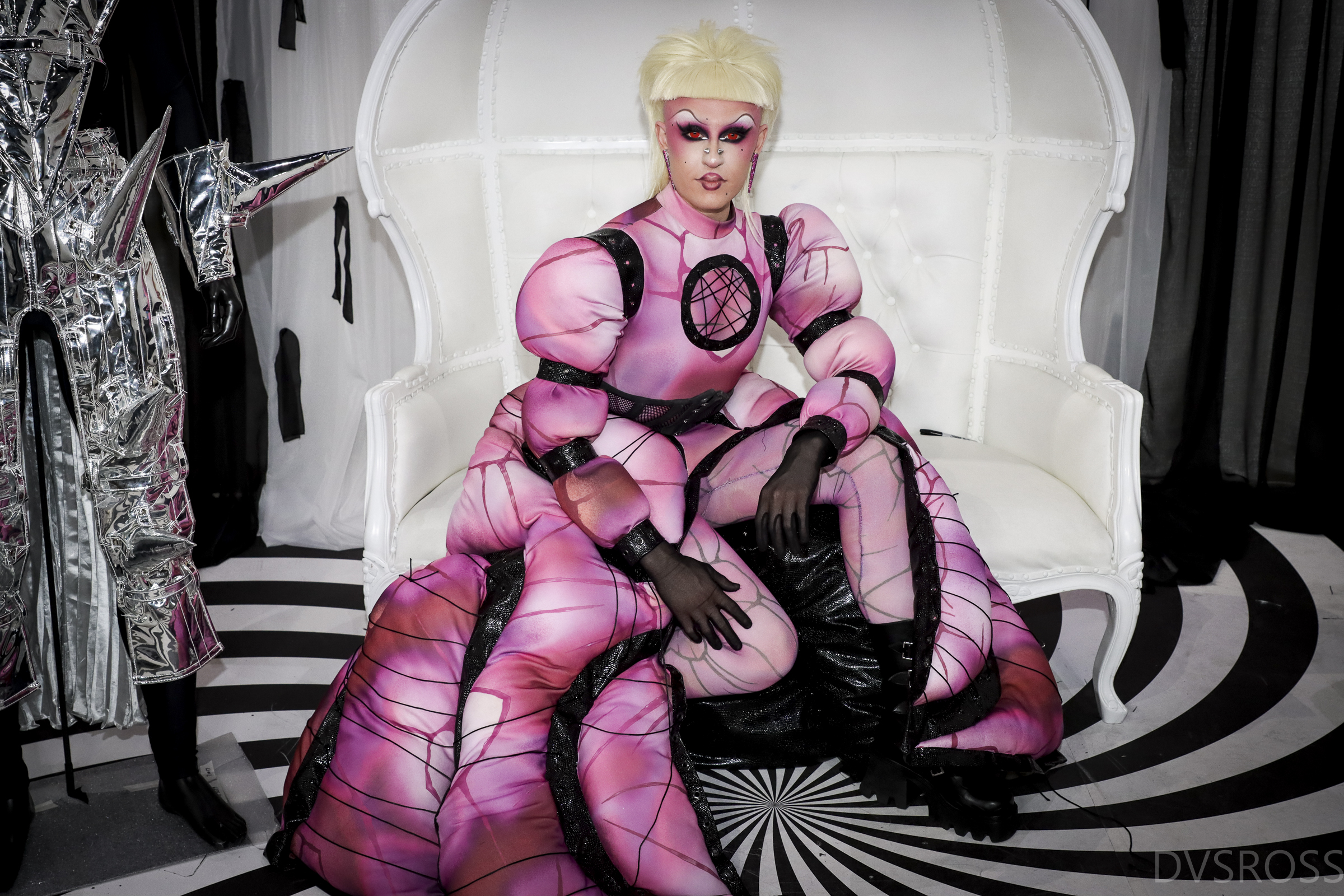
Daya Betty at RuPaul's DragCon LA, 2022

Clarke is a drag queen known as Daya Betty. She competed on the fourteenth season of RuPaul's Drag Race. She was eliminated in the second episode, after being placed in the bottom two and losing a lip-sync contest against DeJa Skye to guest judge Alicia Keys' 2001 song "Fallin'". Daya Betty was brought back into the competition and ultimately placed third. She impersonated Ozzy Osbourne for the Snatch Game challenge, and she portrayed Uniqueness in the Rusical episode, which featured a parody-tribute to the film Moulin Rouge! (2001) called Moulin Ru: The Rusical.

Following Daya Betty's first elimination, Instinct's Michael Cook said she "made a definite impact on both viewers and her fellow queens during her time on Season 14". Chika Ekemezie of The Daily Beast called her "reality TV's best villain". The A.V. Club's Trae DeLellis said Daya Betty "[proved] herself as a producer's dream for producing drama". Paul McCallion of Vulture said she has a "Ph.D. in shit-stirring".

On April 23, 2025, Daya Betty was announced as one of eighteen former Drag Race contestants participating in the tenth season of RuPaul's Drag Race All Stars. She competed in the third bracker, placing in the top twice. In the first episode, she lost a lip-sync for the win against Ginger Minj to the original Broadway cast recording of "Defying Gravity", with Cynthia Erivo and Ariana Grande as guest judges. In the last episode of her bracket, she won a lip-sync for the win against Ginger Minj to "Mama Used to Say". She placed safe throughout the semifianls, and was eventually eliminated in the season finale in a lip-sync against Bosco to Christina Aguilera's 2010 song "Show Me How You Burlesque".

== Other media ==
In the summer of 2025, Daya started the Petty Bettys podcast with her Rupaul's Drag Race All Stars 10 castmate Acid Betty. On July 16, 2025, She released the song "Work" featuring Cynthia Doll, which she had previously performed for her talent show number on Rupaul's Drag Race All Stars 10. An accompanying music video was released the same day. In 2026, She competed on the second season of the Fox game show 99 to Beat, finishing in 41st place. In October 2026, it was announced that Daya would appear in season 2 of the Hulu legal drama All's Fair, which is set to be released in November 2026.

== Personal life ==
Clarke is openly gay. He has type 1 diabetes and has made his diagnosis part of his drag identity.

Daya Betty is the "drag daughter" of season 12 contestant Crystal Methyd.

== Filmography ==
Year	Title	Genre	Role	Notes	Ref
2022	RuPaul's Drag Race (season 14)	TV	Contestant	3rd place (15 episodes)	
2022	RuPaul's Drag Race: Untucked (season 13)	TV	Herself	(13 episodes)	
2025	RuPaul's Drag Race All Stars (season 10)	TV	Contestant	5th place (6 episodes)	
2025	RuPaul's Drag Race All Stars: Untucked! (season 7)	TV	Herself	(6 episodes)	
2026	99 to Beat	TV	Herself	41st place	
2026	All's Fair	TV	TBC	(2 episodes)	

== See also ==
- List of Missouri State University alumni
- List of people from Springfield, Missouri
- List of people with type 1 diabetes
