= Geraldine Holm Hoch =

American engineer

- Born: June 10, 1924; Independence, Missouri
- Died: May 3, 1973 (aged 48)
- Education: Southwest Missouri State Teacher's College
- Scientific career
- Workplaces: Pratt & Whitney; Northrop Grumman; Bendix Corporation; Midwest Research Institute; Lockheed Martin

Geraldine Holm Hoch (June 10, 1924 – May 3, 1973) was an American chemical engineer who was one of the first women to work at Pratt & Whitney, Northrop Grumman, Bendix Corporation, the Midwest Research Institute and Lockheed Martin. She patented corrosion prevention systems for the Lockheed L-1011 TriStar and used on the Boeing 747.

== Early life and education ==
Geraldine Marie Holm was born in Independence, Missouri. Geraldine (Gerry) graduated from high school at the age of 15, and won an award as the best student in English. She attended Southwest Missouri State Teacher's College, which is now part of Missouri State University and graduated with highest honors. She was selected in 1940 for "Who's Who for colleges and universities". While still in college, she taught physics classes for the United States Air Force at the age of 17. She completed courses on stress analysis at the Northrop School of Aviation and completed courses from Kansas University in radio and electronics technologies. She belonged to Kappa Mu Epsilon, a specialized honor society in Mathematics and served as an elected officer in that organization for Missouri's Alpha chapter. She was also a member of Alpha Phi Delta, an honorary sorority, and Theta NU Theta, a Social Sorority.

== Research and career ==
Geraldine Holm graduated in 1943 with a degree in both chemistry and math (double major). Fresh out of college she worked for Pratt & Whitney Aircraft Engine Corp in Kansas City, Missouri, as an electrochemist in research and development supporting the Pratt & Whitney R-4360 Wasp Major aircraft engine which saw service at the end of World War II in the retro-fitted models of the Boeing B-29 Superfortress and later used on the Boeing B-50 "Lucky Lady".

She then moved to Southern California for career opportunities where she was employed in 1948 with Northrop Grumman (then called Northrop Aviation) in Los Angeles. She was one of the first female research chemists employed there. She worked alongside Jack Northrop in research and development.

At Northrop, she worked on the SM-62 Snark missile project, an intercontinental missile program that resulted in the development of one of the world's most complex digital computers and astronomical guidance systems.

Holm Hoch electroforming a missile body at the Midwest Research Institute

In 1950, Gerry moved to Kansas to start a family. From 1950 to 1952 she worked at Bendix Corporation as chemical engineer and handled research and development in nickel electroforming. She then joined Midwest Research Institute and furthered her research as an electrochemist. She designed the electroforming facility to produce cylindrical shells for missile body wind tunnel studies. At MRIGlobal, she became aware of the gender paygap. Despite working on materials science for the space program, she was paid as an administrator.

In 1965, she returned to California and accepted a position as a research chemist for Lockheed Martin, (aka Lockheed Calif Company, Rye Canyon Research Division) where she worked in metallurgy. Hoch developed and patented new ways to prevent corrosion.

Works at Northrop Grumman credit her corrosion prevention efforts in the design of the fuselage panels for Boeing 747s.

She presented her work at the 1971 NATO conference held in Brussels, Belgium.

Gerry developed cancer but continued to work at Lockheed while she was unwell.

== Personal life ==
Geraldine Holm met her future husband, Harry Edward Hoch, an industrial engineer, in a carpool at work. They raised 3 children who all became engineers. She was a member Business and Professional Women's Foundation in San Fernando Valley, California. She died of cancer on May 3, 1973, in Los Angeles.
