= Big Opening =

Big Opening may refer to:

- "Big Opening Number 1", an episode of RuPaul's Drag Race
- "Big Opening Number 2", an episode of RuPaul's Drag Race

== See also ==
- The Grand Opening (disambiguation)
- Opening ceremony
