= Save a Queen =

- RuPaul's Drag Race episode
- Episode no.: Season 14; Episode 5
- Presented by: RuPaul

Guest appearances
- Ava Max (guest judge); Jaymes Mansfield; Kahmora Hall; Tempest DuJour

Episode chronology
← Previous "She's a Super Tease"	Next → "Glamazon Prime"

"Save a Queen" is the fifth episode of the fourteenth season of RuPaul's Drag Race. It originally aired on February 4, 2022. The episode's main challenge tasks the contestants with writing commercials to get donations for a charity that raises awareness for first-eliminated contestants. Ava Max is a guest judge, and former contestants Jaymes Mansfield, Kahmora Hall, and Tempest DuJour also make guest appearances.

Bosco wins the episode's main challenge. Orion Story is eliminated from the competition after placing in the bottom and losing a lip-sync contest against Jorgeous to Max's "My Head & My Heart".

== Episode ==
Bosco (pictured at RuPaul's DragCon LA in 2022) wins the episode's main challenge.

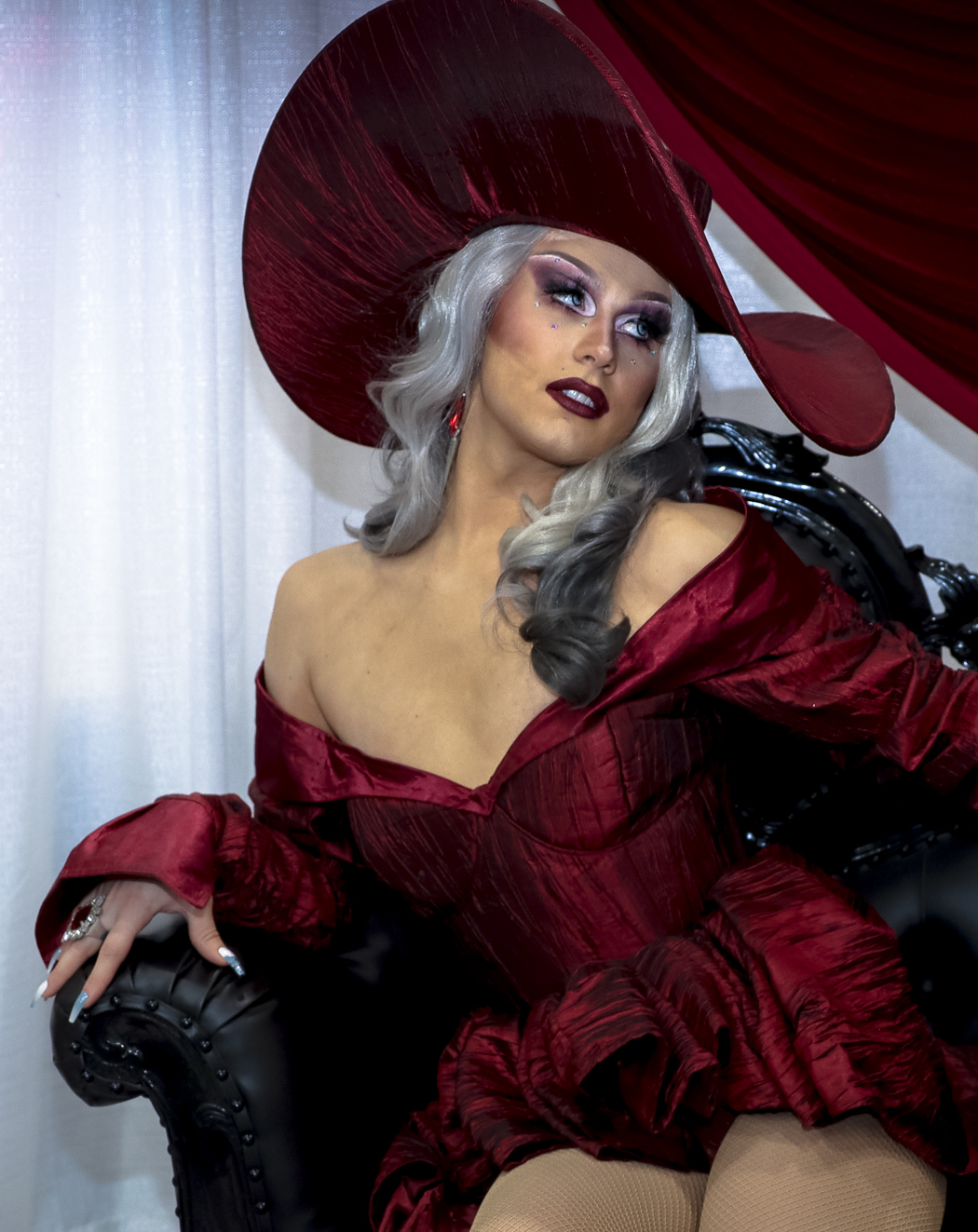
Orion Story (pictured in 2022) is eliminated from the competition

The contestants return to the Werk Room after Alyssa Hunter's elimination on the previous episode, then get out of drag. On a new day, RuPaul greets the group and reveals that Kornbread "The Snack" Jeté has been removed from the competition due to an ankle injury she sustained last episode. RuPaul then invites members of the Pit Crew to assist with determining teams for the main challenge. The contestants thrust their pelvises to pop balloons between them and a member of the Pit Crew.

After the teams are determined, RuPaul invites former first-eliminated contestants Jaymes Mansfield, Kahmora Hall, and Tempest DuJour to help with the main challenge. RuPaul then reveals the main challenge, which tasks the contestants with teaming up to write public service announcements (PSA) to get donations for "Save a Queen", a charity that raises awareness for first-eliminated contestants. The former competitors star as main characters in each of the commercials. Following are the team colors and members:

- Team Jaymes Mansfield (Purple): Jasmine Kennedie, Maddy Morphosis, Orion Story, and Willow Pill
- Team Kahmora Hall (Green): Bosco, Daya Betty, and Lady Camden
- Team Tempest DuJour (Orange): Angeria Paris VanMicheals, DeJa Skye, Jorgeous, and Kerri Colby

The contestants get into groups and start to develop their concepts. RuPaul returns to the Werk Room to meet with each team, asking questions and offering advice. The teams then record in front of a green screen, with assistance from Michelle Visage. On elimination day, the contestants make final preparations in the Werk Room for the fashion show. Jorgeous talks about her early drag performances. Willow Pill talks about living with cystinosis.

On the main stage, RuPaul welcomes fellow judges Visage and Ross Mathews, as well as guest judge Ava Max. RuPaul shares the assignment of the main challenge and the runway category ("Spring Has Sprung"), then the fashion show commences. After the contestants present their looks, the group watch the PSAs. The judges deliver their critiques, deliberate, then share the results with the contestants. Bosco is declared the winner of the main challenge. Jorgeous and Orion Story place in the bottom and face off in a lip-sync contest to "My Head & My Heart (2020) by Max. Jorgeous is declared the winner. Orion Story then opens her chocolate bar to reveal a plain chocolate bar and is eliminated from the competition. She returns to the Werk Room and uses lipstick to write a message on the mirror for the remaining contestants.

== Production and broadcast ==
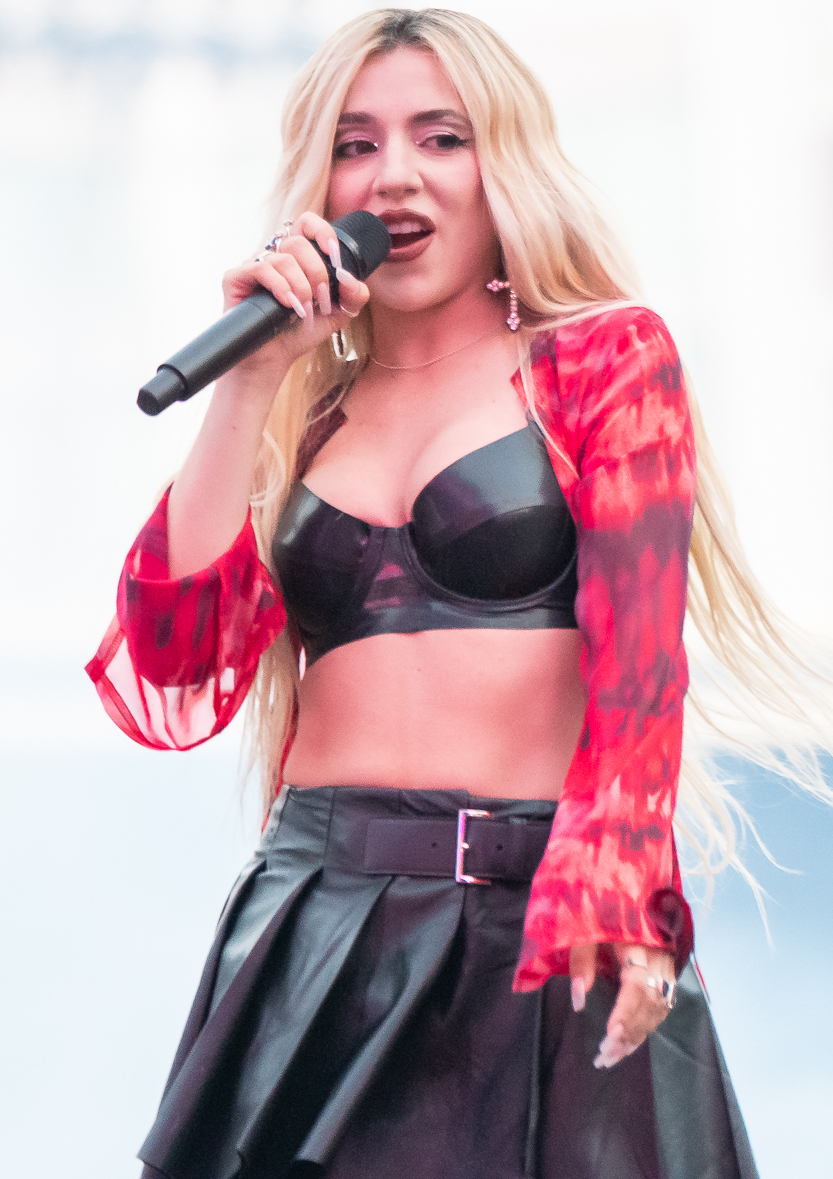
Ava Max (pictured in 2023) is a guest judge.

The episode originally aired on February 4, 2022. After the show aired, streams of "My Head & My Heart" increased by eleven percent.

Bruno Alcantara is among members of the Pit Crew.

Contestants Alyssa Hunter and June Jambalaya shared on social media what they would have worn for the episode had they remained in the competition.

=== Fashion ===
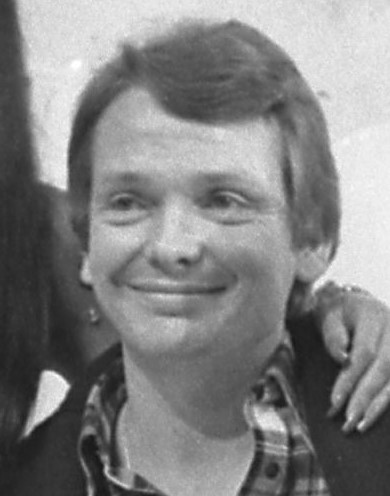
Kahmora Hall wears a dress designed by Bob Mackie (pictured in 1975)

In the Werk Room, RuPaul wears a plaid suit and a light blue dress shirt. For the main stage, RuPaul wears a dress with a floral print and a blonde wig.

For the fashion show, Jorgeous wears a short spring green dress and a dark wig. Kerri Colby has a green dress, large flowers, and a headpiece. Angeria Paris VanMicheals wears a colorful dress with many flowers, gloves, and a brown wig. DeJa Skye has a pastel outfit with a yellow belt and a mask. Maddy Morphosis's outfit resembles a thundercloud and rain. Jasmine Kennedie wears a beaded and stoned corset, gloves, tall boots, and a red wig. Orion Story has an Easter Bunny-inspired outfit. Willow Pill wears a house-shaped headpiece. 'Help' is written on the back of the house in blood. Daya Betty has a short orange outfit with many butterflies and a short blonde wig. Lady Camden wears a colorful dress with a floral print. Her dress resembles a table with plates of food and her headpiece is a teacup. She also wears tea bags as earrings. Bosco also has a thundercloud-inspired outfit, which reveals into a yellow dress. She wears white gloves and a blonde wig.

The three first-eliminated contestants also present runway looks. Tempest DuJour's outfit has a leopard print. Jaymes Mansfield wears a pink dress and a blonde wig styled as a beehive. Kahmora Hall has a vintage Bob Mackie-designed dress.

== Reception ==
Trae DeLellis of The A.V. Club gave the episode a rating of 'B-'. Paul McCallion of Vulture rated the episode two out of five stars. Bryan Rindfuss of the San Antonio Current said Jorgeous "took no prisoners and slayed her competition with ease". Jake Dee of Screen Rant said of the guest judge: "Thoughtful, measured, and articulate, Ava showed wisdom far beyond her years in her deliberations." Bernardo Sim selected "My Head & My Heart" for Pride.com's 2023 list of the best lip-syncs from each of the show's seasons. Sim wrote, "This was the very first time that Jorgeous lip synced on the show, and it was only a sneak preview of what this queen was able to pull off in her performances. While Story did her best to keep up, there was just no room on the stage for anyone but Jorgeous to mop the floor with her dazzling moves and face journeys."
