= Big Opening Number 1 =

- RuPaul's Drag Race episode
- Episode no.: Season 14; Episode 1
- Original air date: January 7, 2022

Guest appearance
- Lizzo

Episode chronology
← Previous "Grand Finale"	Next → "Big Opening Number 2"

"Big Opening #1" is the first episode of the fourteenth season of the American television series RuPaul's Drag Race. It originally aired on January 7, 2022. The episode's main challenge tasks contestants with performing in a talent show. Lizzo is a guest judge. Kornbread "The Snack" Jeté wins the main challenge. Orion Story is eliminated from the competition, after placing in the bottom two and losing a lip-sync against June Jambalaya to "Water Me" by Lizzo.

== Episode ==
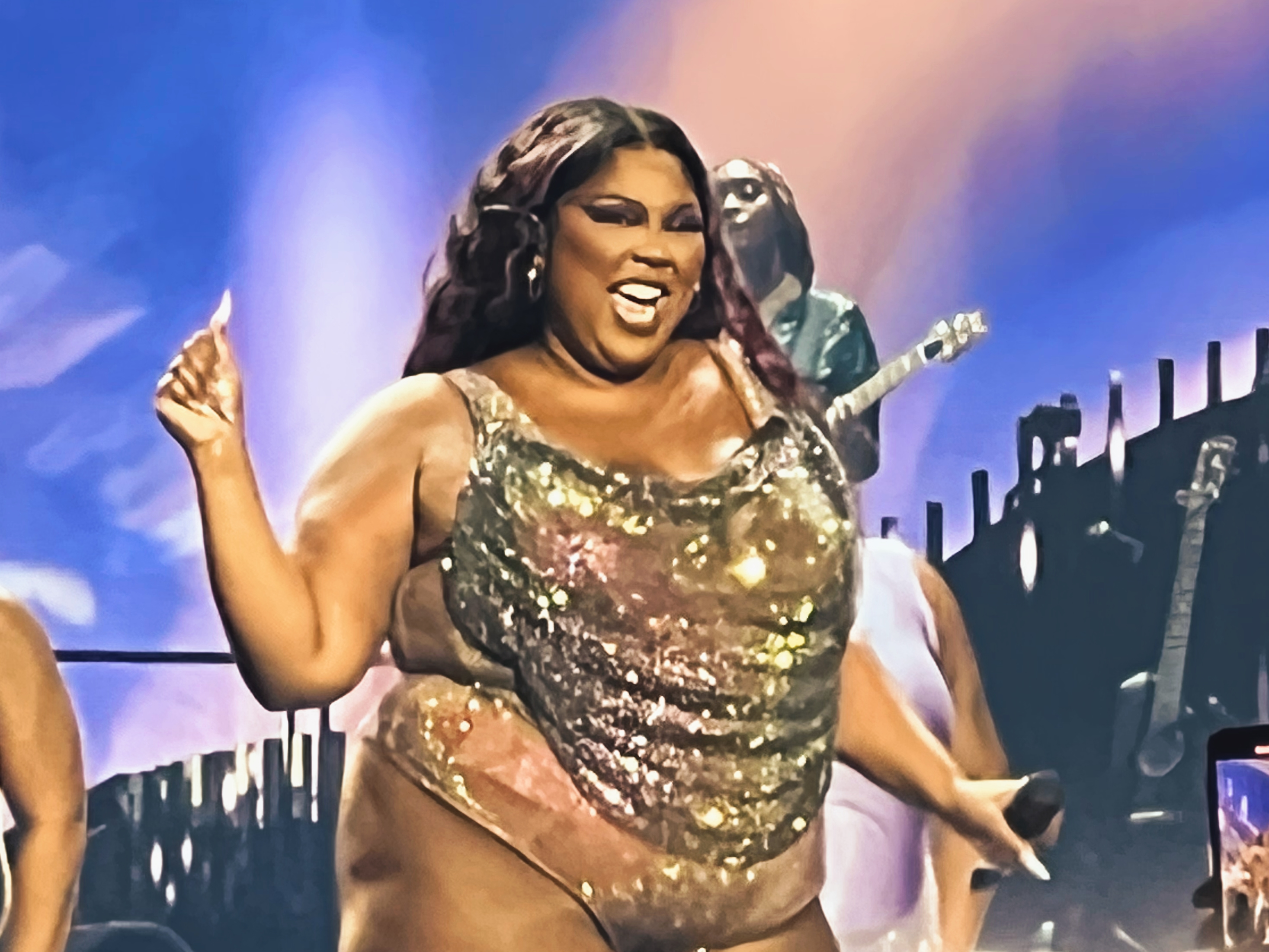
Lizzo (pictured in 2022) is a guest judge.

Seven new contestants enter the Werk Room. RuPaul greets the group and confirms that the season has split premiere. For the first mini-challenge, the contestants participate in a photo shoot with guest photographer Albert Sanchez, while strapped to a spinning wheel. Kerri Colby wins the mini-challenge.

RuPaul reveals the main challenge, which tasks contestants with performing in a talent show for the judges. The contestants get out of drag. RuPaul returns to the Werk Room and meets with the contestants individually. Willow Pill shares about her chronic illness. RuPaul confirms that Lizzo is the guest judge and reminds the contestants that one of them will be eliminated from the competition. The contestants begin to prepare for the talent show. Kerri Colby and Kornbread "The Snack" Jeté discuss religion. A prerecorded video of Lizzo appears on the screen, then Lizzo surprises the group by entering the Werk Room.

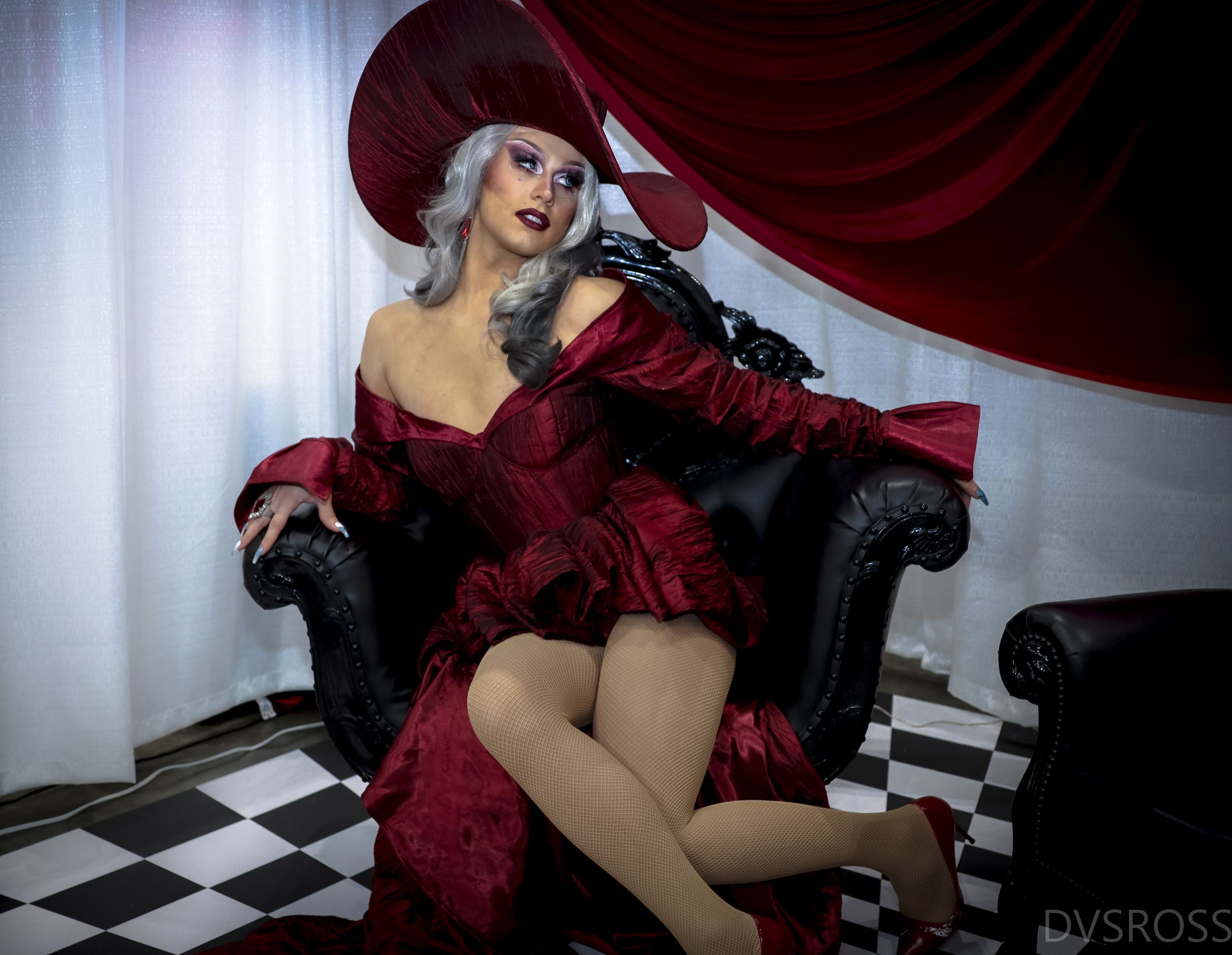
Orion Story (pictured in 2022) is eliminated from the competition.

On the main stage, RuPaul performs with backup dancers to her song "Catwalk", then welcomes fellow judges Michelle Visage and Ross Mathews, as well as Lizzo. The talent show commences. Following are the acts:

- Alyssa Hunter – lip-syncing
- Bosco – burlesque
- June Jambalaya – African dance
- Kerri Colby – jump roping and lip-syncing
- Kornbread "The Snack" Jeté – original song
- Orion Story – comedy skit
- Willow Pill – self-care in quarantine

RuPaul shares the runway category ("Signature Show-Stopping Drag"), then the contestants present their looks. The judges deliver their critiques, deliberate, then share the results with the group. Bosco, Kornbread "The Snack" Jeté, and Willow Pill receive positive critiques, and Kornbread "The Snack" Jeté wins the challenge. Alyssa Hunter, June Jambalaya, and Orion Story receive negative critiques, and Alyssa Hunter is deemed safe. June Jambalaya and Orion Story place in the bottom and face off in a lip-sync contest to "Water Me" (2017) by Lizzo. June Jambalaya wins the lip-sync and Orion Story is eliminated from the competition.

== Production and broadcast ==
The episode originally aired on January 7, 2022.

=== Fashion ===
For her entrance look, Kerri Colby wears a dress with the colors of the transgender flag (pictured).

For her entrance look, Alyssa Hunter carries a bow and arrow. Bosco wears a black dress with white polka dots. She has horns on the top of her head. Kornbread "The Snack" Jeté wears a dress resembling a leather jacket. Willow Pill wears a short white skirt and a shirt with the text "Angle". She has a white hat and carries a purse. Kerri Colby's dress features the colors of the transgender flag (light blue, pink, and white). June Jambalaya's outfit has a colorful print. Orion Story carries a telephone resembling a hamburger.

For the judging panel, RuPaul wears a black dress and a blonde wig. For the talent show, June Jambalaya wears a traditional African outfit. During her performance, Bosco removes her gloves, pieces of her outfit resembling flower petals, and her dress. She also removes her corset to reveal pasties and a flower prop on her backside. Alyssa Hunter wears a black outfit with many straps and tall boots. Kerri Colby wears a white outfit with the text "Kerri". She has tall white socks and white sneakers. Orion Story wears an outfit with animal print, as well as a white headband and a fanny pack. She has a cigarette in her mouth. Kornbread "The Snack" Jeté's outfit has snake print. Her wig is blonde and pink. She wears a necklace with a chicken wing. Willow Pill wears a white dress and a blonde wig. She removes her dress to reveal her pink swimsuit and white stockings.

For the fashion show, June Jambalaya wears a sparkly jumpsuit. Bosco has a black outfit with large horns on her chest and on the top of her head. Alyssa Hunter's My Fair Lady-inspired dress has ostrich feathers. She has a large hat and an umbrella. Kerri Colby wears an outfit made of many "K"s. She has a long jacket, red boots, and a pink wig. Orion Story wears a red-and-white outfit. She removes her cape to reveal three breasts covered by pasties. She has a white belt and a blonde wig. Kornbread "The Snack" Jeté's dress is sparkly and she has a matching hood for her head. Willow Pill's outfit is blue and green.

== Reception ==
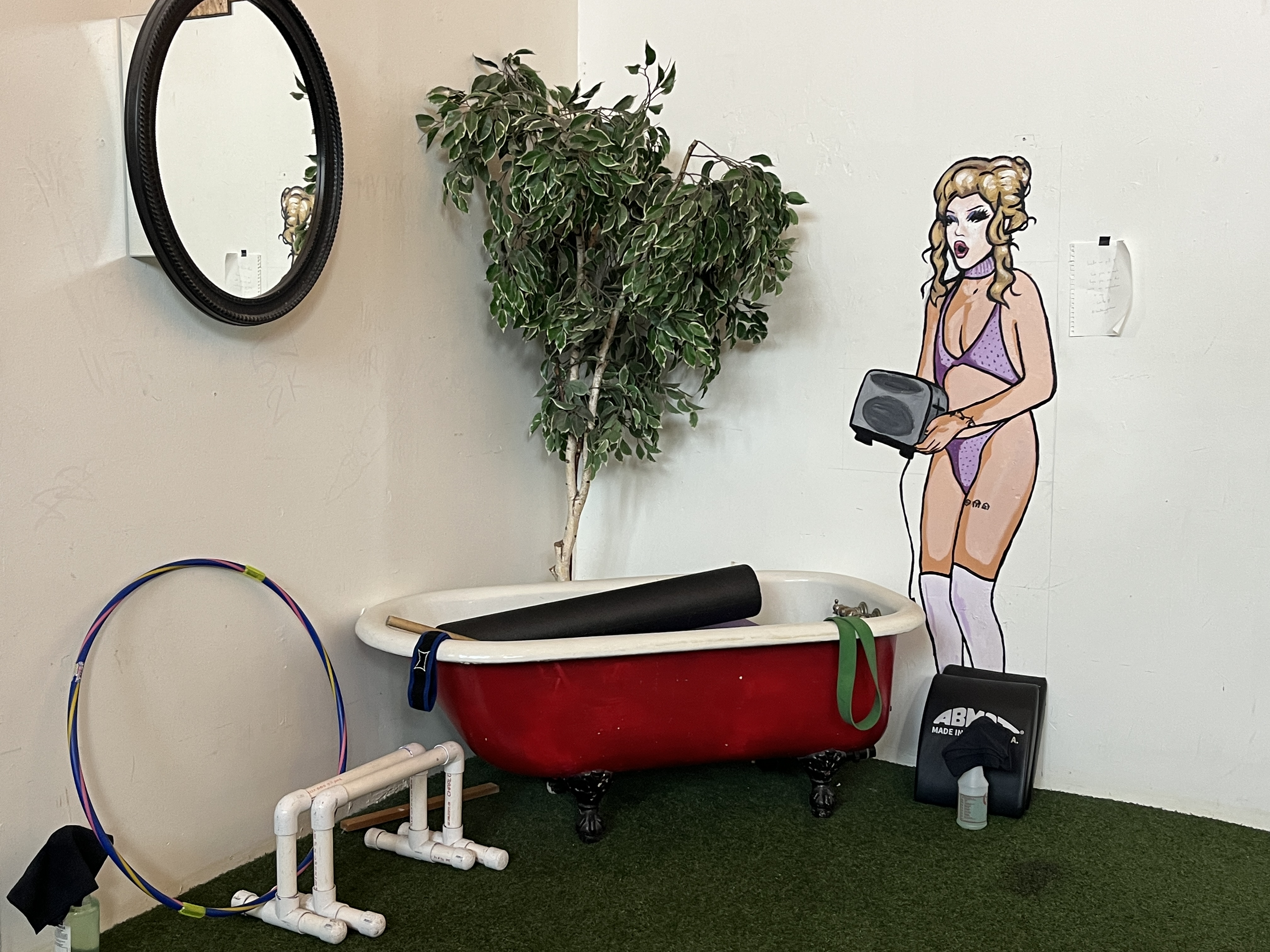
Art installation at a gym in Seattle, referencing Willow Pill's talent show performance from the episode.

Trae DeLellis of The A.V. Club gave the episode a rating of 'A-'.

Honeysuckle Magazine wrote, "During the talent show maxi challenge, Willow Pill delivered a jaw dropping performance. Her adorable but psychedelic aesthetic shone through in a chaotic yet comedic skit while she lip synced to 'Only Time' by Enya. Looking like an angel ready for bed, Willow spilled wine and spaghetti into a bathtub, then a toaster, before she dove into the electrifying food-filled bath." Sam Hurley of Screen Rant wrote, "Willow's performance was kooky, hilarious and nothing like the show had ever seen before. At that moment, not only did the fans fall in love with Willow, but RuPaul did as well." Out magazine called her performance both "bizarre" and "bizarrely entertaining". Dale Fox included her performance in Attitude magazine's 2024 list of fifteen "favourite iconic moments" from the show, writing: "Never have we seen so many bemused looks from RuPaul in one sitting. Willow's performance was iconic for so many reasons, but mainly because it introduced the omnipotent goddess that is Enya to the show for the first time."
