= Glamazon Prime =

- RuPaul's Drag Race episode
- Episode no.: Season 14; Episode 6
- Presented by: RuPaul
- Original air date: February 11, 2022

Guest appearance
- Taraji P. Henson

Episode chronology
← Previous "Save a Queen"	Next → "The Daytona Wind"

"Glamazon Prime" is the sixth episode of the fourteenth season of the American television series RuPaul's Drag Race. It originally aired on February 11, 2022. The episode's main challenge tasks the contestants with creating an outfit made from unconventional materials. Taraji P. Henson is a guest judge. Jorgeous wins the main challenge. Maddy Morphosis is eliminated from the competition after placing in the bottom and losing a lip-sync contest against Jasmine Kennedie to "Suga Mama" by Beyoncé.

== Episode ==
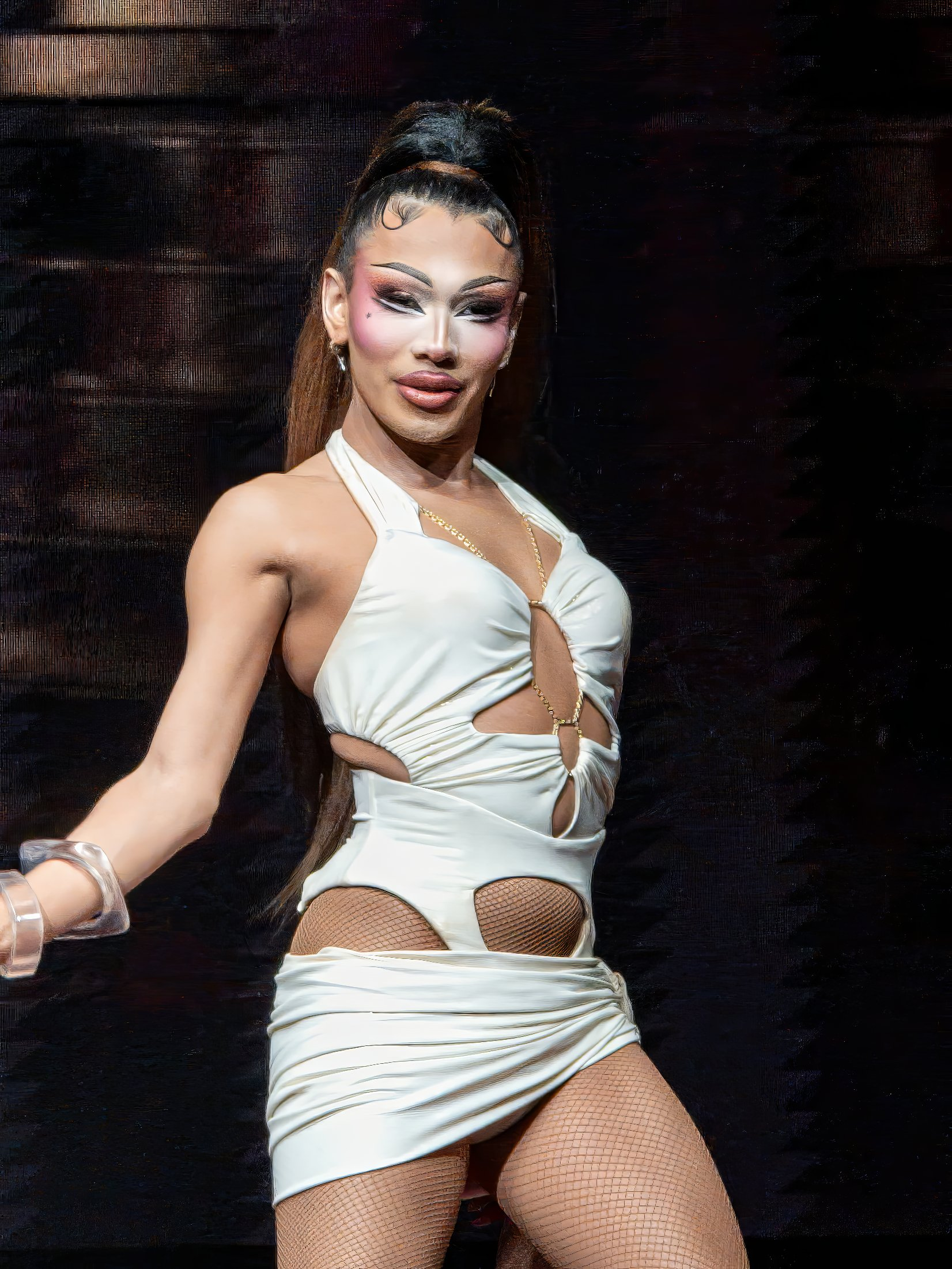
Jorgeous (pictured in 2025) wins the episode's main challenge.

The contestants return to the Werk Room after Orion Story's elimination on the previous episode., then get out of drag. On a new day, RuPaul greets the group and reveals the main challenge, which tasks the contestants with creating outfits made from "junk" (unconventional materials) purchased online by Michelle Visage. Members of the Pit Crew bring in boxes, then the contestants collect their materials and start to create their outfits.

RuPaul and Carson Kressley visit the Werk Room to meet with contestants, asking questions and offering advice. Kressley reveals that Taraji P. Henson is a guest judge. Daya Betty expresses frustration from being compared to "drag family" member and former competitor Crystal Methyd. While the contestants make final preparations for the fashion show, Kerri Colby talks about her unpleasant upbringing and her relationship with her father. Jasmine Kennedie and Lady Camden discuss their coming out experiences. Maddy Morphosis talks about her relationship with family members and revealing to them that she does drag.

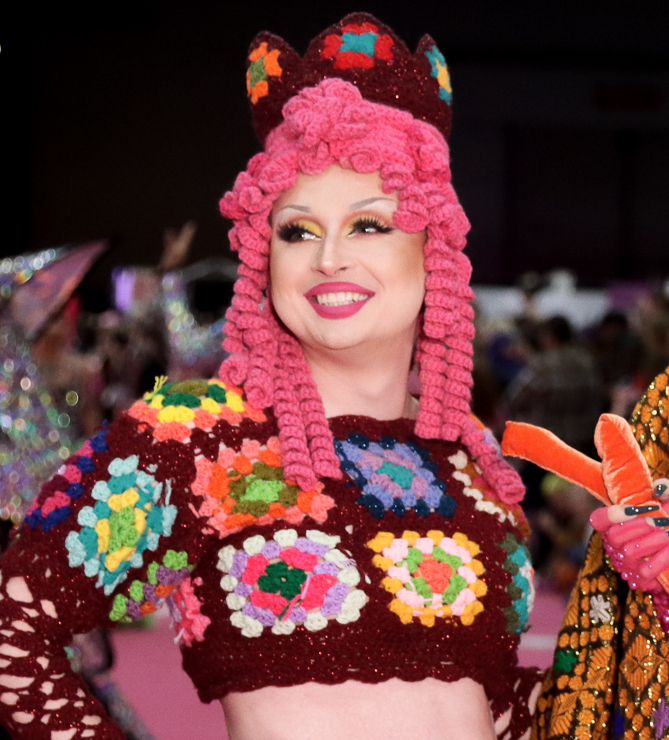
Maddy Morphosis (pictured at RuPaul's DragCon LA in 2023) is eliminated from the competition.

On the main stage, RuPaul welcomes fellow judges Visage and Kressley, as well as Henson. RuPaul shares the runway category ("Glamazon Primetime"), then the fashion show commences. After the contestants present their looks, the judges deliver their critiques, deliberate, then share the results with the group. Angeria Paris VanMicheals, Jorgeous, and Lady Camden receive positive critiques, and Jorgeous wins the challenge. DeJa Skye, Jasmine Kennedie, and Maddy Morphosis receive negative critiques, and DeJa Skye is deemed safe. Jasmine Kennedie and Maddy Morphosis place in the bottom and face off in a lip-sync contest to "Suga Mama" (2006) by Beyoncé. Jasmine Kennedie wins the lip-sync. Maddy Morphosis then opens her chocolate bar to reveal a plain chocolate bar, and is eliminated from the competition.

== Production ==
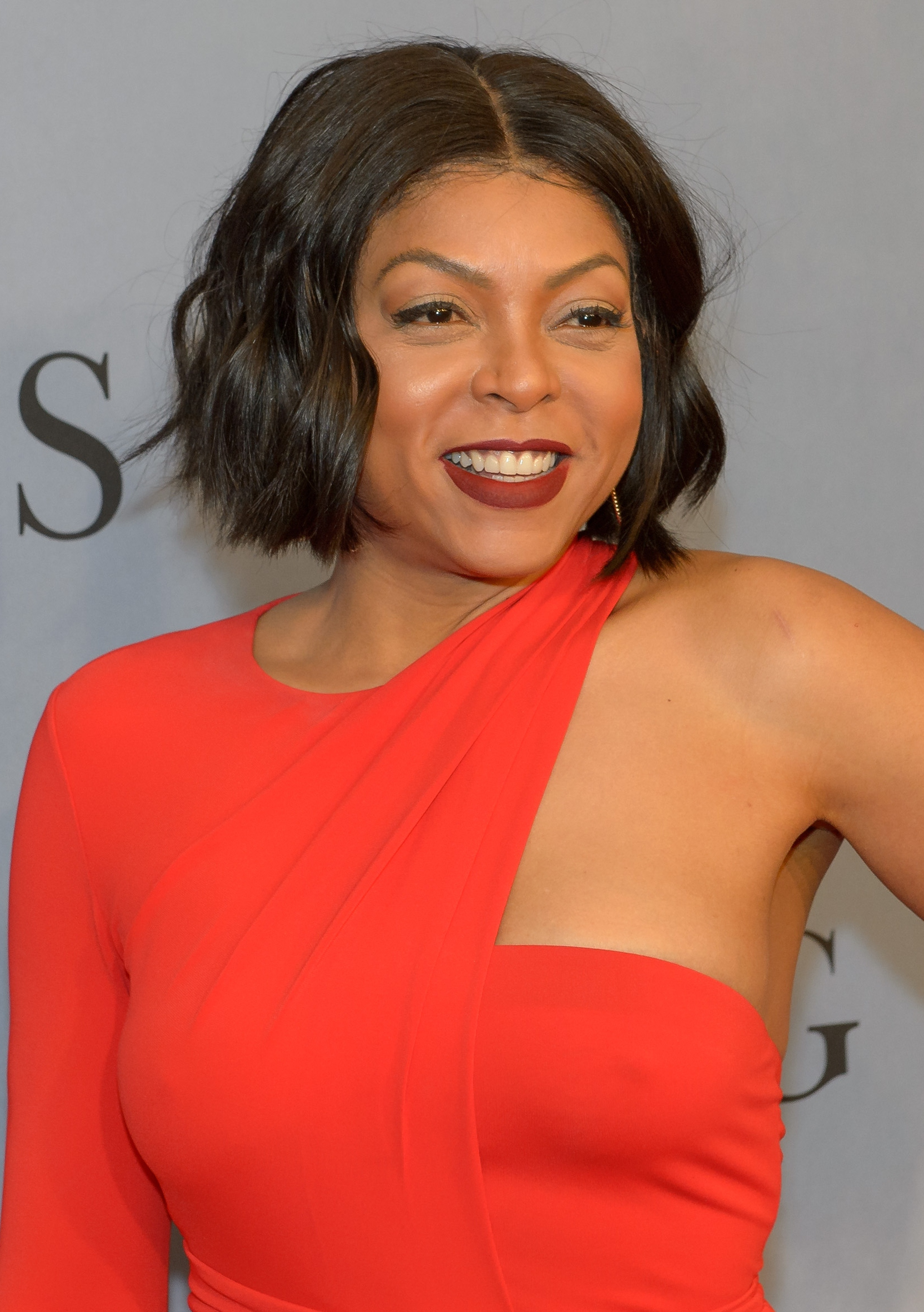
Taraji P. Henson (pictured in 2016) is a guest judge.

The episode originally aired on February 11, 2022.

Jasmine Kennedie and Maddy Morphosis argue on the corresponding episode of RuPaul's Drag Race: Untucked. Billboard's Stephen Daw said Jasmine Kennedie performed "booty-shaking dance moves" during the lip-sync contest. Sam Damshenas of Gay Times called the lip-sync an "epic showdown".

=== Fashion ===
For the fashion show, Lady Camden wears a blue-and-pink outfit with wings, a blonde wig, and a halo as a headpiece. Jasmine Kennedie wears a pink outfit, a large hat covered in yarn, and yellow high-heeled shoes. Daya Betty's pink-and-yellow outfit is made from bed skirts. Maddy Morphosis has a rodeo clown-inspired colorful outfit made from aprons. She carries a blowup doll of a man. Willow Pill has long arms with fuzzy fingers. She has polka dot horns. Bosco wears a blue outfit, a blue wig, and white high-heeled shoes. She has an orange collar with spikes. DeJa Skye's pink-and-white outfit is inspired by Aphrodite, the Greek goddess of love. She also wears a headpiece. Angeria Paris VanMichaels wears a black-and-white dress and carries a purse. Jorgeous has a short blue-and-yellow dress made from curtains, with cookie cutters attached. Kerri Colby has a short dress and a blue wig.

Entertainment Weekly described Lady Camden's look as a "fairy fantasy". Nylon said Maddy Morphosis "chose camp over style, haphazardly crafting a patchwork-style dress and using a blowup doll as a prop in a way that felt more confusing than entertaining". Maddy Morphosis later earned the Golden Boot Award for her look.

== Reception and impact ==
Trae DeLellis of The A.V. Club gave the episode a rating a 'A-'. Paul McCallion of Vulture rated the episode three out of five stars.

Cameron Scheetz ranked the "Suga Mama" performance fifth in Queerty's 2022 list of the season's ten best lip-sync contests. Scheetz wrote, "this face-off between Jasmine and Maddy was unforgettable thanks to passionate performances both on stage and behind-the-scenes. During Untucked, the girls were in their feelings about the possibility of going home, resulting in a delirious shouting match that was Drag Race drama at its best ('This is your moment! Have it!'). That fight fueled an absolutely jaw-dropping, hair-whipping turn from Jasmine, channeling the full power of Beyoncé, while Maddy held her own, finding a fun energy for the song that overcame the sight of her Golden Boot-earning patchwork dress." Jake Dee of Screen Rant said the contest "[lead] to a contentious and confounding elimination that left fans reeling".

After the episode aired, streams of "Suga Mama" increased by 111 percent. The song received 77,000 streams in the U.S., compared to 33,000 the week prior.
