= A Pair of Balls =

- RuPaul's Drag Race episode
- Episode no.: Season 14; Episode 3
- Presented by: RuPaul
- Original air date: January 21, 2022

Episode chronology
← Previous "Big Opening Number 2"	Next → "She's a Super Tease"

"A Pair of Balls" is the third episode of the fourteenth season of the American television series RuPaul's Drag Race. It originally aired on January 21, 2022. The episode's main challenge tasks the contestants with presenting three looks in a fashion show. Christine Chiu is a guest judge. Willow Pill wins the main challenge. June Jambalaya is eliminated from the competition after placing in the bottom and losing a lip-sync contestants against Maddy Morphosis to "I Love It" (2020) by Kylie Minogue.

== Episode ==
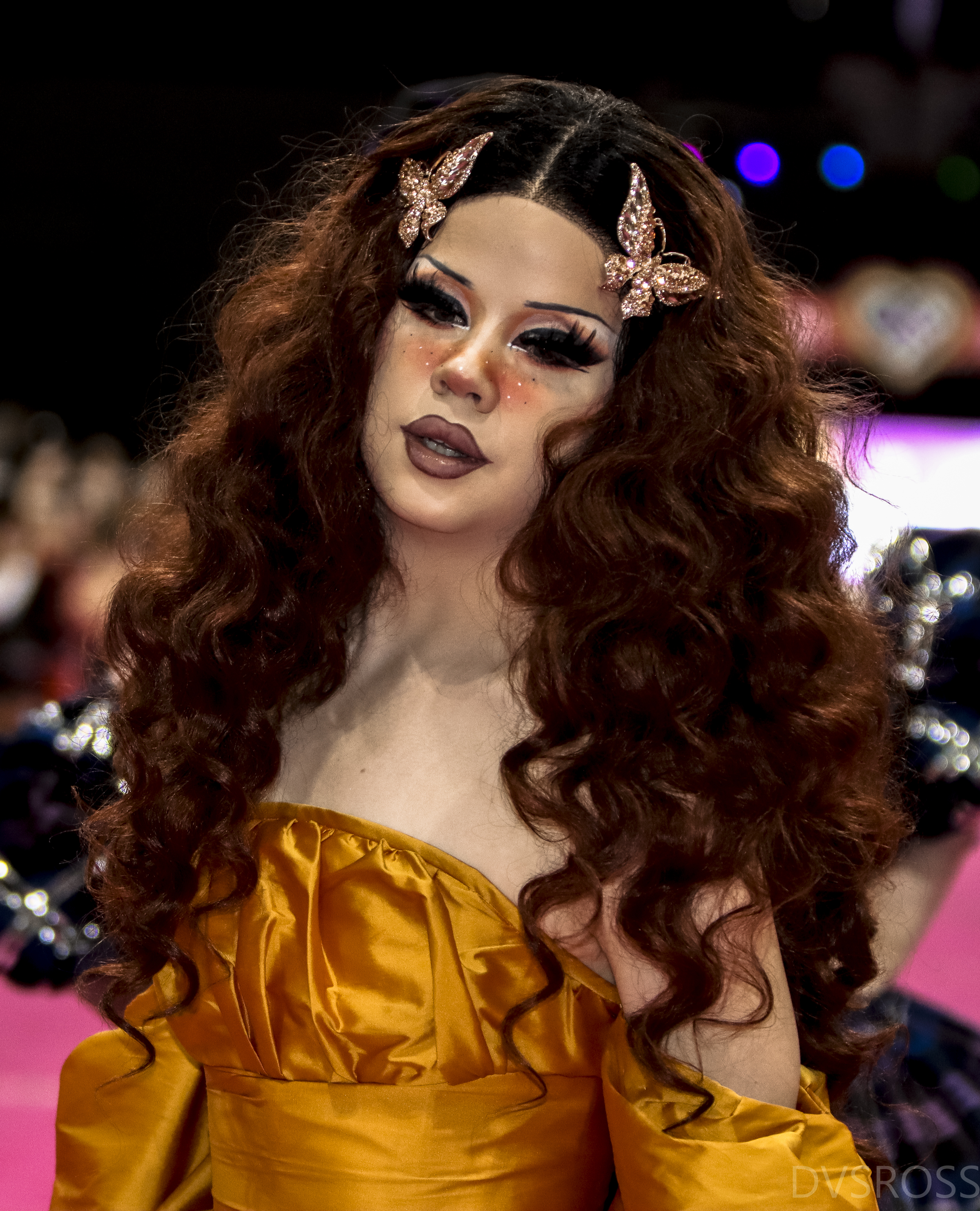
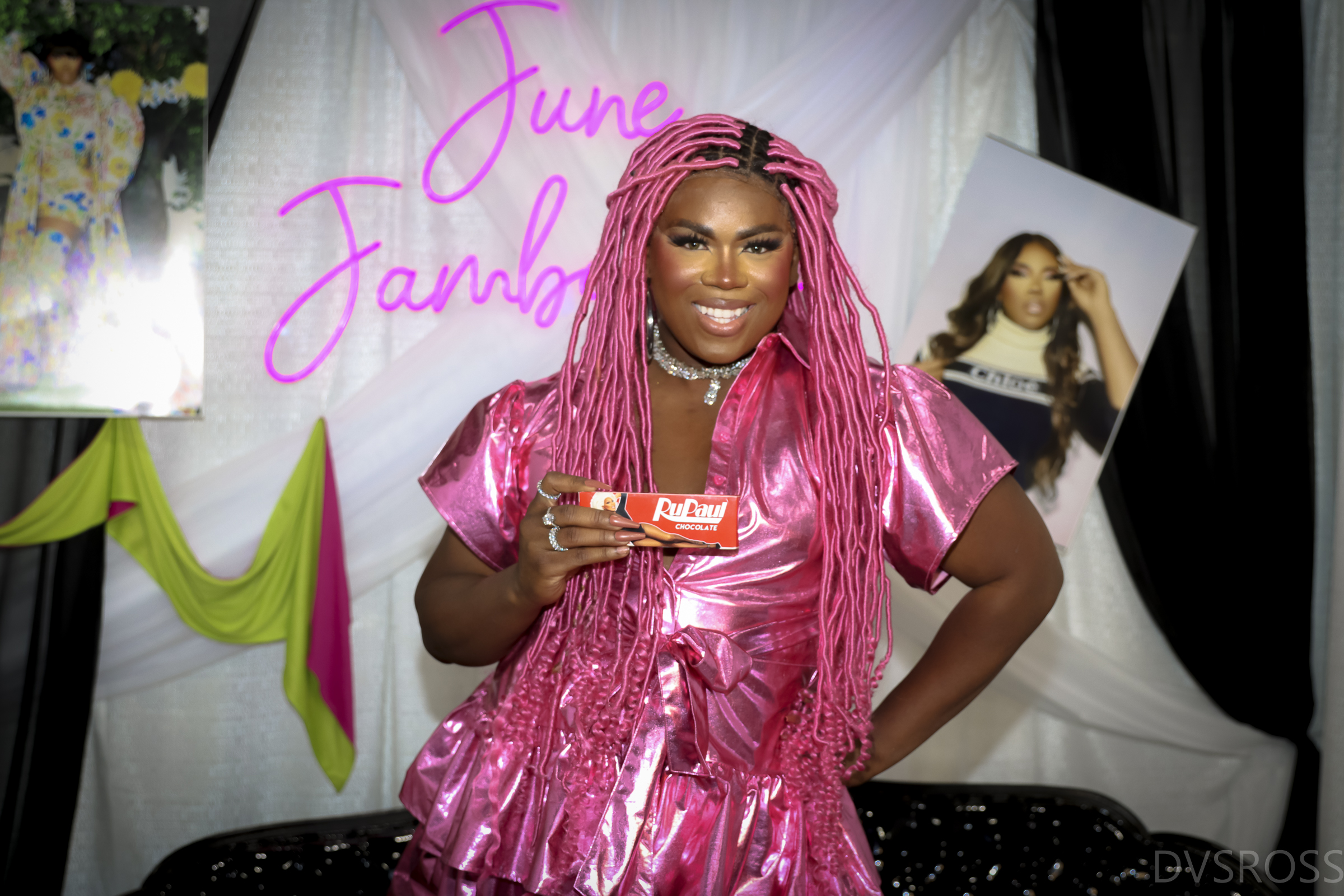
Willow Pill (top, pictured at RuPaul's DragCon LA in 2022) win's the episode's main challenge; June Jambalaya (bottom, pictured at the same event) is eliminated from the competition.

The two groups of contestants return to the Werk Room after Daya Betty's elimination on the previous episode. On a new day, RuPaul greets the merged group and announces that previously eliminated contestants Daya Betty and Orion Story are returning to the competition. RuPaul then reveals the twist of the season: each contestant will choose a RuPaul chocolate bar. When a contestant loses a Lip Sync for Your Life, they will open their chocolate bar. If it contains a gold bar, they will be saved from elimination; otherwise, they will sashay away. The contestants select their bars.

RuPaul then reveals the main challenge, which tasks the contestants from the first episode with presenting three looks for the Hide n Chic Ball. The runway categories are "Zebra Print Resort", evening wear with a leopard print, and a wedding gown with animal print, which must be made from scratch. The contestants from the second episode are tasked with presenting three looks for the Red, White and Blue Ball. The runway categories are "Red Hot Resort", solid white evening wear, and a wedding gown with red, white, and blue, which must be made from scratch. The contestants gather materials and begin to create their outfits. Some of the contestants talk about Maddy Morphosis's heterosexuality. Daya Betty eats a dragonfly after being dared by Kornbread Jeté. Willow Pill talks about her limited ability to use her hands because of a health condition and gets assistance from Kornbread Jeté.

On a new day, the contestants make final preparations for the fashion show. Orion Story talks about the suicide of her mother, who served as an inspiration for her runway presentation. Kerri Colby and Kornbread Jeté talk about their relationships with their families. Kornbread Jeté gets emotional and excuses herself from the Werk Room for a few minutes. In confessional footage, she talks about her experience leaving home and not being missed. On the main stage, RuPaul welcomes fellow judges Michelle Visage and Carson Kressley, as well as guest judge Christine Chiu. After the contestants present their looks, the judges deliver their critiques, deliberate, then share the results with the group. Angeria Paris VanMicheals, Jorgeous, and Willow Pill receive positive critiques, and Willow Pill wins the challenge. June Jambalaya, Maddy Morphosis, and Orion Story receive negative critiques, and Orion Story is deemed safe. June Jambalaya and Maddy Morphosis place in the bottom and face off in a lip-sync contest to "I Love It" (2020) by Kylie Minogue. Maddy Morphosis wins the lip-sync. June Jambalaya then opens her chocolate bar to reveal a plain chocolate bar and is eliminated from the competition.

== Production and broadcast ==
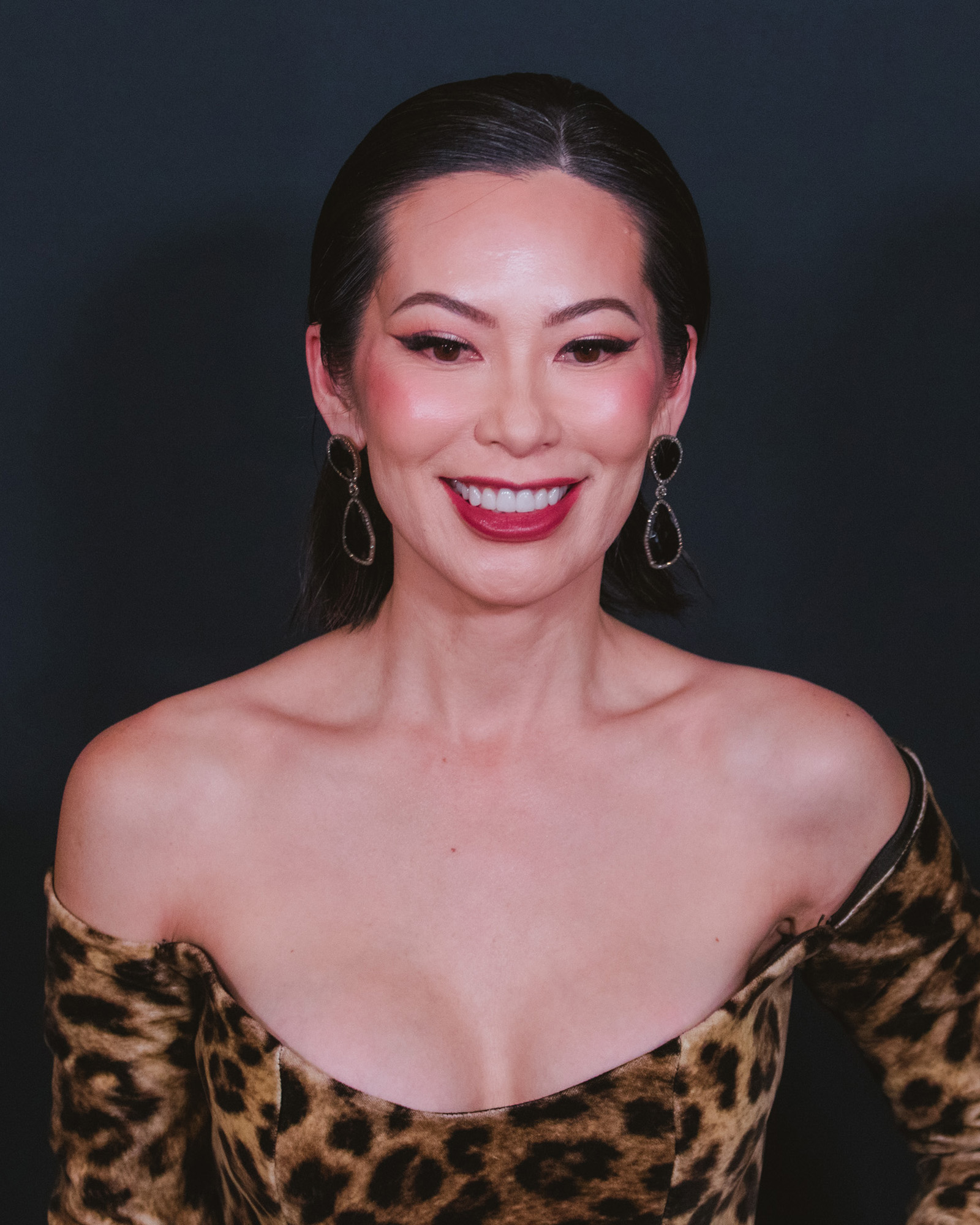
Christine Chiu (pictured in 2026) is a guest judge.

The episode originally aired on January 21, 2022. After June Jambalaya unwraps her chocolate bar, she says, "It's chocolate." She has said of her lip-sync performance, "I didn't feel my best performing. I knew it was messy and unpolished, and for that, my time to go."

=== Fashion ===
For the main stage, RuPaul wears a gold dress and a blonde wig.

The episode has multiple runway themes. For the "Zebra Print Resort" category of the Hide n Chic Ball, the contestants wear black-and-white striped outfits. Bosco has sunglasses and spikes on her head. Willow Pill has a short skirt, a red wig, and a purse. Kerri Colby has pink leggings and pink high-heeled shoes. Kornbread Jeté has a white bottom and a top with an animal print. Orion Story has tube socks. She carries a golf club. June Jambalaya's outfit has a red lining and she carries a matching handbag. For "Leopard Evening Wear", the contestants wear outfits with a leopard print. Alyssa Hunter wears a matching headpiece. Willow Pill wears a black leopard print with gold accents. Kerry Colby has a purple dress with a matching hat that spins. She carries a purse. Kornbread Jeté has a long black dress and an orange wig. Orion Story has long brown hair and part of a skull as a headpiece. June Jambalaya has a flowy outfit, large earrings, and a long ponytail. For "Animal Print Bridal Couture", Alyssa Hunter has a gold dress, gloves, and an orange wig. Bosco wears a zebra print and a dark wig. Willow Pill wears a pantsuit with a leopard print and a brown wig. Kerri Colby has a long dress, tall gold boots, and a head scarf. Kornbread Jeté has a blue-and-purple dress, black shoes, and a purple wig. Orion Story has a short dress, black gloves, and a short red wig. June Jambalaya's outfit has a cape and she carries a flower bouquet.

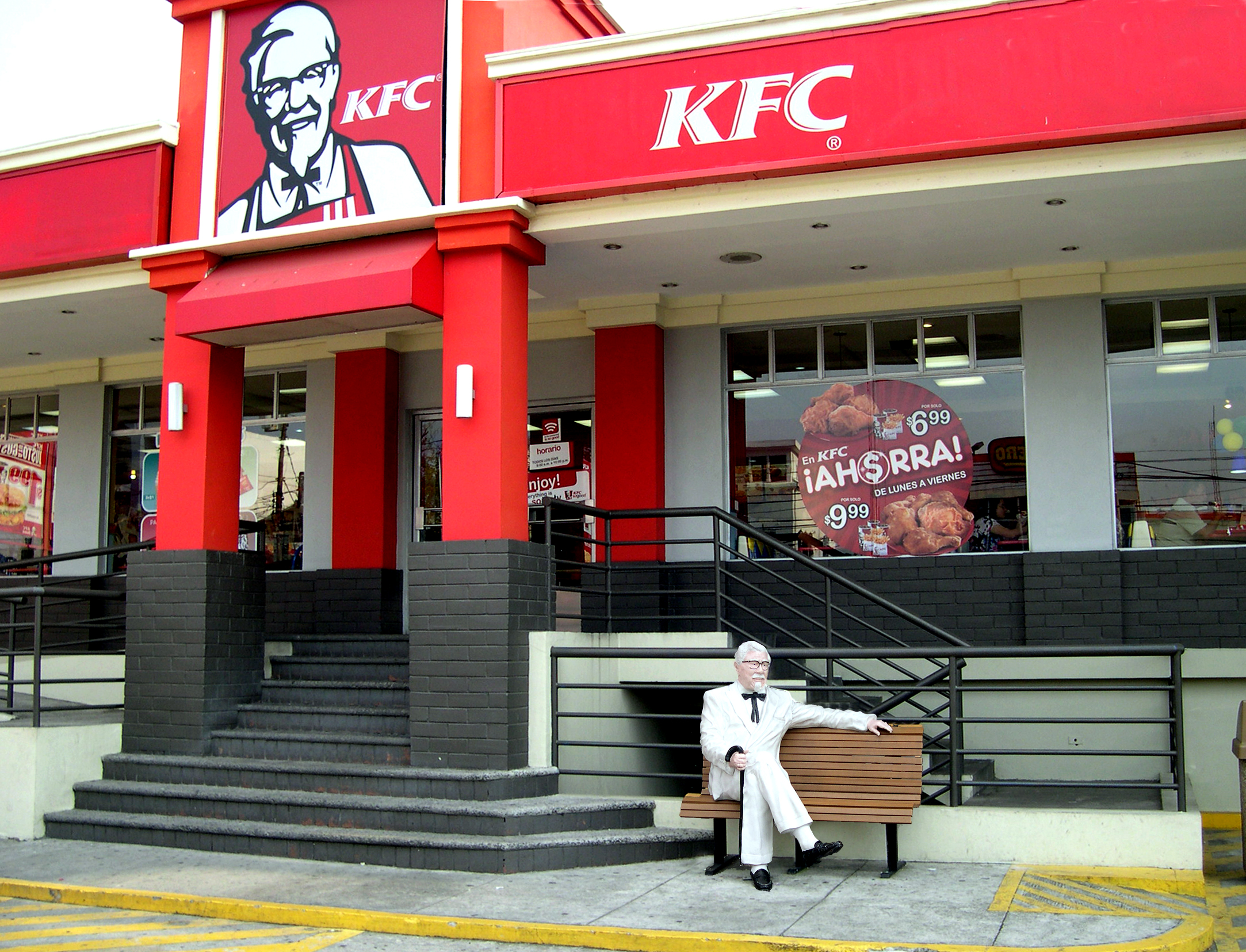
Willow Pill compares a look by Maddy Morphosis to Colonel Sanders, who is affiliated with the restaurant chain KFC.

For the "Red Hot Resort" category of the Red, White and Blue Ball, the contestants wear red outfits. Daya Betty wears a red-and-white outfit, red leggings, and a blonde wig. Angeria Paris VanMichaels wears a 1960s-inspired baby doll dress. DeJa Skye has a floor-length dress and a purple wig. Jasmine Kennedie has a 1950s-inspired dress, red sunglasses, and crustacean claws. Jorgeous has a short dress and a brown wig. Lady Camden's outfit has gold accents, sunglasses, and a red head wrap. Maddy Morphosis has pants and a red purse. For the evening wear category, Daya Betty has a white outfit and a blonde wig. Angeria Paris VanMichaels wears a jumpsuit, long white nails, and a long dark wig. DeJa Skye has wide-legged pants, white gloves, and a dark wig. Jasmine Kennedie wears a short cocktail dress and a long red wig. Jorgeous has a long white dress with a slit on one side. She has a long ponytail. Lady Camden has a large bow on her dress. She wears a long dark wig and a white fascinator. Maddy Morphosis's outfit has a celestial theme. For the "Red White & Blue Bridal Couture" category, Daya Betty wears a dress with ruffles, white shoes, and a red wig. Angeria Paris VanMichaels has a sequined gown and a dark wig. DeJa Skye's dress is mostly red and has sashes. Her wig is dark. Jasmine Kennedie has a large star on one of her shoulders. She carries a flower bouquet. Gorgeous has stars on her dress. Lady Camden's outfit also has stars and a veil. Her wig is dark. Maddy Morphosis's look is inspired by the county fair. During the episode, Willow Pill compares Maddy Morphosis's look to Colonel Sanders.

== Reception and impact ==
Paul McCallion of Vulture rated the episode four out of five stars. June Jambalaya saying "It's chocolate" prompted an "iconic" meme, according to Out magazine. For the week ending January 27, 2022, "I Love It" saw a 671 percent increase in the total number of streams from the week ending January 20.
