= Moulin Ru: The Rusical =

- RuPaul's Drag Race episode
- Episode no.: Season 14; Episode 12
- Directed by: Nick Murray
- Presented by: RuPaul
- Original air date: March 25, 2022

Guest appearances
- Andra Day; Leslie Jordan; Leland

Episode chronology
← Previous "An Extra Special Episode"	Next → "The Ross Mathews Roast"

"Moulin Ru: The Rusical" is the twelfth episode for the fourteenth season of American reality competition television series RuPaul's Drag Race, and the 187th episode overall. It first aired in on cable network VH1 on March 25, 2022, and was followed by an episode of the companion series RuPaul's Drag Race: Untucked.

The episode's main challenge tasks the contestants with performing a Rusical (musical theatre production) parody of the musical Moulin Rouge! The Rusical features guest appearances by producer Leland and actor Leslie Jordan. American singer Andra Day is a guest judge, alongside regular panelists RuPaul, Michelle Visage, and Ross Mathews. Lady Camden is declared the winner of the main challenge. No one was eliminated from the competition after Bosco was saved due to a game twist; she was placed in the bottom two and lost a lip-sync contest against Jorgeous to "Heartbreak Hotel" (1998) by singer Whitney Houston.

The episode earned a nomination by Nick Murray for Outstanding Directing for a Reality Program category at the 74th Primetime Creative Arts Emmy Awards. For their conflict over the role of Saltine in the Rusical, Bosco and Lady Camden won in the Best Fight category at the 2022 MTV Movie & TV Awards

== Episode ==
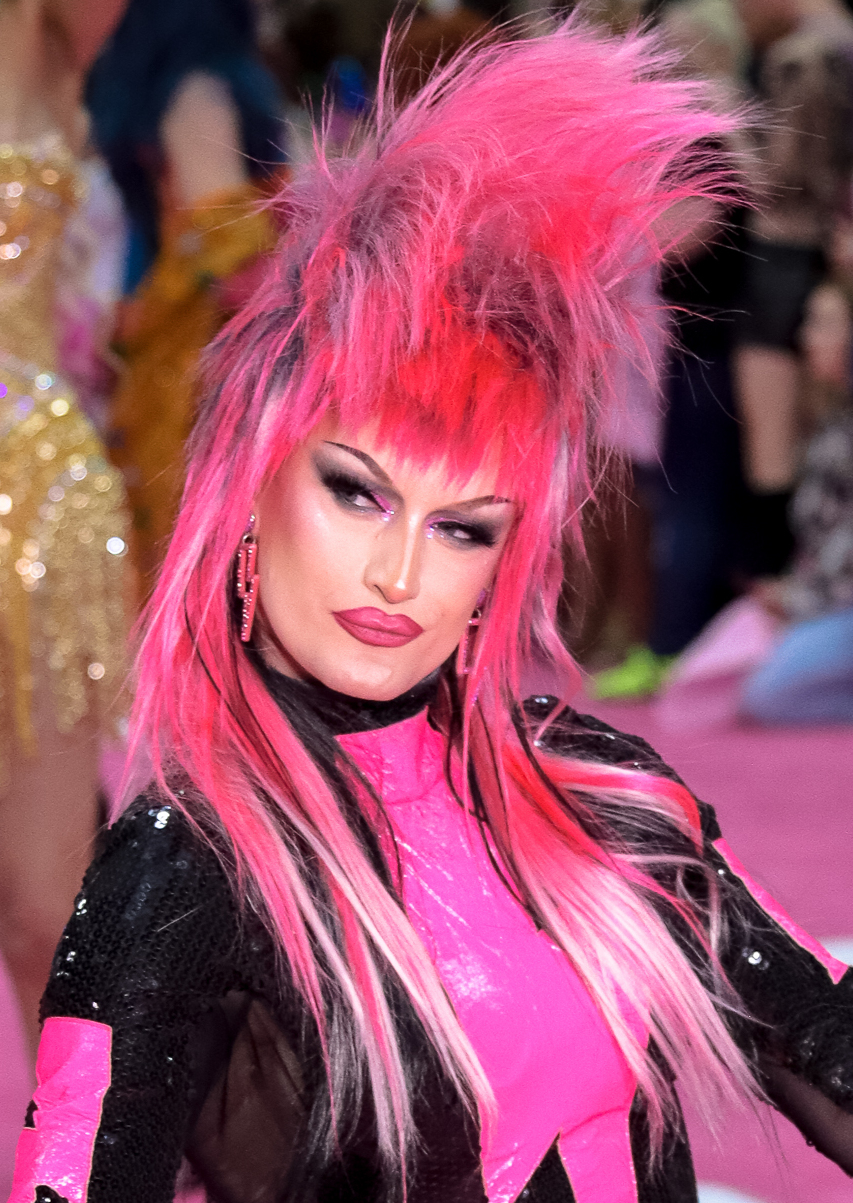
Lady Camden (pictured at RuPaul's DragCon LA in 2023) wins the episode's main challenge.

The contestants return to the Werk Room after the elimination of Jasmine Kennedie on the previous episode. RuPaul greets the group and reveals the main challenge, which tasks contestants with performing a Rusical (musical theatre production) parody-tribute to the musical Moulin Rouge! The contestants choose which characters to play. Bosco and Lady Camden fight for the role of Saltine. After deliberating, the contestants decide on the following cast:

- Angeria Paris VanMicheals as Charisma
- Bosco as Saltine
- Daya Betty as Uniqueness
- DeJa Skye as Nerve
- Jorgeous as Talent
- Lady Camden as Mama Z
- Willow Pill as Green Fairy

Angeria Paris VanMicheals reassures Lady Camden, who is disappointed for not getting a preferred role. On the main stage, the contestants rehearse with guest director Leslie Jordan, composer and musician Leland, and choreographer Miguel Zarate. Back in the Werk Room, the contestants prepare for the performance.

On the main stage, RuPaul welcomes regular panelists Michelle Visage and Ross Mathews, as well as guest judge Andra Day. The judges watch the Rusical. RuPaul then reveals the runway category: "Mirror, Mirror". The contestants present their looks on the runway, then the judges deliver their critiques. RuPaul asks the contestants who they think should be eliminated from the competition. The judges deliberate while the contestants wait backstage, then share the results with the group. Lady Camden is declared the winner of the main challenge, while Bosco and Jorgeous place in the bottom. After facing off in a lip-sync contest to "Heartbreak Hotel (Hex Hector Remix)" by Whitney Houston, Jorgeous is declared a winner. However, Bosco is saved from elimination because of the "Golden Candy Bar" twist introduced early in the season.

== Production ==
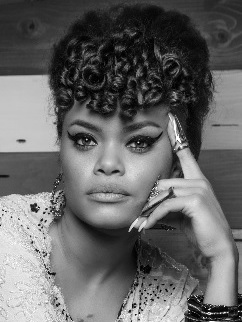
Andra Day is a guest judge.

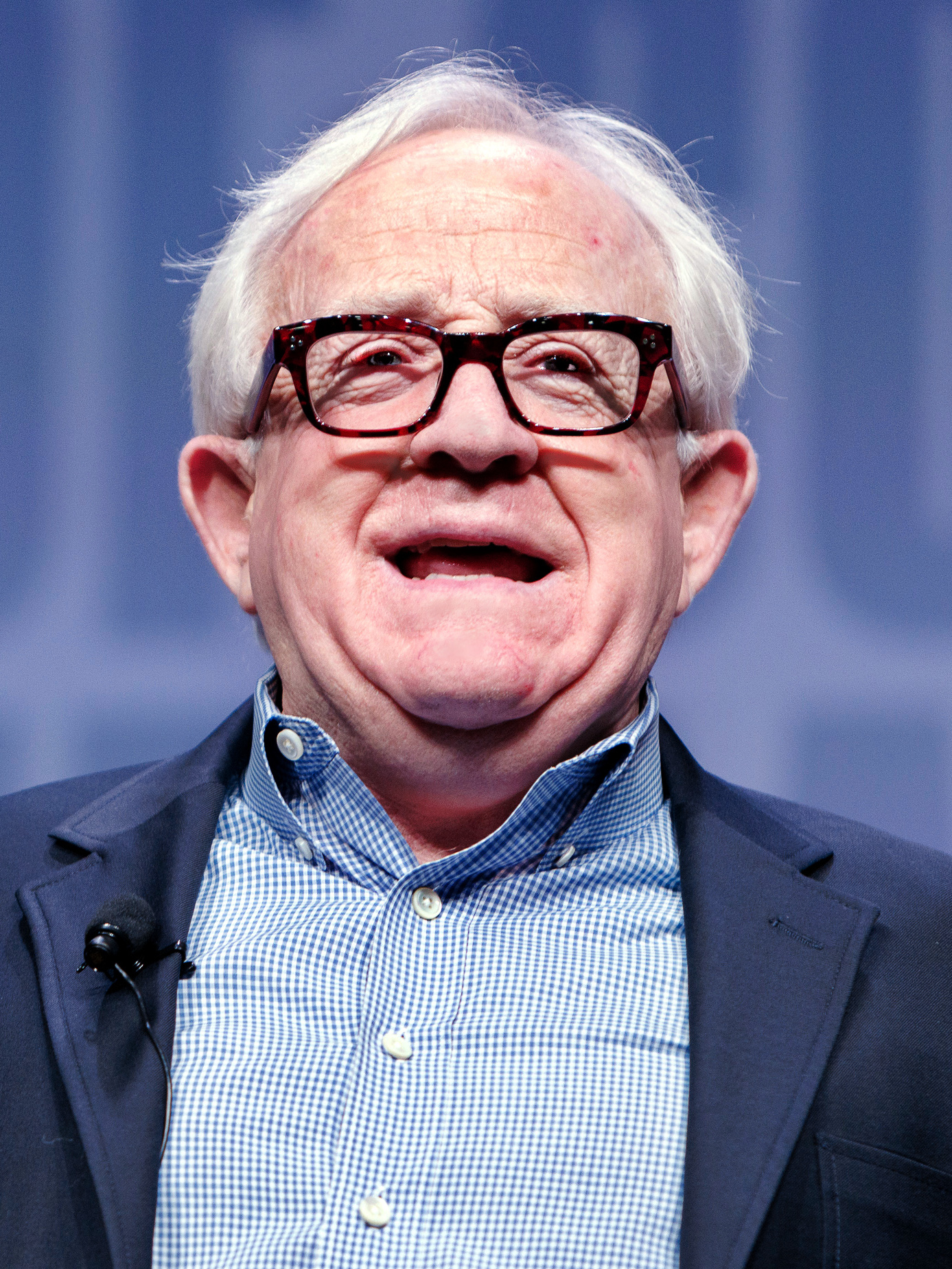
Leslie Jordan (pictured in 2022) is a guest director of the Rusical, also playing the part of Duke of Dickington.

The episode was directed by Nick Murray and originally aired on March 25, 2022.

The Rusical features lyrics from songs by RuPaul. Gabe Lopez produced the music. Leland also assists with the vocal recording process. Leland and Jordan appear in the musical, portraying Christian and the Duke of Dickington, respectively.

=== Fashion ===
For the Rusical, Angeria Paris VanMicheals wears a purple dress and she has purple hair. Daya Betty wears a pink outfit with a matching hat and a blonde wig. DeJa Skye's outfit is black. Jorgeous wears a gold outfit with matching boots. Lady Camden has a red outfit, a black hat, and a blonde wig. She carries a cane. Bosco's outfit is black and white. She has black high-heeled shoes and a white fascinator. As the Duke of Dickington, Jordan has a suit a top hat, and a cane. Willow Pill has a green outfit with matching boots and gloves, as well as wings and a blonde wig.

For the fashion show, Lady Camden presents an outfit inspired by The Little Prince. Bosco's outfit has many pieces, some of which have spikes. Willow Pill's 1970s-inspired silver outfit has fireworks on the back. She wears a black wig. Angeria Paris VanMicheals has a dress with many light blue reflective scales. Daya Betty's Kiss-inspired outfit has many spikes and her hair is black. DeJa Skye wears large shoulder pads, a purple wig, and a crown. Jorgeous presents a look inspired by Cardi B. She has latex boots and gloves, and short "wet" hair.

On social media, season contestant June Jambalaya shared what she would have worn for the episode's final runway had she still been in the competition.

== Reception and recognition ==
Stephen Daw of Billboard wrote, "Season 14's installment of the annual Rusical challenge was, to borrow a phrase, spectacular-spectacular. With a clear-cut concept, some entertaining takes on RuPaul originals and a series of show-stopping performances, Moulin Ru will go down as one of the best Rusicals in the show's herstory, come what may." Nola Ojomu of PinkNews said "the Rusical "was hailed one of the best ever". Xtra Magazine's Kevin O’Keeffe called "Moulin Ru" "an absolute blast, and one of my favourite Rusicals ever". He wrote, "Yes, it's another instance of Ru songs being remixed. But unlike in other cases, it makes sense here: Moulin Rouge! is all about mashing up and covering classic pop songs. Of course the Rusical version would have to feature Ru songs."

Cameron Scheetz ranked "Heartbreak Hotel" ninth in Queerty's list of the season's ten best lip-syncs, writing: "By this point, we'd already seen Jorgeous smash three competitive lip-syncs, so you might think her performances would start to grow stale, but you should never doubt the dancing diva of Nashville." Scheetz continued, "The show-stopping moment comes when she pops her body and twirls her arms in time with the remixed breakdown before the chorus, making it clear who'd be unwrapping their chocolate bar that night."

The episode earned Nick Murray a nomination in the Outstanding Directing for a Reality Program category at the 74th Primetime Creative Arts Emmy Awards. Bosco and Lady Camden won in the Best Fight category at the 2022 MTV Movie & TV Awards. While accepting the award, Bosco said, "I would like to thank Lady Camden for not being here so I could accept this alone. And I would like to thank all of you for apparently enjoying gay people!"

== Soundtrack album ==
Moulin Ru! the Rusical!

Soundtrack album by The Cast of RuPaul's Drag Race, Season 14
- Released: March 26, 2022
- Recorded: 2021
- Genre: Dance
- Length: 11:46
- Label: World of Wonder

Alongside the airing of the episode, a 12-track soundtrack album was released with the music from the Rusical on March 26, 2022.

No.	Title	Length
1.	"Welcome to the Moulin Ru"	1:06
2.	"Charisma, Uniqueness, Nerve and Talent Interlude"	0:36
3.	"Jaloux De Ma Gelée"	1:41
4.	"Money Money Money"	1:25
5.	"Penniless Writer Interlude"	0:33
6.	"Love Medley"	1:18
7.	"Duke of Dickington Interlude"	0:21
8.	"Covergirl Tango"	1:25
9.	"Absinthe Interlude"	0:34
10.	"Green Fairy"	1:33
11.	"I Choose Myself Interlude"	0:34
12.	"Welcome to the Moulin Ru (Reprise)"	0:40
Total length:		11:46
