= Lip Sync LaLaPaRuZa =

The Lip Sync LaLaPaRuZa is a challenge in the Drag Race franchise where contestants lip sync against each other in multiple rounds. It could refer to any of these episodes:

- "An Extra Special Episode", where the challenge is called a Lip Sync LaLaPaRuZa
- "Global Lip Sync Lalaparuza", an episode of RuPaul's Drag Race Global All Stars
- "LaLaPaRuZa", an episode of RuPaul's Drag Race All Stars season 4
- "Lip Sync LaLaPaRuza Smackdown (RuPaul's Drag Race season 15)"
- "Lip Sync Lalaparuza Smackdown (RuPaul's Drag Race season 17)"
- "Lip Sync LaLaPaRuZa Smackdown", an episode of RuPaul's Drag Race All Stars season 7
- "Lip-Sync LaLaPaRuZa Smackdown", an episode of RuPaul's Drag Race All Stars season 9
- "Lip Sync LaLaPaRuza Smackdown – Reunited"

== See also ==
- "Lip Synch Extravaganza Eleganza", an episode of RuPaul's Drag Race.
