= Water Me =

Water Me may refer to:

- "Water Me" (Bonnie Pink song), 2007
- "Water Me" (FKA Twigs song), 2013
- "Water Me" (Lizzo song), 2017
