= Big Opening Number 2 =

- RuPaul's Drag Race episode
- Episode no.: Season 14; Episode 2
- Presented by: RuPaul

Guest appearance
- Alicia Keys

Episode chronology
| ← Previous "Big Opening Number 1" | Next → "A Pair of Balls" |

"Big Opening #2" is the second episode of the fourteenth season of RuPaul's Drag Race. It originally aired on January 14, 2022. The episode's main challenge tasks the contestants with performing in a talent show. Alicia Keys is a guest judge. Angeria Paris VanMicheals wins the main challenge. Daya Betty is eliminated from the competition after placing in the bottom and losing a lip-sync contest against DeJa Skye to "Fallin'" (2001) by Keys.

== Episode ==
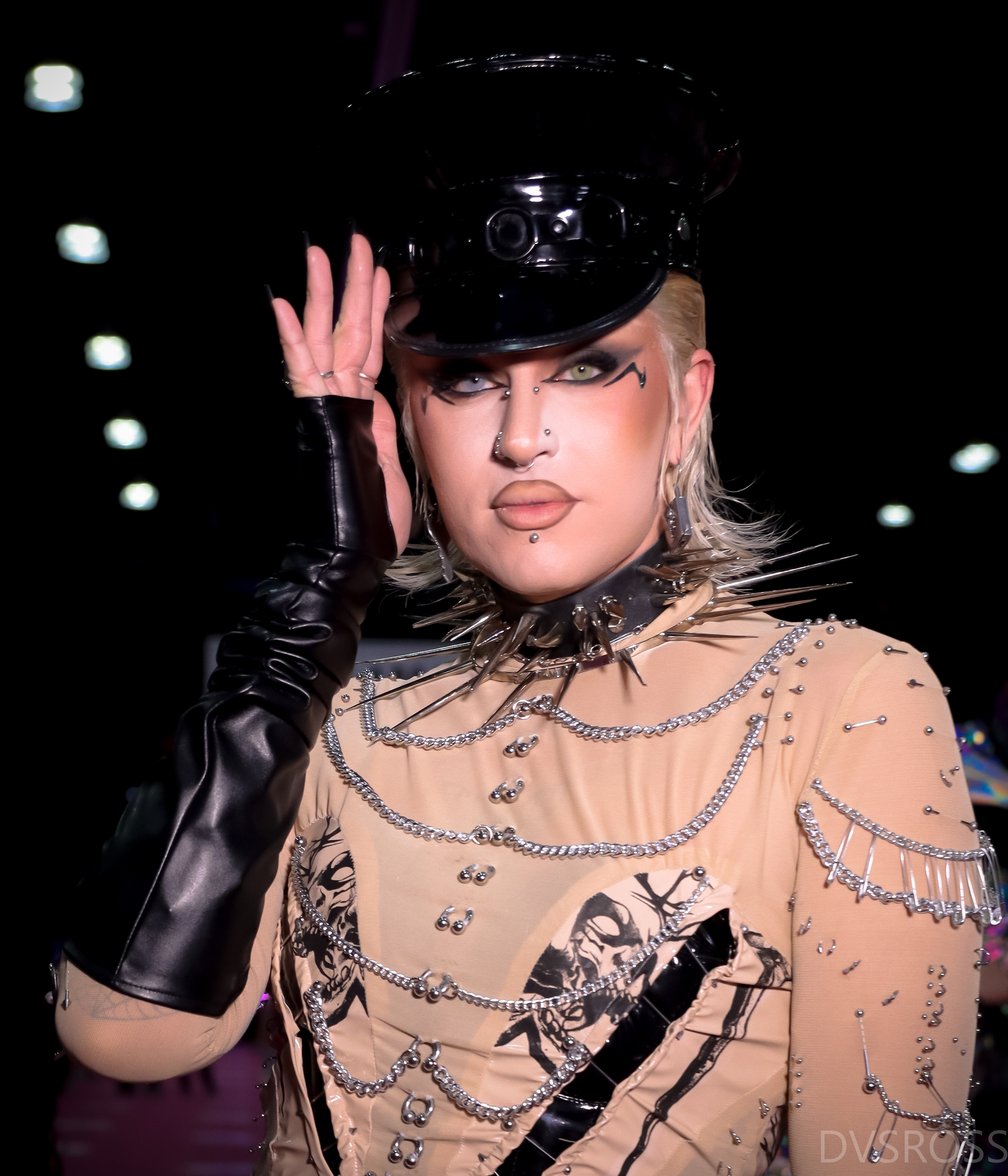
Daya Betty (pictured at RuPaul's DragCon LA in 2023) is eliminated from the competition.

The remaining seven contestants enter the Werk Room. RuPaul greets the group and reveals the mini-challenge, which tasks the contestants with participating in a photo shoot in a bowl of Tic Tacs. Angeria Paris VanMicheals wins the mini-challenge. RuPaul then reveals the main challenge, which tasks the contestants with performing in a talent show for the judges. Following are the contestants and their acts:

- Angeria Paris VanMicheals – original song
- Daya Betty – lip-syncing
- DeJa Skye – cheerleading comedy routine
- Jasmine Kennedie – lip-syncing and dancing
- Jorgeous – lip-syncing
- Lady Camden – ballet routine
- Maddy Morphosis – electric guitar

In the Werk Room, the contestants discuss Maddy Morphosis's heterosexuality. Alicia Keys is a guest judge. The runway category is "Sickening Signature Drag". Angeria Paris VanMicheals, Jorgeous, and Lady Camden receive positive critiques, and Angeria Paris VanMicheals wins the main challenge. Daya Betty, DeJa Skye, and Maddy Morphosis receive negative critiques, and Maddy Morphosis is deemed safe. Daya Betty and DeJa Skye place in the bottom and face off in a lip-sync contest to "Fallin'" (2001) by Alicia Keys. DeJa Skye wins the lip-sync and Daya Betty is eliminated from the competition.

== Production and broadcast ==
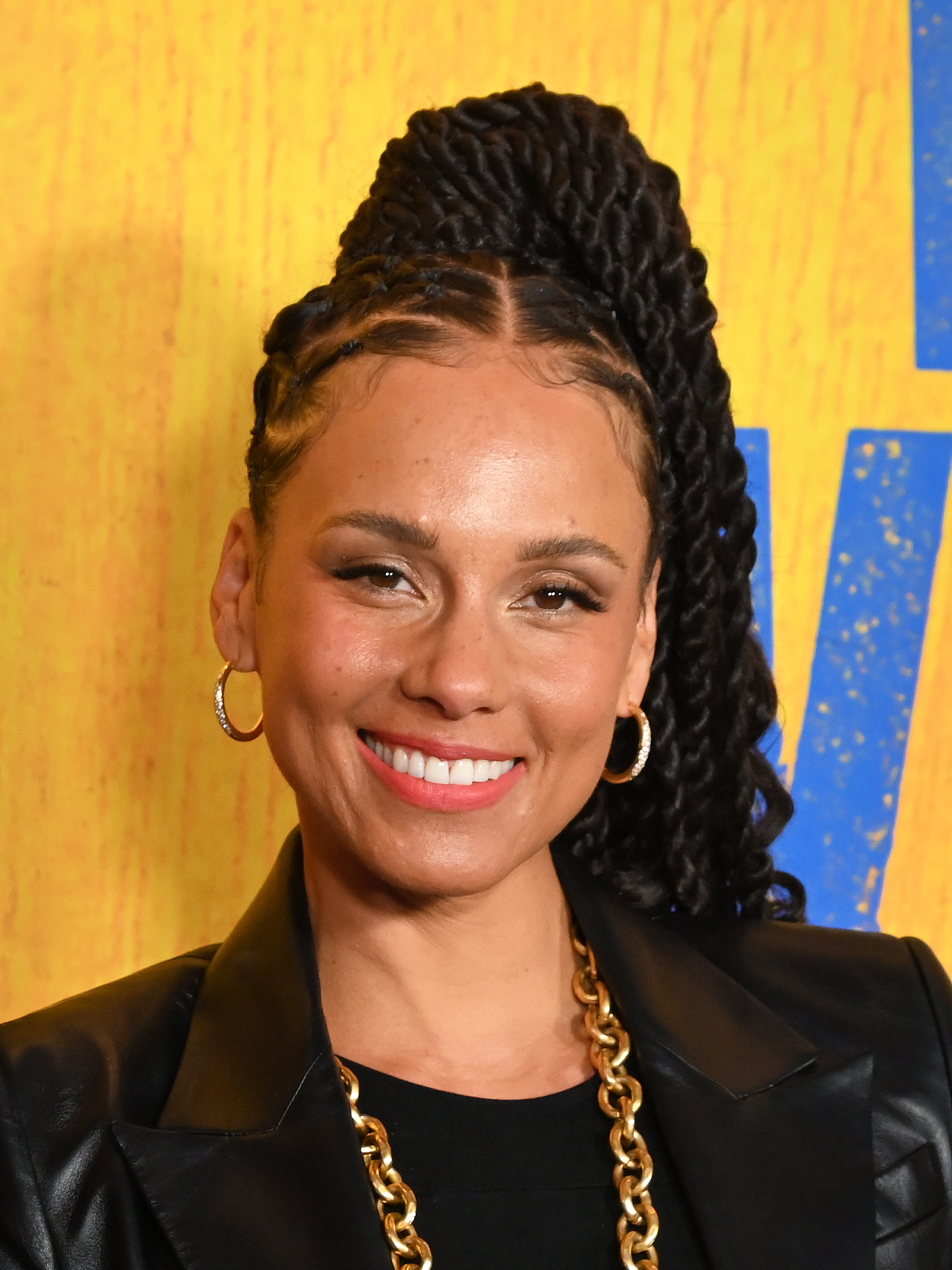
Alicia Keys (pictured in 2025) is a guest judge.

The episode originally aired on January 14, 2022.

Keys's appearance in one of the Werk Room mirrors recreates a similar appearance by four contestants on the second season of RuPaul's Drag Race All Stars.

=== Fashion ===
Nylon described Daya Betty's entrance look as a black-and-yellow dress inspired by Jem and the Holograms.

== Reception ==
Trae DeLellis of The A.V. Club gave the episode a rating of 'B-'. Jake Dee included Keys in Screen Rant's 2022 list of the season's guest judges, writing: "Keys was among the most humble, entertaining, and knowledgable celebrity guest judges in season 14. In addition to weighing in on one of the best lip-sync performances of the season between Daya Betty and DeJa's rendition of her own hit song 'Fallin,' Alicia imparts genuinely encouraging pearls of wisdom all the queens can take with them after the show." Dee continued, "Beyond being incredibly kind and gracious in the way she critiques the performances of her hit song, Alicia's successful track record gives her advice more weight. Despite failing to gain the same viewership ratings as the season premiere, "The Big Opening Part 2" still ranks as the 4th-highest of the season (per showbuzzdaily.com), reinforcing Alicia's superior judging presence." Stephen Daw of Billboard said DeJa Skye's "embodiment of the song edged her out just enough to earn her place back". Michael Cuby of Nylon described her performance as "emotional" and "infectious". Jordan Robledo of Gay Times called her performance "passionate".
