= The Grand Opening =

The Grand Opening or Grand Opening may refer to:

- Grand opening

== Music ==
- The Grand Opening (band), the musical alias of the Swedish musician John Roger Olsson
- The Grand Opening (album), a 2004 album by Planet Asia
- Grand Opening (album), a 1994 album by Geggy Tah
- "Grand Opening", a song by Oh Land
- "Grand Opening", a song by Psapp from the EP Rear Moth

== Television ==
- "The Grand Opening" (What We Do in the Shadows), an episode of the American TV series What We Do in the Shadows
- "The Grand Opening" (The Jeffersons), an episode of the American TV series The Jeffersons
