= Water Me (Lizzo song) =

2017 single by Lizzo

Single by Lizzo
- Released: August 18, 2017
- Genre: Funk-pop; electropop
- Length: 3:06
- Label: Atlantic; Nice Life
- Songwriters: Clarence Coffee Jr.; E. Kidd Bogart; Eric Frederic; Farhad Samadzada; Melissa Jefferson; Morris Wittenberg; Nneka Lucia Egbuna; Tobias Wincorn
- Producers: Ricky Reed; Tobias Wincorn (add.)

Lizzo singles chronology
"Phone" (2017)	"Water Me" (2017)	"Truth Hurts" (2017)

Music video
- "Water Me" on YouTube

"Water Me" is a song by American singer and rapper Lizzo, released as a single on August 18, 2017. It was written by Clarence Coffee Jr., E. Kidd Bogart, Ricky Reed, Farhad Samadzada, Lizzo, Morris Wittenberg, Nneka Lucia Egbuna and Tobias Wincorn. Reed handled the production, with Wincorn as an additional producer. The song was later included on the deluxe edition of Lizzo's 2019 album Cuz I Love You.

== Composition ==
"Water Me" contains lyrics about body positivity, self-love and freedom.

The song's chorus is based on re-interpreted lyrics from the opening lines of a children's anti-drug song titled "I Am Free, No Dope For Me" written by Morris Wittenberg and recorded by Latin soul group The Dynamics in 1970. The song itself also uses samples from Nigerian singer Nneka's 2011 single "My Home" (from her fourth album Soul Is Heavy); both Nneka and producer Farhad Samadzada received credits as co-writers.

== Usage in media ==
"Water Me" was featured in the 2018 film Blockers, as well as the 2018 dance rhythm game Just Dance 2019. In 2019, Walmart used the song in their Black Friday commercial making the song become more known and leading to many Shazam searches and a new TikTok challenge.

The song was also featured in the season 14 premiere of RuPaul's Drag Race in a lip sync between June Jambalaya and Orion Story, as Lizzo herself was guest judging the episode.

== Music video ==
The music video for "Water Me" was directed by Quinn Wilson and Asha Efia. It features people nourishing themselves with water and shots of sprinklers and bath tubs. The end of the video shows dinner being served. A headpiece on the dinner table shows a picture of Lizzo posing with everyone. In an interview with The Fader, Lizzo said, "'Water Me' is a labor of love. I pride myself on how quickly I can finish a song but this took 7 months! It's about needing nourishment, it's about being loved for who you are. The video concept was a collaboration from my bad ass creative team: me, Andy Madeline, Quinn Wilson and Asha Efia. We're celebrating black beauty and the meaningful freedom of water," she stated.

== Credits and personnel ==
Credits adapted from Tidal

- Lizzo – vocalist, songwriter, synthesizer
- Ricky Reed – songwriter, producer, bass guitarist, drummer, programmer, synthesizer
- Tobias Wincorn – songwriter, additional producer
- Clarence Coffee Jr. – songwriter, additional vocalist
- E. Kidd Bogart – songwriter
- Farhad Samadzada – songwriter
- Morris Wittenberg – songwriter
- Nneka Lucia Egbuna – songwriter
- Ethan Shumaker – engineer

== Charts ==
Chart (2019)	Peak position
US Digital Song Sales (Billboard)	19
US R&B/Hip-Hop Digital Song Sales (Billboard)	4

== Release history ==
Country	Date	Format	Label	Ref.
Various	August 18, 2017	Digital download; streaming	Atlantic; Nice Life	
