= An Extra Special Episode =

- RuPaul's Drag Race episode
- Episode no.: Season 14; Episode 11
- Original air date: March 18, 2022

Episode chronology
← Previous "Snatch Game"	Next → "Moulin Ru: The Rusical"

"An Extra Special Episode" is the eleventh episode of the fourteenth season of the American television series RuPaul's Drag Race. It originally aired on March 18, 2022. The episode has seven contestants compete in a series of lip-sync contests to determine who would be eliminated from the competition. Jasmine Kennedie is eliminated after losing a final match against Bosco.

== Episode ==
External media
- Daya Betty & Jasmine Kennedie’s “Respect” Lip Sync 😱 on YouTube
- Willow Pill & Bosco’s Luther Vandross Lip Sync 😍 on YouTube
- Jorgeous, Angeria, & Lady Camden’s Epic Beyoncé Lip Sync 😍 on YouTube
- Bosco & Lady Camden Lip Sync To An En Vogue Classic! 👯‍♀️ on YouTube
- Angeria Paris VanMicheals & Jasmine Kennedie Lip Sync To J.Lo 🍑 on YouTube
- Bosco & Jasmine Kennedie’s Diana Ross Lip Sync ⭐️ on YouTube

The bottom seven contestants from last week compete in a series of lip-sync contests called the LaLaPaRUza Smackdown to determine who will be eliminated. A Pit Crew member spins a cage and selects a ball with a contestants initials on it, to determine who will lip-sync first. They will then choose who they want to lip-sync against. The contestant who gets chosen, will then choose a lip-sync song. This will continue on until the last two remaining lip-sync one last time.

In the first round, Jasmine Kennedie gets picked first and chooses Daya Betty to lip-sync against. Daya Betty selects "Respect" by Aretha Franklin and wins the contest. Willow Pill is next to be picked, and chooses to compete against Bosco. Bosco chooses "Never Too Much" (1981) by Luther Vandross and Willow Pill wins the contest. The final three contestants (Angeria Paris VanMicheals, Jorgeous, and Lady Camden) lip-sync last. The Pit Crew chooses Jorgeous' name and she picks "Radio" (2008) by Beyoncé. Jorgeous wins the lip-sync.

In the second round, Lady Camden gets picked first and chooses to compete against Bosco. Bosco chooses "Don't Let Go (Love)" (1996) by En Vogue and Lady Camden wins the contest. Angeria Paris VanMicheals and Jasmine Kennedie face off to "Love Don't Cost a Thing" (2000) by Jennifer Lopez. Angeria Paris VanMicheals wins the lip-sync. In the final round, Bosco and Jasmine Kennedie face off to "Swept Away" (1984) by Diana Ross. Bosco wins the lip-sync. Jasmine Kennedie then opens her chocolate bar to reveal a plain chocolate bar and is eliminated from the competition.

== Production and broadcast ==
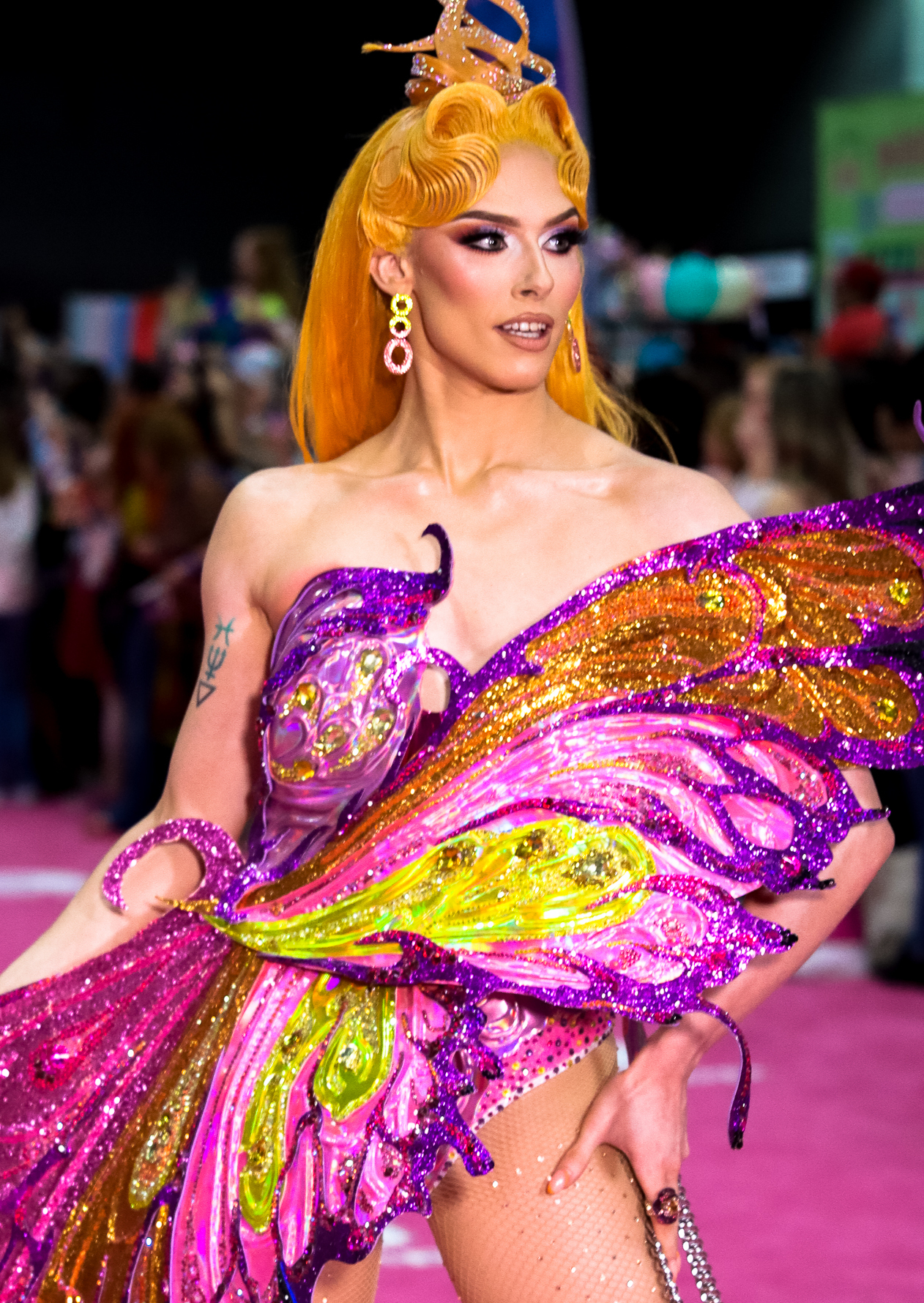
Jasmine Kennedie (pictured at RuPaul's DragCon LA in 2023) is eliminated from the competition.

The episode originally aired on March 18, 2022.

Unlike most episodes, no other contestants are on the stage when one is eliminated from the competition. Trae DeLellis of The A.V. Club said Jasmine Kennedie's departure "felt a little cheapened by the absence of the other queens". DeLellis opined, "Producers really should have had all the queens return before announcing the winner of the Jasmine-Bosco lip sync. Jasmine exiting completely alone felt like a disservice to a queen that initially came off as annoying and really persevered with a great attitude and desire to grow and learn. At the very least, we deserved to see a hug between her and Daya Betty."

== Reception and impact ==
Trae DeLellis of The A.V. Club gave the episode a rating of 'B+'.

Cameron Scheetz included some of the performances in Queerty's list of the season's ten best lip-syncs. Mikelle Street included Lady Camden's performance to "Don't Let Go (Love)" in Out magazine's list of nine lip-syncs on the show "that prove you don't need stunts and reveals". Street said the tournament "had the stakes sky high but battle after battle, the queens delivered" and opined, "though Lady Camden's match up with Bosco went viral for a specific camera shot that captured both of the queens and then went back and forth on focus between the pair, that shot was made all the more powerful by Camden's performance. The English performer truly connected with the track and we didn't want to let go." Michelle Konopka Alonzo of Screen Rant called the contest "legendary".

Sam Damshenas of Gay Times said the "Love Don't Cost a Thing" contest "had the most puzzling outcome". Stephen Daw of IN Magazine said the performances to "Swept Away" were "sexy" and "sultry". The song saw a 2,809 percent increase in streams after the episode aired.
