= Orion Story =

American drag performer (born 1996)

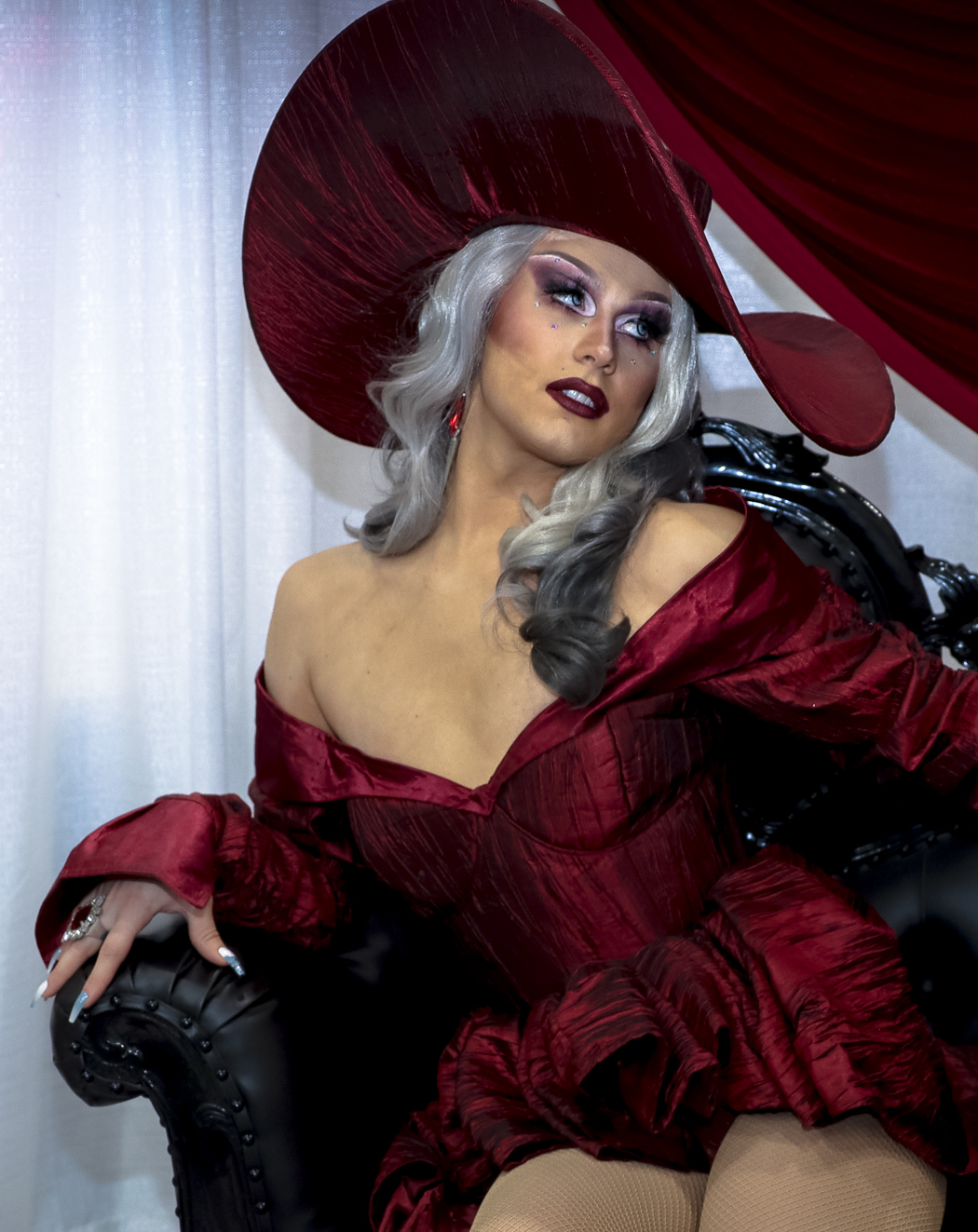
- Orion Story at RuPaul's DragCon LA, 2022
- Born: Chance Lambert; June 25, 1996 (age 30); Grand Rapids, Michigan, U.S.
- Occupation: Drag queen
- Television: RuPaul's Drag Race (season 14)

Orion Story is the stage name of Chance Lambert (born June 25, 1996), an American drag performer who competed on the fourteenth season of RuPaul's Drag Race.

== Early life ==
Chance Lambert was born and raised in Grand Rapids, Michigan. He also lived in Spring Lake.

== Career ==
Lambert began performing in drag at Hamburger Mary's and Rumors Nightclub.

Lambert competed as Orion Story on the fourteenth season of RuPaul's Drag Race. Orion Story was the first contestant on the series from Michigan. She was eliminated in the first episode, after placing in the bottom two and losing a lip-sync battle against June Jambalaya to Lizzo's 2017 song "Water Me". After Orion Story and Daya Betty were invited to re-enter the competition, Orion Story was eliminated again in the fifth episode. While filming, she had an unaired "budding romance" with fellow contestant Jorgeous.

== Personal life ==
Lambert lives in Cedar Springs, Michigan, as of 2022. He has said he was going through drug withdrawals during the filming of Drag Race. He has also credited the show for pulling him out of homelessness and substance abuse. His drag is inspired by his mother, who died by suicide. Lambert started drag as a tribute to his mother, whose maiden name is "Story".

Orion Story had approximately 104,000 followers on Instagram as of May 2024.

== Filmography ==
- RuPaul's Drag Race
- Bring Back My Girls (2023)
