= Jasmine Kennedie =

American drag performer

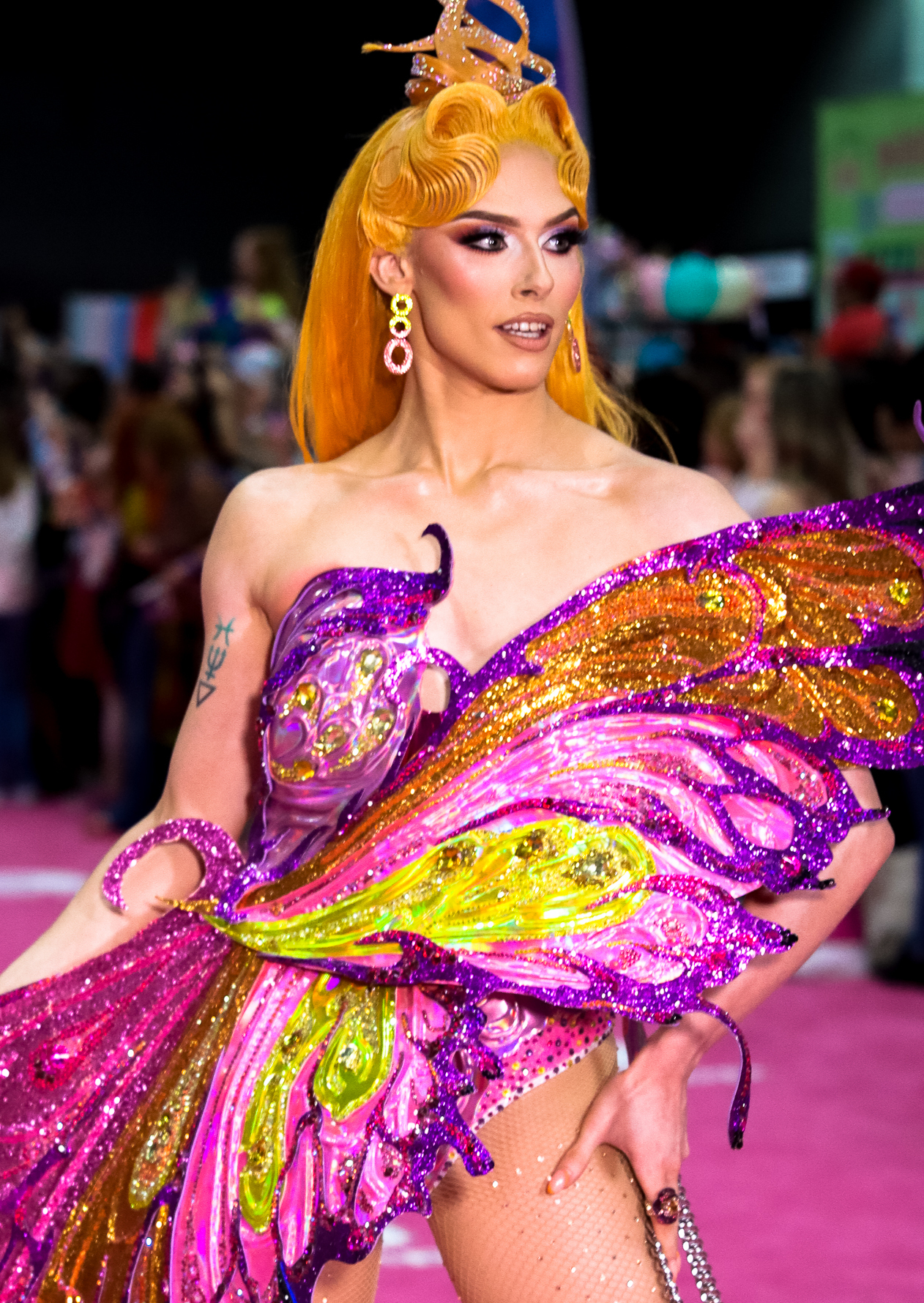
- Jasmine Kennedie at RuPaul's DragCon LA, 2023
- Born: May 22, 1999 (age 27); Binghamton, New York, U.S.
- Education: Fashion Institute of Technology
- Television: RuPaul's Drag Race (season 14)
- Website: jasminekennedie.com

Jasmine Kennedie (born on May 22, 1999) is an American drag performer most known for competing on season 14 of RuPaul's Drag Race and season 11 of RuPaul's Drag Race All Stars.

== Early life ==
Kennedie was raised in Binghamton, New York and Morgantown, West Virginia. She attended high school at Maine-Endwell High School in Endwell, New York. Her mother's name is Joy. Her drag name comes from the character Jasmine in Aladdin and John F. Kennedy, changing the "y" in her surname to "ie"; her first drag name was Jasmine Rikers.

== Career ==
She first appeared in public drag at age 15-16 during a Halloween party that took place at the Endwell Fire Department, where she dressed up as a Hooters girl.

She competed on season 14 of RuPaul's Drag Race. She placed eighth overall after being eliminated in the eleventh episode LaLaPaRuza lip sync smackdown and attracted attention from viewers for her fights with fellow contestants Maddy Morphosis and Daya Betty.

In June 2023, Kennedie returned to Drag Race as a lip-sync assassin, appearing on the fifth episode of season 8 of RuPaul's Drag Race All Stars. She defeated top all star Jimbo in a lip sync to Dua Lipa's "Hallucinate". However, owing to Heidi N Closet's decision to leave the competition earlier in the episode, Kennedie did not eliminate either of the bottom two queens as the lip sync winner typically would.

In April 2026, Kennedie was announced to be competing on the eleventh season of RuPaul's Drag Race All Stars in the third bracket. She is the sole representative of Drag Race's fourteenth season.

== Personal life ==
Jasmine Kennedie was previously based in Brooklyn, New York City, now Washington, D.C. She came out as a trans woman during the filming of Drag Race. She received praise from civil rights groups for deciding to come out on a popular television show, according to CNN. Before doing drag, Jasmine played soccer for eight years, as well as swimming and diving for three additional years. She was diagnosed with ADHD.

== Filmography ==
=== Television ===
Year	Title	Role	Place	Ref
2022	RuPaul's Drag Race (season 14)	Herself	Contestant (8th place)	
2022	RuPaul's Drag Race: Untucked	Herself	Contestant (8th place)	
2023	RuPaul's Drag Race All Stars	Herself	Lip Sync Assassin; Episode: "Snatch Game of Love"	
2023	RuPaul's Drag Race All Stars: Untucked	Herself	Guest; Episode: "All Stars Untucked: Snatch Game of Love"	

- RuPaul's Drag Race All Stars (season 11)

=== Web series ===
Year	Title	Role	Notes	Ref
2022	Whatcha Packin'	Herself	Guest	
2022	Drag Us Weekly	Herself	Guest	
2022	The Awardist	Herself	Guest	
2022	Binge Queens	Herself	RuPaul's Drag Race: Down Under - Series 2	
2022	Folx Presents	Herself	Guest	

- Bring Back My Girls (2023)

== Awards and nominations ==
Year	Award-giving body	Category	Work	Results	Ref.
2022	Critics' Choice Real TV Awards	Best Ensemble Cast in an Unscripted Series (Shared with the Season 14 cast)	RuPaul's Drag Race	Won	
2023	Queerty Awards	Closet Door Bustdown (Shared with Bosco, Kornbread Jeté and Willow Pill)	RuPaul's Drag Race	Runner-up	
2023	Queerty Awards	Future All-Star	Herself	Nominated	

== See also ==
- LGBTQ culture in New York City
- List of LGBTQ people from New York City
- List of people from Binghamton, New York
