= June Jambalaya =

American drag performer

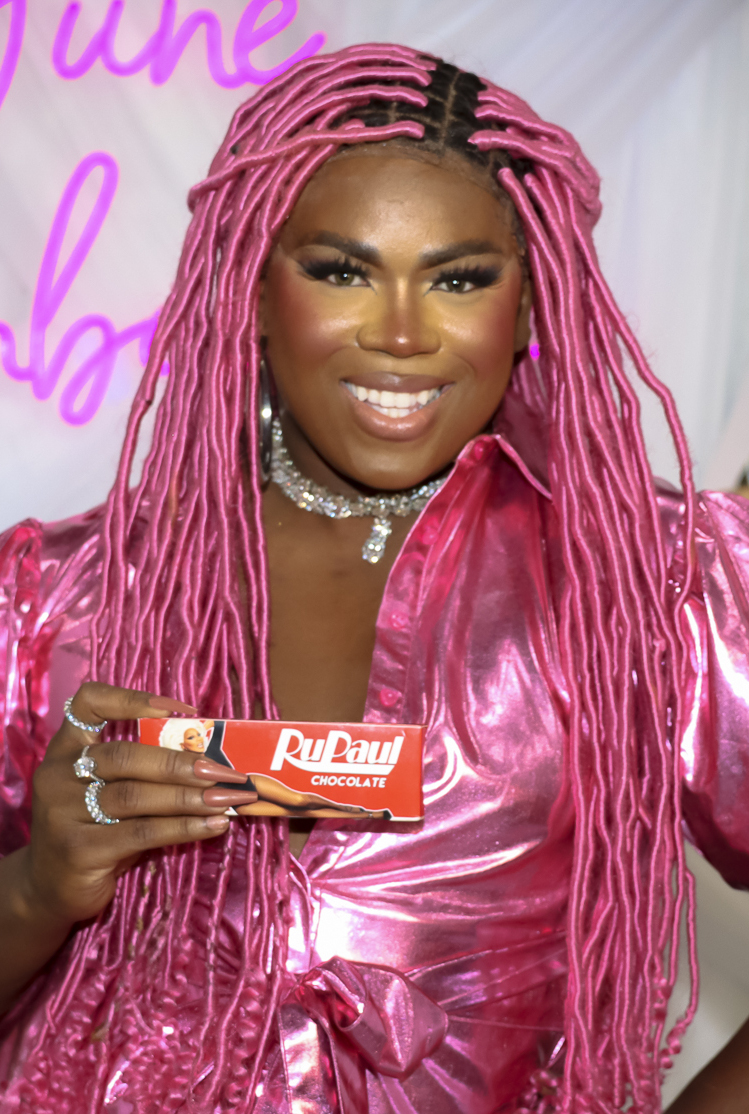
- June Jambalaya at RuPaul's DragCon LA, 2022
- Born: Jacksonville, Florida, USA
- Occupation: Drag performer
- Known for: Competitor on season 14 of RuPaul's Drag Race

June Jambalaya is an American drag performer who competed on season 14 of RuPaul's Drag Race.

== Career ==
June Jambalaya competed on season 14 of RuPaul's Drag Race. She was eliminated from the competition after placing in the bottom two of a design challenge and losing a lip sync against Maddy Morphosis to "I Love It" (2020) by Kylie Minogue.

== Personal life ==
June Jambalaya is originally from Jacksonville, Florida, and later relocated to Los Angeles.

== Filmography ==
- RuPaul's Drag Race
- Bring Back My Girls (2023)

== See also ==
- List of people from Jacksonville, Florida
