= Winner Winner, Chicken Dinner =

- RuPaul's Drag Race All Stars episode
- Episode no.: Season 10; Episode 1
- Directed by: Nick Murray
- Presented by: RuPaul
- Original air date: May 9, 2025

Guest appearances
- Ice Spice; Jamal Sims

Episode chronology
← Previous "Grande Finale Variety Extravaganza Part II"	Next → "Murder on the Dance Floor"
- RuPaul's Drag Race All Stars season 10

"Winner Winner, Chicken Dinner" is the tenth season premiere of the American reality competition television series RuPaul's Drag Race All Stars, and the 90th episode overall. It originally aired in the United States on the streaming service Paramount+ on May 9, 2025. It was followed by an episode of the companion series RuPaul's Drag Race All Stars: Untucked.

The episode featured the first bracket contestants perform in a heavy metal-themed music video. Ice Spice is as a guest judge, alongside regular panelists RuPaul, Michelle Visage, and Ross Mathews. Aja wins the main challenge, after placing in the top two and winning a lip-sync contest against Irene the Alien to "Think U the Shit (Fart)" (2024) by Ice Spice.

== Episode ==
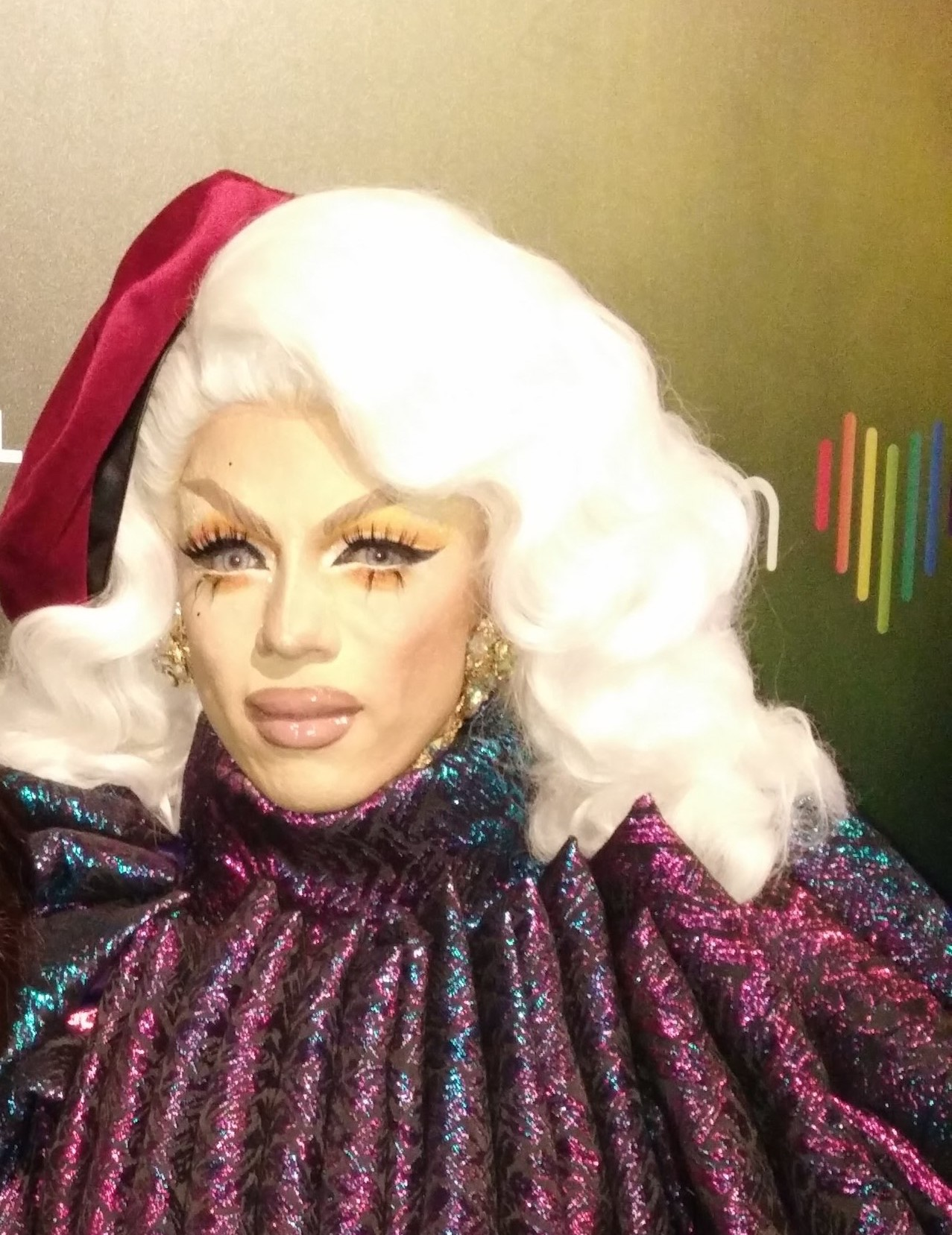
Aja (pictured in 2018) wins the episode's lip-sync contest.

The episode opens with host RuPaul and regular panelist Michelle Visage introducing the first bracket, with six contestants entering the main stage. The two explain the format where in the preliminary rounds, no one is eliminated and instead will compete for points. Every week, the top two contestants will receive two points each, whoever wins the lip-sync contest gets an extra point. After the third round, the top three contestants with the most points will continue in the semifinals. RuPaul announces the first main challenge, which tasks the contestants with performing in a heavy metal-themed music video titled "Winner Winner, Chicken Dinner" and writing their own song structure.

RuPaul enters the work room to meet with contestants individually. Irene DuBois discusses renaming herself Irene the Alien. DeJa Skye explains how she lost sixty pounds in Mexico but suffered from complications. Aja talks about quitting drag, but returning after Kylie Sonique Love won the sixth season. Phoenix is now an entertainer manager from the nightclubs she worked at. Bosco talks about her facial feminization surgery. Olivia Lux discusses her entrance to the Ballroom scene.

On the main stage, the contestants practice their dance routine with choreographer Jamal Sims. RuPaul introduces American rapper Ice Spice as the guest judge, alongside regular panelist Michelle Visage and alternating judge Ross Mathews. "Slits and Tits" is the runway category, which requires contestants to present outfits featuring breasts. Aja and Irene the Alien are announced as the top two contestants for the week and gain two points each. Both drag performers faced off in a lip-sync contest to "Think U the Shit (Fart)" by Ice Spice. Aja wins the lip-sync contest and earns an extra point and a cash prize of $10,000. The other contestants also obtain one point but they must give it away to another contestant of their choice.

The episode ends with an in memoriam segment dedicated to Filipino drag performer Jiggly Caliente, who died on April 27, 2025.

== Production and broadcast ==
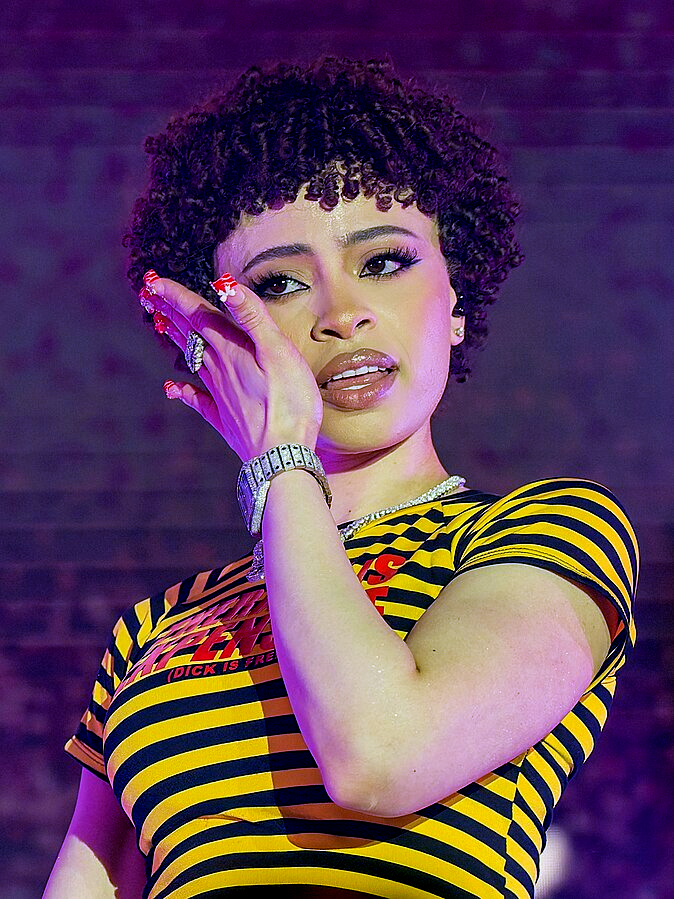
Ice Spice is a guest judge.

"Winner Winner, Chicken Dinner" was previewed in a lengthy promotional trailer for season 10 on May 3, 2025. This included various scenes of the format, runway categories, and guest judges. An online video was released through YouTube that featured the first 10 minutes of the episode. The season 10 premiere episode was directed by Nick Murray.

"Winner Winner, Chicken Dinner" was originally released through Paramount+ in the United States on May 9, 2025. It was also released with same-day availability through streaming services: Crave for Canada, Stan for Australia, and WOW Presents Plus internationally.

Phoenix later commented on feedback given to her by Ice Spice.

== Reception ==
Chris Feil of Vulture rated the episode four out of five stars. Kevin O'Keeffe ranked the "Think U the Shit (Fart)" performance sixth in Xtra Magazine's list of the top ten Drag Race lip-syncs of 2025. Bernardo Sim of Out magazine said Aja "obliterated" Irene the Alien in the contest.
