= Kerri Colby =

American drag performer

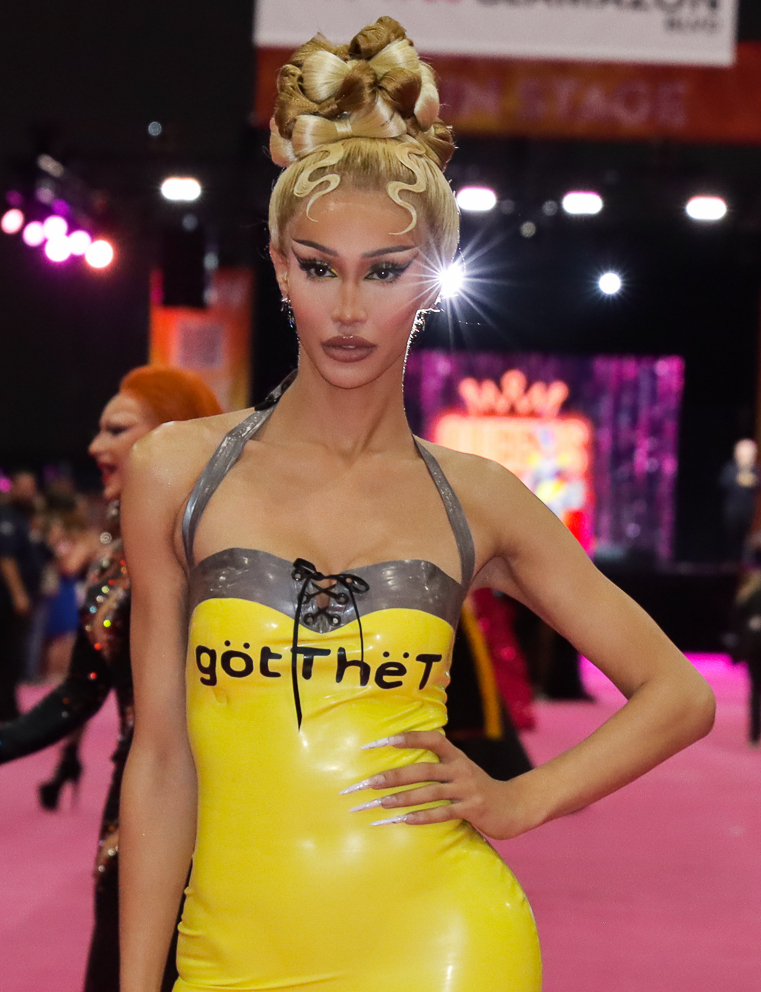
- Kerri Colby at RuPaul's DragCon LA, 2024
- Born: July 30, 1996 (age 30); Dallas, Texas, U.S.
- Other names: Elyse Alessandra Anderson; Kerri Elyse Colby
- Occupation: Drag performer
- Years active: 2016–present
- Known for: Drag Performer
- Television: RuPaul's Drag Race (season 14) and RuPaul's Drag Race All Stars (season 10)
- Height: 5 ft 11 in (180 cm)
- Website: kerricolby.com

Signature
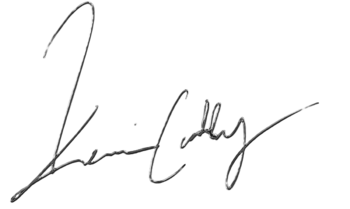

Kerri Colby is the stage name of Elyse Alessandra Anderson (born July 30, 1996), an American drag performer best known for competing on season 14 of RuPaul's Drag Race, where she placed ninth overall, and season 10 of RuPaul's Drag Race All Stars. Kerri Colby is based in Los Angeles, California.

== Early life ==
Anderson was born in Dallas, Texas to a woman named Pamela (not to be confused with Pamela Anderson). She was raised in a Pentecostal household and has stated that, although those beliefs are at odds with her identity, they instilled in her a desire to "question everything."

Colby learned about drag after watching the fifth season of RuPaul's Drag Race. She left home at 15, citing the toxic environment created by her family as her reason for leaving. She couch-surfed, mostly in Dallas's Oak Lawn neighborhood (the city's gayborhood) and made a number of friends that took care of her after leaving home. Colby has stated that many of the people who took care of her were much older, and it led to abusive relationships.

On Monét X Change's podcast, Monét Talks, Colby recounted her experience with a particularly important figure in her life. While resting at a train station after being kicked out, a stranger of El Salvadorian descent named Manuel recognized her from her social media posts and offered to help her. Colby states this person took her in until she was eighteen and was pivotal in helping her finish school and find work. In an interview with Michelle Visage, she stated "[he was] completely my angel... I would not have made it."

Colby moved to Los Angeles at 18 after being messaged by a Sugar Daddy. She lived with him in West Hollywood for approximately one year.

== Career ==
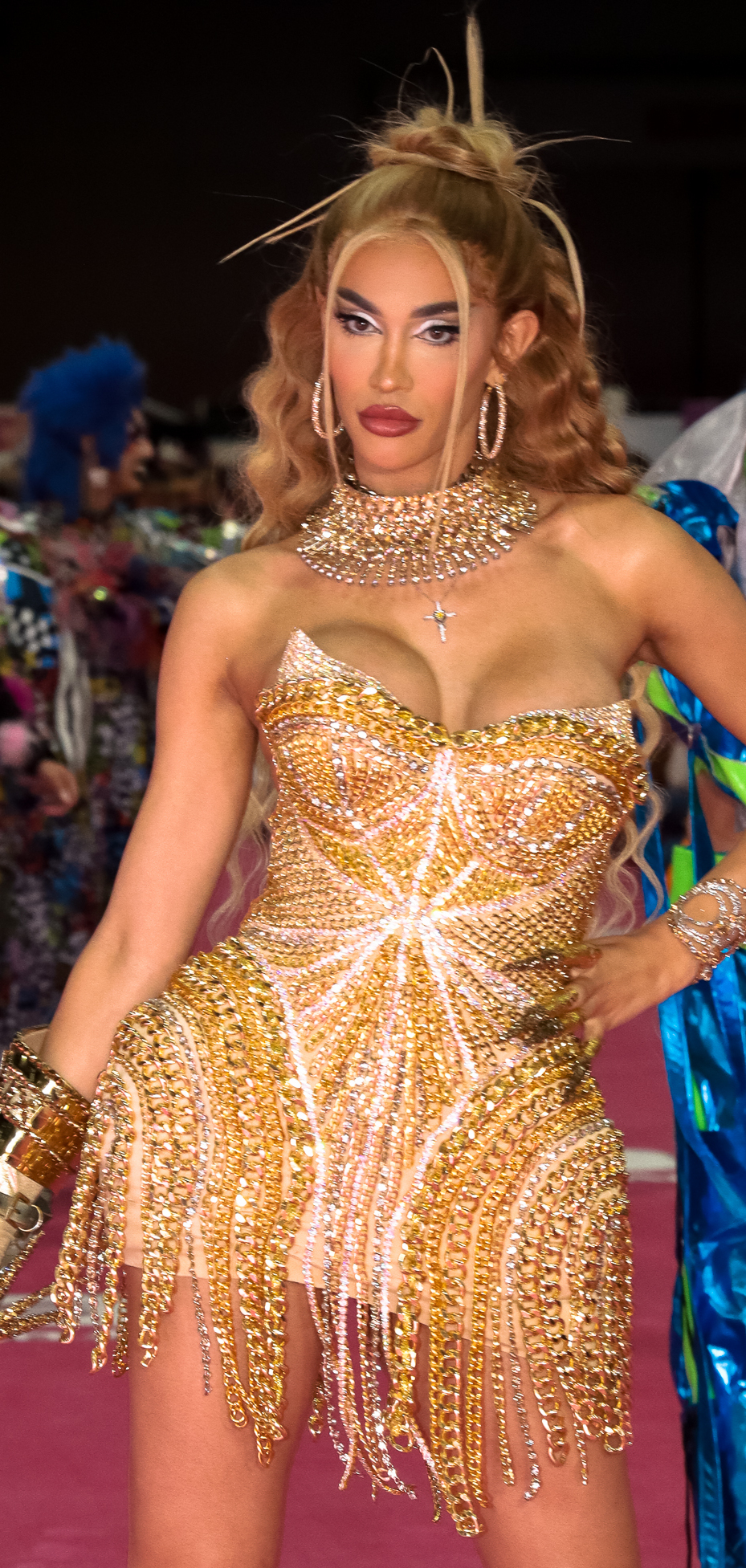
Kerri Colby at RuPaul's DragCon LA in 2023

Colby competed on season 14 of RuPaul's Drag Race. On episode 4, she ranked in the bottom and lip-synced against Alyssa Hunter to Jennifer Lopez's song, "Play". Colby won the lip sync and remained in the competition. On episode 8, however, she was once again placed in the bottom and lost her lip-sync to Jasmine Kennedie, performing to "Un-Break My Heart" by Toni Braxton.

In March 2022, she was one of several drag queens to be featured in Jennifer Lopez's performance at the iHeartRadio Music Awards. In May, her nomination for Best Viral Moment (The America's Next Top Meme Award) was announced at the 2022 WOWIE Awards, a part of RuPaul's DragCon in Los Angeles. She shared the nomination with drag queens Daya Betty and Kornbread "The Snack" Jeté. In June of that same year, Colby appeared in an advertising campaign for cannabis beverage brand Cann, alongside fellow season 14 contestants Willow Pill, Jorgeous, and Kornbread, as well as other LGBTQ+ celebrities including Hayley Kiyoko and Gus Kenworthy. During press for the Cann campaign, Colby shared that she worked at a dispensary before appearing on Drag Race.

In 2023, she appeared in a cameo during an episode of season 15's Untucked to give a video message to her drag mother (and eventual season 15 winner) Sasha Colby.

On April 23, 2025, Kerri Colby was announced as one of eighteen former Drag Race contestants participating in the tenth season of RuPaul's Drag Race All Stars. She was ultimately eliminated at the conclusion of the second bracket but returned as the judge's Wild Card pick for the finale. She was eliminated in the finale's episode's first round.

In September 2025, Colby performed at Northern Nevada Pride.

== Personal life ==
Kerri Colby is a trans woman. Fellow Drag Race contestant and trans woman Kornbread Jeté credits Kerri Colby with helping her transition. She has also helped inspire Jasmine Kennedie to come out as a trans woman in an episode of season 14's Untucked. Bosco has also cited Kerri Colby as a source of "clarity" in her transition, which she announced after season 14 wrapped filming.

== Filmography ==
Year	Title	Genre	Role	Notes
2022	RuPaul's Drag Race (season 14)	TV	Contestant	9th place (11 episodes, including Queen Ruveal special)
2022-2023	RuPaul's Drag Race: Untucked	TV	Herself	Season 13, 7 episodes
2022-2023	RuPaul's Drag Race: Untucked	TV	Herself	Cameo (Season 14, 1 episode)
2022	Whatcha Packin'	Web series	Herself	Guest (Season 15, episode 6: Kerri Colby)
2022	MTV Movie & TV Awards Red Carpet	Web show	Herself	Co-host
2023	Kerri Kares	TV	Herself	Host (8 episodes)
2023	Photo Fashion RuView	Web series	Herself	Co-host (12 episodes)
2023	Look at Huh	Web series	Herself	Guest (Season 1, episode 7)
2023	Bring Back My Girls	Web series	Herself	Guest (Season 2, episode 1: Season 14)
2024	Hey Qween	Web series	Herself (Voice only)	Cameo (Season 10, episode 2: Mirage)
2024	Slaycation	TV	Herself	Main cast
2025	RuPaul's Drag Race All Stars (season 10)	TV	Contestant	5th place (4 episodes)

== Awards and nominations ==
Year	Award	Category	Work	Result	Ref.
2022	Critics' Choice Real TV Awards	Best Ensemble Cast in an Unscripted Series (Shared with the Season 14 cast)	RuPaul's Drag Race	Won	
2023	Queerties Awards	Future All-Star	Herself	Nominated	
