= Painted with Raven =

American television series

- Genre: Reality competition
- Presented by: Raven
- Ending theme: "Color Me Love" by RuPaul
- Country of origin: United States
- Original language: English
- No. of seasons: 3
- No. of episodes: 24

Production
- Executive producers: RuPaul; Randy Barbato; Fenton Bailey; Tom Campbell
- Production company: World of Wonder

Original release
- Network: WOW Presents Plus
- Release: November 25, 2021 – January 5, 2023

Painted with Raven is a makeup competition television series hosted by Raven, which premiered on WOW Presents Plus on November 25, 2021. RuPaul serves as co-executive producer alongside Randy Barbato, Fenton Bailey, and Tom Campbell of World of Wonder. After two weeks of the debut competition show, on December 9, 2021, it was announced that it had been picked up for a second season.

== Format ==
Each week contestants compete in challenges for points. The best performing contestant of the week is awarded three points and the lowest-performing contestant receives none and is muted, thus unable to compete in the following episode's challenge. The winner of the show is determined through a final showdown and receives a cash prize of $25,000. The show is shot virtually with contestants competing from their own homes.

== Series overview ==
Season	Premiere	Finale	Winner	Runner(s)-up	No. of contestants	Winner's prizes
1	November 25, 2021	January 13, 2022	Matt	Tajh; Yvonne	7	One-year supply of Anastasia Beverly Hills cosmetics; $25,000; Title of America's First Makeup Superstar
2	November 17, 2022	January 5, 2023	Tucker	Nikki Nik; LaQuan	8	One-year supply of Anastasia Beverly Hills cosmetics; $25,000; Title of America's Next Makeup Superstar

The first season of Painted with Raven began airing on November 25, 2021 on World of Wonder's streaming service, WOW Presents Plus. The season ran for 8 episodes and concluded on January 13, 2022. Matt, Tajh, and Yvonne made the final, and Matt was the winner of the first season.

On December 9, 2021, it was announced that World of Wonder renewed the series for a second season. On November 9, 2022, the second season's trailer was revealed with its casting.

== Spin-offs ==
=== Painting with Raven ===
Painting with Raven is a spin-off of Painted with Raven, featuring eight former Drag Race contestants. The show premiered on October 8, 2024.

Episode	Date	Contestant	Age	Hometown	Drag Race season(s)
1	October 8, 2024	Angeria Paris VanMicheals	29	Atlanta, Georgia	Season 14
1	October 8, 2024	Angeria Paris VanMicheals	29	Atlanta, Georgia	All Stars 9
2	October 15, 2024	Jaida Essence Hall	36	Milwaukee, Wisconsin	Season 12
2	October 15, 2024	Jaida Essence Hall	36	Milwaukee, Wisconsin	All Stars 7
3	October 22, 2024	DeJa Skye	33	Fresno, California	Season 14
4	October 29, 2024	Silky Nutmeg Ganache	33	Chicago, Illinois	Season 11
4	October 29, 2024	Silky Nutmeg Ganache	33	Chicago, Illinois	All Stars 6
4	October 29, 2024	Silky Nutmeg Ganache	33	Chicago, Illinois	Canada vs. the World 1
5	November 5, 2024	Nicole Paige Brooks	50	Atlanta, Georgia	Season 2
6	November 12, 2024	Naomi Smalls	30	Chicago, Illinois	Season 8
6	November 12, 2024	Naomi Smalls	30	Chicago, Illinois	All Stars 4
7	November 19, 2024	Phoenix	42	Atlanta, Georgia	Season 3
8	November 26, 2024	Shannel	44	Long Beach, California	Season 1
8	November 26, 2024	Shannel	44	Long Beach, California	All Stars 1
8	November 26, 2024	Shannel	44	Long Beach, California	All Stars 9

=== Touch-Ups with Raven ===
==== Season 1 (2024) ====
Touch-Ups with Raven is a spin-off of Painted with Raven, which was taped live during DragCon LA 2024, featuring six international contestants from Drag Race. Premiered on September 11, 2024 on WOW Presents Plus.

Episode	Date	Contestant	Age	Hometown	Drag Race season(s)
1	September 11, 2024	Lawrence Chaney	27	Glasgow, Scotland	UK series 2
2	September 18, 2024	Morphine Love Dion	25	Miami, Florida	Season 16
3	September 25, 2024	La Grande Dame	24	Nice, France	France season 1
3	September 25, 2024	La Grande Dame	24	Nice, France	UK vs. the World 2
4	October 2, 2024	Sapphira Cristál	35	Philadelphia, Pennsylvania	Season 16
5	October 9, 2024	Grag Queen	29	Canela, Brazil	Brasil (Note: Grag Queen is the host of Drag Race Brasil and has not competed on a previous season of Drag Race, but was the winner of the first season of Queen of the Universe.)
6	October 16, 2024	M1ss Jade So	25	Marikina, Metro Manila	Philippines season 2

==== Season 2 (2025) ====
The season 2 of spin-off Touch-Ups with Raven, which was taped live during DragCon UK 2025, featuring six international contestants from Drag Race.

Episode	Date	Contestant	Age	Hometown	Drag Race season(s)
1	June 10, 2025	Marina Summers	27	Makati, Philippines	Philippines season 1
1	June 10, 2025	Marina Summers	27	Makati, Philippines	UK vs. the World 2
2	June 17, 2025	Danny Beard	32	Liverpool, England	UK series 4
3	June 24, 2025	Tessa Testicle	26	Basel, Switzerland	Germany Season 1
3	June 24, 2025	Tessa Testicle	26	Basel, Switzerland	Global All Stars
4	July 1, 2025	Kween Kong	32	Adelaide, Australia	Down Under Season 2
4	July 1, 2025	Kween Kong	32	Adelaide, Australia	Global All Stars
5	July 8, 2025	Pythia	31	Montreal, Canada	Canada Season 2
5	July 8, 2025	Pythia	31	Montreal, Canada	Global All Stars
6	July 15, 2025	Tayce	29	Newport, Wales	UK series 2
