= 4th Tranny Awards =

US adult entertainment industry award

- Date: February 19, 2012
- Site: Joseph's Cafe, Hollywood
- Hosted by: Nicole Paige Brooks

Highlights
- Best Film: Rogue Adventures 37
- Most awards: Eva Lin (3)
- Most nominations: Mandy Mitchell (6)

The 4th Annual Tranny Awards was a pornographic awards event recognizing the best in transgender pornography form the previous year from November 1, 2010, to 31 October 2011. December 12, 2011, online on the trannyawards.com website. The winners were announced during the awards on February 19, 2012.

The winners were decided by a mixture a panel of industry judges and fan voting.

This was the fourth awards dedicated to recognising achievements in transgender pornography. Steven Grooby the founder of the awards stated that he wanted to address the lack of representation of transgender performers in awards.

The nominations for the 4th Tranny Awards were announced online and opened to fan voting on December 12, 2011, online on the trannyawards.com website. The winners were announced during the awards on February 19, 2012.

== Awards ==
Winners are listed first, highlighted in boldface.

| Besrt Solo Model | Best New Face |
|---|---|
| **Sarina Valentina**; Amy Daly; Bailey Jay; Domino Presley; Eva Lin; Jizelle Moore; Khloe Hart; Kimber James; Mandy Mitchell; Morgan Bailey; Sammi Valentine; Sunshyne Monroe; Teighjiana; Tiffany Starr | **Eva Lin**; Jane West; Jenna Rachels; Jonelle Brooks; Kelly Clare; Monique Dior; Ryder Monroe; Sadie Hawkins; Teighjiana; Tiffany Starr; Wendy Summers |
| Best Hardcore Model | Best Non-Typical Model |
| **Eva Lin**; Aly Sinclair; Amy Daly; Domino Presley; Foxxy; Jesse; Jessica Foxx; Joanna Jet; Juliette Stray; Mandy Mitchell; Mia Isabella; Morgan Bailey; Ryder Monroe; Sarina Valentina; Tieghjiana; Tiffany Starr; Brittany St Jordan | **Mandy Mitchell**; Amy Daly; Brittany St.Jordan; Chloe; Danni Daniels; Jamie Markham; Juliette Stray; Lexi Wade; Michelle Austin; Tempest; Wendy Summers |
| Best Free Website | Best Non-TS performer |
| **caramelstgirls.com**; hungangels.com; hungdevils.com; tgirlalexis.blogspot.com; www.tgflix.com; sparkysnakeden.com/blog | **Christian**; Wolf Hudson; Rico Steele; Ava Devine; Patrick; Sebastian Keys |
| Best DVD Release | Best Photographer |
| **Rogue Adventures 37**; America's Next Top Tranny 14; La Femme Nikita - A Tranny Spy Parody; Rogue Adventures 36; Shemale Cougar; Shemale Pornstar Vol 2; Shemale Pornstar Jessica Foxx; Shemale Strokers 49; This Is Definitely NOT Ugly Betty - A XXX Tranny Parody DVD; Transsexual Babysitters 18; Transsexual Superstars : Mandy Mitchell | **Nick Milo**; Blackula Photography; Bob; Buddy Wood; Frank; Jack Flash; Jasmine Jewels; Liberty Harkness; Remy; Tony Vee |
| Best Solo Website | Hottest Scene |
| **Mandy Mitchell**; Angeles Cid; Amy Daly; Bailey Jay; Carmen Moore; Domino Presley; Joanna Jet; Kimber James; Krissy 4U; Liberty Harkness; Mia Isabella; Sammi Valentine; Sarina Valentina; Danielle Foxx; Sweet Cheeks; TS Jesse; TS Rockdolls; Hot Wendy Williams | **"TS Domination" - Eva Lin, Honey Foxxx, Sebastian Keys - TS Seduction**; "Three's Company" - Amy Daly, Danielle Foxx, Ava Devine - Amydaly.com; "Fuck Me Coach" - Amy Daly & Christian - Amydaly.com; "Tiffany Starr in "Transsexual Babysitters 18"; "Britney Markham and Teighjiana" - Shemale Pornstar; "Aly Sinclair and Courtney Tailor" - Rogue Adventures 37; "Aly Sinclair" - Shemale Police 3; "Kelly Pierce & Mason Pierce" - Shemale.XXX; "Candi McBride and Christian" - Bang My Tranny Ass; "One Night Stand - Sarina Valentina & Brian Bonds" - TS Seduction; "Switch" - Mia Isabella and Ty Roderick TS Seduction; "Mandy, Tori and Danni" - Mandy Mitchell.com; "Tiffany Starr and Sarina Valentina" - America's Next Top Tranny 14 |
| Shemale Yum Model of the Year | Shemale Strokers Model of the Year: |
| **Domino Presley** | **Delia Delions** |
| Black Tgirls Model of the Year: | Kink Award for Kinkiest Tgirl Domme |
| **Nody Nadia** | **Yasmin Lee** |
Lifetime Achievement Award
**Vaniity** (performer) **Joey Silvera** (non-performer)
