= Alyssa Hunter =

Puerto Rican drag queen

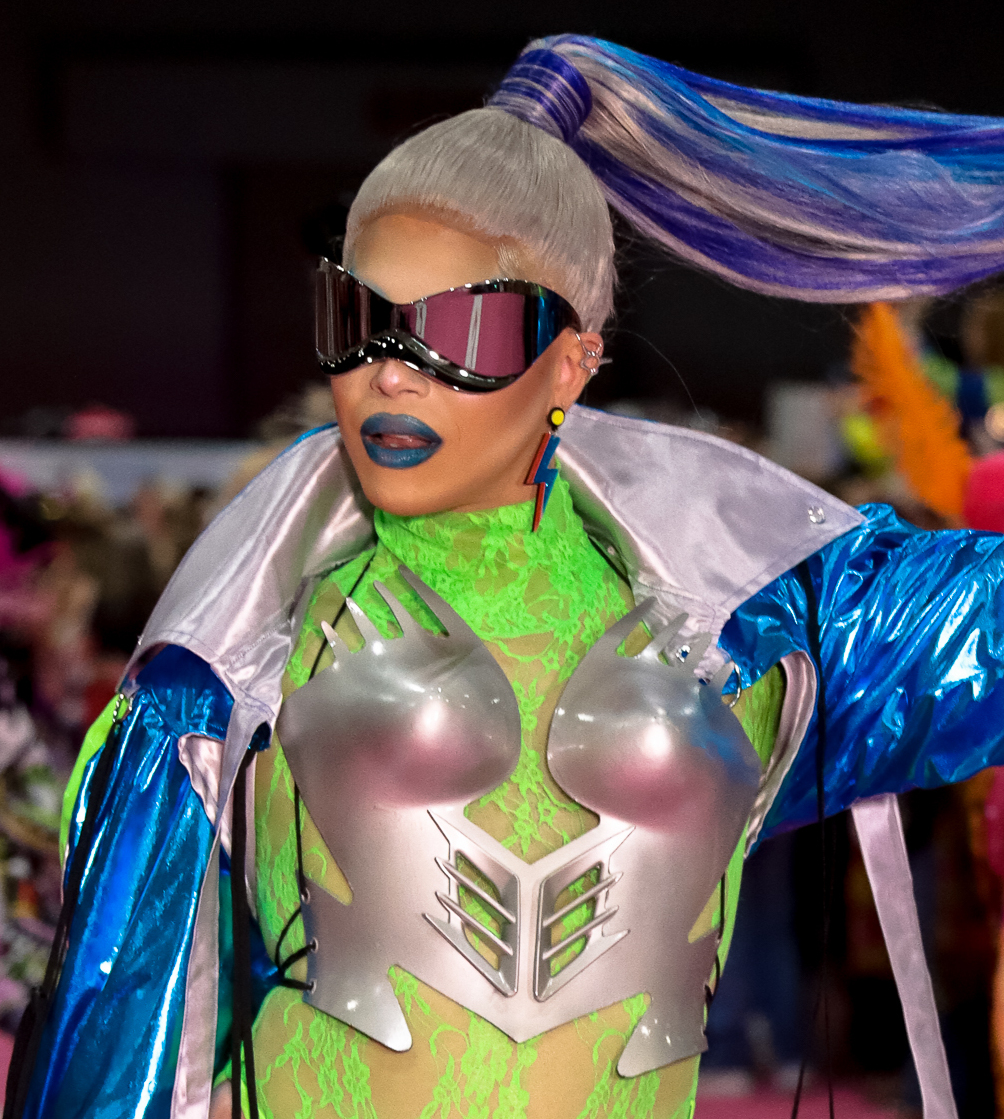
- Alyssa Hunter at RuPaul's DragCon LA, 2023
- Born: Joshua Enrique Ortolaza Resto; February 19, 1995 (age 31); Bayamón, Puerto Rico, U.S.
- Occupation: Drag queen
- Television: RuPaul's Drag Race (season 14) and RuPaul's Drag Race All Stars (season 10)
- Website: alyssahunter.castxp.com

Alyssa Hunter is the stage name of Joshua Enrique Ortolaza Resto, a Puerto Rican drag performer who competed on season 14 of RuPaul's Drag Race and season 10 of RuPaul's Drag Race All Stars.

== Career ==
Alyssa Hunter is a drag performer and has participated in pageants. Michael Cook of Instinct magazine has described her as "one of the most famed queens" from Puerto Rico. Alyssa Hunter competed on season 14 of RuPaul's Drag Race. She was eliminated from the competition after placing in the bottom two of the "Super Tease" challenge and losing a lip sync against Kerri Colby to "Play" (2001) by Jennifer Lopez. Alyssa Hunter has been called the "trade" of the season.

On April 23, 2025, Alyssa Hunter was announced as one of eighteen former Drag Race contestants participating in the tenth season of RuPaul's Drag Race All Stars.

== Personal life ==
Resto is from Cataño.

== Filmography ==
=== Film ===
Year	Title	Role	Notes	Ref.
2024	The Greatest Hits	Sebastián		

=== Television ===
Year	Title	Role	Notes	Ref.
2022	RuPaul's Drag Race	Herself (contestant)	Season 14, 13th place	
2022	RuPaul's Drag Race: Untucked	Herself	Season 14	
2023	Bring Back My Girls	Herself	Guest	
2025	RuPaul's Drag Race All Stars (season 10)	Herself (contestant)	Contestant - 11th place	
2025	Drag Race France All Stars	Herself	Guest, Ep. 8	
2026	Claro que Baila - WAPA TV	Herself (contestant)	Season 2, 3rd place	

=== Web series ===
Year	Title	Role	Ref.
2022	Whatcha Packin'	Guest	
