= Nicole Paige Brooks =

American drag performer (born 1973 or 1974)

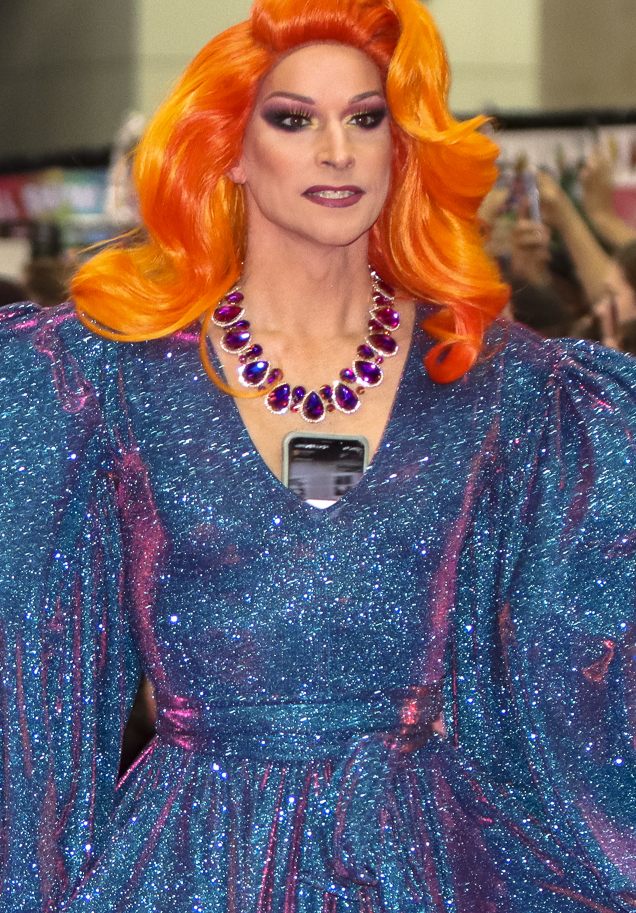
- Nicole Paige Brooks at RuPaul's DragCon LA in 2022
- Born: Brian Christopher Pryor; July 9, 1973 (age 53); Marietta, Georgia, USA
- Occupation: Drag queen
- Years active: 1995–present
- Television: RuPaul's Drag Race (season 2) RuPaul's Drag Race All Stars (season 10) Drag Race Down Under vs. the World (season 1)

Nicole Paige Brooks (born July 9, 1973) is the stage name of Brian Christopher Pryor, an American drag performer and entertainer who competed on season 2 of the television series RuPaul's Drag Race, season 10 of RuPaul's Drag Race All Stars, and Drag Race Down Under vs. the World.

Based in Georgia, Nicole Paige Brooks continues to host and perform in drag shows, and participate in Drag Race-related events.

== Career ==
Pryor is a drag performer who competed as Nicole Paige Brooks on season 2 (2010) of RuPaul's Drag Race. She was the show's first contestant to represent the U.S. state of Georgia. She was the second to be eliminated on the season, placing eleventh overall. The main challenge on the second episode required teams to perform burlesque and sell gift certificates, while competing to earn the most cash. Nicole Paige Brooks placed in the bottom two and lost a lip-sync challenge against Raven to the 1992 song "My Lovin' (You're Never Gonna Get It)" by En Vogue. The author of a chapter on villains in The Makeup of RuPaul's Drag Race: Essays on the Queen of Reality Shows (2014) wrote that Nicole Paige Brooks was "edited to seem daft and out of touch".

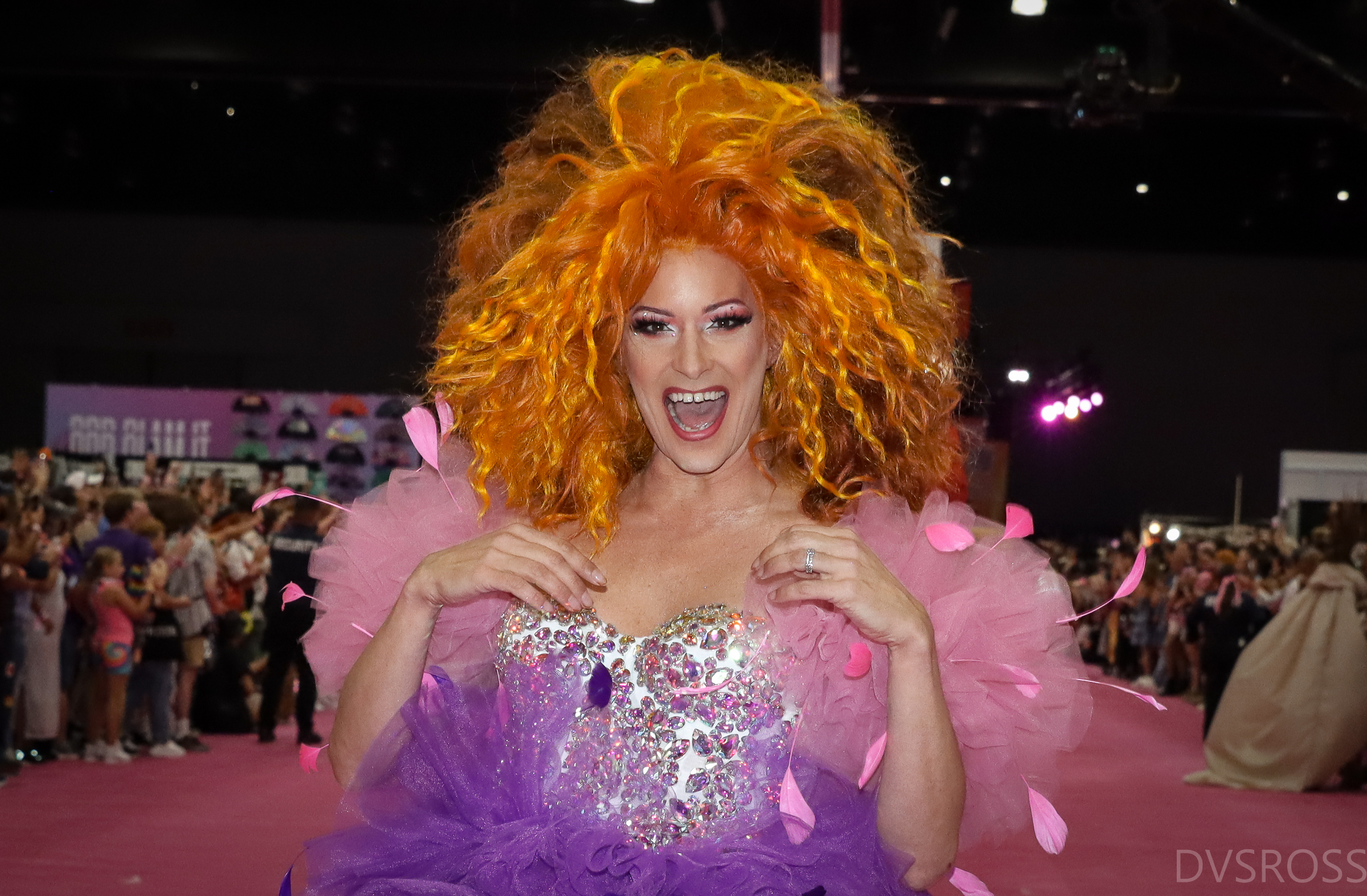
Nicole Paige Brooks at RuPaul's DragCon LA, 2024

Nicole Paige Brooks was referenced during the "reading" (or comedy roast) challenges on season 8 (2016) of Drag Race and season 3 (2018) of RuPaul's Drag Race All Stars, by contestants Kim Chi and BenDeLaCreme, respectively. In 2020, Nicole Paige Brooks participated in RuPaul's Digital DragCon, which replaced RuPaul's DragCon LA because of the COVID-19 pandemic. She was a featured guest at DragCon LA in 2022. In 2023, Marcus Wratten of PinkNews said the lip-sync between her and Raven was season 2's best, and Bernardo Sim of Pride.com wrote: "Season two was a very different time in Drag Race herstory where queens would still walk the runway with more off-the-rack, ready-to-wear looks. Still, fans and other queens love making fun of Nicole Paige Brooks's wardrobe from season two, which has turned into a long-standing joke within the fandom."

Nicole Paige Brooks continues to host and perform in drag shows. These have included The Divas Cabaret at the gay bar LeBuzz in Marietta as well as Cell Block, House of Brooks, Wild Out Wednesday (with Mo'Dest Volgare), and Legends of Drag. Nicole Paige Brooks participated in a drag show to raise funds for Puerto Rico residents impacted by the destruction of Hurricane Maria in 2017. She has performed in various events affiliated with Atlanta Pride, such as a drag brunch with season 10 winner Aquaria in 2021, the annual Starlight Cabaret, as well as an event called "Fat Slut" with season 11 contestant Silky Nutmeg Ganache in 2022. Nicole Paige Brooks also performed at a Halloween event at the Lawrenceville Arts Center in 2022. She often performs in West Hollywood, California, and has been described as well-connected to other Drag Race contestants.

In 2024, Nicole Paige Brooks was announced as one of eight former Drag Race contestants participating in Painting with Raven, a spin-off of the WOW Presents Plus series Painted with Raven. In April 2025, she was announced as one of eighteen former Drag Race contestants participating in the tenth season of RuPaul's Drag Race All Stars.

== Personal life ==
Pryor was born in Marietta, Georgia but grew up in Bitburg, Germany due to his father being in the military. Pryor has a brother named Steven and a sister named Angela. He has lived in Atlanta and Marietta. He is a parent, helping to raise his best friend's son. Pryor was arrested on drug possession charges in 2017.

Nicole Paige Brooks's "drag mother" is Shawnna Brooks, and her "drag daughter" Phoenix competed on season 3 of Drag Race. In 2025, Nicole Paige Brooks and Phoenix both competed on the tenth season of All Stars.

== Filmography ==
=== Television ===
Year	Title	Role	Notes	Ref.
2010	RuPaul's Drag Race	Contestant	Season 2, 3 episodes; 11th place	
2010	RuPaul's Drag Race: Untucked!	Herself	Season 1, 2 episodes	
2018	Insatiable	LGBTQ Center Drag Queen #1	Season 1, episode 5	
2019	Chicago P.D.	Reporter #2	Season 6, episode 17	
2025	RuPaul's Drag Race All Stars	Contestant	Season 10, 3 episodes; 11th place	
2025	RuPaul's Drag Race All Stars: Untucked!	Herself	Season 7, 3 episodes	
2026	Drag Race Down Under vs. the World	Contestant	Season 1, 2 episodes; 10th place	

=== Web series ===
- Fashion Photo RuView
- Hey Qween!
- Look at Huh
- Besties for Cash
- Painting with Raven (2024)
- Only Child with Bob the Drag Queen (2026)

== See also ==
- List of people from Atlanta
