= DeJa Skye =

American drag performer

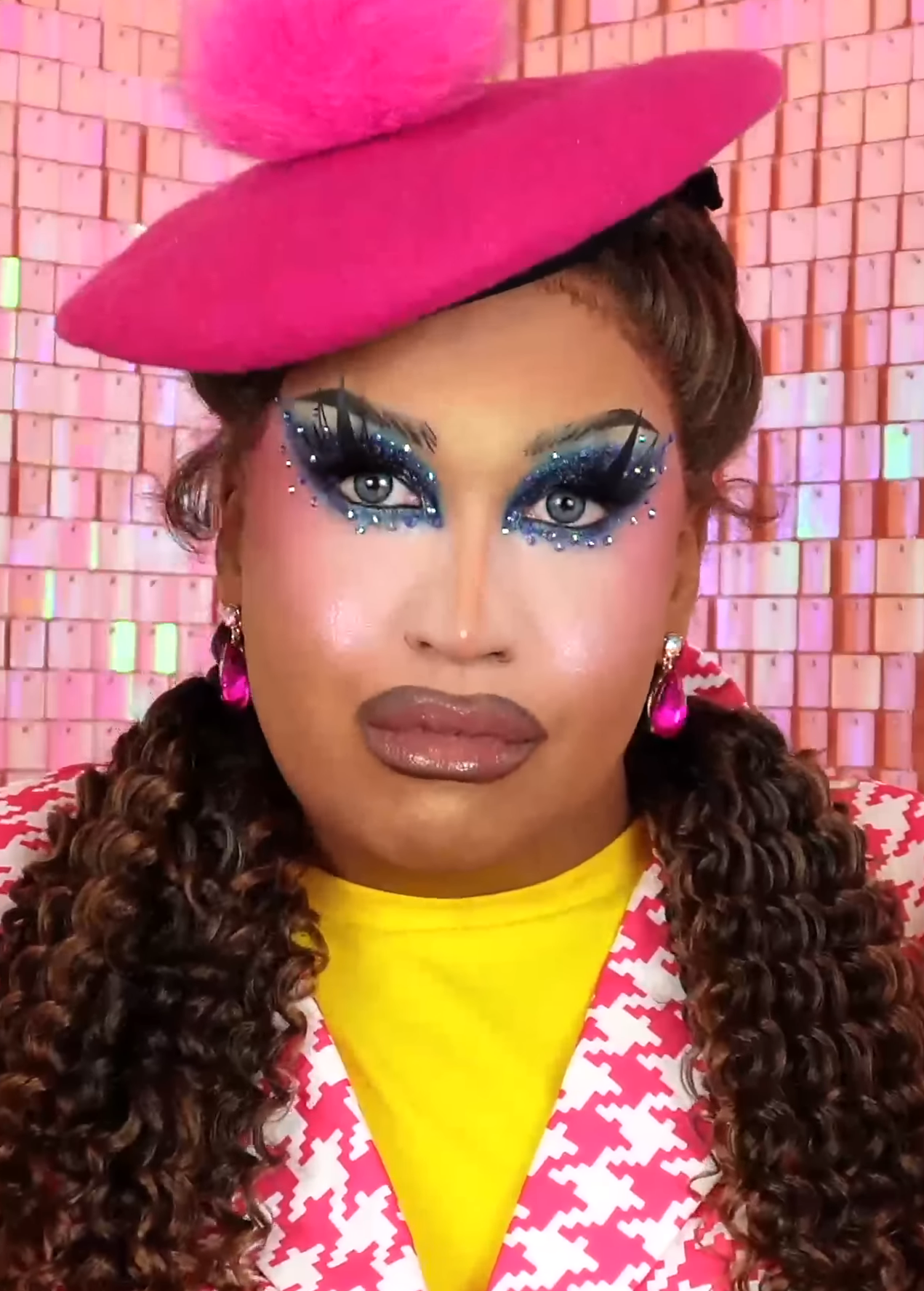
- DeJa Skye in 2024
- Born: Willie Redman; Fresno, California, U.S.
- Occupation: Drag queen
- Television: RuPaul's Drag Race (season 14) and RuPaul's Drag Race All Stars (season 10)
- Website: thedejaskye.com

DeJa Skye is the stage name of Willie Redman, an American drag performer who competed on the fourteenth season of RuPaul's Drag Race and the tenth season of RuPaul's Drag Race All Stars.

== Career ==
DeJa Skye began working as a drag queen in 2011, when she was 20 years old. Early in her career, she performed in Fresno, Modesto, and Sacramento, California.

DeJa Skye competed on the fourteenth season of RuPaul's Drag Race. She placed in the bottom two at the start of the season, but remained in the competition after eliminating Daya Betty in a lip-sync battle to Alicia Keys' 2001 song "Fallin'". She won the Snatch Game challenge in the tenth episode with her impersonation of Lil Jon, which meant she did not have to participate in a special lip-sync battle against the other seven remaining contestants in the competition at that time. After failing to impress judges in a challenge which saw contestants roast judge Ross Mathews, DeJa Skye placed in the bottom three with Jorgeous and Daya Betty, who had returned to the competition. DeJa Skye and Jorgeous were both eliminated by Daya Betty. Sam Damshenas of Gay Times said DeJa Skye's Snatch Game performance "was met with enormous praise for her impersonation of the hip-hop giant, including Jon himself".

Following her appearance on Drag Race, DeJa Skye joined the cast of the Werq the World tour. In 2024, she was announced as one of eight former Drag Race contestants participating in Painting with Raven, a spin-off of the WOW Presents Plus series Painted with Raven.

On April 23, 2025, DeJa Skye was announced as one of eighteen former Drag Race contestants participating in the tenth season of RuPaul's Drag Race All Stars.

== Personal life ==
Redman is from Fresno, California.

DeJa Skye's name comes from Beyoncé's song "Déjà Vu" (2006) and the name of a puppet on the PBS television series The Puzzle Place. She has approximately 116,000 followers on Instagram, as of February 2022.

== Filmography ==
- RuPaul's Drag Race (2022)
- Bring Back My Girls (2023)
- Painting with Raven (2024)
- RuPaul's Drag Race All Stars (2025)

== See also ==
- List of people from Fresno, California
