= RuPaul's Drag Race All Stars season 10 =

2025 season of RuPaul's Drag Race All Stars

RuPaul's Drag Race All Stars
- Season 10
- Hosted by: RuPaul
- Judges: RuPaul; Michelle Visage; Carson Kressley; Ross Mathews; Ts Madison; Law Roach
- No. of contestants: 18
- Winner: Ginger Minj
- Runner-up: Jorgeous
- Companion show: All Stars: Untucked!
- No. of episodes: 12

Release
- Original network: Paramount+
- Original release: May 9 – July 18, 2025

Season chronology
- ← Previous; Season 9 Next → Season 11

The tenth season of the American reality competition series RuPaul's Drag Race All Stars premiered May 9, 2025 on the Paramount+ streaming service. The tenth installment of the series adopts a bracket tournament format for the first time, with eighteen contestants in a Tournament of All Stars.

The season was won by Ginger Minj, marking the first time that a contestant has won any iteration of the franchise on their fourth attempt. Jorgeous, who was the first contestant to compete on back-to-back seasons of All Stars, placed as the runner-up. Kerri Colby won the random lottery to come back to the competition to compete in the LaLaPaRUza Lipsync Smackdown for the Crown, ultimately losing in the first round to eventual winner, Ginger Minj.

== Production and marketing ==
After concluding its sixteenth season from the original edition series, streaming service Paramount+ reported the spin-off series was renewed for a tenth season, including its companion series on August 16, 2024. The season was announced during the fifteenth episode from its original edition series' season seventeen, revealing their premiere date.

== Contestants ==
RuPaul's Drag Race All Stars season 10 contestants and their backgrounds (Note: All ages, names, and cities are stated at time of filming.)
| Bracket | Contestant | Age | Hometown | Original season(s) | Original placement(s) | Outcome |
|---|---|---|---|---|---|---|
| 3 | Ginger Minj | 39 | Orlando, Florida | Season 7 | Runner-up | Winner |
| 3 | Ginger Minj | 39 | Orlando, Florida | All Stars 2 | 8th place | Winner |
| 3 | Ginger Minj | 39 | Orlando, Florida | All Stars 6 | Runner-up | Winner |
| 2 | Jorgeous | 24 | Los Angeles, California | Season 14 | 6th place | Runner-up |
| 2 | Jorgeous | 24 | Los Angeles, California | All Stars 9 | 4th place | Runner-up |
| 1 | Bosco | 31 | Seattle, Washington | Season 14 | 3rd place | 3rd place |
| 2 | Lydia B Kollins (Note: Lydia Butthole Kollins is referred to as Lydia B Kollins on the show.) | 23 | Pittsburgh, Pennsylvania | Season 17 | 7th place | 3rd place |
| 1 | Aja (Note: Aja Miyake-Mugler, formerly known as Aja LaBeija, is referred to as Aja on the show.) | 30 | New York City, New York | Season 9 | 9th place | 5th place (Note: Kerri Colby originally placed tenth before re-entering the competition.) |
| 1 | Aja | 30 | New York City, New York | All Stars 3 | 7th place | 5th place |
| 3 | Daya Betty | 28 | Chicago, Illinois | Season 14 | 3rd place | 5th place |
| 1 | Irene the Alien (Note: Irene The Alien was referred to as Irene Dubois on season 15.) | 30 | Seattle, Washington | Season 15 | 16th place | 5th place |
| 2 | Kerri Colby | 27 | Los Angeles, California | Season 14 | 9th place | 5th place |
| 2 | Mistress Isabelle Brooks | 25 | Houston, Texas | Season 15 | 3rd place | 9th place |
| 3 | Cynthia Lee Fontaine | 43 | Austin, Texas | Season 8 | 10th place (Note: Cynthia Lee Fontaine was voted Miss Congeniality on her original season.) | 10th place |
| 3 | Cynthia Lee Fontaine | 43 | Austin, Texas | Season 9 | 10th place | 10th place |
| 3 | Acid Betty | 46 | New York City, New York | Season 8 | 8th place | 11th place |
| 3 | Alyssa Hunter | 31 | Los Angeles, California | Season 14 | 13th place | 11th place |
| 1 | DeJa Skye | 34 | Las Vegas, Nevada | Season 14 | 6th place | 11th place |
| 3 | Denali | 32 | Chicago, Illinois | Season 13 | 8th place | 11th place |
| 2 | Nicole Paige Brooks | 50 | Atlanta, Georgia | Season 2 | 11th place | 11th place |
| 1 | Olivia Lux | 31 | New York City, New York | Season 13 | 5th place | 11th place |
| 1 | Phoenix | 43 | Atlanta, Georgia | Season 3 | 12th place | 11th place |
| 2 | Tina Burner | 43 | New York City, New York | Season 13 | 7th place | 11th place |

== Contestant progress ==
Legend:

Ginger Minj won RuPaul's Drag Race All Stars season 10.
Jorgeous was the runner-up.
Kerri Colby was chosen as the Comeback Queen (CBQ) from the Wildcard Lottery.
WIN indicates that the contestant won both the challenge and the Lip Sync for Your Legacy, receiving three points.
TOP2 indicates that the contestant won the challenge, but lost the Lip Sync for Your Legacy, receiving two points.
The contestant collected enough points to advance to the semifinals.
ADV indicates that the contestant won one of the Lip Sync Smackdown for the Crown lip syncs and advanced to the next one.
SAFE indicates that the contestant was declared safe by the judges.
MVQ (Most Valuable Queen) indicates that the contestant was in the bottom and participated in the “Most Valuable Queen” points distribution.
BTM (Bottom) indicates that the contestant was up for elimination.
LOSS indicates that the contestant was eligible for the Wildcard Lottery, but was not selected to return.
The contestant was eliminated.
The contestant was seeded in Bracket 1.
The contestant was seeded in Bracket 2.
The contestant was seeded in Bracket 3.

Contestants progress with placements in each episode
| Contestant | Episode | | | | | | | | | Points (Note: The points count and the following outcome for the queens was decided on each bracket's final episode.) | Episode | | | | | |
|---|---|---|---|---|---|---|---|---|---|---|---|---|---|---|---|---|
| Contestant | Bracket 1 | | | Bracket 2 | | | Bracket 3 | | | Points | Semifinals | | Finale | | | |
| Contestant | 1 | 2 | 3 | 4 | 5 (Note: On episode 5, both Top All Stars won the lip sync and were awarded 2.5 points each.) | 6 | 7 | 8 | 9 | Points | 10 | 11 | 12 (Note: The eliminated queens have a chance to re-enter the competition through the Wildcard Lottery. Three judges each choose one eliminated queen whom they think deserves another shot at winning the competition. Ross Mathews chooses Mistress Isabelle Brooks, but both Ts Madison and Michelle Visage choose Kerri Colby, granting her re-entry.) | | | |
| Ginger Minj | | | | | | | WIN | WIN | TOP2 | 8 | WIN | SAFE | | ADV | ADV | Winner |
| Jorgeous | | | | MVQ | WIN | WIN | | | | 7.5 | SAFE | SAFE | | ADV | ADV | Runner-up |
| Bosco | MVQ | WIN | TOP2 | | | | | | | 6 | SAFE | WIN | | ADV | ELIM | |
| Lydia B Kollins | | | | WIN | MVQ | TOP2 | | | | 7 | SAFE | BTM | | ADV | ELIM | |
| Aja | WIN | MVQ | MVQ | | | | | | | 5 | SAFE | SAFE | | ELIM | | |
| Daya Betty | | | | | | | TOP2 | MVQ | WIN | 6 | SAFE | SAFE | | ELIM | | |
| Irene the Alien | TOP2 | TOP2 | WIN | | | | | | | 7 | SAFE | SAFE | | ELIM | | |
| Kerri Colby | | | | MVQ | MVQ | MVQ | | | | 4 | | | CBQ | ELIM | | |
| Mistress Isabelle Brooks | | | | MVQ | WIN | MVQ | | | | 4.5 | BTM | ELIM | LOSS | | | |
| Cynthia Lee Fontaine | | | | | | | MVQ | MVQ | MVQ | 5 | ELIM | | LOSS | | | |
| Acid Betty | | | | | | | MVQ | MVQ | MVQ | 2 | | | LOSS | | | |
| Alyssa Hunter | | | | | | | MVQ | MVQ | MVQ | 2 | | | LOSS | | | |
| Denali | | | | | | | MVQ | TOP2 | MVQ | 4 | | | LOSS | | | |
| Nicole Paige Brooks | | | | MVQ | MVQ | MVQ | | | | 1 | | | LOSS | | | |
| Tina Burner | | | | TOP2 | MVQ | MVQ | | | | 3 | | | LOSS | | | |
| DeJa Skye | MVQ | MVQ | MVQ | | | | | | | 4 | | | LOSS | | | |
| Olivia Lux | MVQ | MVQ | MVQ | | | | | | | 4 | | | LOSS | | | |
| Phoenix | MVQ | MVQ | MVQ | | | | | | | 1 | | | LOSS | | | |

== Lip syncs ==
Legend:

The contestant won the Lip Sync for Your Legacy.
The contestant was eliminated after their fourth time in the bottom.
The contestant lost the first round of the Lip Sync Smackdown for the Crown and did not advance to the next round.
The contestant lost the second round of the Lip Sync Smackdown for the Crown and did not advance to the final round.
The contestant won the final round of the Lip Sync Smackdown for the Crown and was declared the winner of the season.

| Episode | Top All Stars | | | Song | Winner(s) |
|---|---|---|---|---|---|
| 1 | Aja | vs. | Irene the Alien | "Think U the Shit (Fart)" (Ice Spice) | Aja |
| 2 | Bosco | vs. | Irene the Alien | "Murder on the Dancefloor" (Sophie Ellis-Bextor) | Bosco |
| 3 | Bosco | vs. | Irene the Alien | "Pocketbook" (Jennifer Hudson ft. Ludacris) | Irene the Alien |
| 4 | Lydia B Kollins | vs. | Tina Burner | "Love Sensation" (Loleatta Holloway) | Lydia B Kollins |
| 5 | Jorgeous | vs. | Mistress Isabelle Brooks | "Hot to Go!" (Chappell Roan) | Jorgeous |
| 5 | Jorgeous | vs. | Mistress Isabelle Brooks | "Hot to Go!" (Chappell Roan) | Mistress Isabelle Brooks |
| 6 | Jorgeous | vs. | Lydia B Kollins | "Texas Hold 'Em" (Beyoncé) | Jorgeous |
| 7 | Daya Betty | vs. | Ginger Minj | "Defying Gravity" (Idina Menzel, Kristin Chenoweth) | Ginger Minj |
| 8 | Denali | vs. | Ginger Minj | "See You Again" (Miley Cyrus) | Ginger Minj |
| 9 | Daya Betty | vs. | Ginger Minj | "Mama Used to Say" (Junior) | Daya Betty |
| Episode | Bottom All Stars | | | Song | Eliminated |
| 10 | Cynthia Lee Fontaine | vs. | Mistress Isabelle Brooks | "Who's Zoomin' Who" (Acappella Mix) (Aretha Franklin) | Cynthia Lee Fontaine |
| 11 | Lydia B Kollins | vs. | Mistress Isabelle Brooks | "Guess" (Charli XCX, Billie Eilish) | Mistress Isabelle Brooks |
| Episode | Contestants | | | Song | Eliminated |
| 12 | Ginger Minj | vs. | Kerri Colby | "Disease" (Lady Gaga) | Kerri Colby |
| 12 | Irene the Alien | vs. | Lydia B Kollins | "Joyride" (Kesha) | Irene the Alien |
| 12 | Aja | vs. | Jorgeous | "Party Lights" (Natalie Cole) | Aja |
| 12 | Bosco | vs. | Daya Betty | "Show Me How You Burlesque" (Christina Aguilera) | Daya Betty |
| 12 | Bosco | vs. | Ginger Minj | "Raise Your Glass" (Pink) | Bosco |
| 12 | Jorgeous | vs. | Lydia B Kollins | "Whenever, Wherever" (Shakira) | Lydia B Kollins |
| 12 | Top Two All Stars | | | Song | Winner |
| 12 | Ginger Minj | vs. | Jorgeous | "It's Raining Men" (The Weather Girls) | Ginger Minj |

== Points ==
Legend:

The Top All Star won the Lip Sync for Your Legacy.
The Top All Star lost the Lip Sync for Your Legacy.
The contestant was in the bottom.
The contestant was eliminated.

Summary of weekly points and results
| Contestant | Episode | | | | | | | | |
| Contestant | 1 | 2 | 3 | 4 | 5 | 6 | 7 | 8 | 9 |
|---|---|---|---|---|---|---|---|---|---|
| Aja | 3 | 3 | 5 | | | | | | |
| Bosco | 1 | 4 | 6 | | | | | | |
| DeJa | 1 | 3 | 4 | | | | | | |
| Irene | 2 | 4 | 7 | | | | | | |
| Olivia | 1 | 3 | 4 | | | | | | |
| Phoenix | 1 | 1 | 1 | | | | | | |
| Jorgeous | | | | 2 | 4.5 | 7.5 | | | |
| Lydia | | | | 3 | 4 | 7 | | | |
| Kerri | | | | 0 | 2 | 4 | | | |
| Mistress | | | | 2 | 4.5 | 4.5 | | | |
| Nicole | | | | 0 | 1 | 1 | | | |
| Tina | | | | 2 | 2 | 3 | | | |
| Acid | | | | | | | 1 | 1 | 2 |
| Alyssa | | | | | | | 1 | 1 | 2 |
| Cynthia | | | | | | | 1 | 4 | 5 |
| Daya | | | | | | | 2 | 3 | 6 |
| Denali | | | | | | | 1 | 3 | 4 |
| Ginger | | | | | | | 3 | 6 | 8 |

=== Points per bracket ===
The Top All Star won the Lip Sync for Your Legacy.
The Top All Star lost the Lip Sync for Your Legacy.
The contestant was in the bottom.
ADV indicates that the contestant advanced to the semifinals.
ELIM indicates that the contestant was eliminated.

Weekly points and results in detail
Bracket 1
| Contestant | Episode (Note: Including the MVQ ceremony associated with the episode even if shown at the start of the following episode.) | | | Final points | Result |
| Contestant | 1 | 2 | 3 | Final points | Result |
| Aja | +3 (WIN) | — | +2 (Olivia, Phoenix) | 5 | ADV |
| Bosco | +1 (Phoenix) | +3 (WIN) | +2 (TOP2) | 6 | ADV |
| DeJa | +1 (Olivia) | +2 (Olivia, Phoenix) | +1 (Aja) | 4 | ELIM |
| Irene | +2 (TOP2) | +2 (TOP2) | +3 (WIN) | 7 | ADV |
| Olivia | +1 (DeJa) | +2 (Aja, DeJa) | +1 (DeJa) | 4 | ELIM |
| Phoenix | +1 (Bosco) | — | — | 1 | ELIM |
Bracket 2
| Contestant | Episode | | | Final points | Result |
| Contestant | 4 | 5 | 6 | Final points | Result |
| Jorgeous | +2 (Kerri, Mistress) | +2.5 (WIN) | +3 (WIN) | 7.5 | ADV |
| Kerri | — | +2 (Lydia, Nicole) | +2 (Nicole, Tina) | 4 | ELIM |
| Lydia | +3 (WIN) | +1 (Kerri) | +3 (TOP2, Mistress) | 7 | ADV |
| Mistress | +2 (Jorgeous, Nicole) | +2.5 (WIN) | — | 4.5 | ADV |
| Nicole | — | +1 (Tina) | — | 1 | ELIM |
| Tina | +2 (TOP2) | — | +1 (Kerri) | 3 | ELIM |
Bracket 3
| Contestant | Episode | | | Final points | Result |
| Contestant | 7 | 8 | 9 | Final points | Result |
| Acid | +1 (Denali) | — | +1 (Denali) | 2 | ELIM |
| Alyssa | +1 (Cynthia) | — | +1 (Cynthia) | 2 | ELIM |
| Cynthia | +1 (Alyssa) | +3 (Acid, Alyssa, Daya) | +1 (Acid) | 5 | ADV |
| Daya | +2 (TOP2) | +1 (Cynthia) | +3 (WIN) | 6 | ADV |
| Denali | +1 (Acid) | +2 (TOP2) | +1 (Alyssa) | 4 | ELIM |
| Ginger | +3 (WIN) | +3 (WIN) | +2 (TOP2) | 8 | ADV |

== Guest judges ==
On May 1, the celebrity guest judges for this season were revealed:

- Ice Spice, American rapper
- Colman Domingo, American actor, playwright and director
- Kate Beckinsale, English actress
- Susanne Bartsch, Swiss event producer
- Chappell Roan, American singer-songwriter
- Adam Shankman, American film director, producer, writer, dancer, and choreographer
- Ariana Grande, American singer-songwriter and actress
- Cynthia Erivo, British actress and singer
- Jamal Sims, American choreographer, executive producer, and director
- Mayan Lopez, American actress
- Sarah Michelle Gellar, American actress
- Devery Jacobs, Mohawk actress

=== Special guests ===
Guests who appeared in episodes, but did not judge on the main stage.

Episode 1

- Jamal Sims, choreographer

Episode 3

- Abby Prohaska, San Diego State Aztecs women's basketball
- Hunter Hernandez, UC Irvine Anteaters women's basketball
- Lauren Betts, UCLA Bruins women's basketball
- Maya Hernandez, Loyola Marymount Lions women's basketball
- Nevaeh Dean, UC Irvine Anteaters women's basketball
- Talia von Oelhoffen, USC Trojans women's basketball

Episode 6

- Leland, songwriter and producer
- Gabe Lopez, songwriter and producer

Episode 8

- Orville Peck, singer and songwriter
- David Steinberg, composer

Episode 9

- Zane Phillips, actor and model

Episode 10

- Raven, runner-up on both RuPaul's Drag Race Season 2 and All Stars 1
- Raja, winner of RuPaul's Drag Race Season 3 and contestant on All Stars 7

Episodes 11 & 12

- Angeria Paris VanMicheals, winner of All Stars 9 and contestant on RuPaul's Drag Race Season 14

== Episodes ==
| No. overall | No. in season | Title | Original release date |
|---|---|---|---|
| 90 | 1 | "Winner Winner, Chicken Dinner" | May 9, 2025 |
The Tournament of All Stars format is introduced, in which six queens each will be competing in a bracket consisting of three episodes. At the end of the three episodes of each bracket, the top three queens of each bracket will advance to the semi-finals, consisting of two competitive episodes with the top three queens of each bracket. The finale will be a Lip-Sync Lalaparuza Smackdown for the Crown. Six previous contestants from the Drag Race franchise enter and RuPaul reveals the format of the season: RuPaul will choose the Top 2 All Stars of each episode, each winning two points, who will then compete in a Lip-Sync for Your Legacy for a $10,000 tip and an extra point. Four additional points will be awarded, one each to the queens who do not lip-sync, who must give their points to the queen they vote the "Most Valuable Queen" of the week. At the end of the three episodes of each bracket, the three queens with the most points advance to the next phase of the competition. For this week's main challenge, the queens write and perform original verses and learn choreography with Jamal Sims to the song "Winner Winner, Chicken Dinner". On the runway, the category is "Tits and Slits". After critiques, the judges highlight Aja, Bosco, and Irene the Alien, naming Aja and Irene the Alien the Top 2 queens of the week. They lip-sync to "Think U the Shit (Fart)" by Ice Spice. Aja wins the lip-sync and receives the prize.: Guest Judge: Ice Spice; Alternative Judge: Ross Mathews; Main Challenge: Write and perform original verses in "Winner Winner, Chicken Dinner"; Runway Theme: Tits and Slits; Challenge Winners: Aja and Irene the Alien; Points Awarded: 2 to Aja and 2 to Irene the Alien; Lip-Sync Song: "Think U the Shit (Fart)" by Ice Spice; Lip-Sync for Your Legacy Winner: Aja; Aja receives $10,000 and an extra point.
| 91 | 2 | "Murder on the Dance Floor" | May 9, 2025 |
The four bottom queens enter the Werk Room and discuss how they will award their points: Bosco gives her point to Phoenix.; Phoenix gives her point to Bosco.; DeJa Skye gives her point to Olivia Lux.; Olivia Lux gives her point to DeJa Skye.; For this week's main challenge, the queens perform in the improv murder mystery "Murder on the Dance Floor": Aja: Ashley Brashley/Mary Kate; Bosco: Kitty Laveau; DeJa Skye: Chardonnay Harrington; Irene the Alien: Cherry Cheeks; Olivia Lux: Madame Bouffant; Phoenix: Delphine Burgundy; On the runway, the category is "Coming and Going". After critiques, the judges highlight Bosco, DeJa Skye, and Irene the Alien, naming Bosco and Irene the Alien the Top 2 queens of the week. They lip-sync to "Murder on the Dancefloor" by Sophie Ellis-Bextor. Bosco wins the lip-sync and receives the prize.: Guest Judge: Colman Domingo; Alternative Judge: Carson Kressley; Mini-Challenge: Rolling balls up the bodies of Pit Crew members without using hands; Mini-Challenge Winner: Irene the Alien; Main Challenge: Improvise in "Murder On the Dance Floor"; Runway Theme: Coming and Going; Challenge Winners: Bosco and Irene the Alien; Points Awarded: 2 to Bosco and 2 to Irene the Alien; Lip-Sync Song: "Murder on the Dancefloor" by Sophie Ellis-Bextor; Lip-Sync for Your Legacy Winner: Bosco; Bosco receives $10,000 and an extra point.
| 92 | 3 | "Hoop Queens Makeovers" | May 16, 2025 |
The four bottom queens enter the Werk Room and discuss how they will give the points to each other: Aja gives her point to Olivia Lux.; Phoenix gives her point to DeJa Skye.; Olivia Lux gives her point to DeJa Skye.; DeJa Skye gives her point to Olivia Lux.; For this week's main challenge, the queens give drag makeovers to and record and perform verses with collegiate women's basketball players. On the runway, the category is "Drag Family Resemblance". After critiques, the judges discuss all of the pairs, ultimately naming Bosco and Irene The Alien as the top 2 queens of the week. They lip-sync to "Pocketbook" by Jennifer Hudson featuring Ludacris. Irene The Alien wins the lip-sync and receives the prize. After the lip-sync, the bottom queens award their final MVQ points on the main stage.: Aja gives her point to DeJa Skye.; DeJa Skye gives her point to Olivia Lux.; Olivia Lux gives her point to Aja.; Phoenix gives her point to Aja.; With the most points, Aja, Bosco, and Irene The Alien advance from the first bracket to the semi-finals. DeJa Skye, Olivia Lux, and Phoenix are eliminated. RuPaul also reveals that one eliminated queen will re-enter the competition at the finale.: Guest Judge: Kate Beckinsale; Alternative Judge: Ts Madison; Mini-Challenge: Shooting free throws; Mini-Challenge Winner: Irene The Alien; Main Challenge: Give a drag makeover to a collegiate woman's basketball player and write, record, and perform a verse on "Shoot Your Shot"; Runway Theme: Drag Family Resemblance; Challenge Winners: Bosco and Irene The Alien; Points Awarded: 2 to Bosco and 2 to Irene The Alien; Lip-Sync Song: "Pocketbook" by Jennifer Hudson feat. Ludacris; Lip-Sync for Your Legacy Winner: Irene The Alien; Irene The Alien receives $10,000 and an extra point.; Advancing to Semi-Finals: Aja, Bosco, and Irene The Alien; Eliminated: DeJa Skye, Olivia Lux, and Phoenix
| 93 | 4 | "Eight Ball" | May 23, 2025 |
A new bracket of queens enters the main stage. For this week's main challenge, the queens need to design an outfit with all the items inside their 8-ball. On the runway, the category is Eight Ball Eleganza. After critiques, the judges highlight Lydia B Kollins, Mistress Isabelle Brooks and Tina Burner, naming Lydia B Kollins and Tina Burner the Top 2 queens of the week. They lip-sync to Love Sensation by Loleatta Holloway. Lydia B Kollins wins the lip-sync and receives the prize.: Guest Judge: Susanne Bartsch; Alternative Judge: Ts Madison; Main Challenge: Design an outfit using 8 items found on the queens' 8-ball.; Runway Theme: Eight Ball Eleganza; Challenge Winners: Lydia B Kollins and Tina Burner; Points Awarded: 2 to Lydia B Kollins and 2 to Tina Burner; Lip-Sync Song: "Love Sensation" by Loleatta Holloway; Lip-Sync for Your Legacy Winner: Lydia B Kollins; Lydia B Kollins receives $10,000 and an extra point.
| 94 | 5 | "Rappin' Roast" | May 30, 2025 |
The four bottom queens enter the Werk Room and discuss how they will give the points to each other: Nicole Paige Brooks gives her point to Mistress Isabelle Brooks.; Kerri Colby gives her point to Jorgeous.; Mistress Isabelle Brooks gives her point to Jorgeous.; Jorgeous gives her point to Mistress Isabelle Brooks.; For this week's main challenge, the queens perform in the first ever Rappin' Roast, where they write and perform verses roasting each other and perform in front of an audience. On the runway, the category is "Little Shop of Whores". After critiques, the judges highlight Jorgeous, Mistress Isabelle Brooks and Nicole Paige Brooks, naming Jorgeous and Mistress Isabelle Brooks the Top 2 queens of the week. They lip-sync to "Hot to Go!" by Chappell Roan. Jorgeous and Mistress Isabelle Brooks win the lip-sync and each win $5,000 and half point.: Guest Judge: Chappell Roan; Alternative Judge: Ross Matthews; Main Challenge: Write and perform verses roasting each other and perform in front of an audience.; Runway Theme: Little Shop of Whores; Challenge Winners: Jorgeous and Mistress Isabelle Brooks; Points Awarded: 2 to Jorgeous and 2 to Mistress Isabelle Brooks; Lip-Sync Song: "Hot to Go!" by Chappell Roan; Lip-Sync for Your Legacy Winner: Jorgeous and Mistress Isabelle Brooks; Jorgeous and Mistress Isabelle Brooks each receive $5,000 and an extra half point.
| 95 | 6 | "Starrbooty: The Rebooty" | June 6, 2025 |
The four bottom queens enter the Werk Room and discuss how they will give the points to each other: Nicole Paige Brooks gives her point to Kerri Colby.; Kerri Colby gives her point to Lydia B Kollins.; Tina Burner gives her point to Nicole Paige Brooks.; Lydia B Kollins gives her point to Kerri Colby.; For this week's main challenge, the queens perform in the "Starrbooty: The Rebooty" rusical, a follow-up to RuPaul's 1987 "dragxploitation" film series RuPaul Is: Starbooty! and the 2007 sequel Starrbooty: Jorgeous: Pam; Kerri Colby: Mimi; Lydia B Kollins: Moxy; Mistress Isabelle Brooks: Foxy; Nicole Paige Brooks: Coffee; Tina Burner: Tea; On the runway, the category is "Wild Wild West". After critiques, the judges discuss all of the queens, ultimately naming Jorgeous and Lydia B Kollins as the top 2 queens of the week. They lip-sync to " Texas Hold'Em" by Beyoncé. Jorgeous wins the lip-sync and receives the prize. After the lip-sync, the bottom queens award their final MVQ points on the main stage.: Nicole Paige Brooks gives her point to Kerri Colby.; Tina Burner gives her point to Kerri Colby.; Kerri Colby gives her point to Tina Burner.; Mistress Isabelle Brooks gives her point to Lydia B Kollins.; With the most points, Jorgeous, Lydia B Kollins and Mistress Isabelle Brooks advance from the first bracket to the semi-finals. Kerri Colby, Nicole Paige Brooks and Tina Burner are eliminated. RuPaul also reveals that one eliminated queen will re-enter the competition at the finale.: Guest Judge: Adam Shankman; Alternative Judge: Carson Kressley; Main Challenge: Star in "Starrbooty: The Rebooty", a rusical that reboots RuPaul's hit movie "Starrbooty".; Runway Theme: Wild Wild West; Challenge Winners: Jorgeous and Lydia B Kollins; Points Awarded: 2 to Jorgeous and 2 to Lydia B Kollins; Lip-Sync Song: " Texas Hold'Em" by Beyoncé; Lip-Sync for Your Legacy Winner: Jorgeous; Jorgeous receives $10,000 and an extra point.; Advancing to Semi-Finals: Jorgeous, Lydia B Kollins and Mistress Isabelle Brooks; Eliminated: Kerri Colby, Nicole Paige Brooks and Tina Burner
| 96 | 7 | "Wicked Good" | June 13, 2025 |
A new bracket of queens enters the main stage. For this week's main challenge, the queens must work in pairs to create good and wicked witch looks for the runway, alongside an enchanting backstory. The pairs are: Daya Betty & Ginger Minj, Alyssa Hunter & Cynthia Lee Fontaine, and Acid Betty & Denali. On the runway, the category is Good Witch and Wicked Witch. After critiques, the judges name Daya Betty and Ginger Minj the winning pair and the Top 2 queens of the week. They lip-sync to Defying Gravity by the original Broadway cast of Wicked. Ginger Minj wins the lip-sync and receives $10,000 and an extra point.: Guest Judge: Ariana Grande & Cynthia Erivo; Alternative Judge: Law Roach; Main Challenge: In pairs, design good and wicked witch looks for the runway; Runway Theme: Good Witch and Wicked Witch; Challenge Winners: Daya Betty and Ginger Minj; Points Awarded: 2 to Daya Betty and 2 to Ginger Minj; Lip-Sync Song: "Defying Gravity" by Original Broadway cast of Wicked; Lip-Sync for Your Legacy Winner: Ginger Minj; Ginger Minj receives $10,000 and an extra point.
| 97 | 8 | "Stagecooch" | June 20, 2025 |
The four bottom queens enter the Werk Room and discuss how they will give the points to each other: Cynthia Lee Fontaine gives her point to Alyssa Hunter.; Denali gives her point to Acid Betty.; Acid Betty gives her point to Denali.; Alyssa Hunter gives her point to Cynthia Lee Fontaine.; For this week's main challenge, the queens perform in the Stagecoach-inspired drag festival Stagecooch. In two groups, the contestants will perform one of two country songs with original verses: "Key Your Car" and "Trailer Hitch". The contestants self-select teams and each group is responsible for staging. Cynthia Lee Fontaine, Daya Betty, and Ginger Minj select "Key Your Car". Acid Betty, Alyssa Hunter, and Denali select "Trailer Hitch". On the runway, the category is "Night of a Thousand Mileys". After critiques, Denali and Ginger Minj are named the Top 2 queens of the week. They lip-sync to "See You Again" by Miley Cyrus. Ginger Minj wins the lip-sync, winning $10,000 and an additional point.: Guest Judge: Jamal Sims; Alternative Judge: Ross Matthews; Main Challenge: Perform in the Stagecoach-inspired drag festival.; Runway Theme: Night of a Thousand Mileys; Challenge Winners: Denali and Ginger Minj; Points Awarded: 2 to Denali and 2 to Ginger Minj; Lip-Sync Song: "See You Again" by Miley Cyrus; Lip-Sync for Your Legacy Winner: Ginger Minj; Ginger Minj receives $10,000 and an extra point.
| 98 | 9 | "The Golden Bitchelor" | June 27, 2025 |
The four bottom queens enter the Werk Room and discuss how they will give the points to each other: Cynthia Lee Fontaine gives her point to Daya Betty.; Daya Betty gives her point to Cynthia Lee Fontaine.; Acid Betty gives her point to Cynthia Lee Fontaine.; Alyssa Hunter gives her point to Cynthia Lee Fontaine.; For this week's main challenge, the queens improv in a dating show in which the contestants play dogs courting a Golden Retriever played by American actor Zane Phillips.: Acid Betty is a dominatrix-inspired Dobermann.; Cynthia Lee Fontaine is a Chihuahua.; Alyssa Hunter is a promiscuous mutt.; Ginger Minj plays a drunk St. Bernard.; Daya Betty is a Poodle.; Denali is a "needy" emotional support Spaniel.; On the runway, the category is "Paper Dolls". After critiques, Daya Betty and Ginger Minj are named the Top 2 queens of the week. They lip-sync to "Mama Used to Say" by Junior. Daya Betty wins the lip-sync, winning $10,000 and an additional point. After the lip-sync, the bottom queens award their final MVQ points on the main stage.: Cynthia Lee Fontaine gives her point to Alyssa Hunter.; Denali gives her point to Acid Betty.; Alyssa Hunter gives her point to Denali.; Acid Betty gives her point to Cynthia Lee Fontaine.; With the most points, Cynthia Lee Fontaine, Daya Betty and Ginger Minj advance from the third bracket to the semi-finals. Acid Betty, Alyssa Hunter and Denali are eliminated. RuPaul also reveals that one eliminated queen will re-enter the competition at the finale.: Guest Judge: Mayan Lopez; Alternative Judge: Ts Madison; Main Challenge: Improv in a dating show in which the contestants play dogs; Runway Theme: Paper Dolls; Challenge Winners: Daya Betty and Ginger Minj; Points Awarded: 2 to Daya Betty and 2 to Gimger Minj; Lip-Sync Song: "Mama Used to Say" by Junior"; Lip-Sync for Your Legacy Winner: Daya Betty; Daya Betty receives $10,000 and an extra point.; Advancing to Semi-Finals: Cynthia Lee Fontaine, Daya Betty and Ginger Minj; Eliminated: Acid Betty, Alyssa Hunter and Denali
| 99 | 10 | "Tournament of All Stars Snatch Game" | July 4, 2025 |
The nine advancing queens from all brackets compete together for the first time. RuPaul announces that for the next two weeks, there will be one winner per main challenge and the bottom two queens will lip sync for their lives, with one queen being eliminated. For this week's main challenge, the queens play the Snatch Game. The performances are as follows: Aja: Samantha 'Cookie Tookie' James; Bosco: Kenny Kerr; Cynthia Lee Fontaine: Count Dracula; Daya Betty: Jane Lynch; Ginger Minj: Reba McEntire; Irene the Alien: Zsa Zsa Gabor; Jorgeous: Pitbull; Lydia B Kollins: Pete Burns; Mistress Isabelle Brooks: Natalie Nunn; On the runway, category is Tirami-Suit. Ginger Minj and Jorgeous receive positive critiques, with Ginger Minj winning the challenge. Aja, Cynthia Lee Fontaine, Lydia B Kollins and Mistress Isabelle Brooks receive negative critiques, with Aja and Lydia B Kollins safe. Cynthia Lee Fontaine and Mistress Isabelle Brooks lip-sync to "Who's Zoomin' Who" (Acappella Mix) by Aretha Franklin. Mistress Isabelle Brooks wins the lip-sync and Cynthia Lee Fontaine sashays away.: Guest Judge: Sarah Michelle Gellar; Alternating Judge: Carson Kressley; Main Challenge: Snatch Game; Runway Theme: Tirami-Suit; Challenge Winner: Ginger Minj; Challenge Prize: $10,000 cash prize; Bottom Two: Cynthia Lee Fontaine and Mistress Isabelle Brooks; Lip-sync Song: "Who's Zoomin' Who" (Acappella Mix) by Aretha Franklin; Eliminated: Cynthia Lee Fontaine
| 100 | 11 | "Tournament of All Stars Talent Invitational" | July 11, 2025 |
For this week's mini-challenge, the queens reading each other to filth. Bosco wins the mini-challenge. For the main challenge, the queens performing a talent in Tournament of All Stars Talent Invitational. The acts are as follows: Aja: Original song lip-sync / Voguing; Bosco: Original song lip-sync / Burlesque; Daya Betty: Original song lip-sync; Ginger Minj: Original song lip-sync; Irene the Alien: Original song lip-sync; Jorgeous: Original song lip-sync; Lydia B Kollins: Original song lip-sync / Comedy burlesque; Mistress Isabelle Brooks: Comedy performance; On the runway, category is Foiled Again. Bosco, Ginger Minj, and Jorgeous receive positive critiques, with Bosco winning the challenge. Lydia B Kollins and Mistress Isabelle Brooks receive negative critiques, and are declared the bottom two. Lydia B Kollins and Mistress Isabelle Brooks lip-sync to "Guess" by Charli XCX and Billie Eilish. Lydia B Kollins wins the lip-sync and Mistress Isabelle Brooks sashays away. At the end of the episode, RuPaul announces that the eliminated queens may have a chance to re-enter the competition through a wild card lottery. Three judges each choose one eliminated queen whom they think deserves another shot at winning the competition. Ross Mathews chooses Mistress Isabelle Brooks, Ts Madison chooses Kerri Colby, and Michelle Visage also chooses Kerri Colby. The wild card lottery result will be announced in the finale.: Guest Judge: Devery Jacobs; Alternating Judge: Law Roach; Mini-Challenge: Reading is Fundamental; Mini-Challenge Winner: Bosco; Mini-Challenge Prize: $2,500 cash prize; Main Challenge: Perform a talent in Tournament of All Stars Talent Invitational; Runway Theme: Foiled Again; Challenge Winner: Bosco; Challenge Prize: $10,000 cash prize; Bottom Two: Lydia B Kollins and Mistress Isabelle Brooks; Lip-sync Song: "Guess" by Charli XCX and Billie Eilish; Eliminated: Mistress Isabelle Brooks
| 101 | 12 | "Tournament of All Stars Smackdown for the Crown" | July 18, 2025 |
The wild card lottery winner turns out to be Kerri Colby. Kerri Colby become the Wild Card queen and re-enter the competition. RuPaul announces that before they doing Lip-sync Smackdown for the Crown, the queens will be doing Rate-A-Queen All Stars edition to determine how they face off in Lip-sync Smackdown for the Crown. For this Lip-Sync Smackdown for the Crown, there will be three rounds and seven lip-syncs in a seeded bracket format. Rate-A-Queen results will determine the placement for each bracket. In the first round, Ginger Minj, who placed first in Rate-A-Queen, will face off against Kerri Colby, who placed eighth. Ginger Minj is chosen to pick the song, selecting "Disease" by Lady Gaga. Ginger Minj wins the lip-sync and Kerri Colby sashays away. Lydia B Kollins, who placed second, will face off against Irene the Alien, who placed seventh. Lydia B Kollins is chosen to pick the song, selecting "Joyride" by Kesha. Lydia B Kollins wins the lip-sync and Irene the Alien sashays away. Jorgeous, who placed third, will face off against Aja, who placed sixth. Jorgeous is chosen to pick the song, selecting "Party Lights" by Natalie Cole. Jorgeous wins the lip-sync and Aja sashays away. Daya Betty, who placed fourth, will face off against Bosco, who placed fifth. Bosco is chosen to pick the song, selecting "Show Me How You Burlesque" by Christina Aguilera. Bosco wins the lip-sync and Daya Betty sashays away. In the second round, Bosco will face off against Ginger Minj. Ginger Minj is chosen to pick the song, selecting "Raise Your Glass" by Pink. Ginger Minj wins the lip-sync and Bosco sashays away. The remaining two queens, Lydia B Kollins and Jorgeous, lip-sync to "Whenever, Wherever" by Shakira. Jorgeous wins the lip-sync and Lydia B Kollins sashays away. In the final round, Ginger Minj and Jorgeous lip-sync to "It's Raining Men" by The Weather Girls. After the lip-sync it is declared that Ginger Minj is the winner of the season, leaving Jorgeous as runner-up and receives a $25,000 cash prize.: Alternating Judge: Carson Kressley and Ross Mathews; Returned: Kerri Colby; Main Challenge: Participate in a Lip-sync Smackdown for the Crown; Lip-Sync Songs: "Disease" by Lady Gaga, "Joyride" by Kesha, "Party Lights" by Natalie Cole, "Show Me How You Burlesque" by Christina Aguilera, "Raise Your Glass" by Pink, "Whenever, Wherever" by Shakira, "It's Raining Men" by The Weather Girls; Round 1 Lip-Sync Winners: Ginger Minj, Lydia B Kollins, Jorgeous, Bosco; Round 2 Lip-Sync Winners: Ginger Minj and Jorgeous; Eliminated: Kerri Colby, Irene the Alien, Aja, Daya Betty, Bosco, Lydia B Kollins; Runner-up: Jorgeous; Winner of RuPaul's Drag Race All Stars Season 10: Ginger Minj

== Critical reception ==
The tenth season of RuPaul's Drag Race All Stars was generally met with mixed to negative reviews, with criticism generally leaning towards the execution of the new bracket format and the perceived favoritism of Ginger Minj, the winner of the season.

In a recap by Vulture, the finale was rated 2 out of 5 stars and called "shockingly short on personality" and a "bubbly but unshocking end to a lackluster season". A finale recap by Xtra Magazine said the first two brackets of the season could've been considered "the best ever", but the third bracket and the semifinals "put that to bed". A review by TVLine called the crowning of Ginger Minj "unsurprising".

Despite receiving the highest TV viewership ratings since RuPaul's Drag Race All Stars season seven, the final episode for the season, "Tournament of All Stars Smackdown for the Crown", received an IMDb user rating of 2.3 out of 10 with more than 3,600 reviews, the lowest rating in the RuPaul's Drag Race All Stars spin-off.
