= Irene the Alien =

American drag performer

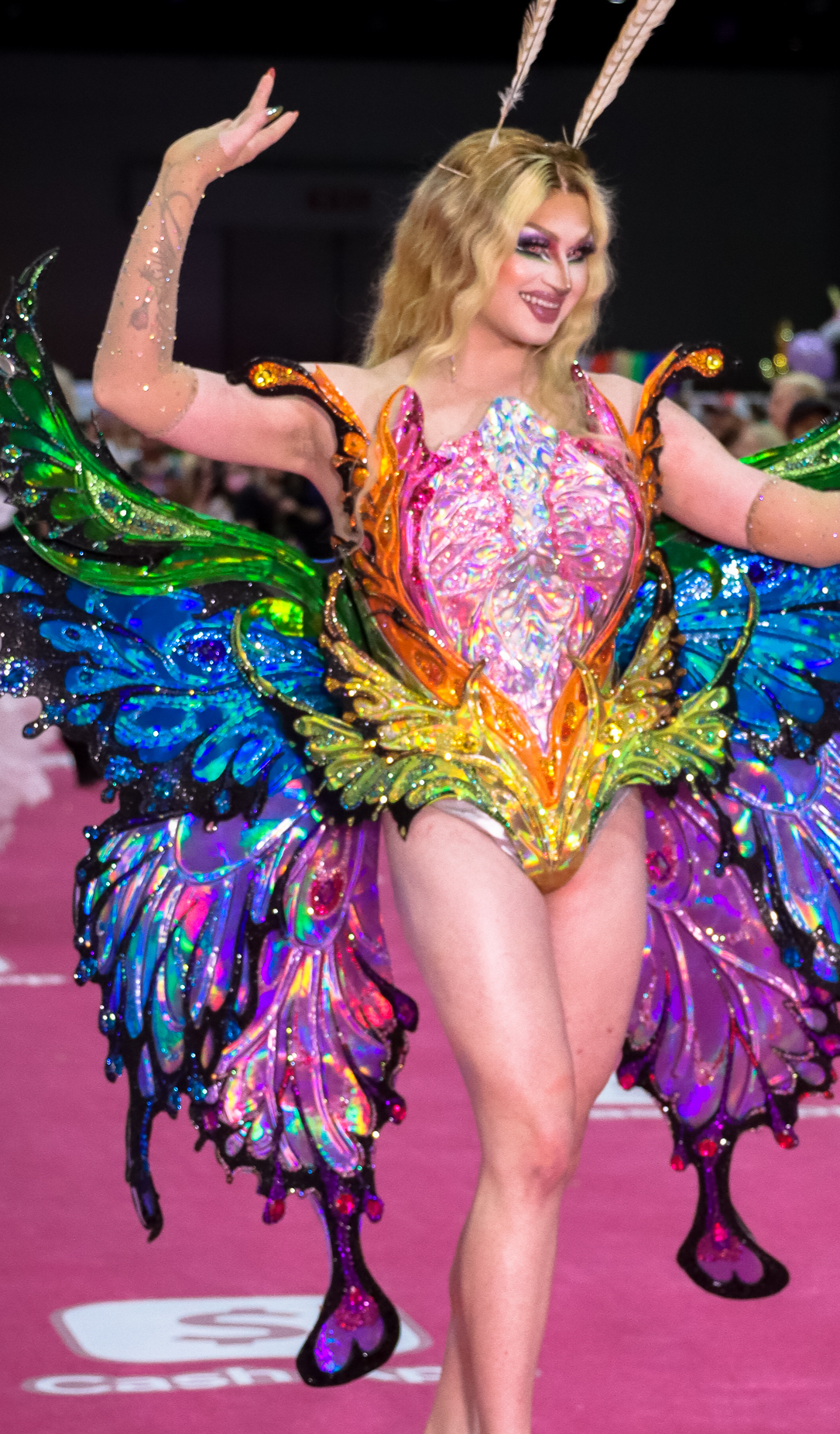
- Irene the Alien at RuPaul's DragCon LA, 2023
- Born: Ian Hill; July 6, 1993 (age 33); Houston, Texas, U.S.
- Other name: Irene Dubois
- Education: Southern Methodist University (BFA)
- Television: RuPaul's Drag Race (season 15) and RuPaul's Drag Race All Stars (season 10)

Irene the Alien, formerly known as Irene Dubois, is the stage name of Ian Hill, an American drag performer most known for competing on the fifteenth season of RuPaul's Drag Race, and the tenth season of RuPaul's Drag Race All Stars.

== Education ==
Hill was enrolled in the theater program at Kinder High School for the Performing and Visual Arts in Houston, Texas. He attended Southern Methodist University and earned a Bachelor of Fine Arts degree in theater studies.

== Career ==
Hill worked with Houston Grand Opera and Texas Repertory Theatre. He began doing drag in Dallas, during college, and has worked as a drag queen since age 25.

Based in Seattle, Irene the Alien has performed at Julia's on Broadway and Queer Bar, where she co-hosted the weekly show "The Mothership" with Bosco, as of 2022. Drag "sister" to Bosco, former drag mother to season 17's contestant Arrietty, Irene is known for her "bizarre and otherworldly" looks and alien-inspired drag. Being a fan of Patricia Arquette and Medium, her former stage name was inspired by Allison DuBois.

Irene the Alien won the So You Think You Can Drag competition in 2018, earning her a cash prize and a recurring role in R Place's drag show "Lashes". She also appeared in Tacocat's music video for "Grains of Salt". During the COVID-19 pandemic, she participated in R Place's weekly online show "Lashes Living Room".

Irene the Alien competed on the fifteenth season of RuPaul's Drag Race. After winning the first mini challenge, she was the first contestant eliminated from the season. For the talent show challenge, she taught viewers how to prepare a glass of ice water. Irene lost the lip sync battle against Amethyst to Ariana Grande's "7 Rings" (2019). Irene wore a purple and silver gown to the season 15 red carpet. She has said she did not receive enough air time on the show.

While season 15 aired, Irene's Instagram following grew from 18,200 to 113,000 (a 521 percent increase).

On April 23, 2025, Irene the Alien was announced as one of eighteen former Drag Race contestants participating in the tenth season of RuPaul's Drag Race All Stars. She competed in the season's first bracket, winning all three challenges and one lip-sync, thus advancing to the semifinals alongside fellow competitors Aja and Bosco.

== Personal life ==
Hill is from Houston. He is gay.

== Filmography ==
=== Television ===
Year	Title	Role	Ref
2023	RuPaul's Drag Race (season 15)	Contestant (16th place)	
2023	RuPaul's Drag Race: Untucked	Contestant (16th place)	
2025	RuPaul's Drag Race All Stars (season 10)	Contestant (5th place)	

=== Web series ===
Year	Title	Role	Notes	Ref
2022	Meet the Queens	Themself	Stand-alone special RuPaul's Drag Race Season 15	
2023	EW News Flash	Themself	Guest	
2023	Whatcha Packin'	Themself	Guest	
2023	Pride Today	Themself	Guest	
2023	BuzzFeed Celeb	Themself	Guest	
2026	Spell Slayers	Themself/Co-Host	Host of Live-Play Magic:The Gathering show with fellow RuPaul's Drag Race Alum Bosco	

== See also ==
- LGBTQ culture in Seattle
- List of people from Houston
- List of people from Seattle
- List of Southern Methodist University people
