= Jorgeous =

American drag queen

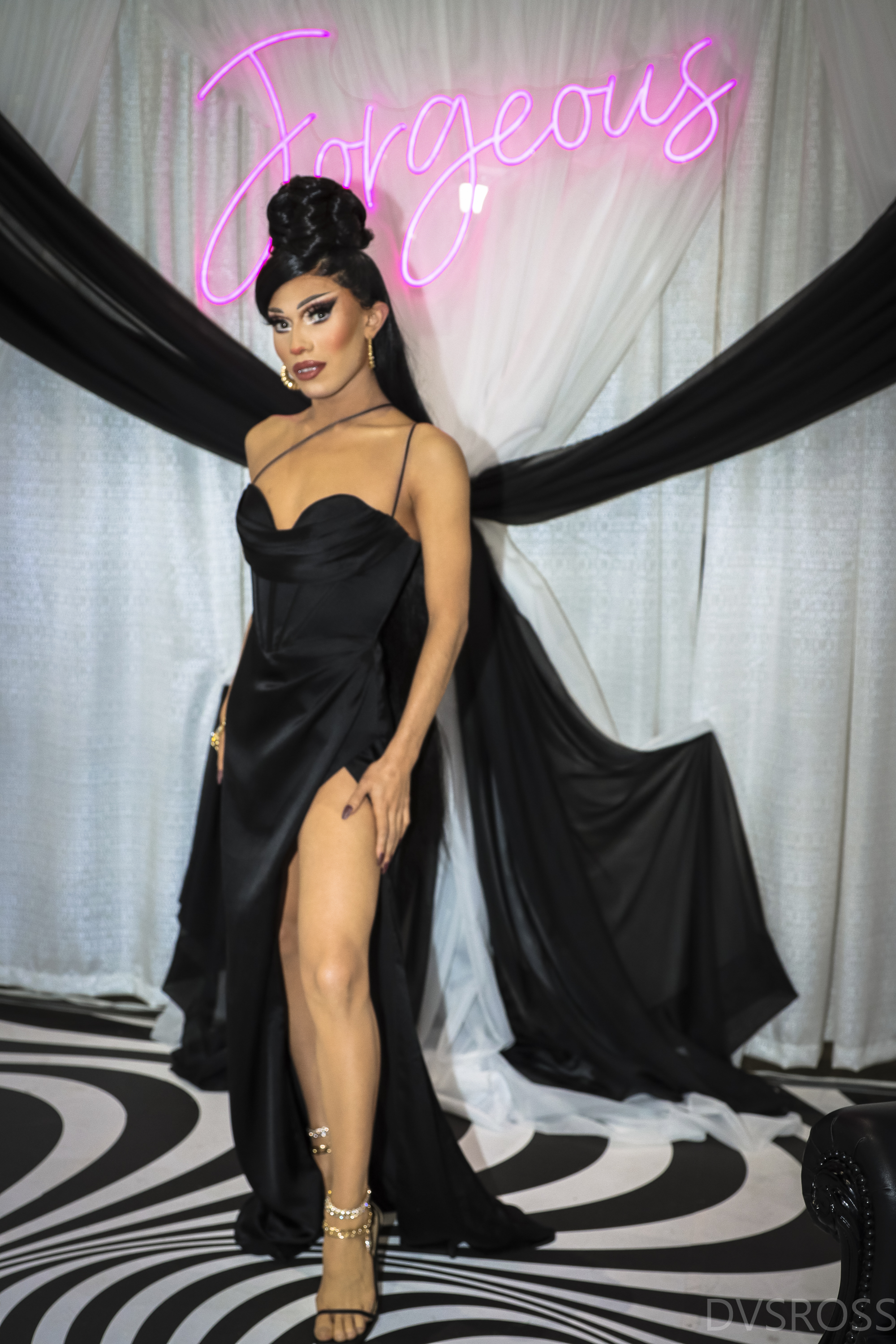
- Jorgeous at RuPaul's DragCon LA, 2022
- Born: Jorge Meza; November 28, 1999 (age 26); San Antonio, Texas, U.S.
- Occupation: Drag queen
- Years active: 2016-present
- Television: RuPaul's Drag Race (season 14); RuPaul's Drag Race All Stars (season 9 and season 10)
- Website: thejorgeous.com

Jorgeous is the stage name of Jorge Meza, a drag performer most known for competing on season 14 of RuPaul's Drag Race and season 9 and season 10 of RuPaul's Drag Race All Stars, the latter of which she was runner-up to Ginger Minj. Meza was born and raised in San Antonio, Texas.

== Early life ==
Meza was born and raised to a Mexican American family in West San Antonio, Texas. He dropped out of high school when he was young. He worked at McDonald's to pay for his drag costumes. His main inspiration is Chi-Chi Rodriguez from the 1995 movie To Wong Foo, Thanks for Everything! Julie Newmar.

== Career ==
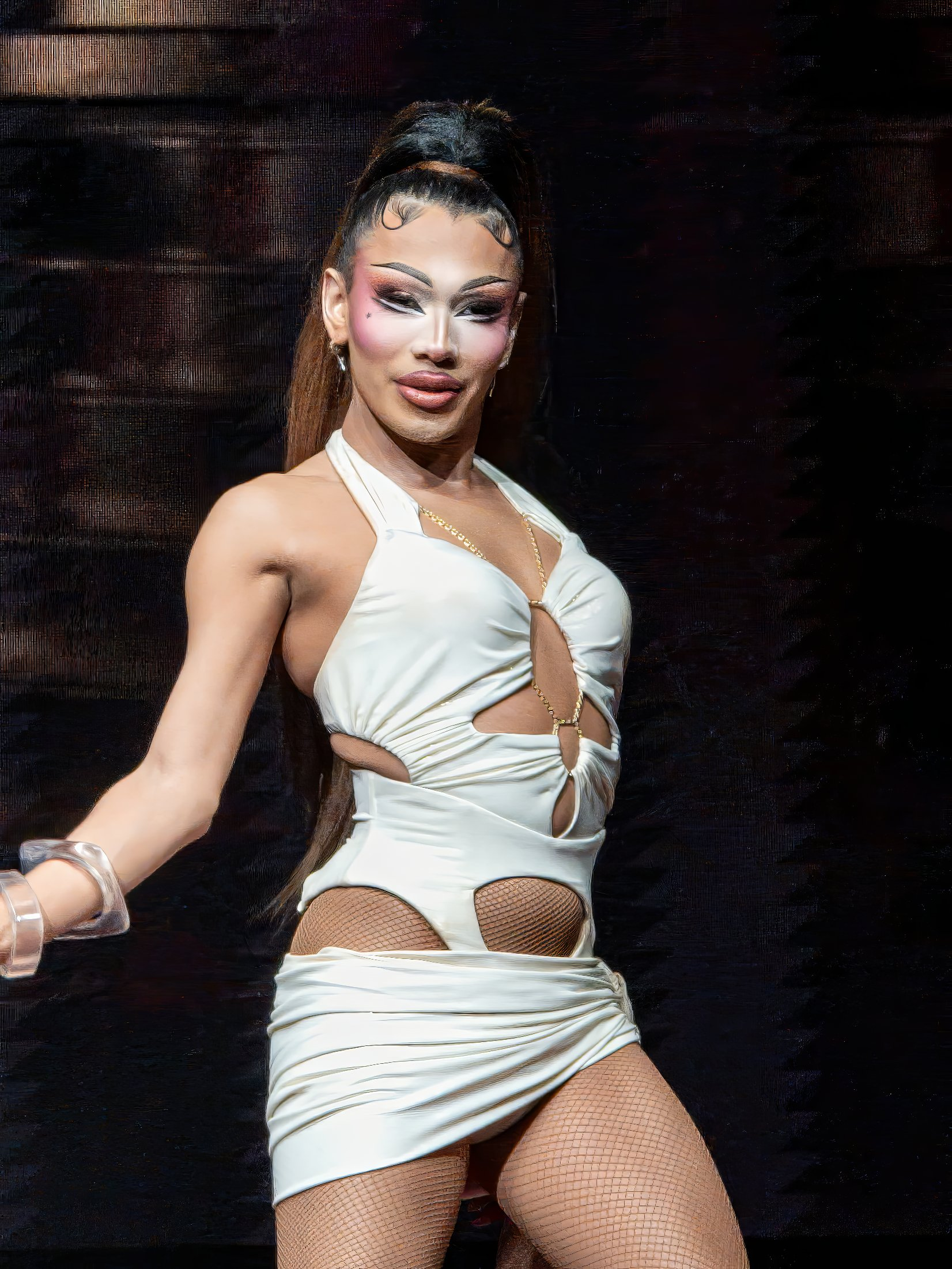
Jorgeous performing with Werq the World

Meza started doing drag and performing in gay bars at the age of 16. He has said, "The name Jorgeous came from the word 'gorgeous' and my boy name, which is Jorge."

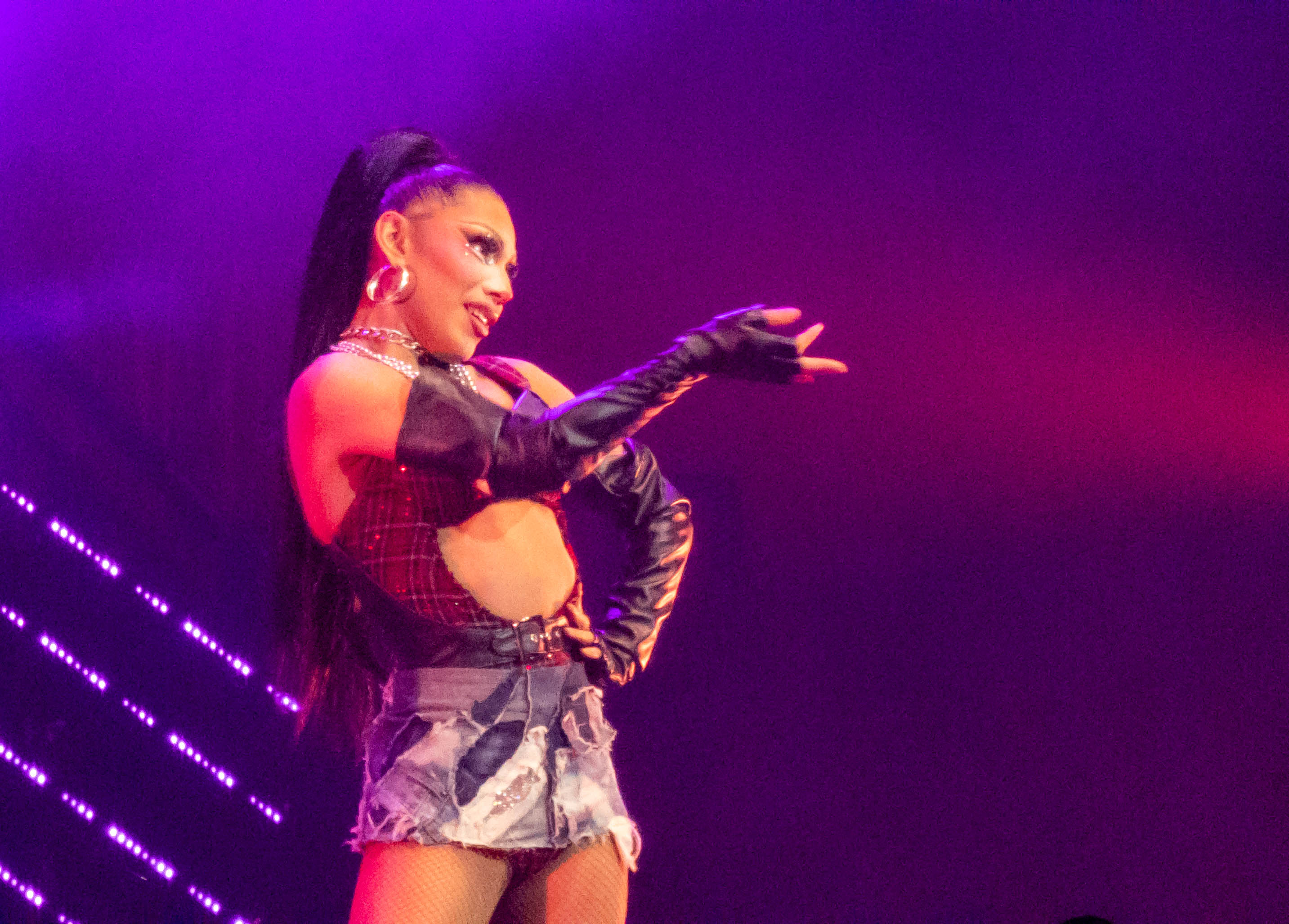
Jorgeous performing as part of the RuPaul's Drag Race All Stars tour, 2024

Jorgeous competed on season 14 of RuPaul's Drag Race. After surviving multiple lip syncs, she was eliminated after failing to impress the judges during a challenge in which contestants roasted series judge Ross Mathews. Stephen Daw of Billboard called her "the season's undisputed lip sync assassin". While filming, Jorgeous had an unaired "budding romance" with fellow contestant Orion Story. Following Drag Race, she joined the Werq the World tour. She was a cast member of the variety show RuPaul's Drag Race Live!, as of 2023.

In 2022, Jorgeous appeared alongside other drag queens in a tribute to Jennifer Lopez at the iHeartRadio Music Awards. She also appeared in the music video for Leland's song "Taste So Good".

On April 23, 2024, Jorgeous was announced as one of the eight contestants competing on the ninth season of RuPaul's Drag Race All Stars.

On April 23, 2025, Jorgeous was announced as one of eighteen former Drag Race contestants participating in the tenth season of RuPaul's Drag Race All Stars. She finished as the runner-up after Ginger Minj won the season finale.

== Personal life ==
Meza is gay and has an older brother who is also gay.

Jorgeous had approximately 300,000 followers on Instagram, as of May 2025. Meza relocated to Tennessee for work at the age of 18. He lived in Nashville as of late 2021.

== Discography ==
=== Featured singles ===
Title	Year	Album	Ref.
"Save a Queen" (with The Cast of RuPaul's Drag Race, Season 14)	2022	Non-album singles	
"He's My Baby (The Ru-Nettes)" (with Jasmine Kennedie & DeJa Skye)	2022	Non-album singles	
"Moulin Ru! the Rusical!" (with The Cast of RuPaul's Drag Race, Season 14)	2022	Moulin Ru! the Rusical! Album	

== Filmography ==
=== Television ===
Year	Title	Role	Notes
2022	RuPaul's Drag Race (season 14)	Herself	Contestant (6th Place)
2022	RuPaul's Drag Race: Untucked	Herself	Contestant (6th Place)
2023	RuPaul's Drag Race All Stars (season 8)	Lip Sync Assassin	Episode: "Forensic Queens"
2023	RuPaul's Drag Race All Stars: Untucked!	Herself	Episode: "All Stars Untucked - Forensic Queens"
2024	RuPaul's Drag Race All Stars (season 9)	Herself	Contestant (4th Place)
2024	RuPaul's Drag Race All Stars: Untucked!	Herself	Contestant (4th Place)
2025	RuPaul's Drag Race All Stars (season 10)	Herself (contestant)	Contestant - (Runner-Up)

=== Music videos ===
Year	Title	Artist	Ref.
2020	"Easy"	Troye Sivan, Kacey Musgraves ft. Mark Ronson	

== See also ==
- List of people from Nashville, Tennessee
- List of people from San Antonio
