= RuPaul's Drag Race All Stars season 9 =

2024 season of RuPaul's Drag Race All Stars

RuPaul's Drag Race All Stars
- Season 9
- Hosted by: RuPaul
- Judges: RuPaul; Michelle Visage; Carson Kressley; Ross Mathews; Ts Madison
- No. of contestants: 8
- Winner: Angeria Paris VanMicheals
- Runners-up: Roxxxy Andrews; Vanessa Vanjie
- Companion show: RuPaul's Drag Race All Stars: Untucked!
- No. of episodes: 12

Release
- Original network: Paramount+; WOW Presents Plus
- Original release: May 17 – July 26, 2024

Season chronology
- ← Previous; Season 8 Next → Season 10

The ninth season of RuPaul's Drag Race All Stars premiered on Paramount+ on May 17, 2024.

The cast was announced on April 23, 2024, and featured eight queens. For the first time in the show's history, the contestants competed for a $200,000 contribution, provided by The Palette Fund, to a charity of their choice.

The winner of the ninth season of RuPaul’s Drag Race All Stars was Angeria Paris VanMicheals. Roxxxy Andrews and Vanessa Vanjie placed as the runners-up. Nina West won the Double Diamond vote from her fellow contestants, doubling her total badge count.

== Contestants ==
Ages, names, and cities stated are at time of filming.

Contestants of RuPaul's Drag Race All Stars season 9 and their backgrounds
Contestant	Age	Hometown	Original season(s)	Original placements	Outcome	Raised	Charity
Angeria Paris VanMicheals	29	Atlanta, Georgia	Season 14	3rd place	Winner	$231,500	NBJC
Roxxxy Andrews	40	Orlando, Florida	Season 5	Runner-up	Runners-up	$64,000	Miracle of Love
Roxxxy Andrews	40	Orlando, Florida	All Stars 2	4th place	Runners-up	$64,000	Miracle of Love
Vanessa Vanjie (Note: Vanessa Vanjie was referred to as Vanessa Vanjie Mateo on her previous seasons.)	31	Los Angeles, California	Season 10	14th place	Runners-up	$31,500	ASPCA
Vanessa Vanjie	31	Los Angeles, California	Season 11	5th place	Runners-up	$31,500	ASPCA
Gottmik	26	Los Angeles, California	Season 13	3rd place	4th place	$29,000	Trans Lifeline
Jorgeous	23	Los Angeles, California	Season 14	6th place	4th place	$14,000	NAMI
Nina West	45	Columbus, Ohio	Season 11	6th place (Note: Nina West was voted Miss Congeniality on her original season.)	4th place	$11,500	The Trevor Project
Plastique Tiara	26	Dallas, Texas	Season 11	8th place	4th place	$6,500	TAAF
Shannel	44	Las Vegas, Nevada	Season 1	4th place	4th place	$11,500	ADAA
Shannel	44	Las Vegas, Nevada	All Stars 1	3rd place	4th place	$11,500	ADAA

== Contestant progress ==
Legend:

Angeria Paris VanMicheals won RuPaul's Drag Race All Stars season 9.
Roxxxy Andrews and Vanessa Vanjie were the runners-up.
Nina West was voted to receive the Double Diamond (DD) by fellow contestants and doubled her Beautiful Benefactress Badges count.
WIN indicates that the contestant won the challenge, a Beautiful Benefactress Badge and the Lip Sync for Your Charity.
TSW (Talent Show Winner) indicates that the contestant won the Slay It Forward Variety Extravaganza and earned three Beautiful Benefactress Badges.
TOP2 indicates that the contestant won the challenge and a Beautiful Benefactress Badge, but lost the Lip Sync for Your Charity.
The contestant collected enough points to advance to the Lip Sync for the Crown.
SAFE indicates that the contestant was declared safe by the judges.
CUT indicates that the contestant was cut off by the lip sync winner(s) from earning a Beautiful Benefactress Badge the following week.
ELIM indicates that the contestant was eliminated.

Contestants progress with placements in each episode
Contestant	Episode											Badges	Episode
Contestant	1	2	3	4 (Note: On episode 3, the two Top All Stars were each awarded two badges: one to keep and one to give to another queen at the start of episode 4. Gottmik gave her badge to Vanessa Vanjie and Nina West gave hers to Roxxxy Andrews.)	5	6 (Note: On episode 6, the winner of the mini-challenge, Jorgeous, was awarded a Beautiful Benefactress Badge.)	7	8	9 (Note: On episode 9, the two Top All Stars, Jorgeous and Shannel, were each awarded two Beautiful Benefactress Badges: one to keep and one to give to another queen. The winners gave their extra badges to each other.)	10	12	Badges	12
Angeria Paris VanMicheals	WIN	CUT	SAFE	CUT	SAFE	WIN	WIN	CUT	SAFE	SAFE	TSW	6	Winner
Roxxxy Andrews	CUT	SAFE	SAFE	WIN	WIN	CUT	SAFE	WIN	SAFE	WIN	SAFE	5	Runner-up
Vanessa Vanjie	SAFE	SAFE	SAFE	WIN	SAFE	SAFE	SAFE	SAFE	SAFE	SAFE	TSW	5	Runner-up
Gottmik	SAFE	WIN	WIN	SAFE	CUT	SAFE	CUT	SAFE	SAFE	SAFE	SAFE	2	Eliminated
Jorgeous	TOP2	SAFE	CUT	SAFE	SAFE	SAFE	SAFE	SAFE	WIN	SAFE	SAFE	4	Eliminated
Nina West	SAFE	SAFE	TOP2	SAFE	SAFE	SAFE	TOP2	SAFE	SAFE	SAFE	DD	4	Eliminated
Plastique Tiara	SAFE	TOP2	SAFE	SAFE	TOP2	TOP2	SAFE	TOP2	SAFE	SAFE	SAFE	4	Eliminated
Shannel	SAFE	SAFE	SAFE	SAFE	SAFE	SAFE	SAFE	SAFE	WIN	TOP2	SAFE	3	Eliminated

== Lip syncs ==
Legend:

The contestant was cut off for the first time.
The contestant was cut off for the second time.
The contestant was cut off for the third time.
The contestant won the first round of the Lip Sync LaLaPaRuZa Smackdown and advanced to the second round.
The contestant won the second round of the Lip Sync LaLaPaRuZa Smackdown and advanced to the final round.
The contestant won the final round of the Lip Sync LaLaPaRuZa Smackdown and won the challenge.
The contestant won the Lip Sync for the Crown and was declared the winner of the season.

Episode	Top All Stars			Song	Winner(s)	Cut Off
1	Angeria Paris VanMicheals	vs.	Jorgeous	"Million Dollar Bill (Freemasons Radio Mix)" (Whitney Houston)	Angeria Paris VanMicheals	Roxxxy Andrews
2	Gottmik	vs.	Plastique Tiara	"Jump in the Line (Shake, Senora)" (Harry Belafonte)	Gottmik	Angeria Paris VanMicheals
3	Gottmik	vs.	Nina West	"Banana" (Anitta ft. Becky G)	Gottmik	Jorgeous
4	Roxxxy Andrews	vs.	Vanessa Vanjie	"Black Cat" (Janet Jackson)	Roxxxy Andrews	Angeria Paris VanMicheals
4	Roxxxy Andrews	vs.	Vanessa Vanjie	"Black Cat" (Janet Jackson)	Vanessa Vanjie	Angeria Paris VanMicheals
5	Plastique Tiara	vs.	Roxxxy Andrews	"Super Freaky Girl" (Nicki Minaj)	Roxxxy Andrews	Gottmik
6	Angeria Paris VanMicheals	vs.	Plastique Tiara	"Be My Lover" (La Bouche)	Angeria Paris VanMicheals	Roxxxy Andrews
7	Angeria Paris VanMicheals	vs.	Nina West	"Lovergirl" (Teena Marie)	Angeria Paris VanMicheals	Gottmik
8	Plastique Tiara	vs.	Roxxxy Andrews	"No One Gets the Prize" (Diana Ross)	Roxxxy Andrews	Angeria Paris VanMicheals
9	Jorgeous	vs.	Shannel	"Love Come Home (Subgroovers Music Video Edit)" (Kristine W)	Jorgeous	None (Note: On episode 8, RuPaul announced a revision to the All Stars rules: no one would be cut off the remaining weeks.)
9	Jorgeous	vs.	Shannel	"Love Come Home (Subgroovers Music Video Edit)" (Kristine W)	Shannel	None
Episode	Contestants			Song	Winner	
10	Angeria Paris VanMicheals	vs.	Gottmik	"My Lovin' (You're Never Gonna Get It)" (En Vogue)	Angeria Paris VanMicheals	
10	Plastique Tiara	vs.	Vanessa Vanjie	"When I Grow Up" (The Pussycat Dolls)	Vanessa Vanjie	
10	Nina West	vs.	Shannel	"You Spin Me Round (Like a Record)" (Dead or Alive)	Shannel	
10	Jorgeous	vs.	Roxxxy Andrews	"Holding Out for a Hero" (Bonnie Tyler)	Roxxxy Andrews	
10	Shannel	vs.	Vanessa Vanjie	"I'm Every Woman" (Chaka Khan)	Shannel	
10	Angeria Paris VanMicheals	vs.	Roxxxy Andrews	"Groove Is in the Heart" (Deee-Lite)	Roxxxy Andrews	
10	Roxxxy Andrews	vs.	Shannel	"Break Free" (Ariana Grande ft. Zedd)	Roxxxy Andrews	
Episode	Finalists			Song	Winner	
12	Angeria Paris VanMicheals vs. Roxxxy Andrews vs. Vanessa Vanjie			"Rhythm Nation" (Janet Jackson)	Angeria Paris VanMicheals	

== Guest judges ==
On May 1, the celebrity guest judges for this season were revealed:

- Keke Palmer, American actress, singer, and television host
- Stephanie Hsu, American actress
- Anitta, Brazilian singer, songwriter, dancer, actress, and television host
- Brothers Osborne, American country music duo
- Alec Mapa, American actor, comedian and writer
- Ruta Lee, Canadian-American-Lithuanian actress and dancer
- Colton Haynes, American actor and model
- Jeremy Scott, American fashion designer
- Kristine W, American singer, songwriter, multi-instrumentalist, and entrepreneur
- Connie Britton, American actress

=== Special guests ===
Guests who appeared in episodes, but did not judge on the main stage.

Episode 3

- Terrence Meck, co-founder and president of The Palette Fund
- David Petruschin (Raven), runner-up of both RuPaul's Drag Race season 2 and All Stars 1
- Kevin Bertin (Monét X Change), contestant on RuPaul's Drag Race season 10, winner of All Stars 4, and runner-up of All Stars 7

Episode 5

- The Teletubbies: Tinky Winky, Dipsy, Laa-Laa, and Po
- Tracy Tutor, American real estate mogul

Episode 6

- Bob the Drag Queen, winner of RuPaul's Drag Race season 8

Episode 9

- David Steinberg, composer
- Miguel Zarate, choreographer

Episode 12

- Kamala Harris, incumbent Vice President of the United States
- Cheyenne Jackson, actor
- Jamal Sims, choreographer
- Lance Bass, singer
- Leslie Jones, comedian and actress
- Kylie Sonique Love, contestant on RuPaul's Drag Race season 2 and winner of RuPaul's Drag Race All Stars season 6
- Jimbo, contestant on Canada's Drag Race season 1, RuPaul's Drag Race: UK vs. the World series 1, and winner of RuPaul's Drag Race All Stars season 8

== Episodes ==
No. overall	No. in season	Title	Original release date
78	1	"Drag Queens Save the World"	May 17, 2024
Eight previous contestants from the Drag Race Franchise enter the workroom. RuPaul reveals the season's format: the contestants are playing for their chosen charities and, similar to All Stars 7, there will be no eliminations throughout the season. Instead, the Top 2 All Stars of the week each receive a Beautiful Benefactress Badge, then participate in a Lip-Sync for Your Legacy. The winner of the lip-sync earns a $10,000 charity donation and the opportunity to "cut off" one of the six safe queens, meaning that even if she wins the next week's challenge, she will be prevented from winning a badge. At the end of the season, the three queens with the most Beautiful Benefactress Badges will be eligible for the crown. For the first mini-challenge, the queens read each other to filth. Roxxxy Andrews wins the mini-challenge. For the main challenge, the queens write and perform original verses and choreography to RuPaul's song "Drag Queens Save the World". On the runway, category is "Signature Look, Signature Fragrance". After critiques, the judges highlight Angeria Paris VanMicheals, Jorgeous, Plastique Tiara, and Vanessa Vanjie. Angeria Paris VanMicheals and Jorgeous are the top 2 queens of the week. They lip-sync to "Million Dollar Bill (Freemasons Radio Mix)" by Whitney Houston. Angeria Paris VanMicheals wins the lip-sync and cuts off Roxxxy Andrews from receiving a badge next week.: Guest Judge: Keke Palmer; Alternating Judge: Ross Mathews; Mini-Challenge: Reading is Fundamental; Mini-Challenge Winner: Roxxxy Andrews; Mini-Challenge Prize: A $2,500 charity donation; Main Challenge: Write and perform original verses on RuPaul's "Drag Queens Save the World"; Runway Theme: Signature Look, Signature Fragrance; Challenge Winners: Angeria Paris VanMicheals and Jorgeous; Badges Awarded: 1 to Angeria Paris VanMicheals and 1 to Jorgeous; Lip-Sync Song: "Million Dollar Bill (Freemasons Radio Mix)" by Whitney Houston; Lip-Sync for Your Charity Winner: Angeria Paris VanMicheals; Cut Off: Roxxxy Andrews
79	2	"The Paint Ball"	May 17, 2024
For this week's main challenge, the queens present three looks for the Paint Ball, including a painted look that is constructed in the Werk Room. The categories are "Monochromatica", "Drag Imitates Art", and "Paint Ball Eleganza". The queens' artist inspirations for the second category are as follows: Angeria Paris VanMicheals: Piet Mondrian; Gottmik: Edvard Munch; Jorgeous: Pablo Picasso; Nina West: Tom of Finland; Plastique Tiara: Yayoi Kusama; Roxxxy Andrews: Salvador Dalí; Shannel: Hokusai; Vanessa Vanjie: Vincent van Gogh; After critiques, the judges highlight Gottmik, Plastique Tiara, Roxxxy Andrews, and Shannel. Gottmik and Plastique Tiara are the top 2 queens of the week. They lip-sync to "Jump in the Line" by Harry Belafonte. Gottmik wins the lip-sync and cuts off Angeria Paris VanMicheals from receiving a badge next week.: Guest Judge: Stephanie Hsu; Alternating Judge: Ross Mathews; Main Challenge: Present three looks, including one designed and sewn in the Werk Room, for the Paint Ball; Runway Themes: Monochromatica, Drag Imitates Art, and Paint Ball Eleganza; Challenge Winners: Gottmik and Plastique Tiara; Badges Awarded: 1 to Gottmik and 1 to Plastique Tiara; Lip-Sync Song: "Jump in the Line" by Harry Belafonte; Lip-Sync for Your Charity Winner: Gottmik; Cut Off: Angeria Paris VanMicheals
80	3	"Snatch Game of Love"	May 24, 2024
For this week's main challenge, the queens play the Snatch Game of Love. RuPaul also announces that, this week, the top 2 queens will receive two badges: one for themselves and one to award to another queen of their choosing. The queens will be vying for the love of special guests Kevin Bertin (Monét X Change) and David Petruschin (Raven). Vying for Kevin's love are: Angeria Paris VanMicheals as Marla Gibbs; Jorgeous as John Leguizamo (as Manny the Fanny from Leguizamo's one-man show Mambo Mouth); Roxxxy Andrews as Tasha Salad (a fictional character Roxxxy portrayed on RuPaul's Drag Race season 5 and All Stars 2); Shannel as Liberace; Vying for David's love are: Gottmik as Pal; Nina West as Liberace; Plastique Tiara as Ali Wong; Vanessa Vanjie as Cleopatra; On the runway, category is "A Tail and Two Titties". After critiques, the judges highlight Angeria Paris VanMicheals, Gottmik, Nina West, and Shannel. Gottmik and Nina West are the top 2 queens of the week. They lip-sync to "Banana" by Anitta ft. Becky G. Gottmik wins the lip-sync and cuts off Jorgeous from receiving a badge next week.: Guest Judge: Anitta; Alternating Judge: Carson Kressley; Main Challenge: Impersonate celebrities for the game show "Snatch Game of Love"; Runway Theme: A Tail and Two Titties; Challenge Winners: Gottmik and Nina West; Badges Awarded: 1 to Gottmik and 1 to Nina West (plus 1 each to gift in the following episode); Lip-Sync Song: "Banana" by Anitta ft. Becky G; Lip-Sync for Your Charity Winner: Gottmik; Cut Off: Jorgeous
81	4	"Smokin' Hot Firefighter Makeovers"	May 31, 2024
At the beginning of the episode, Gottmik and Nina West decide to whom they will give the bonus badges they won last week: Gottmik gives hers to Vanessa Vanjie and Nina West gives hers to Roxxxy Andrews. For this week's main challenge, the queens give firefighters pop star makeovers while working in pairs. They also will record verses to "Pussy on Fire" and perform them as three-part girl groups. The pairs are: Angeria Paris VanMicheals & Shannel (The Pussycat Hose), Gottmik & Nina West (The Hose Draggers), Jorgeous & Plastique Tiara (Meow Meow Mixxx), and Roxxxy Andrews & Vanessa Vanjie (The Hoezes). On the runway, category is "Smokin' Hot Pop Stars". After critiques Roxxxy Andrews and Vanessa Vanjie are declared the top 2 queens of the week. They lip-sync to "Black Cat" by Janet Jackson. Both queens win the lip-sync and decide together to cut off Angeria Paris VanMicheals from receiving a badge next week.: Guest Judges: Brothers Osborne; Alternating Judge: Ross Mathews; Main Challenge: In pairs, give a firefighter a pop star makeover and perform with them as a girl group; Runway Theme: Smokin' Hot Pop Stars; Challenge Winners: Roxxxy Andrews and Vanessa Vanjie; Badges Awarded: 2 to Roxxxy Andrews (1 from Nina West) and 2 to Vanessa Vanjie (1 from Gottmik); Lip-Sync Song: "Black Cat" by Janet Jackson; Lip-Sync for Your Charity Winners: Roxxxy Andrews and Vanessa Vanjie; Cut Off: Angeria Paris VanMicheals
82	5	"Property Queens"	June 7, 2024
For this week's mini-challenge the queens participate in a Soul Train dance-off with the Teletubbies. Gottmik wins the mini-challenge and a $2,500 charity donation. For this week's main challenge, the queens team up to create real estate commercials to sell campy and extravagant locations. As Angeria had been snipped twice, RuPaul allows her to organize the teams.: Nina and Shannel: Pretty Dead Realty selling Salem, Massachusetts; Plastique and Roxxxy: Keepa Cummins Real Estate selling "Tumbleweed, Texas"; Gottmik and Jorgeous: Cher & Tiff Real Estate selling "Frosty Bits, Alaska"; Angeria and Vanjie: Swamp Pussy Realty selling "Gator Glades, Florida"; On the runway, category is "Day to Night Ruveal". After critiques, Plastique Tiara and Roxxxy Andrews are declared the top 2 queens of the week. They lip-sync to "Super Freaky Girl" by Nicki Minaj. Roxxxy Andrews wins the lip-sync and cuts off Gottmik from receiving a badge next week.: Guest Judge: Alec Mapa; Alternating Judge: Carson Kressley; Mini-Challenge: Teletubbies Soul Train Dance-off; Mini-Challenge Winner: Gottmik; Mini-Challenge Prize: A $2,500 charity donation; Main Challenge: In pairs, create campy real estate commercials; Runway Theme: Day to Night Ruveal; Challenge Winners: Plastique Tiara and Roxxxy Andrews; Badges Awarded: 1 to Plastique Tiara and 1 to Roxxxy Andrews; Lip-Sync Song: "Super Freaky Girl" by Nicki Minaj; Lip-Sync for Your Charity Winner: Roxxxy Andrews; Cut Off: Gottmik
83	6	"The National Drag Convention Roast"	June 14, 2024
For this week's mini-challenge the queens answer questions in a straw poll, where they earn points for answering with the majority. Jorgeous wins the mini-challenge alongside a badge. For this week's main challenge, the queens roast each other and the judges at a drag political convention. As the mini-challenge winner Jorgeous gets to select the set order. On the runway, category is "Atomic Blonde". After critiques, the judges highlight Angeria Paris VanMicheals, Jorgeous, Plastique Tiara, Roxxxy Andrews, and Shannel. Angeria Paris VanMicheals and Plastique Tiara are declared the top 2 queens of the week. They lip-sync to "Be My Lover" by La Bouche. Angeria Paris VanMicheals wins the lip-sync and cuts off Roxxxy Andrews from receiving a badge next week.: Guest Judge: Ruta Lee; Alternating Judge: Carson Kressley; Mini-Challenge: Straw Poll; Mini-Challenge Winner: Jorgeous; Mini-Challenge Prize: A $2,500 charity donation and a badge; Main Challenge: Deliver a drag political convention roast; Runway Theme: Atomic Blonde; Challenge Winners: Angeria Paris VanMicheals and Plastique Tiara; Badges Awarded: 1 to Angeria Paris VanMicheals, 1 to Plastique Tiara, and 1 to Jorgeous (from the mini-challenge); Lip-Sync Song: "Be My Lover" by La Bouche; Lip-Sync for Your Charity Winner: Angeria Paris VanMicheals; Cut Off: Roxxxy Andrews
84	7	"Meeting in the Ladies Room"	June 21, 2024
For this week's mini-challenge the queens have to carry pieces of fruit across the werkroom using their thighs. Nina West wins the mini-challenge and immunity from being cut off. For this week's main challenge, the queens act in a two-person scene opposite RuPaul. Each queen is assigned a scene based on a campy film or TV series: Angeria Paris VanMicheals: Mildred Pierce; Gottmik: The Mirror Crack'd; Jorgeous: The Boys in the Band; Nina West: Valley of the Dolls; Plastique Tiara: All About Eve; Roxxxy Andrews: Dynasty; Shannel: Mommie Dearest; Vanessa Vanjie: Showgirls; On the runway, category is "Widow, Weep for Me". After critiques, the judges highlight Angeria Paris VanMicheals, Gottmik, Nina West, and Vanessa Vanjie. Angeria Paris VanMicheals and Nina West are declared the top 2 queens of the week. They lip-sync to "Lovergirl" by Teena Marie. Angeria Paris VanMicheals wins the lip-sync and cuts off Gottmik from receiving a badge next week. Since Nina West did not need the immunity she won in the mini-challenge, she is awarded a $2,500 charity donation instead.: Guest Judge: Colton Haynes; Alternating Judge: Carson Kressley; Mini-Challenge: Fruity Patootie; Mini-Challenge Winner: Nina West; Mini-Challenge Prize: Immunity from being cut off (later substituted for a $2,500 charity donation); Main Challenge: Act in a campy two-person scene opposite RuPaul; Runway Theme: Widow, Weep for Me; Challenge Winners: Angeria Paris VanMicheals and Nina West; Badges Awarded: 1 to Angeria Paris VanMicheals and 1 to Nina West; Lip-Sync Song: "Lovergirl" by Teena Marie; Lip-Sync for Your Charity Winner: Angeria Paris VanMicheals; Cut Off: Gottmik
85	8	"Make Your Own Kind of Rusic"	June 28, 2024
For this week's mini-challenge the queens have to photobomb famous vacation locales. Nina West wins the mini-challenge and a $2,500 charity donation. For this week's main challenge, the queens create a look inspired by a RuPaul song: Angeria Paris VanMicheals: "Cake & Candy"; Gottmik: "New Friends Silver, Old Friends Gold"; Jorgeous: "I Bring the Beat"; Nina West: "Cha Cha Bitch"; Plastique Tiara: "Star Baby"; Roxxxy Andrews: "Lady Cowboy"; Shannel: "Hey Sis, It's Christmas"; Vanessa Vanjie: "Kitty Girl"; On the runway, category is "Make Your Own Kind of Rusic". After critiques, the judges highlight Gottmik, Nina West, Plastique Tiara, and Roxxxy Andrews. Plastique Tiara and Roxxxy Andrews are declared the top 2 queens of the week. They lip-sync to "No One Gets the Prize" by Diana Ross. Roxxxy Andrews wins the lip-sync and cuts off Angeria Paris VanMicheals from receiving a badge next week. RuPaul announces that this will be the last week where a queen is cut off.: Guest Judge: Jeremy Scott; Alternating Judge: Ts Madison; Mini-Challenge: Photobomb a vacation locale; Mini-Challenge Winner: Nina West; Mini-Challenge Prize: A $2,500 charity donation; Main Challenge: Create a look inspired by a RuPaul song; Runway Theme: Make Your Own Kind of Rusic; Challenge Winners: Plastique Tiara and Roxxxy Andrews; Badges Awarded: 1 to Plastique Tiara and 1 to Roxxxy Andrews; Lip-Sync Song: "No One Gets the Prize" by Diana Ross; Lip-Sync for Your Charity Winner: Roxxxy Andrews; Cut Off: Angeria Paris VanMicheals
86	9	"Rosemarie's Baby Shower: The Rusical"	July 5, 2024
For this week's main challenge, the queens record vocals and perform in Rosemarie's Baby Shower: The Rusical, which is inspired by the film Rosemary's Baby. The roles are as follows: Angeria Paris VanMicheals: Ruth; Gottmik: Blair; Jorgeous: Morgan; Nina West: Doctor Poltergeist; Plastique Tiara: Rosemarie; Roxxxy Andrews: Hennywise; Shannel: Sidney; Vanessa Vanjie: Rosemarie's Baby; On the runway, category is "Bring Back My Pearls". After critiques, the judges highlight Jorgeous, Nina West, Plastique Tiara, Shannel, and Vanessa Vanjie. Jorgeous and Shannel are declared the top 2 queens of the week. They lip-sync to "Love Come Home (Subgroovers Music Video Edit)" by Kristine W. Both queens win the lip-sync. This week the top 2 queens are awarded two badges, one to keep and one to gift. Jorgeous and Shannel give their second badges to each other.: Guest Judge: Kristine W; Alternating Judge: Ts Madison; Main Challenge: Rosemarie's Baby Shower: The Rusical; Runway Theme: Bring Back My Pearls; Challenge Winners: Jorgeous and Shannel; Badges Awarded: 2 to Jorgeous (1 from Shannel) and 2 to Shannel (1 from Jorgeous); Lip-Sync Song: "Love Come Home (Subgroovers Music Video Edit)" by Kristine W; Lip-Sync for Your Charity Winners: Jorgeous and Shannel
87	10	"Lip-Sync LaLaPaRuZa Smackdown"	July 12, 2024
This week, the queens participate in a Lip-Sync Lalaparuza Smackdown; the two queens who reach the final round will receive badges and will lip-sync for their charity. For most of the lip-syncs, a queen is chosen at random who gets to select their opponent. Their opponent then gets to choose the lip-sync song. First, Gottmik chooses to lip-sync against Angeria Paris VanMicheals, who chooses "My Lovin' (You're Never Gonna Get It)" by En Vogue. Angeria Paris VanMicheals wins the lip-sync and advances to round 2. In the second lip-sync, Vanessa Vanjie chooses Plastique Tiara as her opponent, who chooses "When I Grow Up" by The Pussycat Dolls. Vanessa Vanjie wins and advances to round 2. In the third lip-sync, Nina West chooses Shannel as her opponent, who chooses "You Spin Me Round (Like a Record)" by Dead or Alive. Shannel wins and advances to round 2. As the last two remaining queens, Jorgeous and Roxxxy Andrews must lip-sync. Roxxxy Andrews is randomly selected to pick the song and chooses "Holding Out for a Hero" by Bonnie Tyler. Roxxxy Andrews wins and advances to round 2. In the first lip-sync of round 2, Vanessa Vanjie chooses Shannel as her opponent, who chooses "I'm Every Woman" by Chaka Khan. Shannel wins and advances to the final round. In the second lip-sync of round 2, the two remaining queens, Angeria Paris VanMicheals and Roxxxy Andrews, must lip-sync. The remaining song is "Groove Is in the Heart" by Deee-Lite. Roxxxy Andrews wins and advances to the final round. In the final round Roxxxy Andrews and Shannel lip-sync to "Break Free" by Ariana Grande ft. Zedd. Roxxxy Andrews wins the lip-sync.: Alternating Judge: Ross Mathews; Main Challenge: Participate in a Lip-Sync Lalaparuza Smackdown; Round 1 & 2 Lip-Sync Songs: "My Lovin' (You're Never Gonna Get It)" by En Vogue, "When I Grow Up" by The Pussycat Dolls, "You Spin Me Round (Like a Record)" by Dead or Alive, "Holding Out for a Hero" by Bonnie Tyler, "I'm Every Woman" by Chaka Khan and "Groove Is in the Heart" by Deee-Lite; Round 1 Lip-Sync Winners: Angeria Paris VanMicheals, Roxxxy Andrews, Shannel and Vanessa Vanjie; Challenge Winners: Roxxxy Andrews and Shannel; Badges Awarded: 1 to Roxxxy Andrews and 1 to Shannel; Final Round Lip-Sync Song: "Break Free" by Ariana Grande ft. Zedd; Lip-Sync for Your Charity Winner: Roxxxy Andrews
88	11	"Grand Finale Variety Extravaganza: Part 1"	July 19, 2024
As the queens enter the werkroom they find a pink furry box full of humorous performance prompts; each queen receives a $1,500 charity donation for participating. For this week's mini-challenge the queens have to give a drag makeover to a crew member. All the contestants are declared as mini-challenge winners. RuPaul then announces that the upcoming final main challenge will be a variety extravaganza, the winners of which will receive three badges each. For the rest of the episode the queens prepare for their variety performances and sit down for Tic-Tac lunches with RuPaul. At the end of the episode Ts Madison announces that the queens will vote for one of their competitors to receive the "double diamond", which will double the badges of the recipient and will be announced after all other badges are awarded.: Mini-Challenge: Give a crew member a drag makeover; Mini-Challenge Winner: Everyone
89	12	"Grand Finale Variety Extravaganza: Part 2"	July 26, 2024
For the final main challenge of the season, the queens participate in a variety show. Their acts are as follows: Angeria Paris VanMicheals: Original song lip-sync; Gottmik: Original song lip-sync & guitar playing; Jorgeous: Original song lip-sync; Nina West: Original song lip-sync; Plastique Tiara: Original song lip-sync; Roxxxy Andrews: Original song lip-sync / burlesque; Shannel: Juggling & balancing; Vanessa Vanjie: Original song lip-sync; On the runway, category is "Grand Finale Eleganza". After critiques, Angeria Paris VanMicheals and Vanessa Vanjie are declared the top 2 queens of the week, winning 3 badges each, and Nina West is announced as the winner of the Double Diamond, doubling her badge total to 4. As the three queens with the most badges Angeria Paris VanMicheals, Roxxxy Andrews, and Vanessa Vanjie are declared as the top three queens of the season. The other five queens are given a $5,000 charity donation. Angeria Paris VanMicheals, Roxxxy Andrews, and Vanessa Vanjie lip-sync to "Rhythm Nation" by Janet Jackson. After the lip-sync it is declared that Angeria Paris VanMicheals is the winner of the season, leaving Roxxxy Andrews and Vanessa Vanjie as runners-up; both queens receive a $25,000 charity donation.: Guest Judge: Connie Britton; Alternating Judge: Ross Mathews; Main Challenge: Slay It Forward Variety Extravaganza; Runway Theme: Grand Finale Eleganza; Challenge Winners: Angeria Paris VanMicheals and Vanessa Vanjie; Badges Awarded: 3 to Angeria Paris VanMicheals, 3 to Vanessa Vanjie, and 2 to Nina West (from the Double Diamond); Final Three: Angeria Paris VanMicheals, Roxxxy Andrews, and Vanessa Vanjie; Lip-Sync Song: "Rhythm Nation" by Janet Jackson; Runners-up: Roxxxy Andrews and Vanessa Vanjie; Winner of RuPaul's Drag Race All Stars Season 9: Angeria Paris VanMicheals
