= Phoenix (drag queen) =

American drag performer

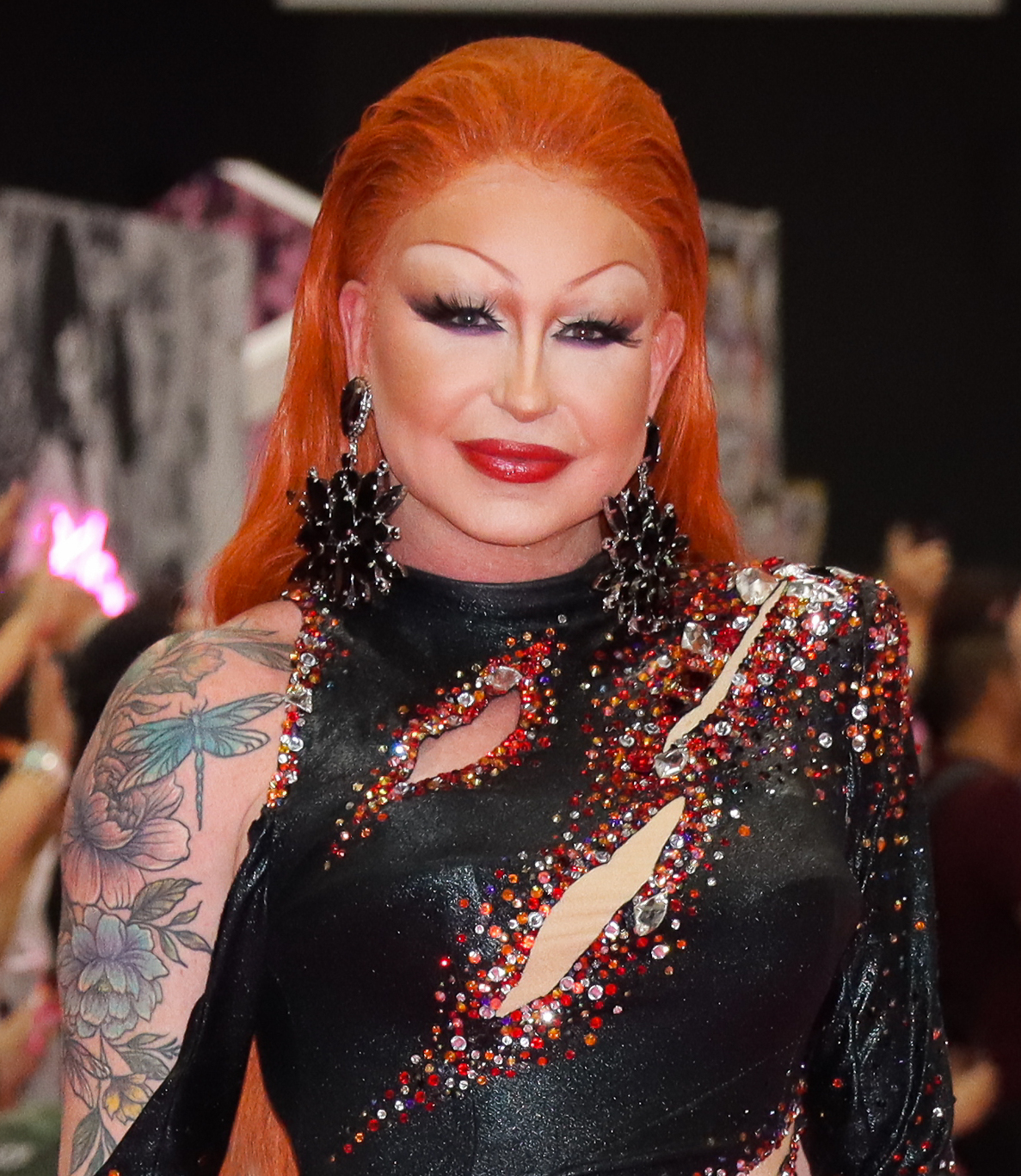
- Phoenix at RuPaul's DragCon LA, 2024
- Born: Brian Trapp; Cumming, Georgia
- Occupation: Drag queen
- Television: RuPaul's Drag Race (season 3) and RuPaul's Drag Race All Stars (season 10)

Phoenix is the stage name of Brian Trapp, an American drag performer who competed on the third season of RuPaul's Drag Race and the tenth season of RuPaul's Drag Race All Stars.

== Career ==
Trapp is a drag performer who competed as Phoenix on the third season of RuPaul's Drag Race. She was the second contestant to be eliminated from the competition. In 1999, Phoenix and her high school friend Christian Castelan visited Atlanta for Pride, held in Piedmont Park. They went to the Starlight Cabaret. She appeared in an episode of Teen Wolf in 2012. In 2024, Phoenix was announced as a contestant on Painting with Raven, a spin-off of Painted with Raven.

On April 23, 2025, Phoenix was announced as one of eighteen former Drag Race contestants participating in the tenth season of RuPaul's Drag Race All Stars.

== Personal life ==
Trapp is from Cumming, Georgia and was living in Atlanta during season 3 and still currently is. He graduated from Forsyth Central High School.

== Television ==
- RuPaul's Drag Race (season 3) (2011)
- Teen Wolf (2012)
- Painting with Raven (2024)
- RuPaul's Drag Race All Stars (season 10) (2025)
