= Papi Chulo's =

Mexican restaurant in Portland, Oregon, U.S.

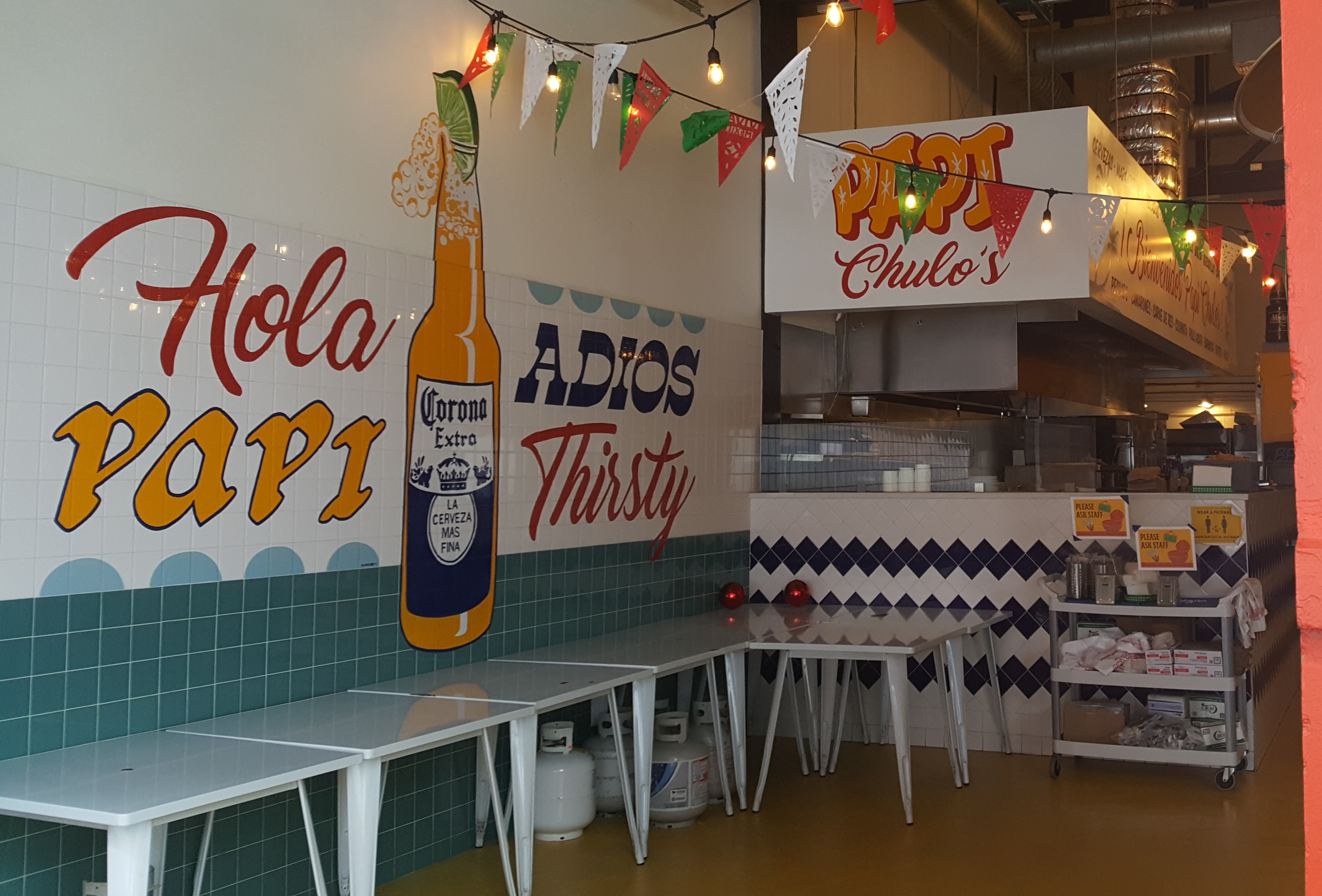
- Interior of the Pearl District restaurant in 2021
- Interactive map of Papi Chulo's

Restaurant information
- Established: December 7, 2019
- Owner: Ramzy Hattar
- Head chef: Antonio Javier Palma Caceres
- Food type: Mexican
- Location: 611 Northwest 13th Avenue; 1451 Northeast Alberta Street, Portland, Multnomah, Oregon, United States
- Coordinates: 45.5275°N 122.6844°W
- Website: papichulospdx.com

Papi Chulo's is a restaurant with two locations in Portland, Oregon, in the United States. The original taqueria in the Pearl District was opened by restaurateur Ramzy Hattar in December 2019, with Antonio Javier Palma Caceres as the chef and Davide Bricca overseeing cocktails. The trio had previously worked together at River Pig Saloon and Two Wrongs, two neighboring establishments also owned by Hattar. A second location opened in northeast Portland in 2023. Papi Chulo's serves Mexican cuisine, such as tacos, burritos, nachos, birria, margaritas, and micheladas.

== Description ==
Papi Chulo's is a Mexican restaurant with two locations in Portland. Eater Portland's Brooke Jackson-Glidden has described the original taqueria, located on 13th Avenue in northwest Portland's Pearl District, as "a colorful counter-service spot" with "design elements reminiscent" of similar establishments in California and Mexico. The interior has an "open-format" kitchen with multiple paintings, including one of the restaurant's name on the kitchen's hood and another of a bottle of Corona with a lime, as well as a mounted marlin above the ordering counter. In 2020, prior to the COVID-19 pandemic, Willamette Week's Nick Zukin described the taqueria as "a popular late-night destination for hungry club and bar patrons".

=== Menu ===
Serving a variety of regional Mexican cuisine, the restaurant's menu has tacos (including Baja fish such as cod and Yucatecan cochinita pibil), burritos, nachos, birria with beef, lengua with habanero, margaritas on tap, and micheladas. Various ingredients include chile de árbol, cochinita pibil, consommé, queso blanco, salsa with guajillo chili, and "locally nixtamalized" tortillas made from Three Sisters masa.

The pepper margarita has a syrup made on-site and uses habaneros, poblanos, and three other types of peppers. The "Princesa" margarita contains strawberry syrup and lime juice. The micheladas and Bloody Mary come with Tajín seasoning on the rim. Palomas are also featured on the drink menu.

== History ==
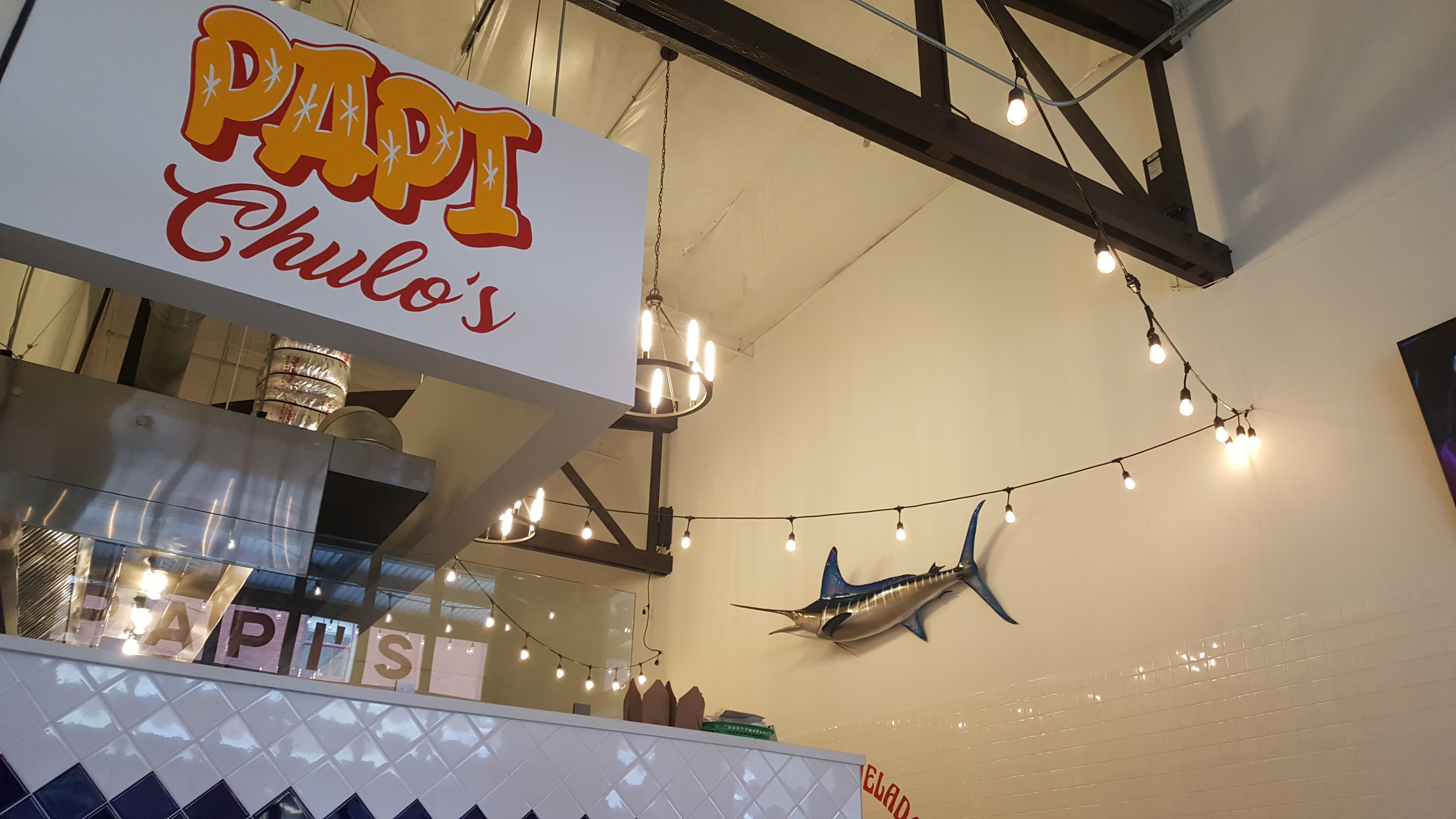
The Pearl District restaurant's interior has strung lights and a mounted marlin

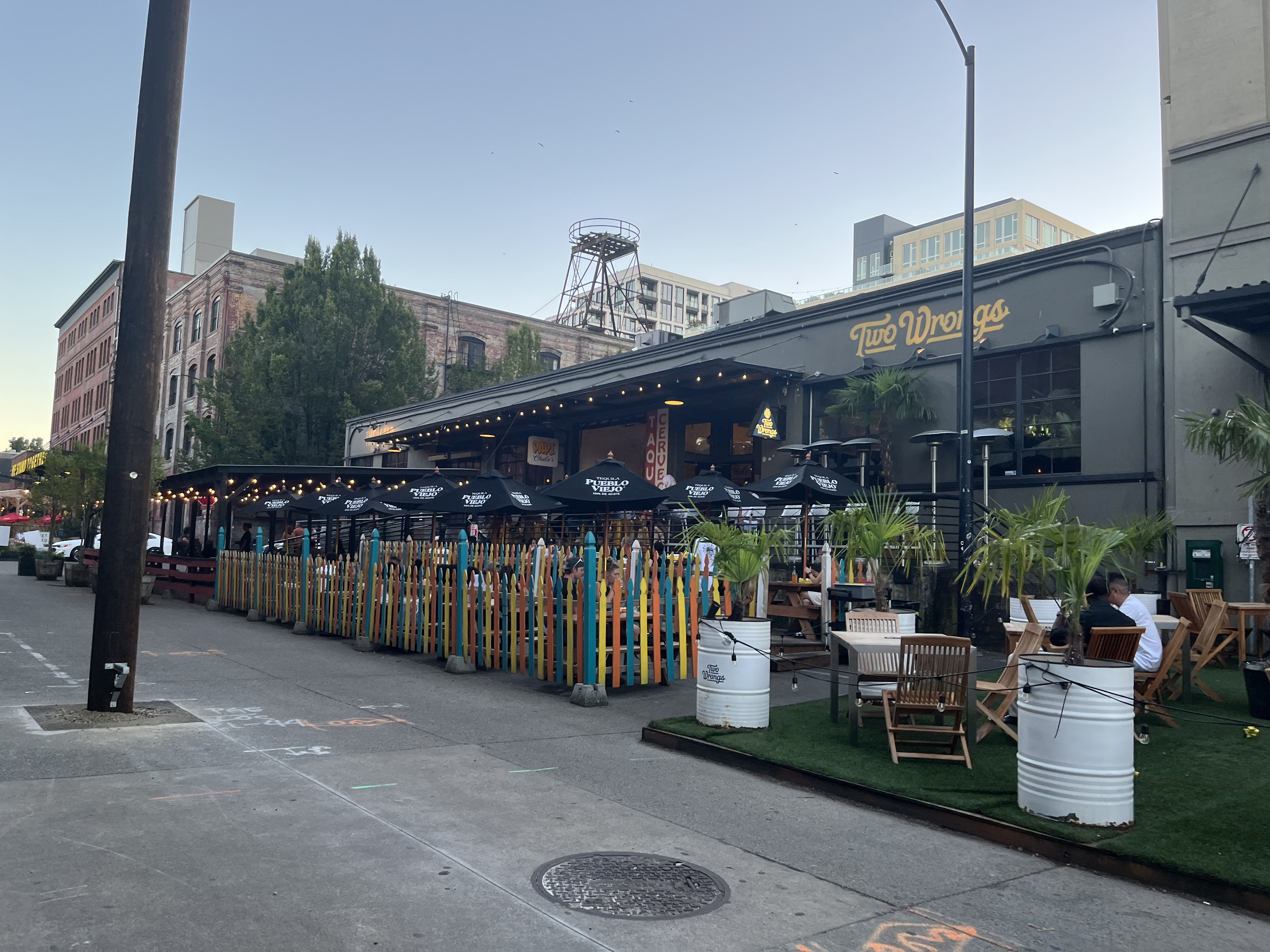
Exterior of the Pearl District location next to Two Wrongs, 2022

The restaurant opened on December 7, 2019, in the space formerly occupied by PBJ's Grilled. Restaurateur Ramzy Hattar owns the taqueria, along with neighboring establishments River Pig Saloon and Two Wrongs. He had started developing a business plan for a taco restaurant after the chain Pink Taco reversed plans to open in Portland, and he confirmed the launch of Papi Chulo's in July 2019. The restaurant's opening was slightly delayed; in his September 2019 list of the city's most anticipated restaurant openings for the fall season, Eater Portland's Alex Frane said the taqueria was slated to open on October 23. Hattar opened the restaurant with Antonio Javier Palma Caceres, who was raised in Yucatán and had served as River Pig's chef, as well as Davide Bricca, who oversaw cocktails for both River Pig and Two Wrongs. Food from Papi Chulo's was being served at Two Wrongs by February 2020.

During the COVID-19 pandemic, Papi Chulo's, River Pig, and Two Wrongs served customers in decorated and heated covered tents. With permission from the Portland Bureau of Transportation, Northwest 13th Avenue was closed off to traffic at Hoyt Street, creating a street plaza for dining. Papi Chulo's also continued to operate delivery and takeout services, opting to staff for deliveries rather than partner with a food delivery service (which Hattar deemed too expensive), as of May 2020. Sourcing quality beef in 2020 was frustrating and challenging for Hattar, who had to find meat outside SP Provisions because of the pandemic's impact on the food and meat industry.

Someone burglarized the restaurant in October 2020, using a hand truck to remove a safe.

In November 2020, the business confirmed plans for a second location in a new development in northeast Portland's Vernon neighborhood called Alberta Alley. The restaurant opened on February 17, 2023. The outpost has a similar menu and limited indoor seating, as well as a courtyard shared with neighboring establishments.

== Reception ==
In March 2020, The Oregonian's Michael Russell included Papi Chulo's in his overview of "Portland's 40 best inexpensive restaurants" and said the birria tacos "are among the best lunch values you can find downtown". In May, Eater Portland's Brooke Jackson-Glidden included Papi Chulo's in her overview of Portland's "knockout tacos" with delivery and takeout service during the COVID-19 pandemic. In 2023, Papi Chulo's ranked eighth in a list of Portland's "highest-rated" restaurants for tacos, based on Yelp data.

== See also ==
- COVID-19 pandemic in Portland, Oregon
- Hispanics and Latinos in Portland, Oregon
- Impact of the COVID-19 pandemic on the restaurant industry in the United States
- List of Mexican restaurants
- List of restaurant chains in the United States
