= Sissy Bar (Portland, Oregon) =

Defunct gay bar in Portland, Oregon, U.S.

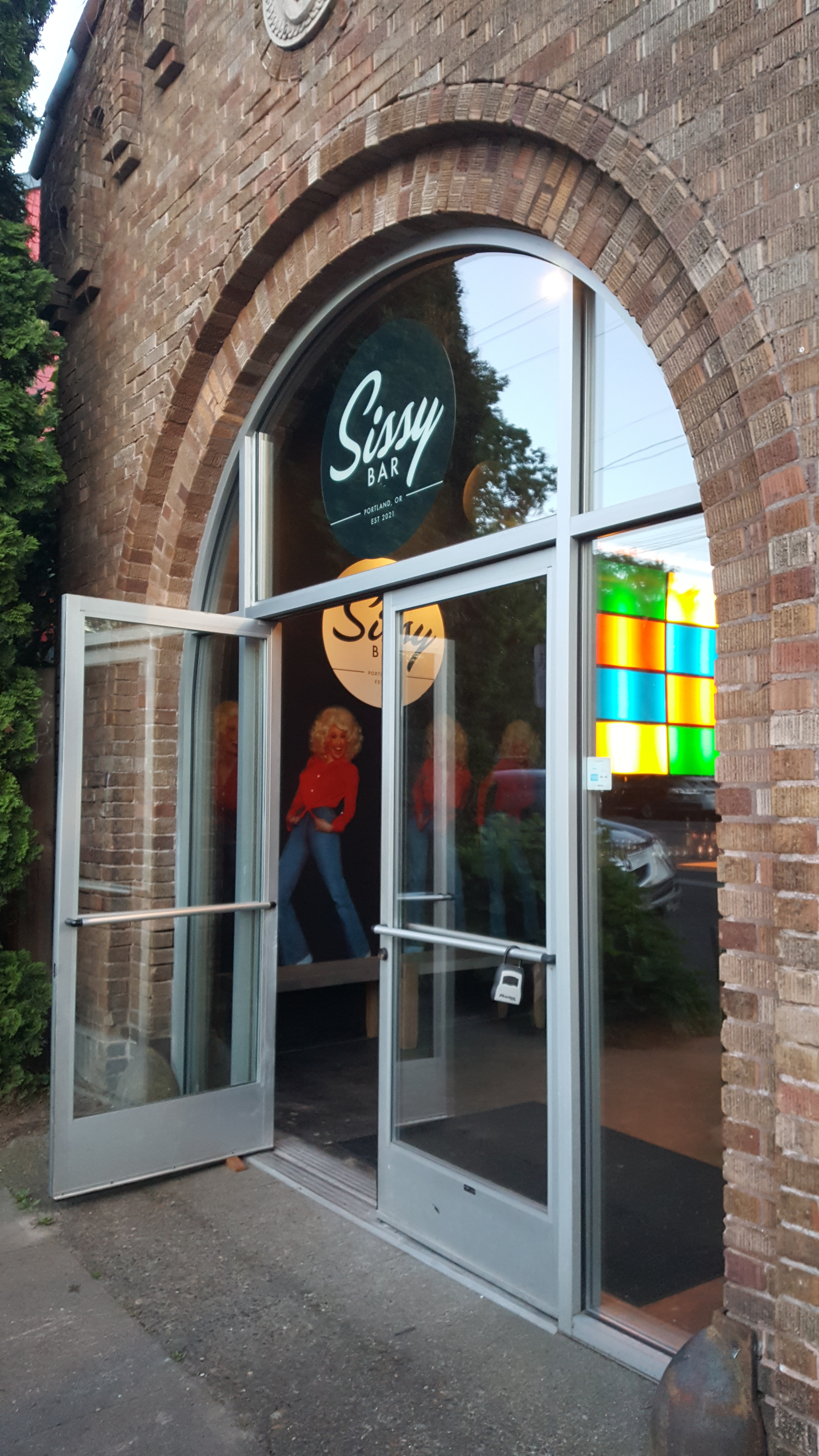
- The bar's exterior, 2022
- Interactive map of Sissy Bar

Restaurant information
- Established: June 2022
- Closed: October 26, 2024
- Owners: Truman Cox; Derek Palmer
- Food type: Colombian
- Location: 1416 Southeast Morrison Street, Portland, Multnomah, Oregon, 97214, United States
- Coordinates: 45.5171°N 122.6511°W
- Website: sissybarportland.com

Sissy Bar was a gay bar in Portland, Oregon, United States. Truman Cox and Derek Palmer opened the video lounge in southeast Portland's Buckman neighborhood in June 2022, near another LGBTQ establishment named Crush Bar. Sissy Bar hosted drag shows, dance parties, and other themed events and played video montages from films and music videos by popular recording artists. The bar served Colombian cuisine, such as ajiaco, arepas, and empanadas. It closed permanently in October 2024, with owners citing the economic impact of the COVID-19 pandemic as the reason.

== Description ==
Sissy Bar was a gay bar on Morrison Street in southeast Portland's Buckman neighborhood, near the LGBTQ establishment Crush Bar. The name for Sissy Bar was a reclamation of the slur "sissy". The bar hosted themed events, drag shows, and dance parties. According to Eater Portland's Brooke Jackson-Glidden, the interior paid homage to Barracuda Lounge, which she described as "a classic New York drag bar". Sissy Bar had a similar backbar and long banquette, as well as illuminated cubes, which Willamette Week's Andrew Jankowski compared to panels on Simon.

Walls displayed photographs of "gay divas", such as Paris Hilton, Jennifer Lopez, Madonna, and Dolly Parton. Televisions played video montages from films and music videos by artists, including Azealia Banks, City Girls, Grimes, and Megan Thee Stallion. Jankowski described the clientele as a "range of legal drinking ages", some of whom "appeared to have just left the office, while others were dressed to impress".

=== Menu ===
Sissy Bar used recipes from the Colombian family of the husband of one of the bar's owners. In addition to cocktails, the bar served Colombian cuisine, such as ajiaco, arepas (chicken and hogao), croquetas de pescado (Colombian fish croquettes), empanadas, frijoles antioqueños, and sudado de pollo (a spiced chicken stew). The nachos had Juanita's tortilla chips with cheese, jalapeño, sour cream, and tomato, and the avocado salad had guacamole with cucumber, lime, and scallion.

Among the "fruit-forward, pop culture-packed" cocktails were the Baby Got Back; the In the Heat of the Night; the She's All That, which had tequila, elderflower, and berry syrup; the Sissy Galore, which had lemon juice and grapefruit with orange bitters and Aviation American Gin; the Sissy Mule; the Sissy MANhattan; and the Will Smith Punch, which referred to the Chris Rock–Will Smith slapping incident (2022).

== History ==
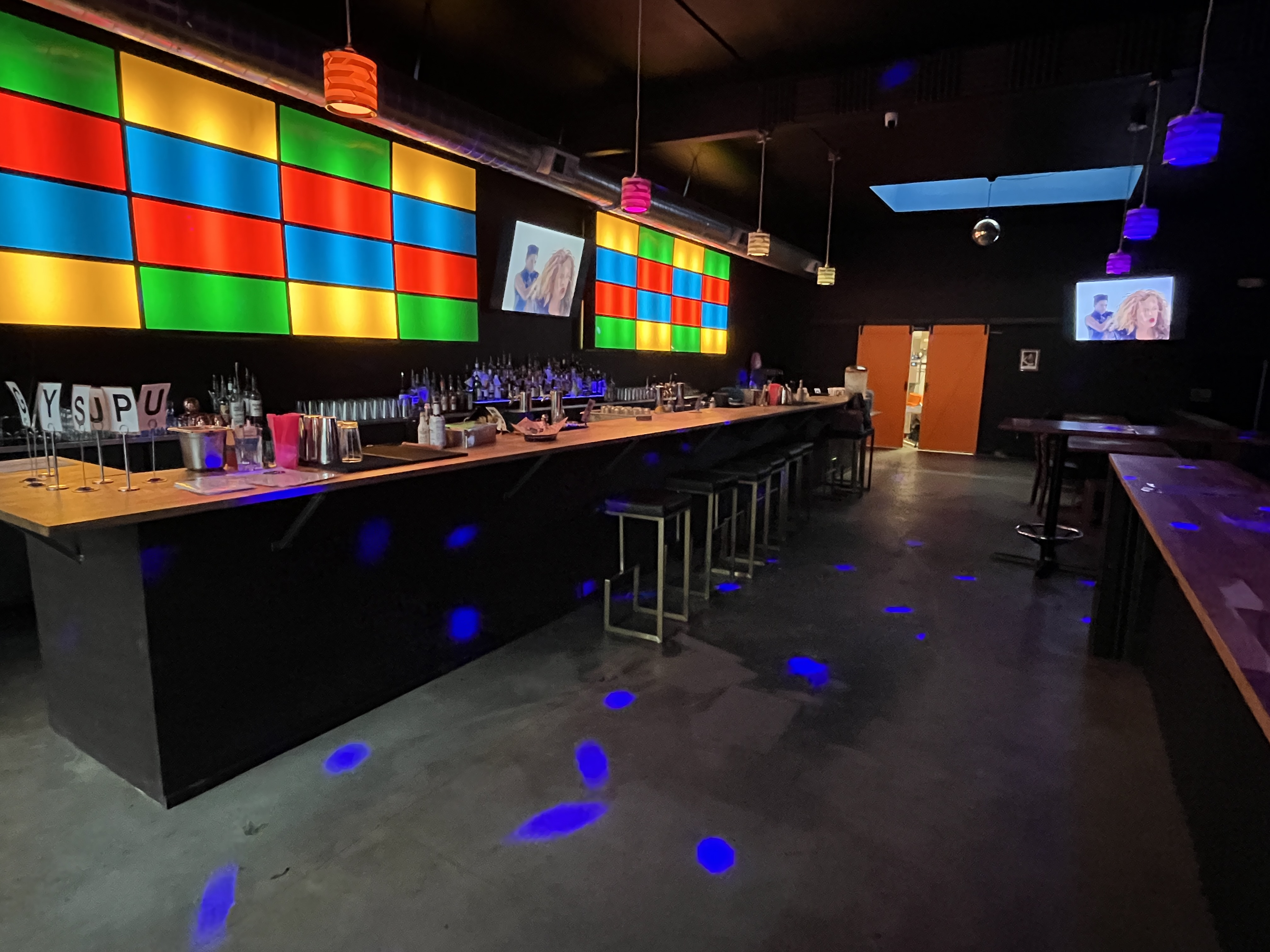
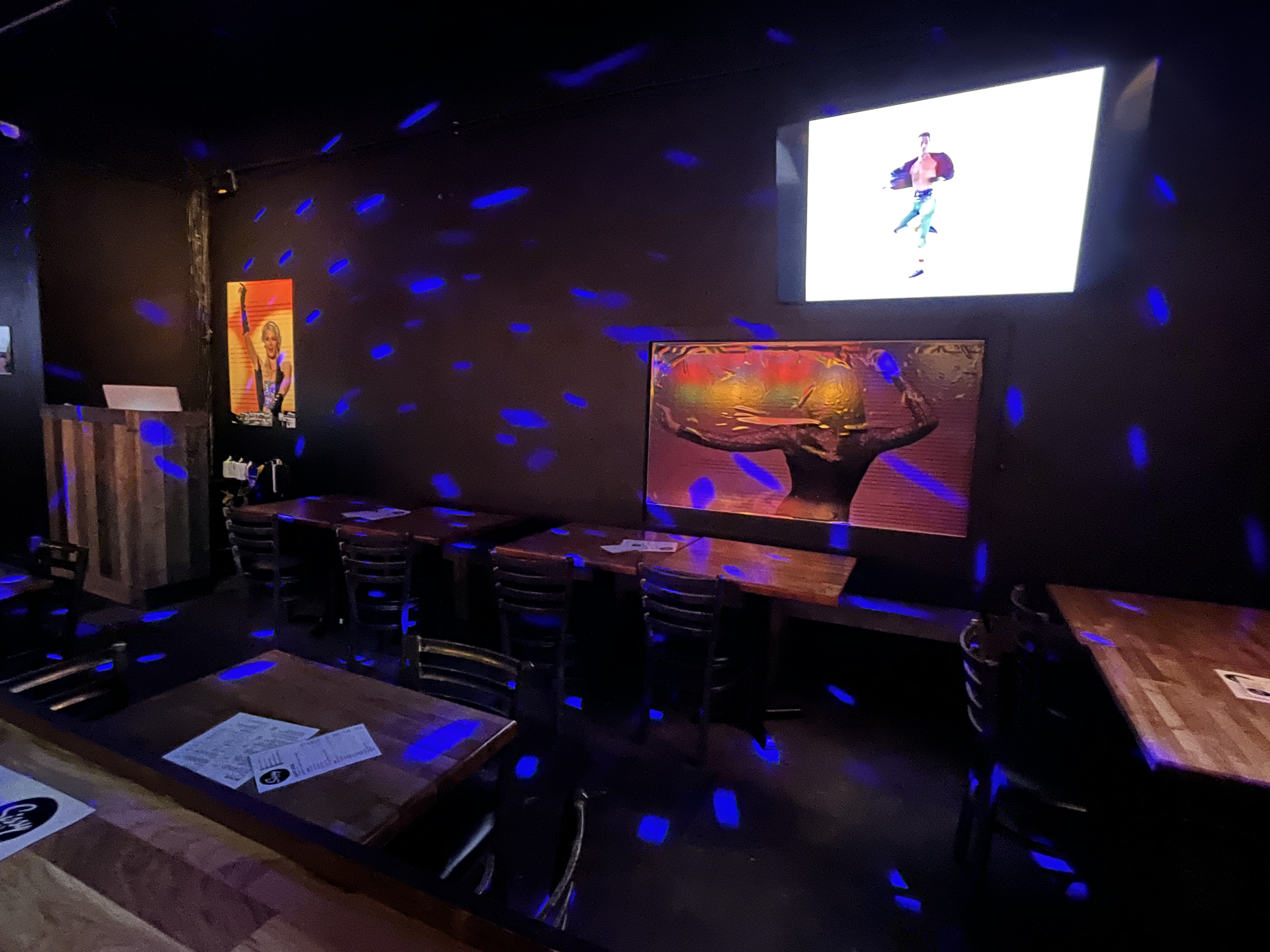
The bar's interior in 2022

In December 2021, Jackson-Glidden described plans for Truman Cox, who previously worked at the Benson Hotel, and Derek Palmer, who previously worked at restaurants Brasserie Montmartre and Raven & Rose, to open Sissy Bar in February 2022. Both owners experienced bullying in their youth and said the bar's name was to reclaim the pejorative slur "sissy". The bar opened in mid-June, shortly after Portland's annual pride parade and festival. Palmer was the bar's owner-operator.

Among events the bar has hosted are Ingenue, a lesbian dance party by DJ Lavender Menace's, and Shape of Drag, described as a "high concept" show by Silhouette. In June 2023, the bar hosted Lacefront, a three-day drag show and charity event showcasing local drag performers, including Imperial Sovereign Rose Court titleholders. Sissy Bar also hosted a show with the drag performer Flawless Shade.

In October 2024, the owners announced plans to close permanently following a Halloween party on October 26, citing the effects of the COVID-19 pandemic. A statement thanked patrons and emphasized the importance of supporting local businesses and the LGBTQ community.

== Reception ==
Andrew Jankowski of Willamette Week said Sissy Bar and Crush were "like sister bars", noting their "Instagrammble entrees" and "fruity" cocktails. He said Sissy Bar's drinks go along with "picturesque, savory" Colombian dishes, which he felt needed additional seasoning. In other articles, the newspaper recommended the Will Smith Punch. In 2023, Thom Hilton said the nachos were the best snack for a group in Willamette Week's "Pride Fuel Guide".

Sissy Bar received the Bar / Business of the Year Award from the Imperial Sovereign Rose Court of Oregon in 2023. Writing for Eater Portland in 2024, Hilton noted that Sissy Bar built a lunchtime customer base, including some locals of Colombian ancestry, and said some residents in the area went for the Colombian cuisine. Rebecca Roland of Eater Portland called the bar's closure "a blow to Portland's queer community" and praised the bar for its community and Colombian food.

== See also ==
- Hispanics and Latinos in Portland, Oregon
