= Flawless Shade =

American drag queen and make-up artist

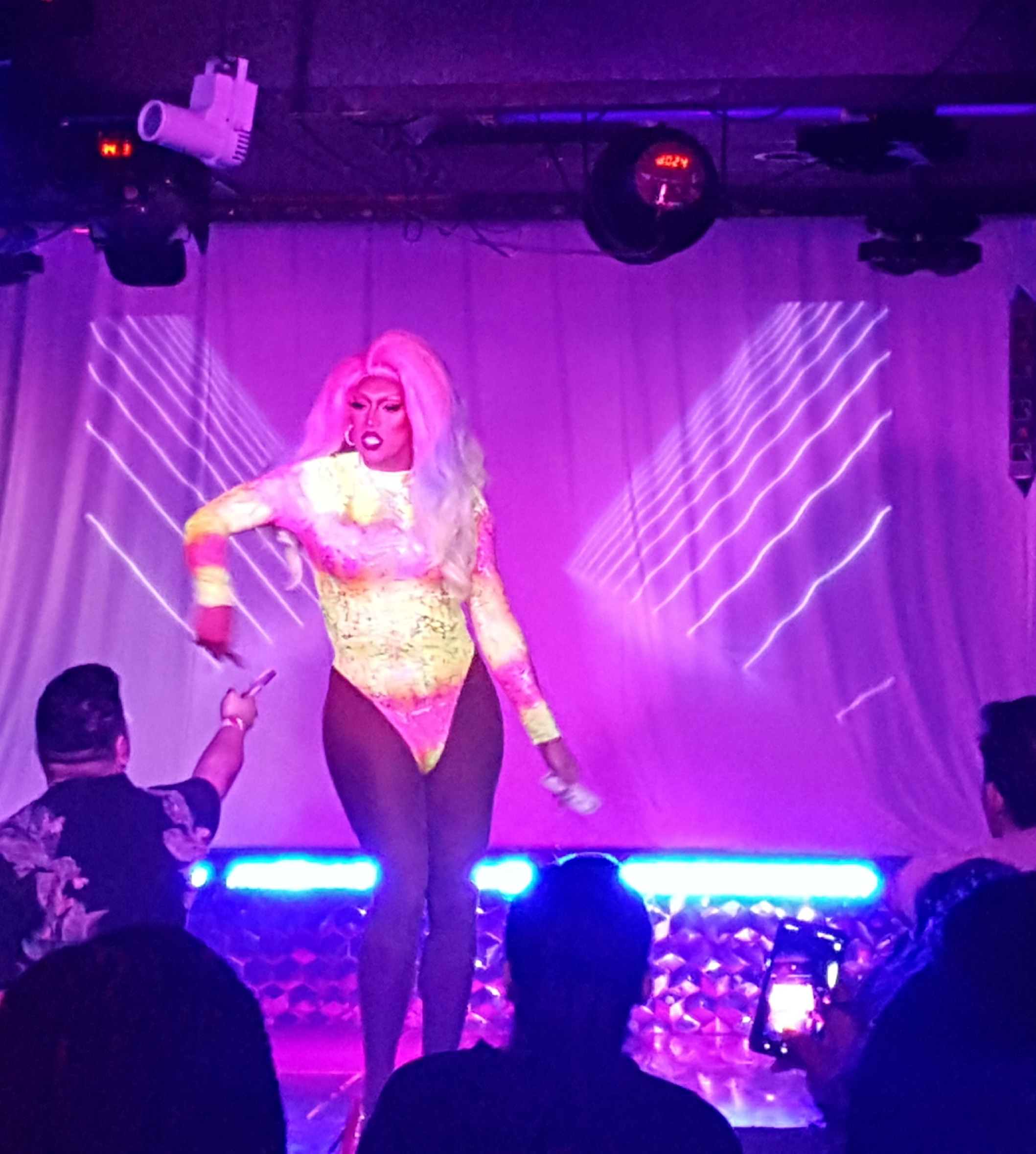
- Flawless Shade performing at CC Slaughters in Portland, Oregon, 2022
- Born: Tajh Jordan
- Other name: Tajh Patterson
- Occupations: Drag queen; make-up artist
- Television: Painted with Raven

Flawless Shade is the stage name of Tajh Jordan (sometimes Tajh Patterson), an American drag performer and make-up artist based in Portland, Oregon. A former Miss Gay Oregon, Flawless Shade has been featured in campaigns by Adidas, GLAAD, and Top Level Design.

Jordan competed under their real name on the subscription-based streaming service WOW Presents Plus's competition series Painted with Raven. They also appeared in and co-produced the music video for "Fear", the lead single on Logic's 2024 album Ultra 85.

== Career ==
Tajh Jordan is a make-up artist based in Portland, Oregon, who performs in drag as Flawless Shade. Jordan began developing the drag persona in 2014. In 2016, Flawless Shade was the first drag competitor in the Stoli Key West Cocktail Classic, an annual bartending contest featuring fifteen LGBTQ bartenders from North America, in which she placed third. As of 2017–2018, at Portland's Century Bar, Flawless Shade hosted a twice-weekly bingo event "Flawless Bingo", which served as a fundraiser for organizations including CAP Northwest (formerly Cascade AIDS Project).

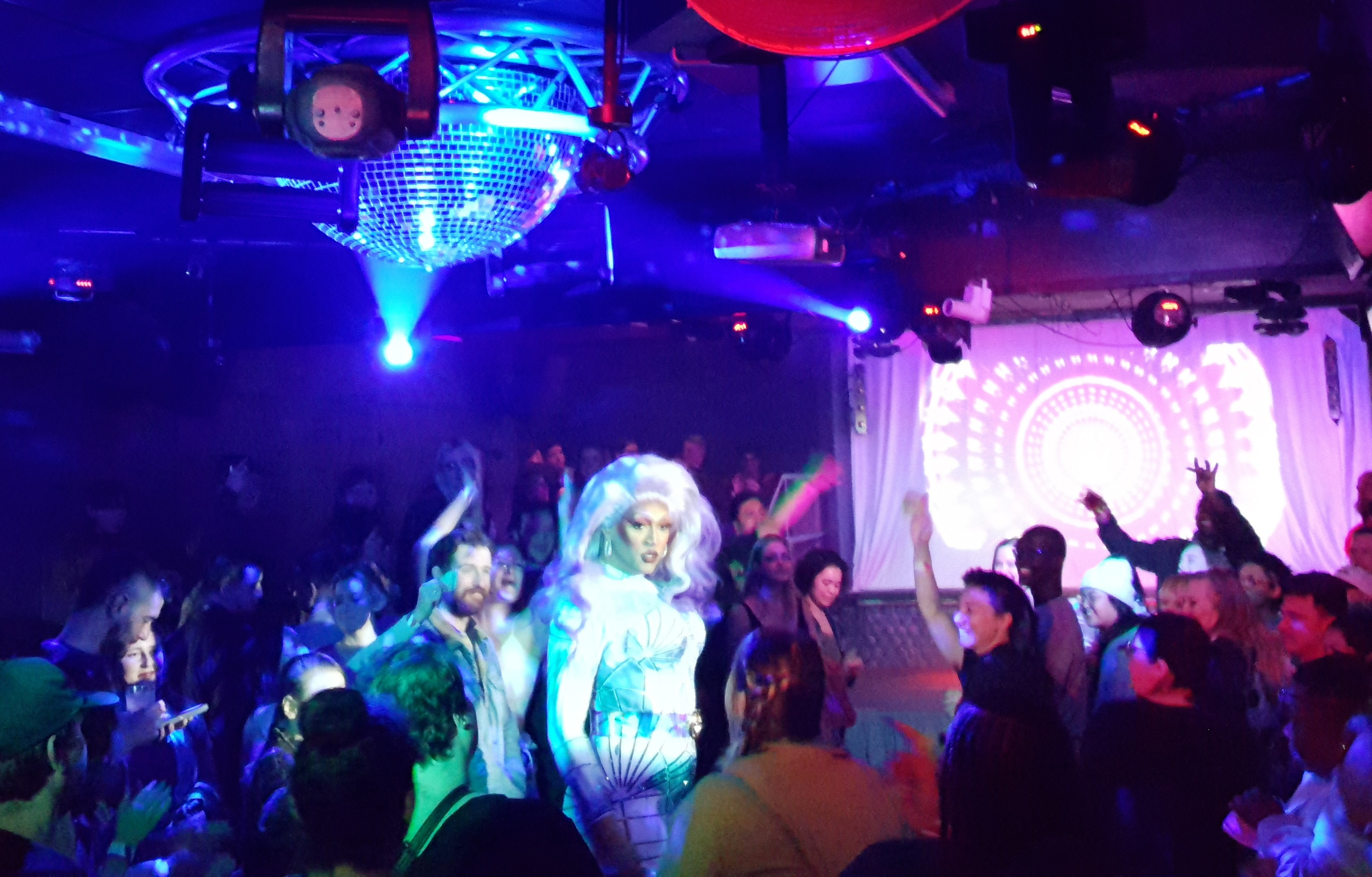
Flawless Shade performing at CC Slaughters, Portland, Oregon, 2022

Flawless Shade hosted drag shows at CC Slaughters, karaoke at Capitol Bar, and trivia at Victoria Bar as of 2019. She also hosted bingo at "Thursgays", a monthly LGBTQ meetup at the arcade-game and pinball venue Quarterworld. She is one of six young queer influencers who featured in Adidas's 2019 gay pride advertising campaign and was named Miss Gay Oregon 2020, one of few Black winners of that pageant title to date. During her reign, Flawless Shade felt discriminated against, resulting in her resignation and reinstatement. According to Andrew Jankowski of Portland Mercury, complaints from her and others prompted the International Sovereign Rose Court "to examine its own inclusivity efforts".

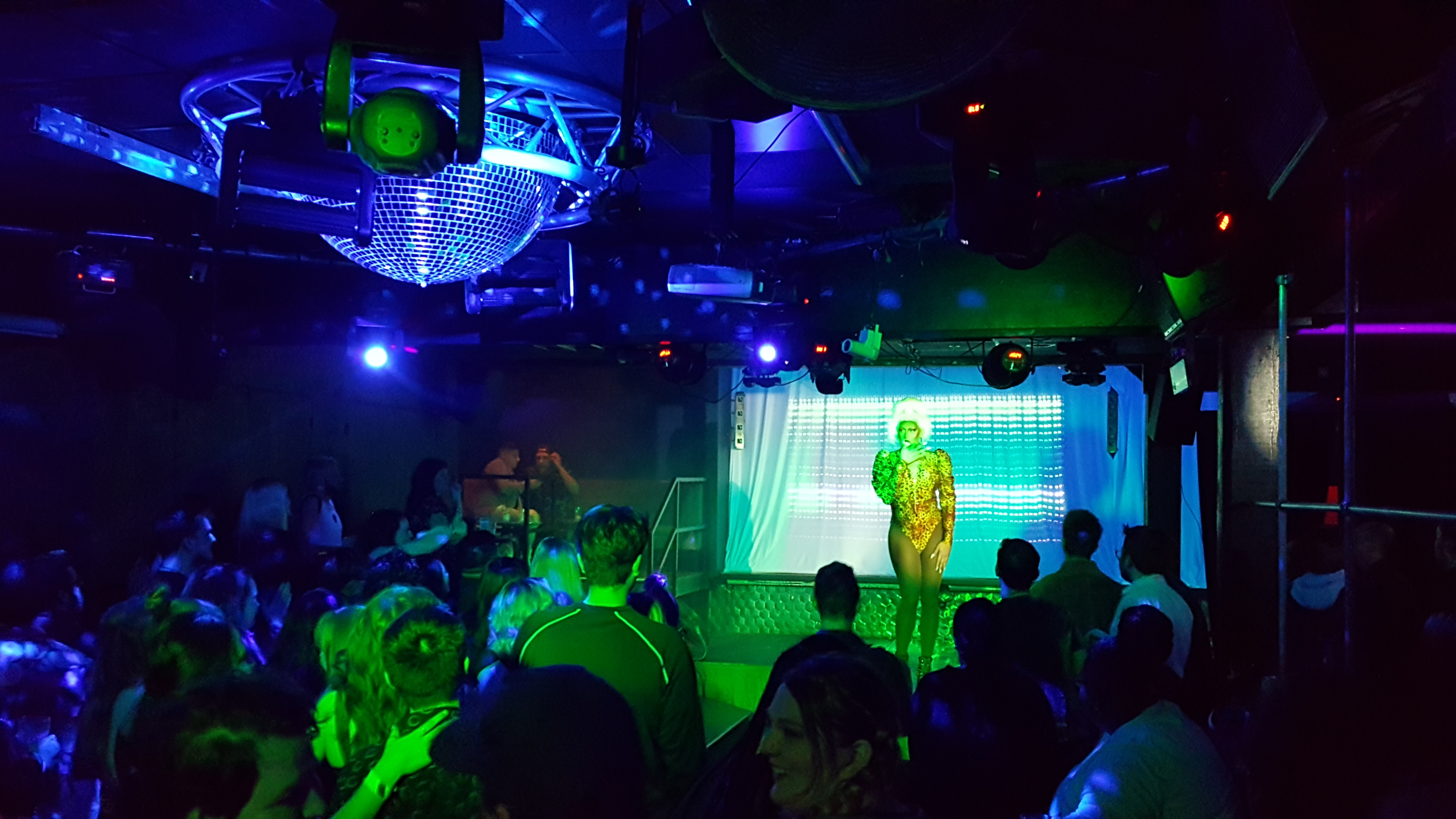
Flawless Shade performing in 2022

In 2020, during the COVID-19 pandemic, Flawless Shade curated the Portland Pride event "Support Your Queer Black Entertainers", a series of video testimonials featuring local Black queer performers that raised $2,000 for the featured entertainers. She also participated in Portland Pride's event "Introvert: Digital Drag Show", which was described as a "night of socially distant drag". Flawless Shade was featured in The Library, a web series featuring queer Portlanders that was presented by Logan Lynn and Top Level Design for the top-level domain name .gay. She represented Oregon in GLAAD's video, which featured drag queens from all 50 states and Washington, D.C., and sought to mobilize voters in the 2020 U.S. presidential election. Flawless Shade hosted and performed at Botanist House's drag show as of 2021. She also co-hosted a tea dance for Portland Pride and performed at Seattle's PrideFest in 2021. She performed at the defunct Sissy Bar in 2023.

Under their real name, Jordan competed on the first season of Painted with Raven, subscription-based streaming service WOW Presents Plus's cosmetics competition series featuring Raven that debuted in late 2021. Jordan was a runner-up, and said they received death threats when the show aired. In 2024, Jordan appeared in and out of drag in the music video for "Fear", the lead single on Logic's studio album Ultra 85. Jordan co-produced the video, the final shot of which shows them "reclining on a chair, staring out a nighttime window after a high-energy show".

== Personal life ==
Jordan is Black and queer. They live in Portland and have described themself as a "Black gay genderfluid person who is a drag queen". In 2017, Jordan called police and filmed a man who was harassing patrons at Scandals, a gay bar in Portland.

As of 2021, Flawless Shade is a member of House of Shade.

== Filmography ==
=== Television ===
- Painted with Raven (season 1; 2021–2022)

=== Film ===
- Paradise Records (2025)

== See also ==
- LGBTQ culture in Portland, Oregon
- List of African-American LGBT people
- List of drag queens
- List of LGBTQ people from Portland, Oregon
