= Painted with Raven season 2 =

Second season of Painted with Raven

Painted with Raven
- Season 2
- Hosted by: Raven
- Judges: Raven
- No. of contestants: 8
- No. of episodes: 8

Release
- Original network: WOW Presents Plus
- Original release: November 17, 2022 – January 5, 2023

Season chronology
- ← Previous; Season 1

The second season of Painted with Raven is set to premiere on November 17, 2022. The cosmetic competition is exclusively available through WOW Presents Plus.

On December 9, 2021, the production company World of Wonder renewed a second season for Painted with Raven. On February 14, 2022, a casting call was open for the second season and ended on March 4. On November 9, 2022, the second season's trailer was revealed with its casting. RuPaul, Randy Barbato, Fenton Bailey, and Tom Campbell, stay as the executive producers for Painted with Raven.

== Contestants ==
Ages, names, and cities stated are at time of filming.

Contestants of Painted with Raven season 2 and their backgrounds
Contestant	Age	Hometown	Outcome
Tucker (Note: Tucker Fancy is referred to as Tucker on the show.)	19	Myrtle Beach, South Carolina	Winner
LaQuan (Note: LaQuan "Q" Anderson is referred to as LaQuan on the show.)	—N/a	Little Rock, Arkansas	Runners-up
Nikki Nik	—N/a	San Francisco, California	Runners-up
Joe (Note: Joseph Louis is referred to as Joe on the show.)	27	New York City, New York	4th place
Lauren (Note: Lauren Ward is referred to as Lauren on the show.)	22	—N/a	5th place
Ariana (Note: Ariana Padro is referred to as Ariana on the show.)	21	New York City, New York	6th place
Elaina (Note: Elaina Glam is referred to as Elaina on the show.)	47	Los Angeles, California	6th place
Luna Rei	—N/a	Greenville, South Carolina	8th place (Note: Luna quit the competition due to mental health issues.)

== Contestants progress ==
Legend:

Tucker won Painted with Raven season 2.
LaQuan and Nikki Nik were the runners-up.
WIN indicates that the contestant won the challenge.
TOP2 indicates that the contestant was one of the two best performing in the challenge.
ADV (Advanced) indicates that the contestant advanced to the finale.
SAFE indicates that the contestant was declared safe by the judges.
BTM (Bottom) indicates that the contestant was up for getting muted.
MUTE indicates that the contestant was muted and would not be participating in the following week's episode.
ELIM (Eliminated) indicates that the contestant was eliminated.
QUIT indicates that Luna Rei quit the competition.
Guest indicates that the contestant returned as a guest.

Contestant	Episode									Total points
Contestant	1	2	3	4	5	6	7		8	Total points
Tucker	WIN; 4 pts.	SAFE; 3 pts.	SAFE; 2 pts.	BTM; 1 pt.	BTM; 1 pt.	TOP2; 5 pts.	SAFE; 2 pts.	ADV	Winner	18
LaQuan	MUTE; 1 pt.		SAFE; 3 pts.	WIN; 4 pts.	MUTE; 1 pt.		WIN; 10 pts.	ADV	Runner-up	19
Nikki Nik	TOP2; 3 pts.	TOP2; 3 pts.	SAFE; 2 pts.	WIN; 5 pts.	SAFE; 2 pts.	BTM; 1 pt.	TOP2; 3 pts.	ADV	Runner-up	19
Joe	SAFE; 2 pts.	BTM; 2 pts.	WIN; 4 pts.	SAFE; 3 pts.	SAFE; 2 pts.	WIN; 4 pts.	BTM; 1 pt.	ELIM	Guest	18
Lauren	SAFE; 2 pts.	SAFE; 3 pts.	TOP2; 3 pts.	TOP2; 3 pts.	SAFE; 2 pts.	SAFE; 2 pts.	SAFE; 2 pts.	ELIM	Guest	17
Ariana	BTM; 1 pt.	TOP2; 3 pts.	BTM; 1 pt.	SAFE; 3 pts.	WIN; 5 pts.	BTM; 1 pt.	BTM; 2 pts.	ELIM	Guest	16
Elaina	SAFE; 3 pts.	WIN; 4 pts.	MUTE; 1 pt.		WIN; 4 pts.	SAFE; 2 pts.	SAFE; 2 pts.	ELIM	Guest	16
Luna Rei	SAFE; 2 pts.	MUTE; 2 pts.		MUTE; 1 pt.	QUIT					5

== Episodes ==
No. overall	No. in season	Title	Original release date
9	1	"Beauty and the Beast"	November 17, 2022
Homework Assignment: Signature WOW Look; Winner of the Assignment: Elaina; Guest Judge: Crimsyn aka Matt (winner of Season 1); Main Challenge: Beauty and the Beast; Winner of the Main Challenge: Tucker; Bottom Two: Ariana and LaQuan; Quick Paint Test: Luscious Overdrawn Lip; Muted: LaQuan
10	2	"Seven Deadly Sins"	November 24, 2022
Homework Assignment: Living Billboard promoting the House of Love Cocktails & Mocktails; Team Colada: Tucker, Luna, Joe and Lauren; Team Ginger Mule: Elaina, Ariana and Nikki: Winner of the Assignment: Lauren; Winning team of the Assignment: Team Colada: Tucker, Luna, Joe and Lauren; Guest Judge: Glen Alen; Main Challenge: 7 Deadly Sins; Pride: Lauren; Greed: Elaina; Lust: Tucker; Envy: Luna; Sloth: Nikki; Gluttony: Joe; Wrath: Ariana; Winner of the Main Challenge: Elaina; Bottom Two: Luna and Joe; Quick Paint Test: Fabulous Fox Eye; Muted: Luna
11	3	"Glam Rock"	December 1, 2022
Homework Assignment: Geometrics; Winner of the Assignment: LaQuan; Guest Judge: Allan Avendano; Main Challenge: Glam Rock; Winner of the Main Challenge: Joe; Bottom Two: Ariana and Elaina; Quick Paint Test: 80s inspired Cheek Contour; Muted: Elaina
12	4	"Celebrity Look-a-like"	December 8, 2022
Homework Assignment: Big Beautiful Brows; Winner of the Assignment: Nikki; Guest Judge: Kristofer Buckle; Main Challenge: Celebrity Looka--like; Winner of the Main Challenge: LaQuan and Nikki; Bottom Two: Luna and Tucker; Quick Paint Test: 2 Tone Gradient Eye; Muted: Luna
13	5	"Doll Face"	December 15, 2022
Homework Assignment: 1930s Hollywood Glamour Look with Black & White; Winner of the Assignment: Ariana; Guest Judge: Preston Meneses; Main Challenge: Doll Face in teams; Ariana & Elaina; Nikki, Lauren & Joe; LaQuan & Tucker; Quit: Luna; Winners of the Main Challenge: Ariana & Elaina; Bottom Two: LaQuan and Tucker; Quick Paint Test: Fierce Fabulous Full Lash using liquid eye-liner; Muted: LaQuan
14	6	"In the Stars"	December 22, 2022
Homework Assignment: Delicious looks using candy; Winner of the Assignment: Tucker; Guest: Joe Romanini; Guest Judge: Patrick Starrr; Main Challenge: In the Stars (Zodiac signs); Aries: Lauren; Taurus: Ariana; Sagittarius: Elaina; Aquarius: Tucker; Gemini: Nikki; Capricorn: Joe; Winner of the Main Challenge: Joe; Bottom Two: Ariana and Nikki; Quick Paint Test: Ombre Lip; Muted: none
15	7	"AILF"	December 29, 2022
Homework Assignment: Liechtenstein painting; Winner of the Assignment: Ariana; Guest Judge: Natasha Marcelina; Main Challenge: Alien I'd like to fuck; Winner of the Main Challenge: LaQuan; Bottom Two: Ariana and Joe; Eliminated: Ariana, Elaina, Joe and Lauren
16	8	"Ascension Ball"	January 5, 2023
Guest Judge: RuPaul; Final Challenge: Ascension Ball: Lower Realm, Earthly Mask and Heavenly Realm; Runners-up: LaQuan and Nikki Nik; Winner: Tucker
