= List of distilleries in Portland, Oregon =

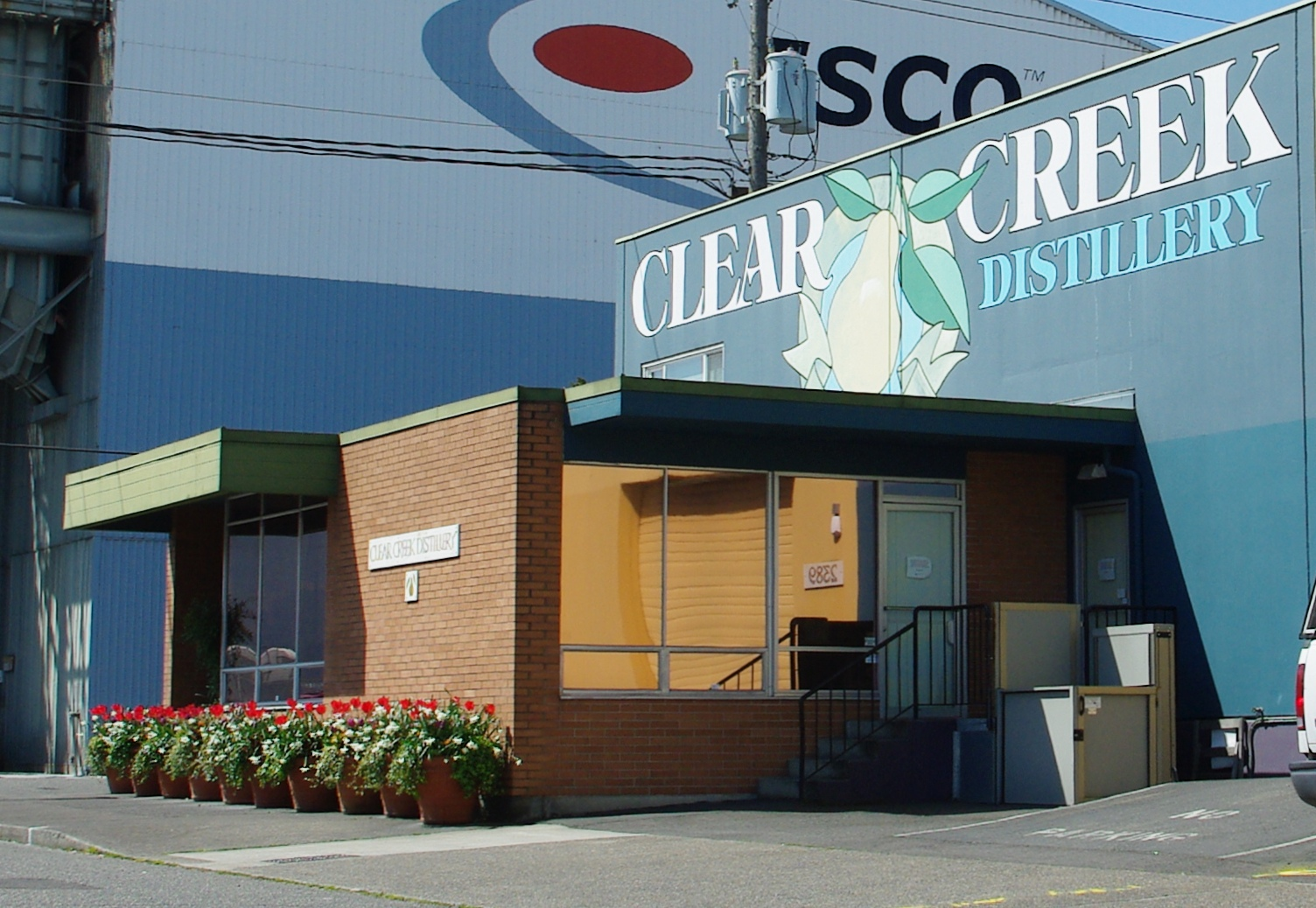
Clear Creek Distillery in Northwest Portland

Portland, Oregon has a burgeoning craft distillery community. Many distilleries in Oregon are producing high end craft spirits. These spirits range from vodka, gin, whiskey, rum, brandy, eau de vie, grappa, and many others. Most distilleries in Oregon are members of the Oregon Distillers Guild, a consortium of craft distilleries in Oregon.

== Distilleries ==
- Clear Creek Distillery
- Eastside Distilling
- Edgefield Distillery
- Freeland Spirits
- House Spirits Distillery
- Kachka Spirits
- McMenamins
- New Deal Distillery
- Rogue Spirits
- Stone Barn Brandyworks

== See also ==
- List of companies based in Oregon
