= Two Wrongs (bar) =

Bar in Portland, Oregon, U.S.

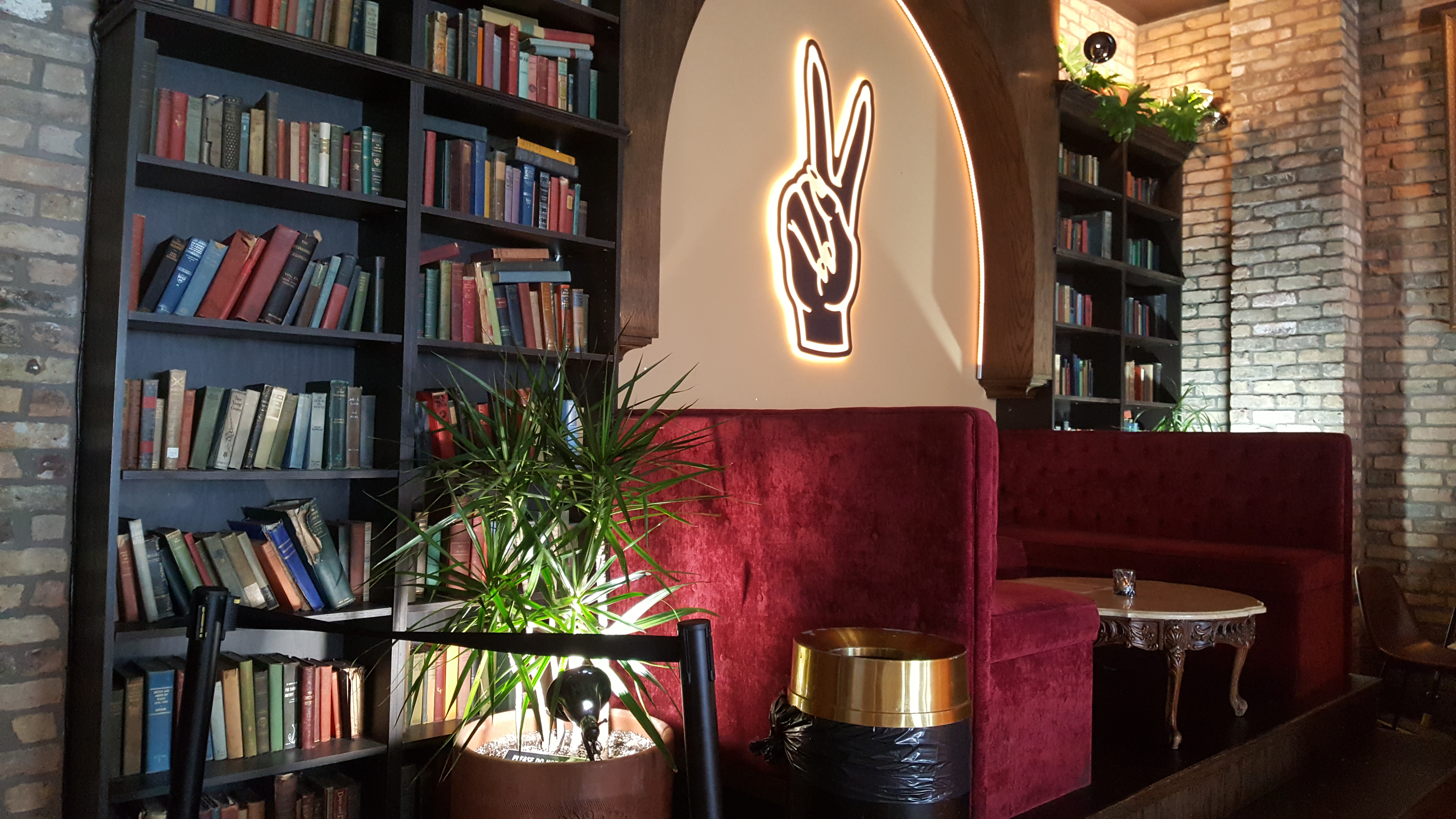
- The bar's interior, 2022
- Interactive map of Two Wrongs

Restaurant information
- Location: 617 Northwest 13th Avenue, Portland, Multnomah, Oregon, 97209, United States
- Coordinates: 45.5275°N 122.6847°W
- Website: twowrongspdx.com

Two Wrongs is a cocktail bar in Portland, Oregon.

== Description and history ==
Two Wrongs is a cocktail bar in northwest Portland's Pearl District. In mid 2019, restaurateur Ramzy Hattar announced plans to open the bar in the former Black Rock Coffee space. Two Wrongs was initially billed as a Moroccan bar with Spanish and Moroccan tiles as well as Moroccan lanterns. When the bar opened in November, Brooke Jackson-Glidden of Eater Portland wrote: "Two Wrongs has transitioned away from its original plan, now serving tricked-out hotdogs and cupcakes, piña coladas, and fun cocktails. Although the Moroccan menu and cocktail influence has been left behind, the space still retains touches of Northern Africa in its aesthetic, from the teardrop-shaped light fixtures picked up in Marrakesh to the eye-catching patterned tile throughout the bar." Two Wrongs used an outdoor dining plaza and covered tents during the COVID-19 pandemic.

In 2021, the team behind Two Wrongs announced plans to launch Jackie's in the space which had occupied Century Bar until the bar closed during the pandemic. Jackies's opened in July 2021.

Two Wrongs is owned by David Hall. The business hired private security, as of 2021.

== Reception ==
In 2020, Alex Frane of Willamette Week opined, "Sure, the menu of mixed drinks includes some high-priced entries, and the beautiful Moroccan-inspired tiling suggests a sophisticated mixology lab. But if you're looking for a mellow place to admire the craftsmanship of your old fashioned, you're likely to be disappointed... That said, Two Wrongs still serves some damn good cocktails—especially for a nightclub."
