= Painted with Raven season 1 =

First season of Painted with Raven

Painted with Raven
- Season 1
- Hosted by: Raven
- No. of contestants: 7
- Winner: Matt
- Runners-up: Tajh; Yvonne
- No. of episodes: 8

Release
- Original network: WOW Presents Plus
- Original release: November 25, 2021 – January 13, 2022

Season chronology
- Next → Season 2

The first season of Painted with Raven premiered on November 25, 2021, and concluded on January 13, 2022. The competition was broadcast on WOW Presents Plus. The competition saw seven makeup artists compete for a cash prize of $25,000.

== Contestants ==
Ages, names, and cities stated are at time of filming.

Contestants of Painted with Raven season 1 and their backgrounds
Contestant	Age	Hometown	Outcome
Matt	25	Leesburg, Virginia	Winner
Tajh	29	Portland, Oregon	Runners-up
Yvonne	—N/a	New York City, New York	Runners-up
Bryce	29	San Francisco, California	4th place
Jamaun	28	Seattle, Washington	5th place
Jordan	26	Salt Lake City, Utah	6th place
Ryan	33	Waldorf, Maryland	7th place

== Contestants progress ==
Legend:

Matt won Painted with Raven season 1.
Tajh and Yvonne were the runners-up.
WIN indicates that the contestant won the challenge.
SAFE indicates that the contestant was declared safe by the judges.
IN indicates that Yvonne lost the first challenge, but won the Wild Card Challenge and got to stay in the competition.
BTM (Bottom) indicates that the contestant was up for getting muted.
MUTE indicates that the contestant was muted and would not be participating in the following week's episode.
ELIM (Eliminated) indicates that the contestant lost both the first and the Wild Card challenges and was eliminated.
Guest indicates that the contestant returned as a guest.

Progress of contestants including rank/position in each episode
Contestant	Episode								Total
Contestant	1	2	3	4	5	6	7	8	Total
Matt	WIN; 3 pts.	SAFE; 2 pts.	SAFE; 2 pts.	WIN; 3 pts.	WIN; 3 pts.	WIN; 3 pts.	WIN x2 pts.	Winner	32
Tajh	WIN; 3 pts.	WIN; 4 pts.	SAFE; 2 pts.	SAFE; 2 pts.	BTM; 1 pt.	BTM; 1 pt.	WIN x2 pts.	Runner-up	26
Yvonne	SAFE; 2 pts.	SAFE; 2 pts.	WIN; 4 pts.	BTM; 1 pt.	WIN; 3 pts.	SAFE; 3 pts.	IN	Runner-up	15
Bryce	WIN; 3 pts.	BTM; 1 pt.	WIN; 3 pts.	WIN; 3 pts.	MUTE; 2 pts.		ELIM	Guest	12
Jamaun	SAFE; 2 pts.	WIN; 3 pts.	BTM; 1 pt.	MUTE; 1 pt.		WIN; 3 pts.	ELIM	Guest	10
Jordan	BTM; 1 pt.	MUTE; 1 pt.		SAFE; 3 pts.	WIN; 3 pts.	BTM; 1 pt.	ELIM	Guest	9
Ryan	MUTE; 1 pt.		MUTE; 1 pt.		SAFE; 2 pts.	SAFE; 2 pts.	ELIM	Guest	6

== Episodes ==
No. overall	No. in season	Title	Original release date	Guest(s)
1	1	"All That Sparkles"	November 25, 2021	RuPaul
Seven amazing makeup artists compete to see who will become the first winner!: Main Challenge: Do a look which is all about sparkles!; Tops of the Week: Bryce, Matt, Tajh; Bottom Two: Ryan and Jordan; Quick Paint Test: The Perfect Smokey Eye; Muted: Ryan
2	2	"Paper Dolls"	December 2, 2021	Raja
Home Assignment: Favorite Holiday Make-up; Winner of the Assignment: Tajh; Main Challenge: Do a look with papers.; Tops of the Week: Jamaun and Tajh; Bottom Two: Bryce and Jordan; Quick Paint Test: Perfect Nose Contour; Muted: Jordan
3	3	"Werk of Art"	December 9, 2021	Preston Meneses
Home Assignment: Face Tattoo; Winner of the Assignment: Yvonne; Main Challenge: Make-up inspired by famous paintings.; Tops of the Week: Bryce and Yvonne; Bottom Two: Jamaun and Ryan; Quick Paint Test: Perfect ombre lip; Muted: Ryan
4	4	"Two Faced"	December 16, 2021	Lipstick Nick
Home Assignment: Transform one part of the face with Iridescent Metallic Makeup; Winner of the Assignment: Jordan; Main Challenge: Two different Make-up on each side of the face.; Tops of the Week: Bryce and Matt; Bottom Two: Jamaun and Yvonne; Quick Paint Test: Bold arch brow; Muted: Jamaun
5	5	"Celebrity Look-alike"	December 23, 2021	Chad Michaels
Home Assignment: Contour with Colors; Winner of the Assignment: Bryce; Main Challenge: Celebrity Look-alike; Tops of the Week: Matt, Yvonne and Jordan; Bottom Two: Bryce and Tajh; Quick Paint Test: Perfect Cut Crease; Muted: Bryce
6	6	"#Twinning"	December 30, 2021	The Kaplan Twins
Home Assignment: Painting an illusion of wearing a mask across their eyes; Winner of the Assignment: Yvonne; Main Challenge: Contestants had to pair up and together to create Identical looks.; Pairs: Yvonne & Ryan, Jamaun & Matt, Jordan & Tajh; Tops of the Week: Jamaun & Matt; Bottom Two: Jordan & Tajh; Quick Paint Test: Perfect Winged Eyeliner; Muted: None
7	7	"Shock It to Me"	January 6, 2022	Naomi Grossman
Main Challenge (Double or Nothing): Create an original monster.; Main Challenge Winner: Matt and Tajh; Wild-Card Challenge: Purple Reign - A purple look.
8	8	"Fairy Tale Ball"	January 13, 2022	RuPaul
Wild-Card Challenge Winner: Yvonne; Eliminated: Bryce, Jamaun, Jordan, Ryan; Final Challenge: Create three looks for the Fairy Tale Ball: The Damsel/Dude in Distress, The Villain, and The Hero/Heroine.; Runners-up: Tajh and Yvonne; Winner: Matt
