= Botanist House =

Cocktail bar and restaurant in Portland, Oregon, U.S.

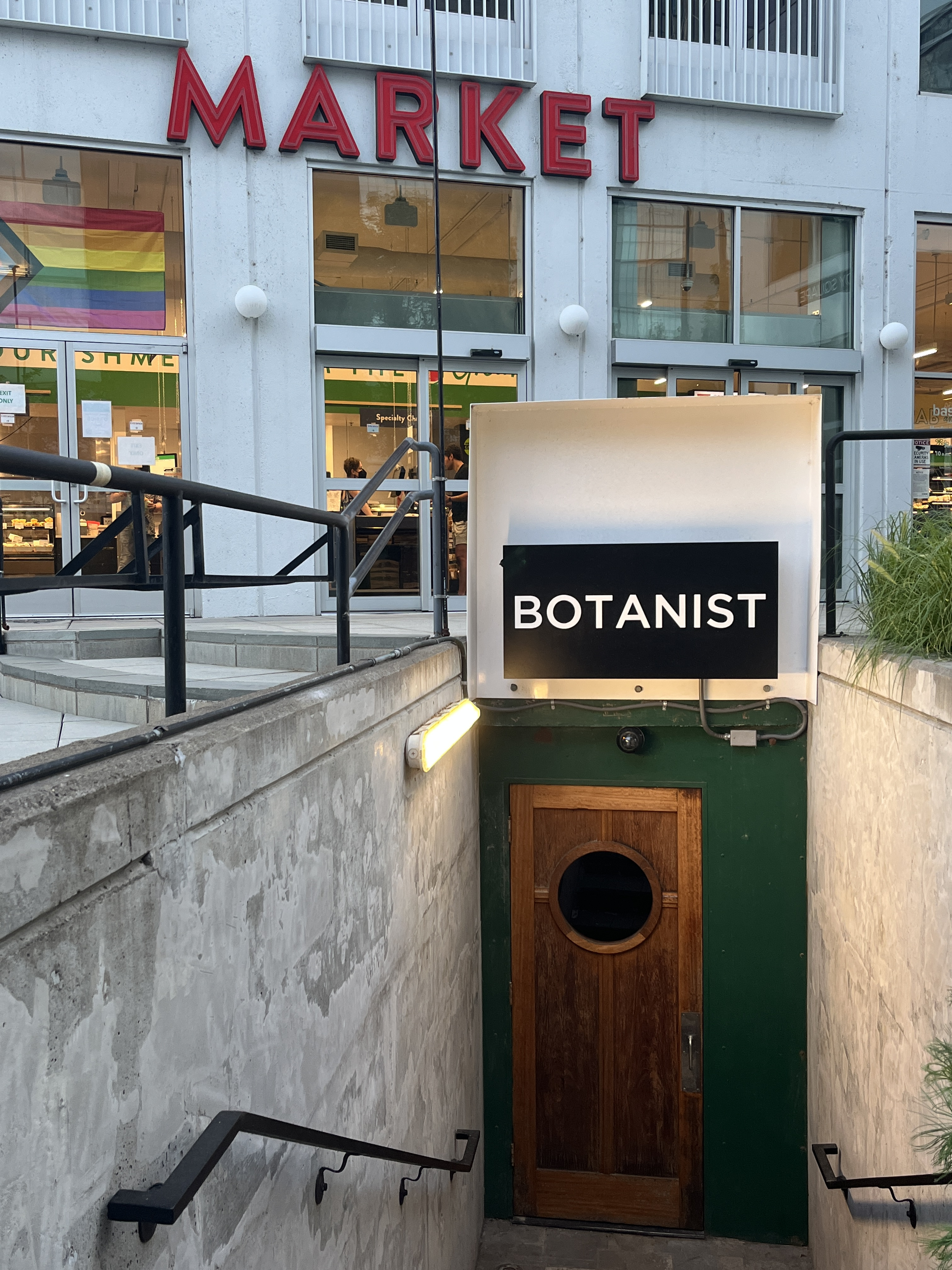
- Entrance, 2022
- Interactive map of Botanist House

Restaurant information
- Established: November 2018
- Closed: 2021
- Owners: Matt Davidson; Robbie Wilson
- Location: Portland, Multnomah, Oregon, United States
- Coordinates: 45.52962°N 122.68513°W

Botanist House, or simply Botanist, was a cocktail bar and restaurant in the Pearl District of Portland in the U.S. state of Oregon. The business opened in 2018 and closed in 2021.

== Description ==
Botanist was located at the intersection of Lovejoy and 13th Avenue in northwest Portland's Pearl District, in a space previously occupied by Pink Rose and below an Office Depot store. Matt Davidson and Robbie Wilson are co-owners. Botanist's menu was mostly gin- and seafood-driven upon opening. Eater Portland's Brooke Jackson-Glidden said of the interior: "The bar itself ... is all bright greens and pseudo-’20s vibes, with jazz on the playlist and an old-school backlit bar. A large vintage cocktail poster dominates the main bar space, next to a tiny, 25-ish seat dining room lined with vintage liquor bottles and posters of botanicals."

== History ==
Botanist opened in November 2018.

During the COVID-19 pandemic, the bar started a meal assistance program; by April 2020, the business had distributed 6,200 meals. Derek Boaz was executive chef at the time. The bar also partnered with Meals on Wheels and the winery Stoller to assist hospitality and restaurant workers, as well as seniors.

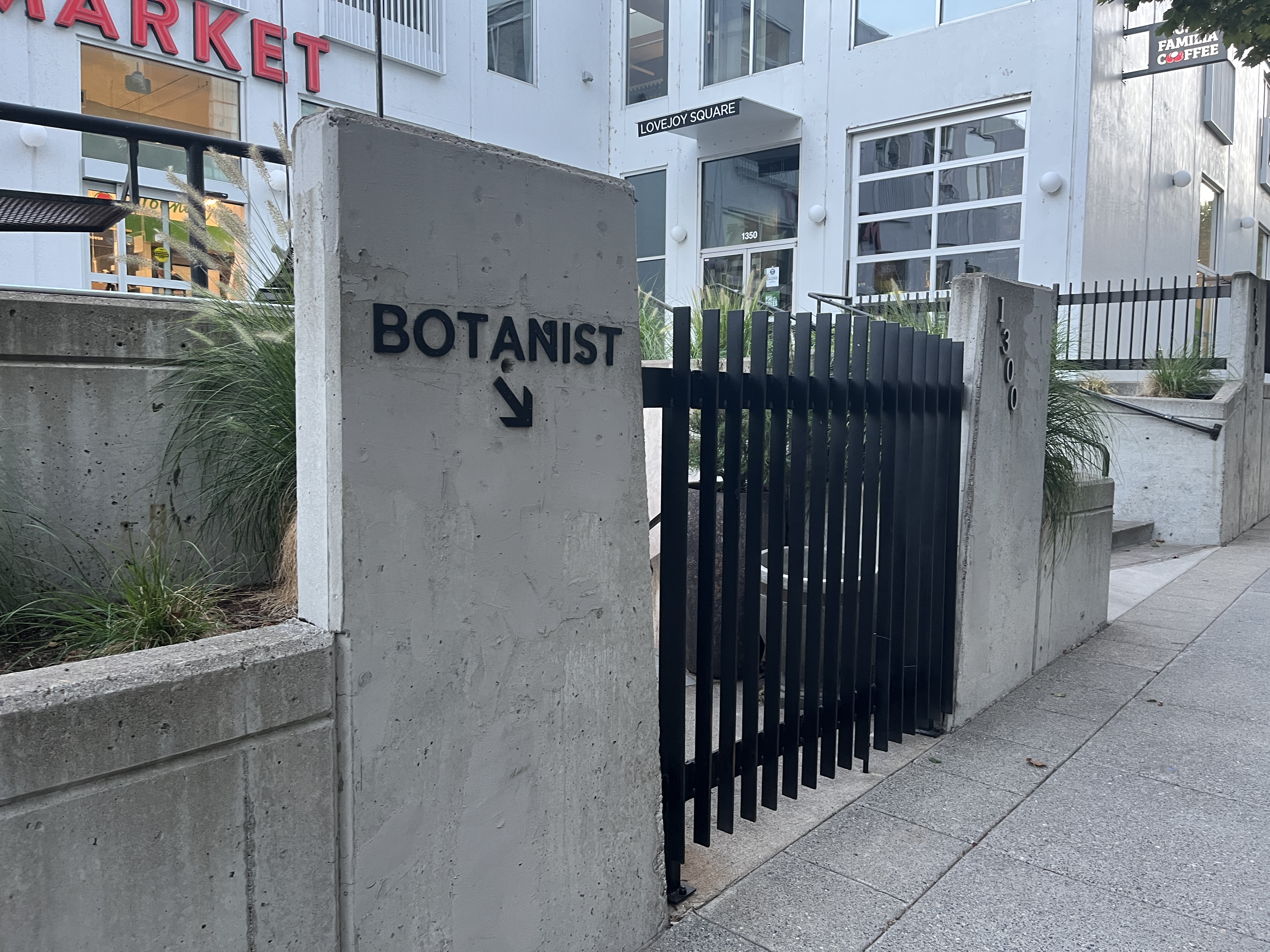
Entrance sign, 2022

Botanist operated from a nearby rooftop patio previously occupied by On Deck Sports Bar. A Change.org petition organized by Botanist seeking to allow takeout cocktail service received more than 1,600 signatures. In November 2020, Botanist confirmed plans to start takeout cocktail service in violation of state law; owners called the act a "Civil Disobedience Protest". The act of defiance was canceled after the Oregon Liquor Control Commission began considering rule changes. The bar received some noise complaints after hosting live music. Takeout cocktail service continued through at least March 2021. In April, Botanist partnered with Rose City Drag for the bar to host Flawless Shade's drag series Climax.

Botanist closed in 2021, during the pandemic.

== Reception ==
Botanist was nominated in the bar of the year category for Eater Portland's 2018 Eater Awards.
