= House Spirits Distillery =

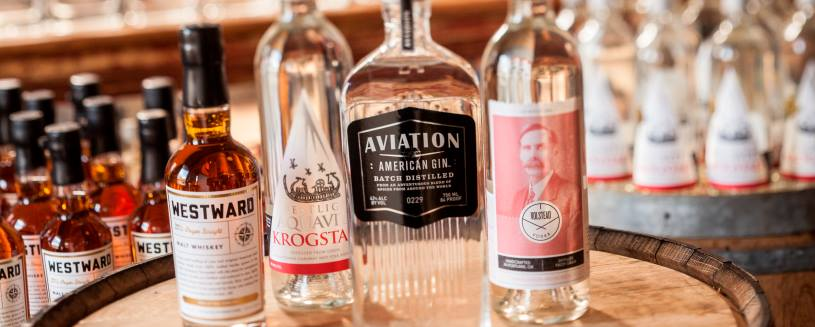
Group shot of House Spirits Distillery spirits

House Spirits Distillery is an American craft distiller based in Portland, Oregon. It was founded in Corvallis in 2004 and moved to Portland in 2005. Its production facility and tasting room is located on Portland's Distillery Row, in the Central Eastside Industrial District. The distillery's flagship brand is Aviation American Gin, which comprised 80% of its production in 2012, and around 40% in 2016, after the company's move into a larger distillery facilitated a major expansion of production of its whiskey brand.

Production of Westward Oregon Straight Malt Whiskey, made from malted barley grown in the Pacific Northwest, accounted for around 50% of the company's production in late 2016. Other products include Krogstad Festlig aquavit and Volstead Vodka. Small-batch artisanal liqueurs from House Spirits have included Japanese-style shōchū and coffee liqueur.

In 2013, the company made plans to expand its distribution to 35 states in a deal with distributor Southern Wine & Spirits. The same year, House Spirits opened a second tasting room at Portland International Airport. Former NFL quarterback Joe Montana is an investor in the company.

In November 2015, House Spirits opened a new, larger distillery in Portland's Central Eastside Industrial District. The $6 million, 14,000-square-foot (1,300 m^{2}) facility, built almost entirely new, also included a tasting room. At the time, House said the expansion would enable them to double their production of American Aviation Gin and increase their production of Westward Whiskey tenfold.

In late 2016, the company sold American Aviation Gin to New York-based supplier Davos Brands, but the company continues to be the gin's sole distiller.

On April 6, 2025, House Spirits Distillery filed for Chapter 11 bankruptcy protection, citing financial challenges and a decline in alcohol sales after the COVID-19 pandemic, leading to overcapacity and unsold inventory. In October 2025, House Spirits Distillery sold all of its assets to a group of private investors for an undisclosed amount.

== See also ==
- List of distilleries in Portland, Oregon
