= Crush Bar =

Gay bar and restaurant in Portland, Oregon, U.S.

- Logo

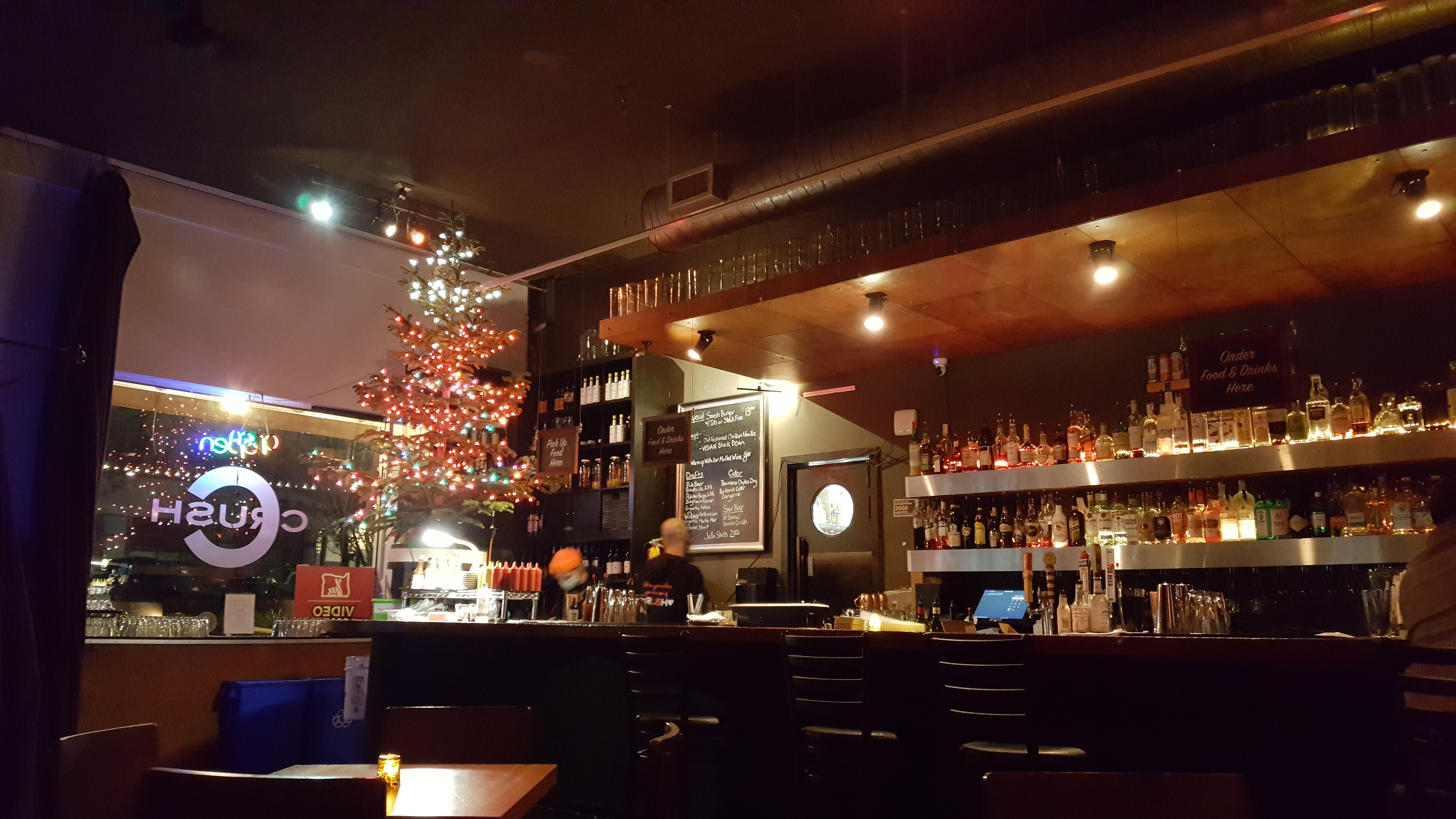
- The bar's interior, 2021

- Location within Portland, Oregon
- Address: 1400 Southeast Morrison Street
- Location: Portland, Oregon, United States
- Coordinates: 45.51711°N 122.65144°W
- Owner: John "Woody" Clarke
- Type: Gay bar; restaurant

Construction
- Opened: 2001
- Closed: January 1, 2025

Website
- crushbar.com

Crush Bar (sometimes simply Crush) was a gay bar and restaurant in Portland, Oregon's Buckman neighborhood, in the United States. Established in 2001, the bar was scheduled to permanently close at the end of 2023, until an employee's investment kept Crush open into 2024. The bar closed permanently on January 1, 2025.

== Description ==
Crush Bar was a gay bar in southeast Portland's Buckman neighborhood. Willamette Week's Lizzy Acker described Crush as "a welcoming neighborhood gay bar for everyone". She wrote, "if you can't find something you like, either sidled up to the bar chatting up the bartenders, in the back watching a burlesque show, playing video poker off to the side, or outside on the sidewalk smoking cigarettes and making new friends, well, that's on you... Crush is not populated by cool girls and boys, staring at their phones trying to impress everyone with their boredom. If you want that, your options are endless. But if you're looking for a place to dance till you're naked or sing along with strangers, this is your spot." The newspaper's Aaron Spencer described the bar's atmosphere as "loungey, with bottle art and mood lighting, but unpretentious.

Crush's logo featured images of two men holding hands, a woman and a man holding hands, as well as two women holding hands. The bar had unisex public toilets. In his 2019 "overview of Portland's LGBTQ+ nightlife for the newcomer", Andrew Jankowski of the Portland Mercury wrote: "Crush is among Portland’s coziest, most queer-friendly bars, and is presently Southeast Portland’s only LGBTQ+ bar. Crush offers a foodie-friendly menu, crafted cocktails, sidewalk patio, burlesque-drag revues, stand-up comedy shows, nonbinary concerts, and pants-free dance parties."

== History ==
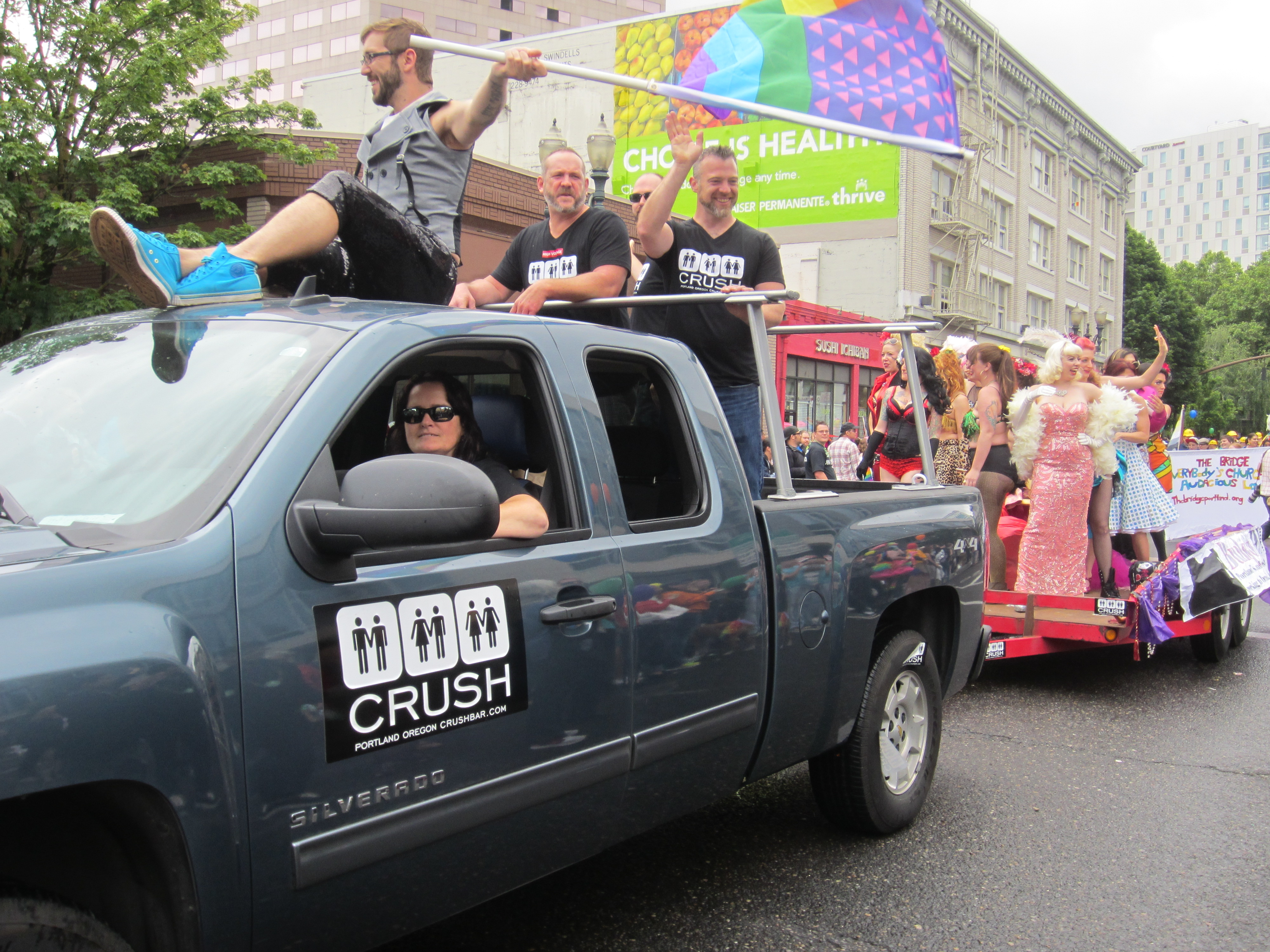
Crush Bar representation at Portland Pride, 2014

Crush Bar was established in 2001. The bar was owned by John "Woody" Clarke. It hosted the monthly event Bi Bar in 2014.

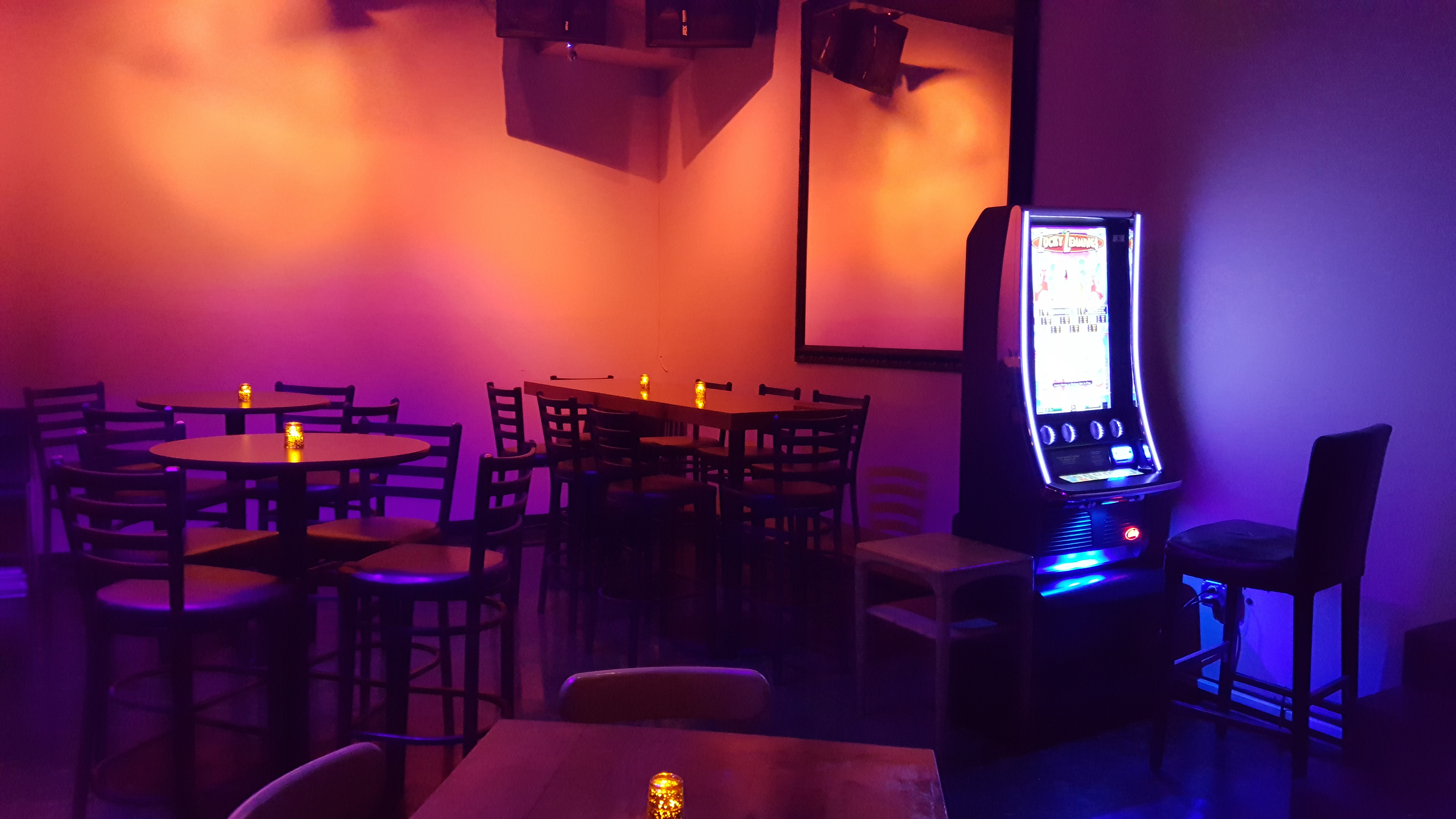
The bar's interior in 2021, during the COVID-19 pandemic

On March 17, 2020, Crush Bar was forced to close due to the Oregon Governor's mandate for the COVID-19 pandemic. Clarke terminated all 27 employees and refused to pay out any form of compensation. The bar's union, Crush Bar Workers Collective (CBWC), staged a sit-in to demand compensation for "accrued sick time pay off, half-time pay for our scheduled hours one week out, and guarantee rehires when the bar reopens". The owner denied these requests and contacted law enforcement to have the union members removed. Two days later the owner backtracked their claim and agreed to compensate the employees for their sick leave.

Crush Bar was scheduled to close at the end of 2023. However, an employee's investment in the bar kept Crush opened into 2024, with Clarke no longer overseeing business operations. In December 2024, the business announced plans to close permanently at the end of the year. Following New Year's Eve, Crush Bar closed on January 1, 2025. The bar Peacock is slated to open in the space that previously housed Crush Bar in 2025.

== Reception ==
Crush was recognized multiple times by Willamette Week's annual readers' poll. The bar was named "Best LGBT Bar" in 2015, and "Best LGBT Bar" and runner-up in the "Best Drag Show" category in 2016. Crush was named the city's best bar in 2017, and "Best LGBTQ Bar" and runner-up in the "Best Happy Hour" category in 2018. Crush Bar won in the "Best LGBTQ Bar" category in 2020. Michael Russell included Crush Bar in The Oregonian's list of the 21 "most painful" restaurant and bar closures of 2024.
