= Aviation American Gin =

Brand of gin

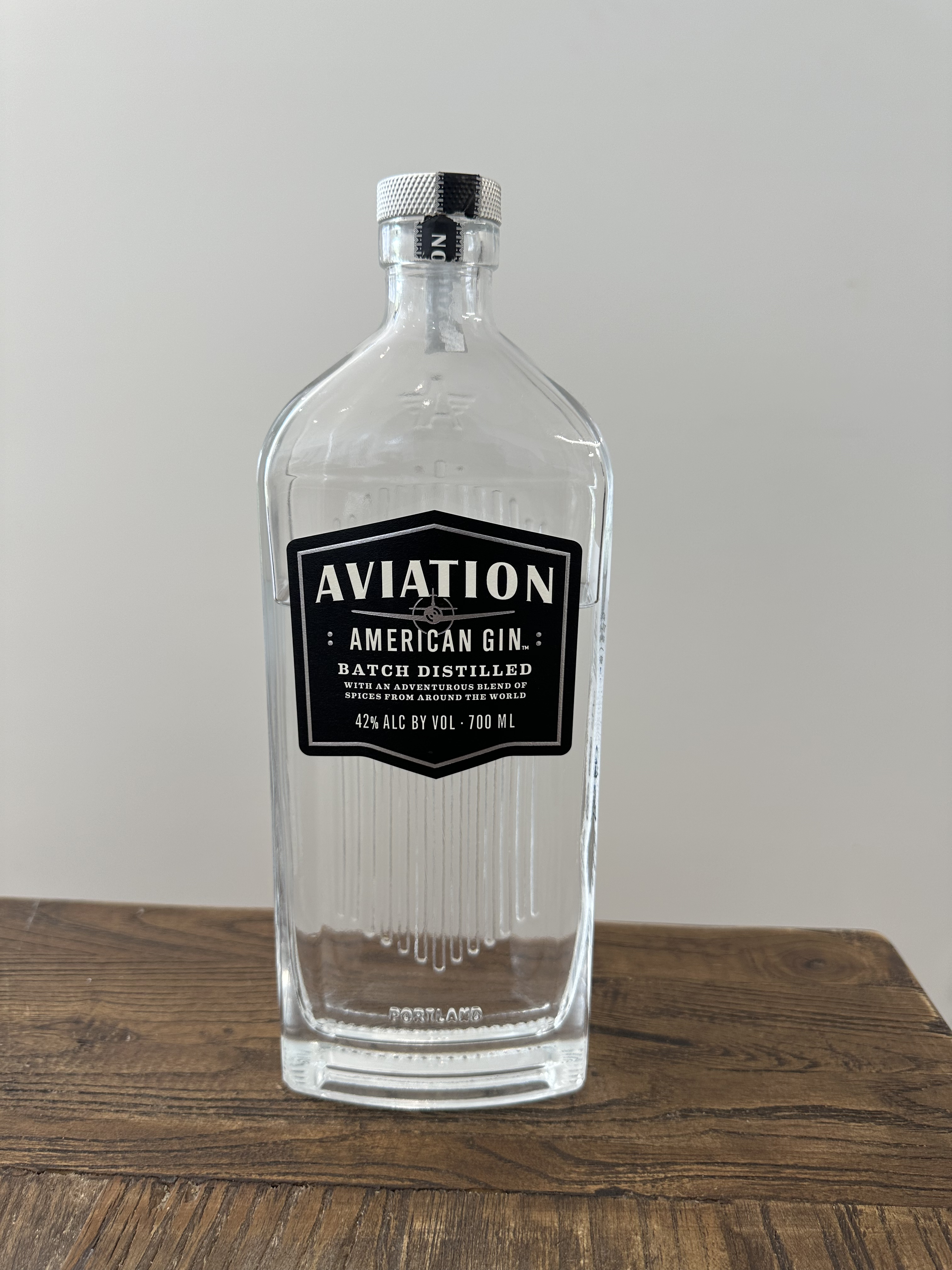
- Type: Gin
- Manufacturer: Diageo
- Origin: Portland, Oregon, United States
- Introduced: 2006
- Proof (US): 84
- Website: www.aviationgin.com

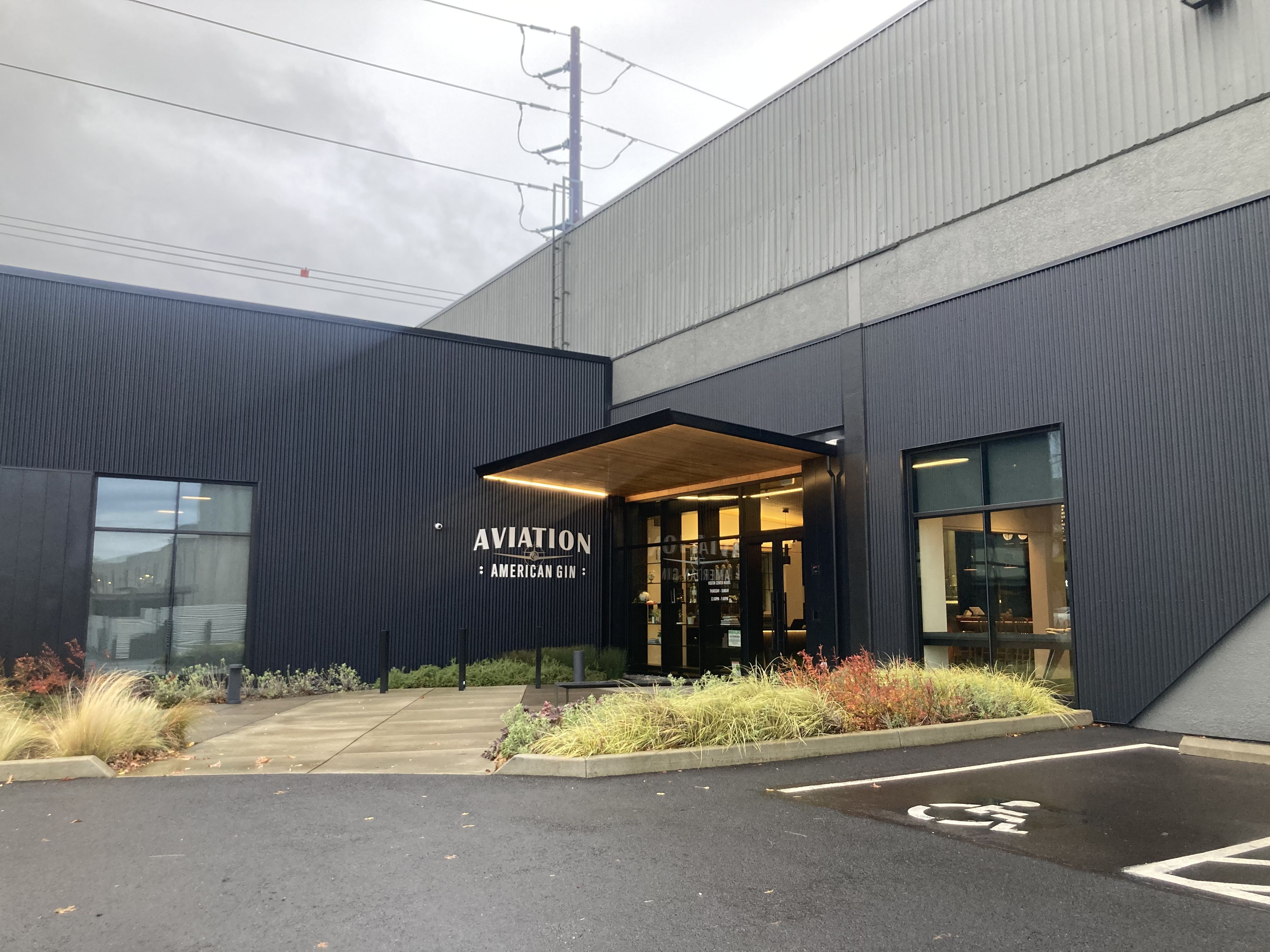
Exterior of Aviation American Gin Distillery and Visitor Center

Aviation American Gin, also known as Aviation Gin, is a brand of gin first produced in Portland, Oregon, by founders Christian Krogstad and Ryan Magarian in 2006. It is owned by the British-based multinational alcoholic beverage maker Diageo.

It is produced by House Spirits Distillery. It is distributed nationwide in the United States and 15 other countries, including Canada, Spain, the UK, Ireland, France, Russia, Italy, Germany, the Netherlands, and Australia. Originally, it was bottled in a wine bottle with a blue label. The newer bottle, introduced in 2013, looks like a flask and is reminiscent of the Art Deco period, with a black label and a silver cap. In 2018, the company and label were bought by Canadian-American actor Ryan Reynolds, who became its new owner and primary spokesman and sponsor.

== History ==
House Spirits Distillery sold the Aviation American Gin brand to New York-based distributor Davos Brands, LLC, in 2016, but as of early 2018, it continues to be distilled in Portland by House Spirits. As of late 2016, Aviation Gin accounted for around 40 percent of House Spirits' production.

Actor Ryan Reynolds acquired a stake in the brand from Davos in February 2018. On August 17, 2020, Aviation was sold to Diageo for up to $610 million, whose liquor lineup includes the gin Tanqueray, as well as Smirnoff vodka, and Johnnie Walker Scotch whisky. Reynolds still maintains an "ongoing ownership interest" in Aviation.

== Distillation ==
Seven flavoring ingredients are used in its production: juniper, lavender, sweet and bitter orange peel, cardamom, coriander, Indian sarsaparilla, and anise seed, which are steeped in grain spirit for 18 hours, then re-distilled in a custom-built, 400-gallon pot still. Off the still, Aviation is about 140 U.S. proof, and deionized Cascade mountain water brings it down to 84 proof before bottling.

== Promotion ==
In a 2018 sketch promoting the gin, Ryan Reynold's fake twin brother, Gordon Reynolds, compared the taste of Aviation American Gin to "like a sunrise had sex with a feather duster".

Reynolds promotes the gin in various films he stars in, including Red Notice and Deadpool 2. Reynolds also promoted the gin in the football club that he owns, Wrexham A.F.C., with Aviation signing a sleeve and training kit sponsorship deal with the club.

== Awards and reviews ==
Wine Enthusiast magazine awarded Aviation American Gin a 97-point rating in 2012, the highest rating the magazine has given to any gin.

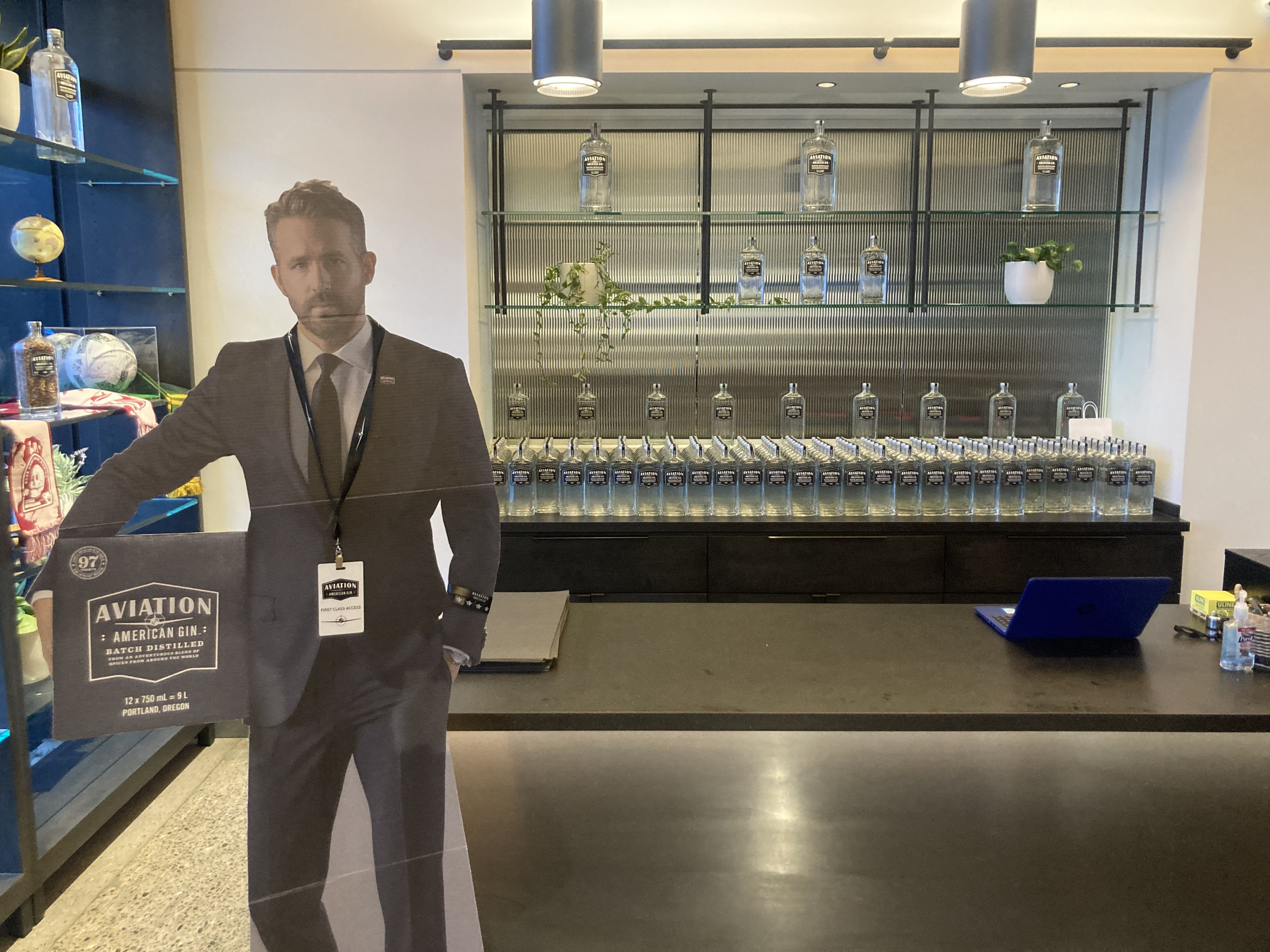
Welcome desk at distillery, with cutout of Ryan Reynolds

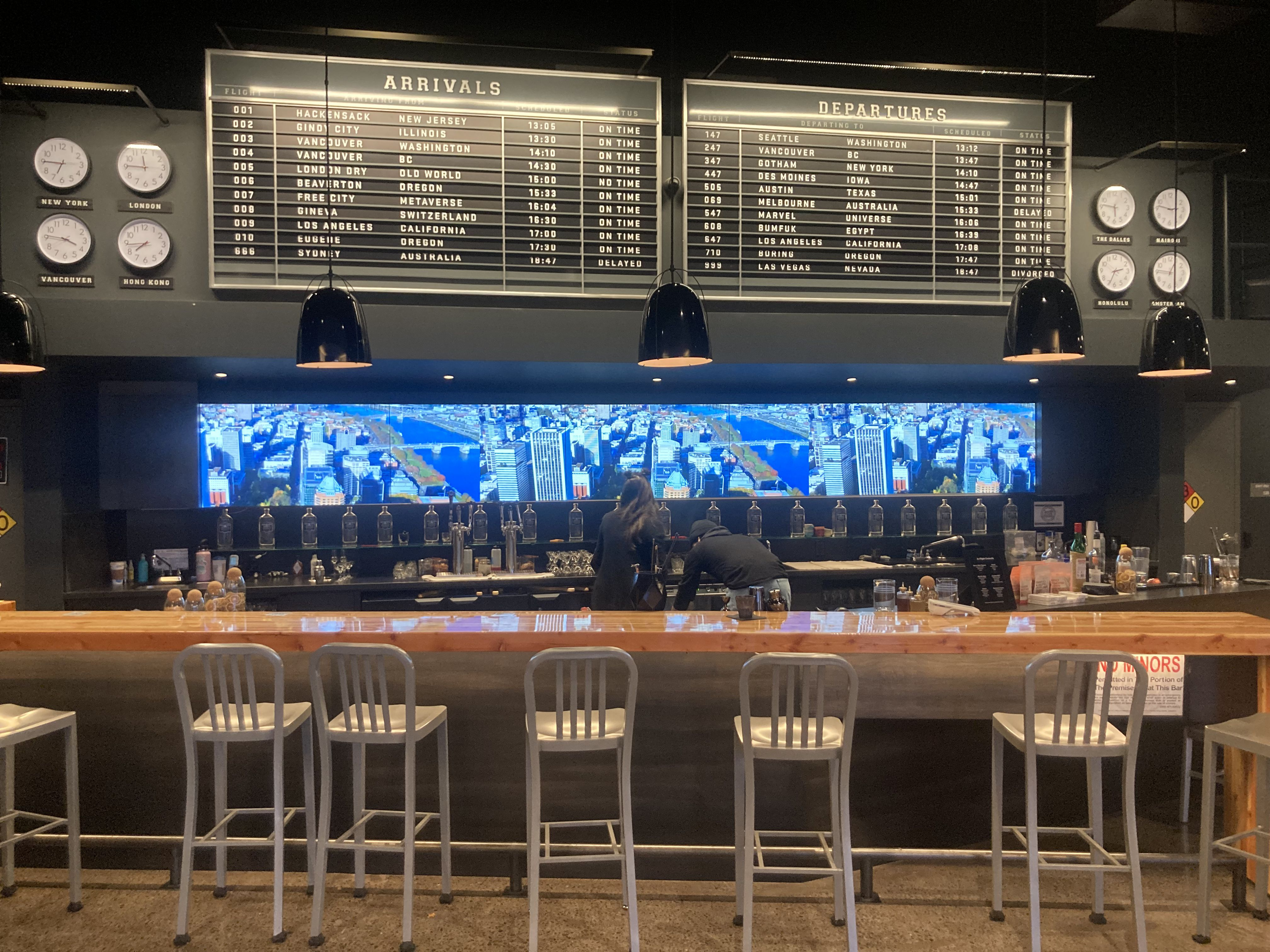
Bar at distillery

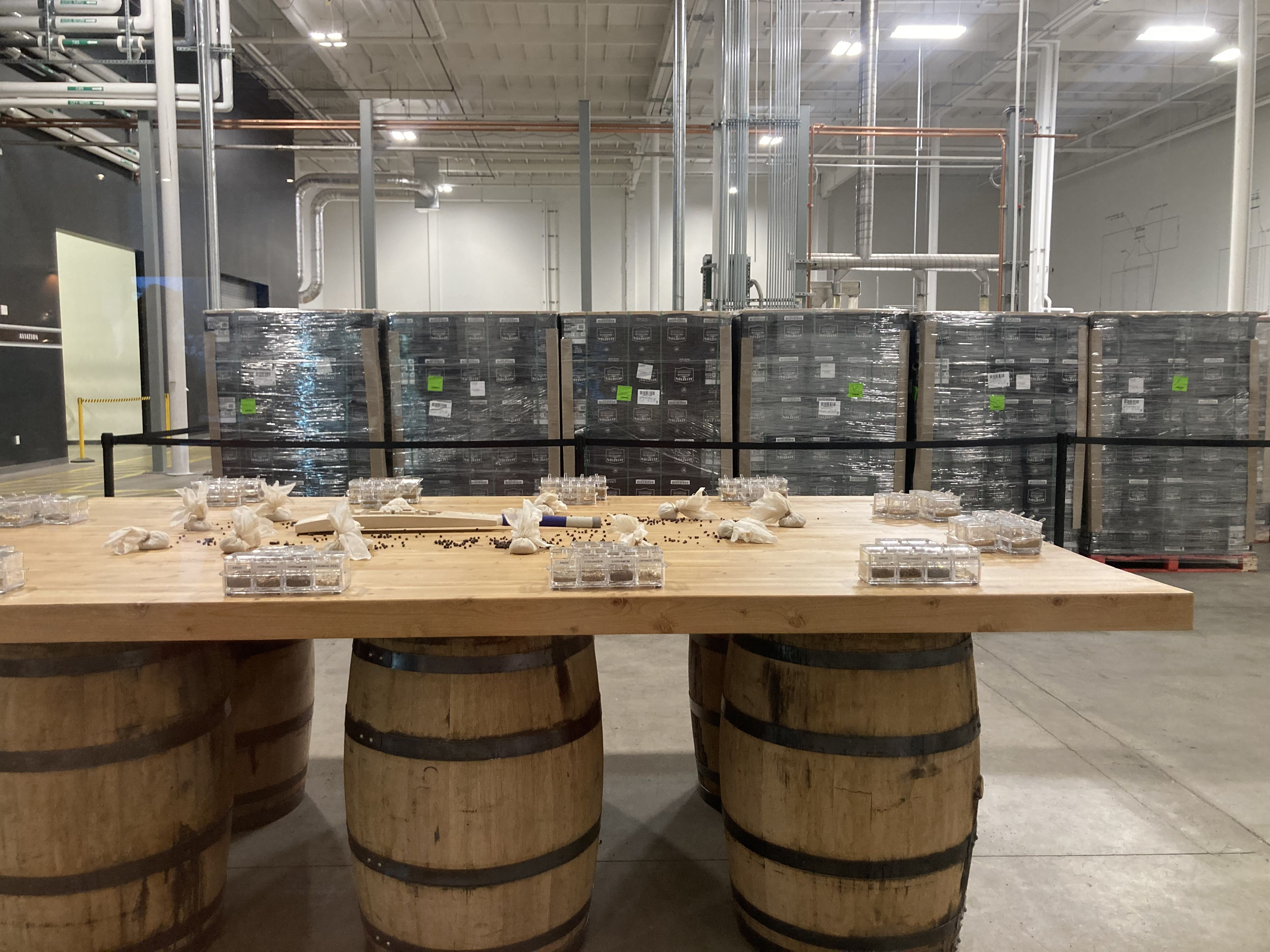
Aromatics sampling space for tour

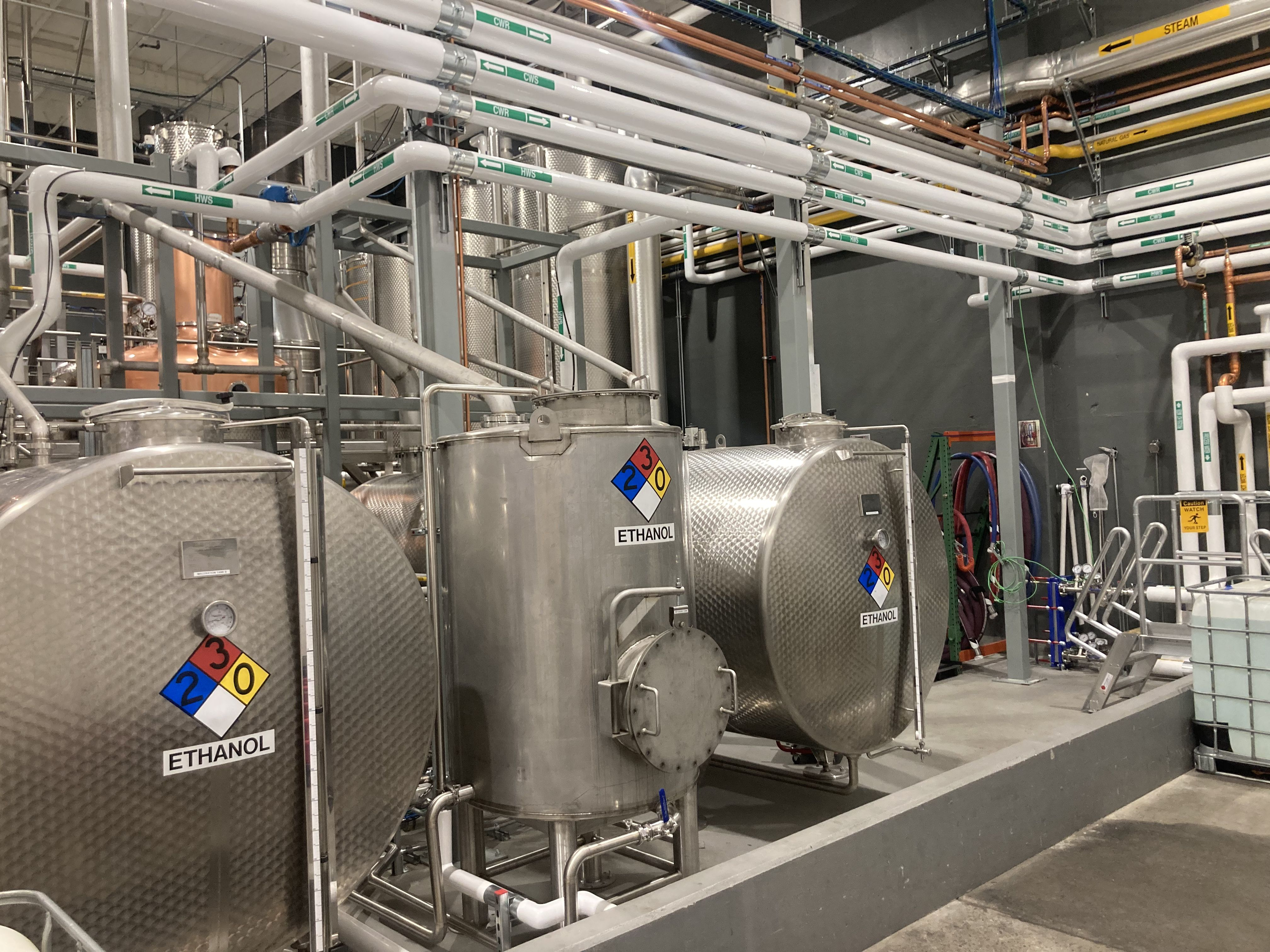
Production stills

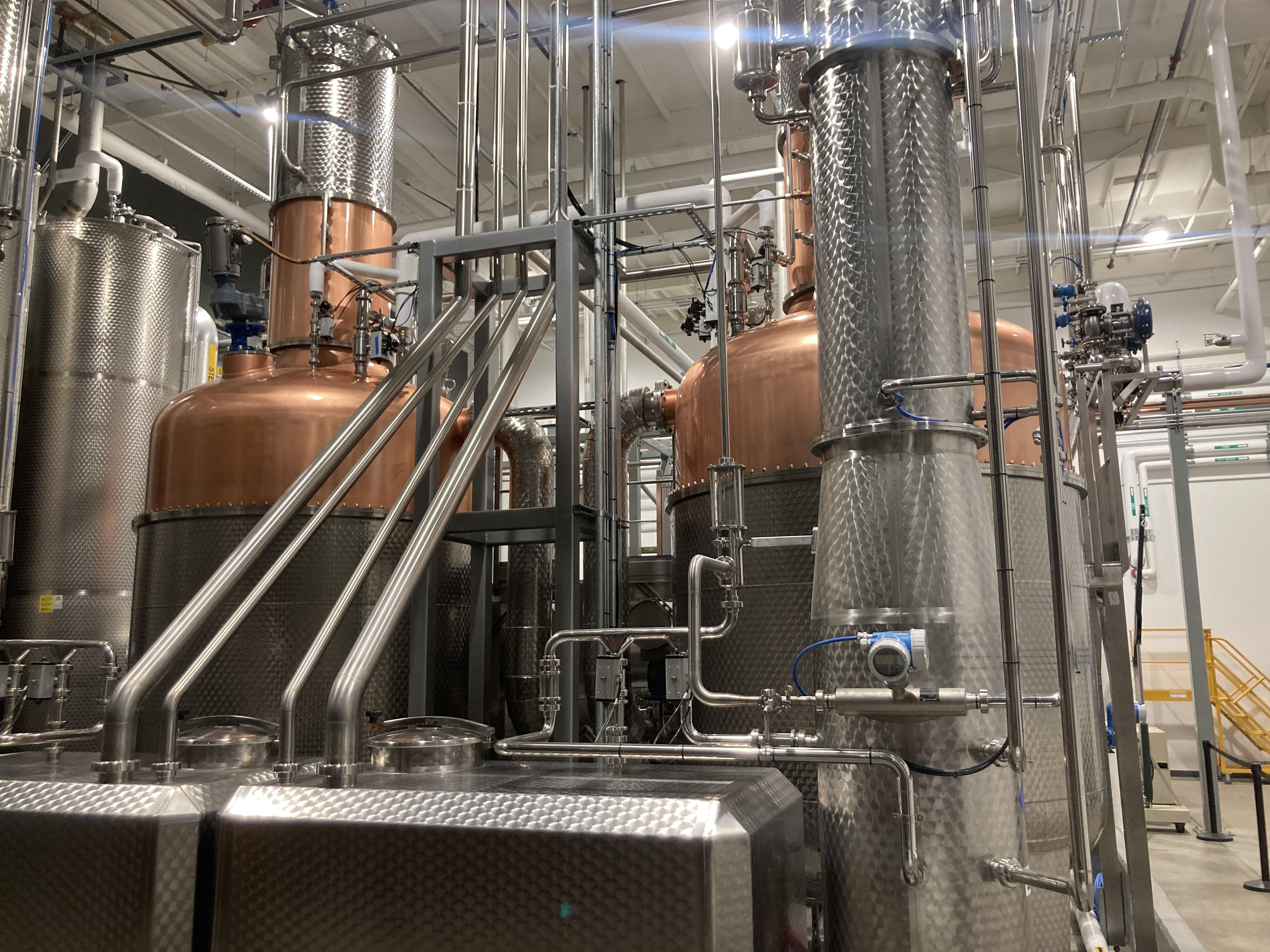
Production stills

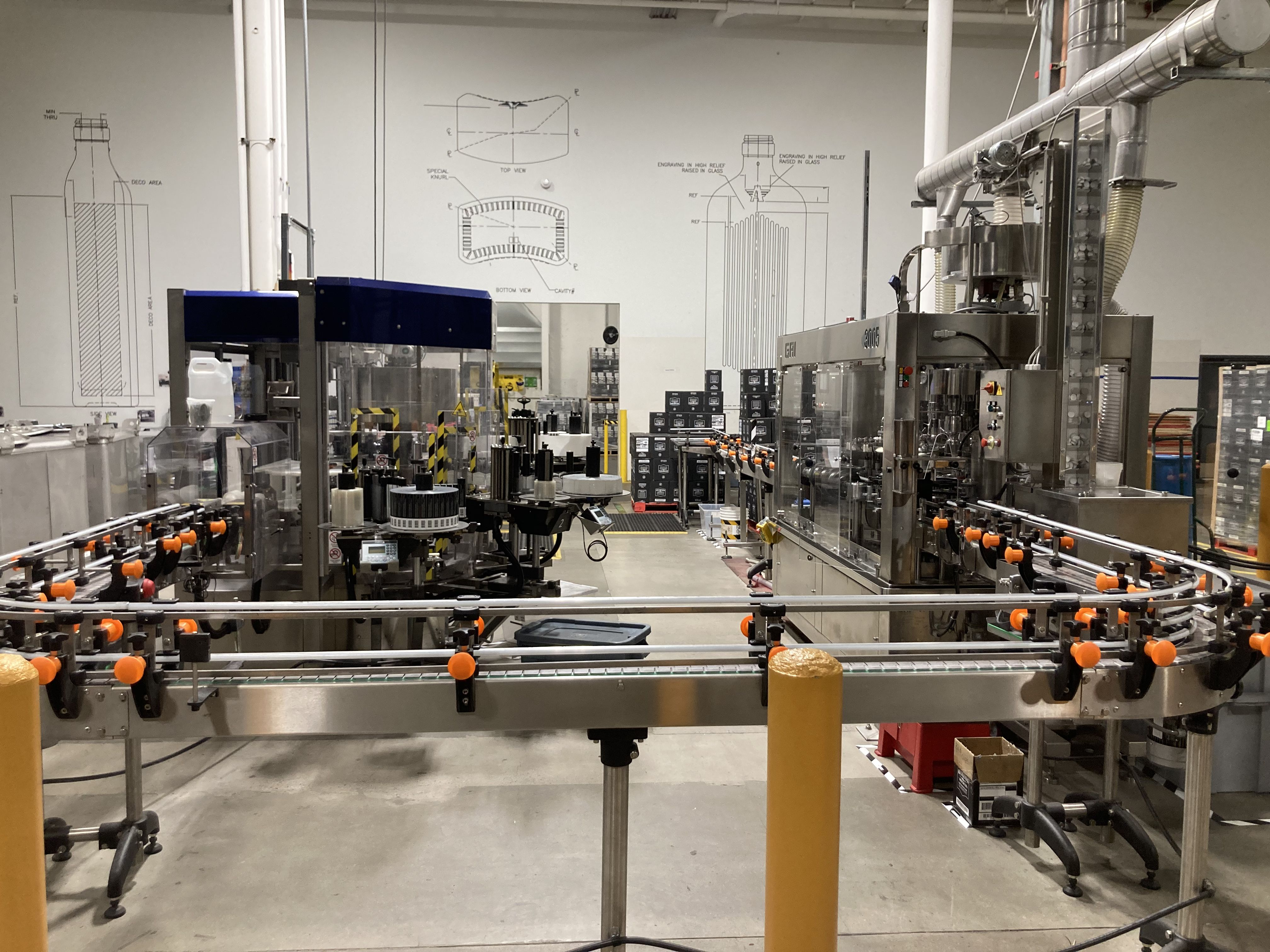
Filling line

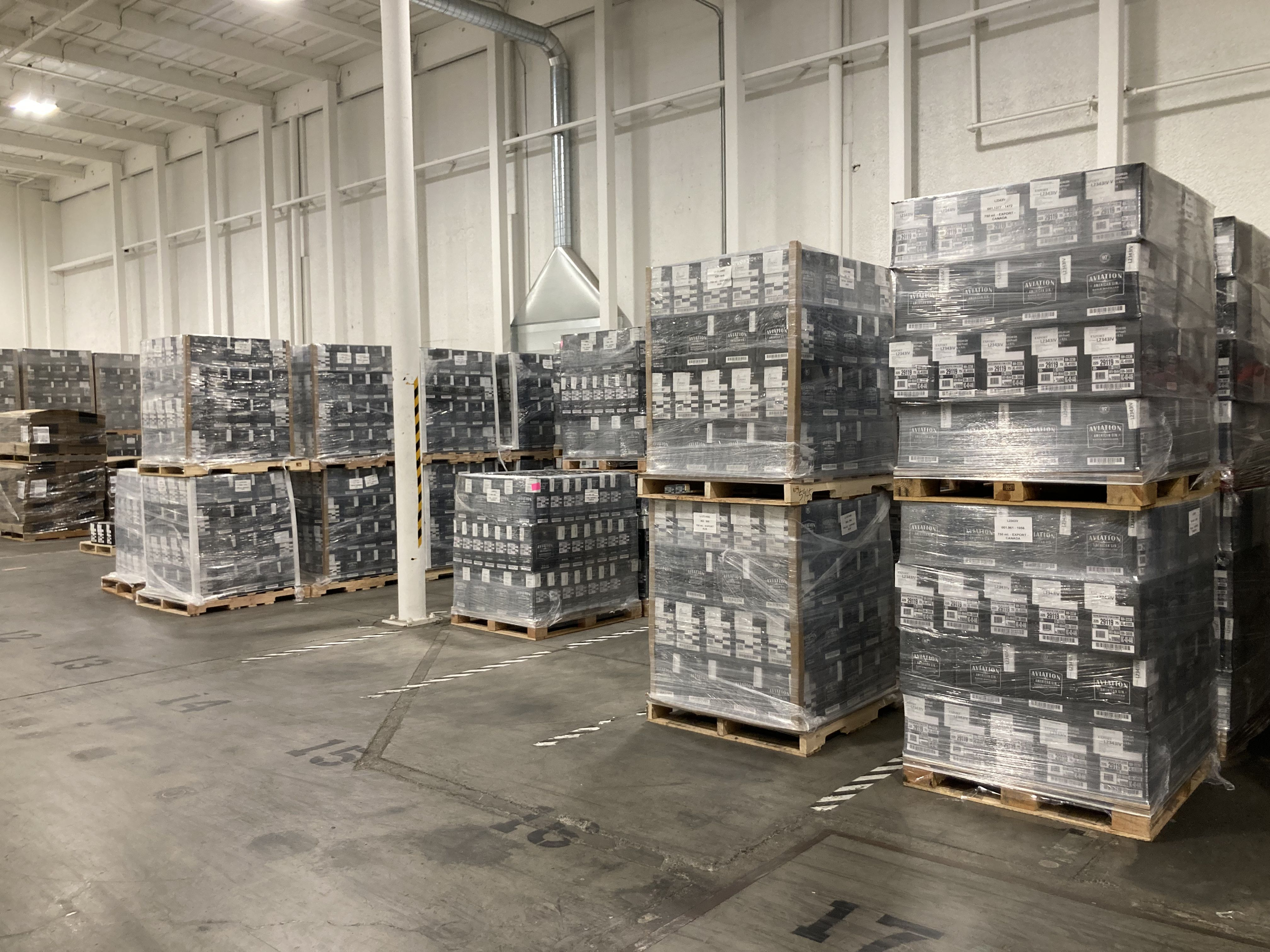
Gin in storage at warehouse

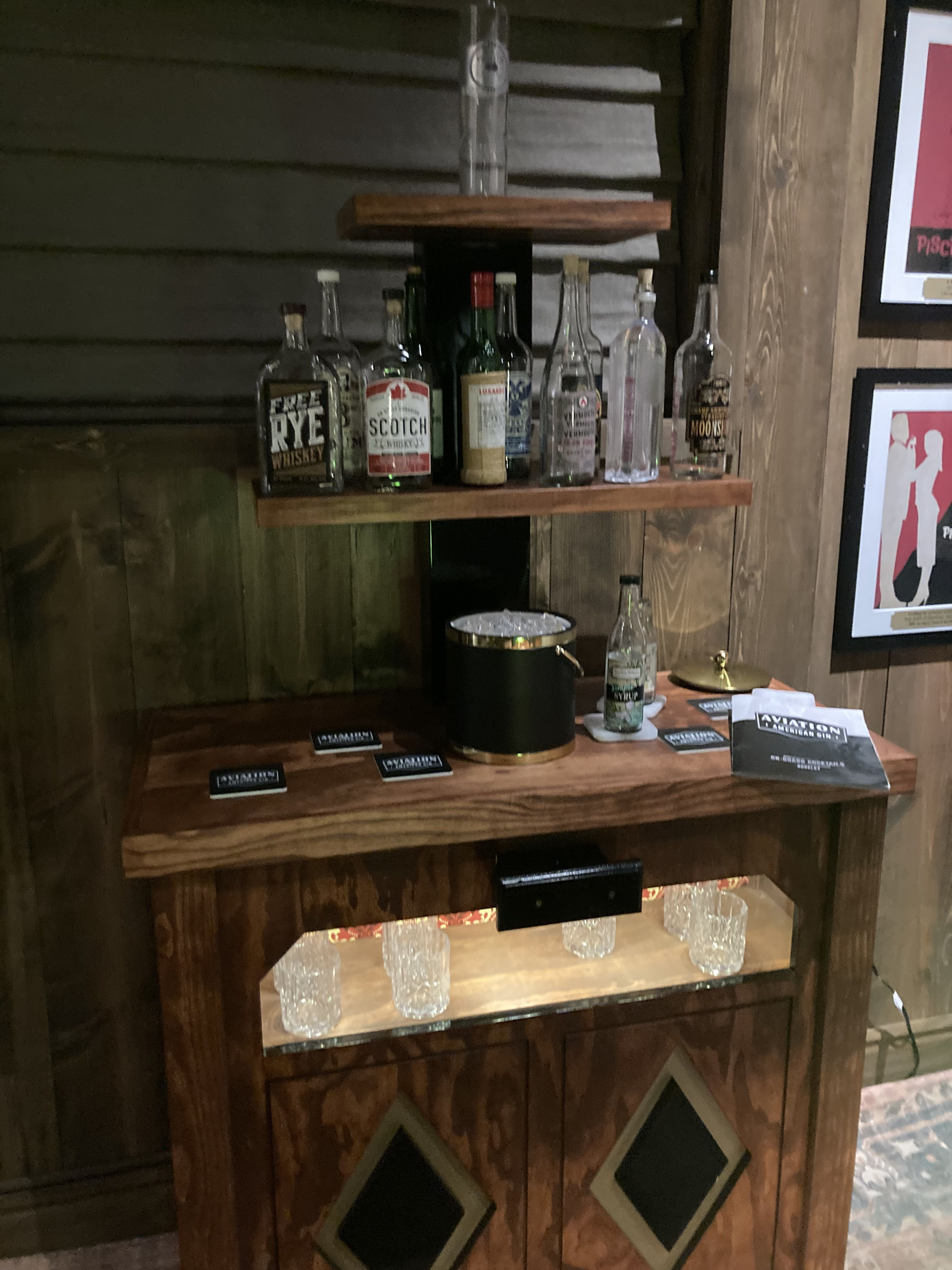
Bar in escape room themed as Ryan Reynolds's office on distillery tour
