= River Pig Saloon =

Pair of bars in the U.S. state of Oregon

Coordinates: 45.52688°N 122.68452°W

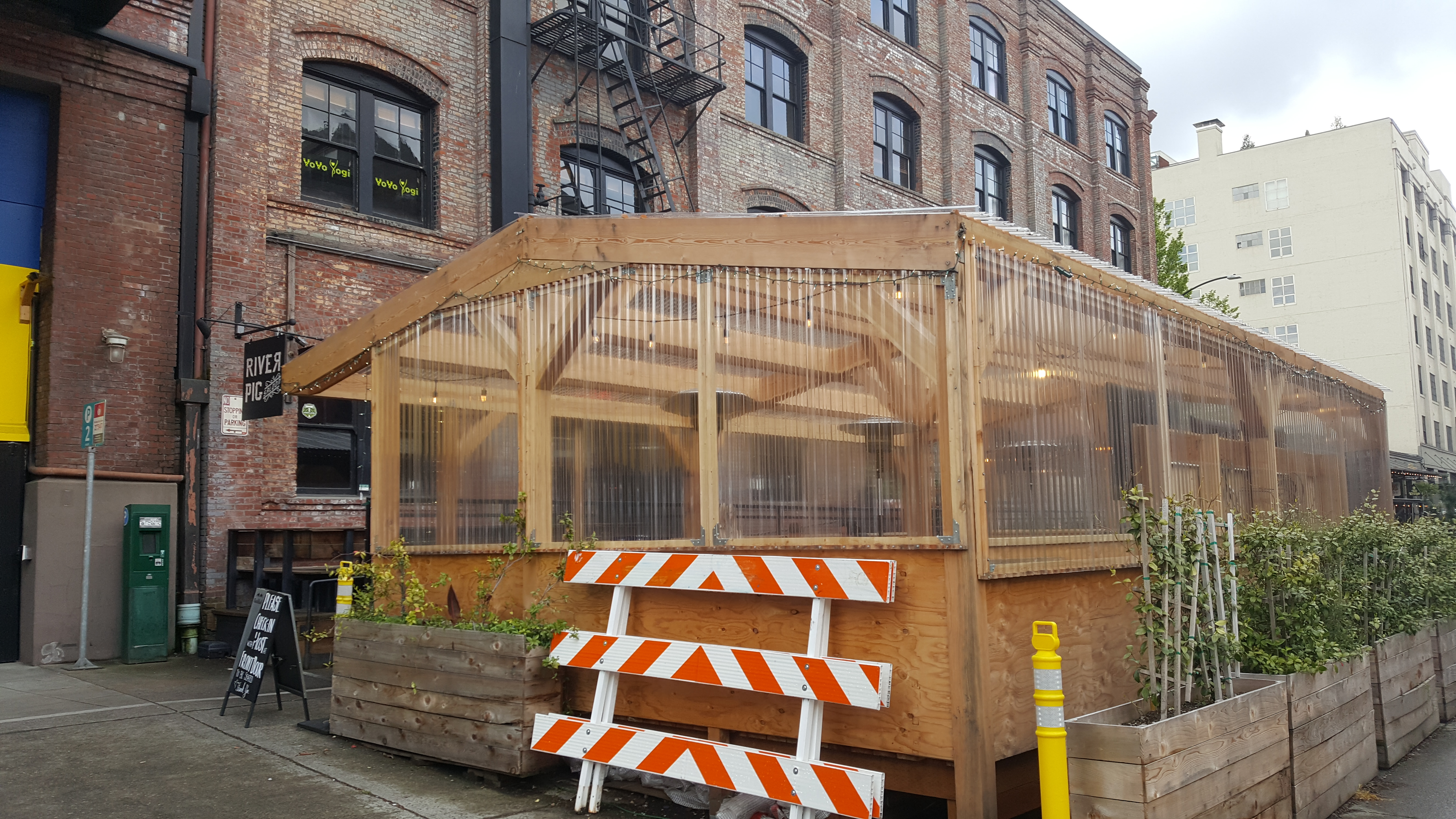
- Exterior of the bar in Portland, Oregon, 2022
- Interactive map of River Pig Saloon

Restaurant information
- Location: Oregon, United States

River Pig Saloon is a small chain of bars in the United States. The business has two locations in Oregon (Portland and Bend) and another in Dallas, Texas. Ramzy Hattar is the owner.

== Description and history ==
=== Oregon ===
The Portland bar, located in the Pearl District, opened in 2014. Thrillist describes the location as "your neighborhood bar that brings some grit back" to the Pearl District. The Bend location opened May 2018.

Employees at both Oregon locations were laid off during the COVID-19 pandemic. In 2020, the city allowed the Portland bar to use part of the street for socially distanced service during the pandemic. The Bend bar closed temporarily during the pandemic, and was later fined by the Oregon Liquor Control Commission in 2021.

Three people were injured from a shooting at the Portland bar in 2026. Additionally, a woman was arrested for biting someone and assaulting another.

=== Texas ===
Plans to expand to Dallas were announced in August 2022. The bar opened in late December.

== See also ==
- List of restaurant chains in the United States
