= Century Bar =

Bar and restaurant in Portland, Oregon, U.S.

- Interactive map of Century Bar

Restaurant information
- Established: June 16, 2016
- Food type: American
- Location: 930 Southeast Sandy Boulevard, Portland, Multnomah, Oregon, 97214, United States
- Coordinates: 45.5210°N 122.6558°W
- Seating capacity: 318
- Website: centurybarpdx.com

Century Bar, or simply Century, was a bar and restaurant in Portland, Oregon. The business began operating in 2016 and had closed by mid 2021.

== Description ==
Century Bar was a 318-seat sports bar housed in a former printing shop on Sandy Boulevard in southeast Portland's Buckman neighborhood. Vegan options include mushroom tacos to buffalo artichoke wings.

== History ==
Jacob Carey, Ian David, Liam Duffy, Ben Hufford, John Janulis, and Clyde Wooten opened Century Bar. Nathan VanDeventer managed the bar operation and Russell Van der Genugten served as chef. The bar opened on June 16, 2016, slightly later than previously reported target dates of November 2015 and February 2016.

Century Bar hosted the Negroni Social to kickoff Negroni Week in June 2016, and has also hosted screenings by Church of Film. Century closed temporarily during the COVID-19 pandemic, reopening a few weeks after Multnomah County reached Phase 1. The bar had closed permanently by mid 2021.

== Reception ==
Century Bar was nominated in the Design of the Year and Most Stunning Restaurant of the Year categories for the 2016 Eater Awards, presented by Eater Portland; the bar was named editor's choice in the former category. In 2016, Willamette Week's Sophia June wrote, "Century is the sports bar Portland has been waiting for", and the newspaper's Martin Cizmar said in 2017, "Watching a big game at Century feels like you're ringside for a prizefight—the energy exceeds any other sports bar I've been to, and I've been to a few." In 2020, Eater Portland's Alex Frane included Century in his list of "Portland's 10 Ideal Rooftop Patios For Views, Drinks, and Sun".
