= Delta Work =

American drag performer and stylist

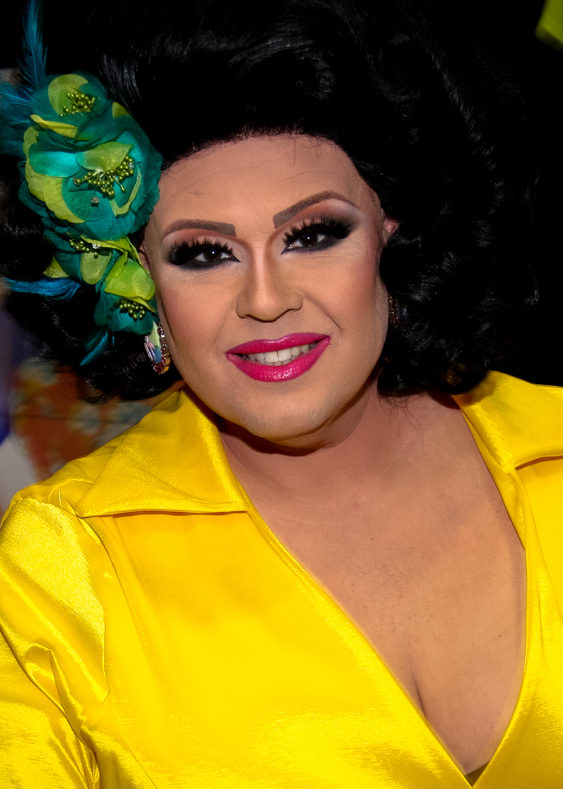
- Delta Work in 2017
- Born: Gabriel A. Villarreal; January 23, 1976 (age 50); Los Angeles County, California, USA
- Occupations: Drag queen; stylist
- Awards: Primetime Emmy Award for Outstanding Hairstyling for a Multi-Camera Series or Special (2018)

Gabriel A. Villarreal, known professionally as Delta Work, is an Emmy Award-winning American drag performer and stylist, best known for competing on the third season (2011) of the reality competition television series RuPaul's Drag Race.

Work received the Primetime Emmy Award for Outstanding Hairstyling for a Multi-Camera Series or Special at the 70th Primetime Creative Arts Emmy Awards (2018) for her work as a personal hairstylist for RuPaul on Drag Race.

Work hosted the podcast Very That alongside season-three winner and fellow drag performer Raja. She is the host the podcast Very Delta, following the end of Very That, produced by Moguls of Media (MOM) Podcasts.

== Early life ==
Villarreal was born in Los Angeles County, California. Her father was a veteran of the Vietnam War who was subjected to Agent Orange during his service. Villarreal grew up in Norwalk, California. She and her mother would go to Escondido, California to go to a bakery called Muffin Break.

== Career ==
Work's drag mother is Miss Coco Peru, whom she met in Los Angeles during the start of her drag career. She names Chad Michaels, her Dreamgirls Revue co-star, as a "mentor". Work started dressing in drag on Halloween night 1998, at age 22, when she attended a rave in a "Natalie Merchant" style dress. She had her real drag debut at Ozz in Buena Park at one of Raja Gemini's Sunday Night Drag shows, dancing to a CD of Katalina's "DJ Girl."

Before her television debut, Work was active in the night club scene. She was a performer and producer at Southern California's longest running drag show, the Dreamgirls Revue, and frequented the local contest circuit at clubs like Drag-A-Licious at Club Ripples in Long Beach and Drag-O-Rama at Ultra Suede in WeHo.

Her drag name originates from when she attended a drag show and the performing group of queens, who were parodying Designing Women, needed a "bigger" queen to play the role of Delta Burke's character, Suzanne Sugarbaker. After agreeing to and finishing the role, one queen commented afterwards that "you are not Delta Burke, you are Delta Work!"

=== RuPaul's Drag Race ===
Work was selected, along with twelve other contestants, for the third season of RuPaul's Drag Race, which began airing on January 24, 2011, on LOGO TV. During the season, Work chose to impersonate Cher (a celebrity she is not typically known for portraying) for the "Snatch Game" episode, where contestants embody a celebrity, in look and persona, and participate in an improv challenge similar to shows such as Hollywood Squares or Match Game. Bowen Yang wrote: "Delta barely made an attempt at all... Points for the wink at Bob Mackie with her look, but otherwise Delta just waded around in her nothing-doing. Snap out of it!" She placed seventh overall, losing a lip sync performance to Manila Luzon to Donna Summer's "MacArthur Park". Out called the battle "certainly one of the most famous lip syncs" of the show.

After season three, Work was seen as an audience member attending the season five (2013) and season six (2014) finale episodes, and was a guest with other Drag Race alumni for the first-episode challenge on season ten (2018). Work was hired as RuPaul's personal wig-stylist for her judges' panel looks beginning with the second episode of the ninth season (2017), with season two (2010) alumnus Raven styling Rupaul's makeup. Work appeared as a guest for the first challenge in the premiere of season eleven (2019).

In a 2023 interview with Joseph Shepherd, Work revealed that she did not work as RuPaul's wig stylist beyond the eleventh season. This was largely because of contractual disagreements over her involvement in RuPaul's Netflix series AJ and the Queen, which led to another wig stylist being hired, who continued to work with RuPaul after that. Work also stated that World of Wonder, the producers of RuPaul's Drag Race, intentionally refrained from submitting her name for Emmy consideration for the eleventh season, despite her having done the same job as the tenth season when she won the award, because she was no longer working with them. According to Work, during her last phone call with RuPaul, she was told in a casual manner, "If anything comes up, I'll let you know."

=== Post-Drag Race ===
As a cast member of Drag Race, Work appeared on a 2011 episode of E!'s The Soup with RuPaul, Raja, and Shangela. She made recurring appearances on WoWPresent's internet show Fashion Photo RuView, filling in for Raja or Raven to critique looks from Drag Race alumni and various other celebrities, with her first appearance on November 19, 2014. However, this has ceased since Work no longer styles RuPaul. She also made regular appearances on the web show The Pit Stop, which reviews each weekly episode of Drag Race. She was on its debut episode on August 27, 2016.

Work appeared on the cover of Skorch Magazine in 2013. In August 2015, she headlined Palouse Pride in Moscow, Idaho. On August 6, 2016, she was invited on stage by Adele during a Los Angeles concert, while in full drag as an Adele impersonator. They took a selfie, which quickly went viral.

Work received the Primetime Emmy Award for Outstanding Hairstyling for a Multi-Camera Series or Special at the 70th Primetime Creative Arts Emmy Awards (2018) for her work. She portrayed Adele in the music video for Taylor Swift's "You Need to Calm Down" (June 2019). Work performed with Taylor Swift and Miley Cyrus at the MTV VMAs. In 2019, Work was the grand marshal of Long Beach Pride.

From September 2020 to May 2023 Work co-hosted the conversational podcast Very That on the Forever Dog and Moguls of Media networks, alongside her RuPaul's Drag Race season three castmate Raja, where the duo discussed recent news and answer questions from fans. The podcast's executive producers included fellow RuPaul's Drag Race alumni Alaska Thunderfuck and Willam Belli, who now host their own Drag Race review podcast, Race Chasers.

While Raja was traveling, after competing on season seven of RuPaul's Drag Race All Stars, Work began hosting the spin-off podcast Very Delta, described as a "luxury public access podcast". The podcast continued after the eventual conclusion of its parent show Very That. On Very Delta, Work interviews celebrities, drag performers, and nightlife personalities from the Southern California area and beyond. Notable interviewees include Bianca Del Rio, Candis Cayne, Thorgy Thor, Jessica Wild and Margaret Cho.

In July 2023, Work began hosting More Very Delta, a supplement to the main podcast available exclusively to MOM Plus Gold subscribers. In the same month, Work won the award for Best Local Radio/Podcast Personality for the Orange County, South Bay and Westside areas in the 2023 Best of the Southland awards, presented by the Los Angeles Times.

=== Music ===
Delta Work released her debut solo single, "The Walkin' Blues (Walk Right In, Walk Right Out)", on May 12, 2015. She had previously recorded music as part of The Heathers, with Manila Luzon, Raja, and Carmen Carrera. The group released their debut single "Lady Marmalade" on June 6, 2014.

On November 16, 2023, Work released the collaborative single "I Want House" with dance music duo BOY2K, based on a viral monologue from Very Delta.

== Personal life ==
Work works and lives in Norwalk, California, as of 2011.

== Filmography ==
=== Film ===
Year	Title	Role	Notes
2018	Frankly a Mess	Miss Edamame	
2022	Sex with Sue	Herself	

=== Television ===
Year	Title	Role	Notes	Ref.
2011	RuPaul's Drag Race (season 3)	Herself	Contestant (seventh place)	
2011	RuPaul's Drag Race: Untucked	Herself		
2011	The Soup	Herself	Episode: "The Soup Awards"	
2012	Are You There, Chelsea?	Bartender	Cameo (1 episode)	
2012	RuPaul's Drag Race All Stars (season 1)	Herself	Guest (1 episode)	
2018	RuPaul's Drag Race (season 10)	Herself	Guest (1 episode)	
2019	RuPaul's Drag Race (season 11)	Herself	Guest (2 episodes)	
2021	NewsBeat	Herself	Correspondent	
2023	Gogo for the Gold	Herself	Episode: "Heel Appeal"	

=== Music videos ===
Year	Title	Artist	Notes	Ref.
2014	"Lady Marmalade"	The Heathers		
2019	"Go Fish"	Manila Luzon		
2019	"You Need to Calm Down"	Taylor Swift	Adele impersonator	
2020	"Ass Like Mine"	Morgan McMichaels	Herself	
2020	"Nerves of Steel"	Erasure	Herself	

=== Web series ===
Year	Title	Role	Ref.
2013	Ring My Bell	Herself	
2013	Cooking With Needles	Herself	
2014–19	Fashion Photo Ruview	Herself	
2015–2020	Hey Qween!	Herself	
2015	Dear Delta	Herself	
2016–19	The Pit Stop	Herself	

=== Podcasts ===
Year	Title	Role	Notes	Ref.
2016	RuPaul: What's the Tee?	Guest	Episode: "Theraposer with Delta Work"	
2019, 2021	Race Chaser with Alaska and Willam	Guest	3 episodes; Moguls of Media production	
2020–2023	Very That with Delta and Raja	Co-host	With Raja; 115 episodes; Moguls of Media production	
2020–2022	Sloppy Seconds with Big Dipper and Meatball	Guest	3 episodes; Moguls of Media production	
2022–present	Very Delta	Host	Moguls of Media production	
2023	Fierce Rivalries	Co-host	With Kelsey Padgett; 24 episodes; Somethin' Else and Sony Music Entertainment production	
2023	I've Had It	Guest	Episode: "Is It Still Mansplaining If You're in Drag? with Delta Work"	
2023–present	More Very Delta	Host	Moguls of Media production; MOM Plus Gold exclusive extension of Very Delta	

== Discography ==
=== Singles ===
Year	Title	Album
2014	"Lady Marmalade" (with Raja, Manila Luzon and Carmen Carrera, as The Heathers)	Non-album singles
2015	"The Walkin' Blues (Walk Right In, Walk Right Out)"	Non-album singles
2023	"I Want House" (with BOY2K)	Non-album singles

== Awards and nominations ==
Year	Award	Category	Nominated work	Result	Ref.
2018	Primetime Emmy Awards	Outstanding Hairstyling for a Multi-Camera Series or Special	RuPaul's Drag Race (Episode: "10s Across the Board")	Won	
2019	MTV Video Music Awards	Video of the Year	"You Need to Calm Down" (as creative producer)	Won	
2019	MTV Video Music Awards	Video for Good	"You Need to Calm Down" (as creative producer)	Won	
2023	Los Angeles Times Best of the Southland Awards	Best Local Radio/Podcast Personality (Orange County)	Very Delta	Won	
2023	Los Angeles Times Best of the Southland Awards	Best Local Radio/Podcast Personality (South Bay)	Very Delta	Won	
2023	Los Angeles Times Best of the Southland Awards	Best Local Radio/Podcast Personality (Westside)	Very Delta	Won	
2023	Los Angeles Times Best of the Southland Awards	Best Local Radio/Podcast Personality (Overall)	Very Delta	Won	
2024	Queerty Awards	Podcast	Very Delta	Runner-up	
2024	QueerX Awards	Best Podcast	Very Delta	Nominated	
2025	Queerty Awards	Podcast	Very Delta	Won	
