= Very Delta =

American podcast and web series

- Genre: Comedy, Beauty
- Country of origin: United States
- Language: English

Cast and voices
- Hosted by: Delta Work

Production
- Editing: Doug Robertson
- Length: 41–81 minutes

Publication
- No. of episodes: 193
- Original release: July 4, 2022 – present
- Provider: MOM (Moguls of Media)
- Updates: Weekly (Monday)

Related
- Related shows: Very That
- Website: https://verydelta.com/

Very Delta is a conversational comedy podcast and web series hosted by American drag queen Delta Work which premiered on July 4, 2022. Styled as a "luxury public access podcast", the series features Delta Work discussing first world problems, interviewing guests and answering fan letters.

== History ==
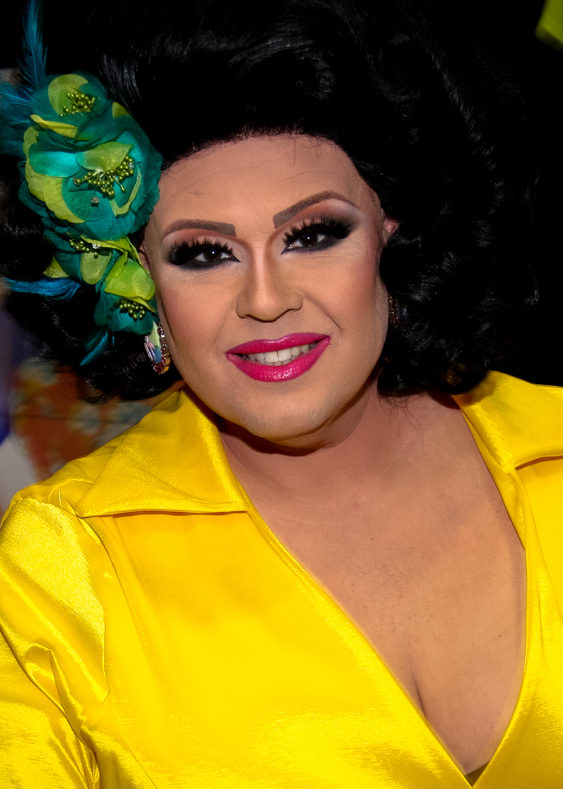
Delta Work in 2017

Very Delta began as a temporary replacement show for Delta Work's podcast Very That which she co-hosted with Raja Gemini while Raja went on tour after appearing on the seventh season of RuPaul's Drag Race All Stars. However, the show quickly blossomed into a "bona fide sensation... part gospel, part talk show, and wholly singular, just like the queen at its helm". Delta continued to host Very That upon Raja's return while fronting Very Delta, until Very That was eventually rested.

In July 2023 More Very Delta, an extension of the main podcast available exclusively to MOM Plus Gold subscribers, premiered.

From July 2022 to March 2025, the show was aired on Mondays through Moguls of Media's YouTube channel. From March 2025 onwards the show is aired in two parts on a dedicated Very Delta YouTube channel: the "Go Off Delta!" segment is released on Mondays and the guest interview is released on Wednesdays. The full episode is released on podcast platforms on Mondays.

== Format ==
Each episode of Very Delta begins with the segment "Go Off Delta!", in which the host discusses whichever topic is on her mind. The opening segment's themes "have run the gamut from customer service to social norms", but typically focus on what are considered first world problems. The show has received criticism for this, but Delta "recognizes that her ability to talk about food and the banalities of everyday life is a "privilege" - "there's so many bigger things happening," she says".

The second and longest segment of the show, typically lasting around 30 minutes, is an interview with Delta's guest, often a mainstay of the Southern California nightlife scene. The final segment of each episode is "Read Me Delta!" in which Delta and her guest read and respond to fan letters asking questions and seeking advice.

The show's repeat guests include Raja, who has appeared thrice, and Alaska, Bob the Drag Queen, Daya Betty, Detox, Lady Bunny, Lushious Massacr, Manila Luzon and Mayhem Miller, who have appeared twice.

== Episodes ==
No.	Title	Length	Original release date
1	"Are You a Lady Like Me? (w/ Samantha Hale)"	54:28	July 4, 2022
2	"Are You Intellectual Like Me? (w/ Natasha Estrada)"	57:38	July 11, 2022
3	"Are You Beguiled By a Bargain Like Me? (w/ Detox)"	43:27	July 18, 2022
4	"Are You Serving The Community Like Me? (w/ Jazzmun)"	52:25	July 25, 2022
5	"Are You A Brunch Enthusiast Like Me? (w/ Sharok)"	49:52	August 1, 2022
6	"Do You Love A Statement Hat? (w/ Eddie DeBarr)"	49:59	August 8, 2022
7	"Are you Spicy and Creamy Like Me? (w/ David Rios)"	53:08	August 15, 2022
8	"Are You An Eye-Con Like Me? (w/ Raja)"	57:54	August 22, 2022
9	"If You Like Angel, You'll Love Cloud Demon (w/ Jonny McGovern)"	48:43	August 29, 2022
10	"Are You Romantic Like Me? (w/ Vander Von Odd)"	46:21	September 5, 2022
11	"Are You Pre-Sweetened Like Me? (w/ Alaska)"	53:38	September 12, 2022
12	"Do You Wear Your Hair in a Ponytail Like Me? (w/ Tony Medina)"	47:16	September 19, 2022
13	"Do You Dress Yourself Up In Chanel Like Me? (w/ Chanel Perrillo)"	52:58	September 26, 2022
14	"Are You Very Scary Delta Like Me? (w/ Mayhem Miller)"	47:51	October 3, 2022
15	"Were You Moisturized in a Past Life Like Me? (w/ Madame Pamita)"	49:14	October 10, 2022
16	"Do You Love A Gift Card Like Me? (w/ Landon Cider)"	1:07:20	October 17, 2022
17	"Are You High Voltage Like Me? (w/ Obi)"	46:32	October 24, 2022
18	"Very Delta Live (w/ Jackie Beat)"	55:15	October 31, 2022
19	"Do You Add Non-Diary Creamer Like Me? (w/ Jujubee)"	57:14	November 7, 2022
20	"Are You Estranja Like Me? (w/ Laganja Estranja)"	1:04:46	November 14, 2022
21	"Do You Like Long Walks In The Kitchen Like Me? (w/ Esteban Castillo)"	1:00:07	November 21, 2022
22	"Are You Annie Potts Like Me? (w/ Fena Barbitall)"	1:09:54	November 28, 2022
23	"Are You Very Merry Delta Like Me? (w/ Nick Pagliochini)"	46:56	December 5, 2022
24	"Are You Cake Like Me? (w/ Andrew Fuller)"	1:09:58	December 12, 2022
25	"Do You Show Them How You Burlesque Like Me? (w/ Jessabelle Thunder)"	1:12:24	December 19, 2022
26	"Do You Keep Your Christmas Tree Up Like Me? (w/ Jaida Essence Hall)"	1:07:22	January 9, 2023
27	"Do You Have Katz Like Me? (w/ Evan Ross Katz)"	1:04:11	January 16, 2023
28	"Is It Your Birthday Episode Like Me? (w/ Jewels Long Beach)"	1:15:44	January 23, 2023
29	"Are You In The Sweet Dewy Woman Brigade Like Me? (w/ Mrs. Kasha Davis)"	1:02:10	January 30, 2023
30	"Are You Notorious Like Me? (w/ Margaret Cho)"	1:02:58	February 6, 2023
31	"Are You a Goddess Like Me? (w/ Venus D-Lite)"	54:54	February 13, 2023
32	"Are You Successful Like Me? (w/ Mariah Balenciaga)"	1:08:23	February 20, 2023
33	"Do You Feel Love Like Me? (w/ Kylie Sonique Love)"	1:21:02	February 27, 2023
34	"Do You Gay Kitchen Like Me? (w/ Elliott Norris)"	50:56	March 6, 2023
35	"Are You Nicole Paige Brooks Like Me? (w/ Nicole Paige Brooks)"	1:04:27	March 13, 2023
36	"Are You Delta Lake Like Me? (w/ Darienne Lake)"	1:11:29	March 20, 2023
37	"Do You Carrión Like Me? (w/ April Carrión)"	1:03:25	March 27, 2023
38	"Are You Coco For Peru Like Me? (w/ Coco Peru)"	1:21:55	April 3, 2023
39	"Do You XOXO, Cody Like Me? (w/ Cody Rigsby)"	1:04:17	April 10, 2023
40	"Do You Very Naomi Smalls Like Me? (w/ Naomi Smalls)"	1:16:53	April 17, 2023
41	"Do You Very Rhea Litré Like Me? (w/ Rhea Litré)"	1:05:50	April 24, 2023
42	"Are You a Rainbow Like Me? (w/ Mark Kanemura)"	1:02:38	May 1, 2023
43	"Can You Carmen Carrera Like Me? (w/ Carmen Carrera)"	1:00:08	May 8, 2023
44	"Do You Love Lola Like Me? (w/ Lola)"	55:49	May 15, 2023
45	"(w/ Manila Luzon)"	56:00	May 22, 2023
46	"Are You Trixie Mattel Like Me? (w/ Trixie Mattel)"	1:10:12	May 29, 2023
47	"Are You Beguiled By A Byer? (w/ Nicole Byer)"	56:36	June 5, 2023
48	"Are You Beguiled By A BibleGirl? (w/ BibleGirl)"	55:28	June 12, 2023
49	"Do You Adore Cilantro Like Me? (w/ Adore Delano)"	58:13	June 19, 2023
50	"Are You A MOM Executive Like Me? (w/ Willam)"	58:30	June 26, 2023
51	"Are You Coco For The Chanell Twins? (w/ Christy Girlington & Linda Evangelipstick)"	57:14	July 3, 2023
52	"One-year Anniversary Like Me! (w/ DiDa Ritz)"	1:03:50	July 10, 2023
53	"Are You Beguiled By A Betty? (w/ Daya Betty)"	56:37	July 17, 2023
54	"Are You Beguiled By A Biqtch? (w/ Biqtch Puddin)"	54:18	July 24, 2023
55	"Are You Very Delta Fan Favourite Kelly Mantle? (w/ Kelly Mantle)"	55:44	July 31, 2023
56	"Do You Live For Maria Like Me? (w/ Maria Roman-Taylorson)"	57:23	August 7, 2023
57	"Are You The Drag Queen Like Me? (w/ Bob The Drag Queen)"	1:05:57	August 14, 2023
58	"Are You A Lady Bunny Like Me? (w/ Lady Bunny)"	52:52	August 21, 2023
59	"Do You Hit It Like Me? (w/ Candis Cayne)"	58:40	August 28, 2023
60	"Are You Thorgeous Like Me? (w/ Thorgy Thor)"	1:04:38	September 4, 2023
61	"Are You Orville Like Me? (w/ Orville Peck)"	1:00:46	September 11, 2023
62	"Do You Have 6 Like Me? (w/ 6)"	58:24	September 18, 2023
63	"Do You Oop! Like Me? (w/ Jasmine Masters)"	59:14	September 25, 2023
64	"Are You Sugar & Spice Like Me? (w/ Sugar & Spice)"	1:10:46	October 2, 2023
65	"Are You A Forever Eye-Con Like Me? (w/ Raja)"	1:02:21	October 9, 2023
66	"Are You Very Scary Essex? (w/ Cheryl Hole)"	55:51	October 16, 2023
67	"Are You Beguiled By Big Dee? (w/ Big Dee)"	55:15	October 23, 2023
68	"Are You LaQueer Like Me? (w/ Madame LaQueer)"	56:09	October 30, 2023
69	"Are You Very Jazmyn? (w/ Jazmyn Simone)"	49:59	November 6, 2023
70	"Are You Moni Stat Like Me? (w/ Moni Stat)"	53:59	November 13, 2023
71	"Are You Very Del Rio? (w/ Bianca Del Rio)"	1:05:38	November 20, 2023
72	"Do You Hieeee! Like Me? (w/ Ongina)"	58:45	November 27, 2023
73	"Are You Mariah Carey Like Me? (w/ Mariah Carey Carrie)"	56:07	December 4, 2023
74	"Are You Velour Like Me? (w/ Sasha Velour)"	48:54	December 11, 2023
75	"Do You Go To The Buffet Like Me? (w/ Kendra Onixx)"	58:10	December 18, 2023
76	"Do You Celebrate Your Birthday Like Me? (w/ Mija)"	50:30	January 22, 2024
77	"Are You A Model Like Me? (w/ Luxx Noir London)"	1:01:29	January 29, 2024
78	"Are You Running For Congress Like Me? (w/ Maebe A. Girl)"	54:53	February 5, 2024
79	"Do You Brush Your Chest Hair Like Me? (w/ Mr. Teddy Bear)"	49:18	February 12, 2024
80	"Are You A Fat Slur Like Me? (w/ Meatball)"	1:07:54	February 19, 2024
81	"Are You The Drag Lord Like Me? (w/ Manila Luzon)"	59:59	March 4, 2024
82	"Do You Like Tiny Foods Like Me? (w/ Scarlett BoBo)"	49:45	March 11, 2024
83	"Do You Own A Production Company Like Me? (w/ Phoenix)"	56:08	March 18, 2024
84	"Are You Escándalo Like Me? (w/ Jessica Wild)"	51:06	March 25, 2024
85	"Do You Slunch Like Me? (w/ Katya)"	58:35	April 1, 2024
86	"Are You A Future Wife Like Me? (w/ Dulcé Sloan)"	49:53	April 8, 2024
87	"Do You Fix Toilets Like Me? (w/ Loosey LaDuca)"	59:53	April 15, 2024
88	"Are You A Jerky Connoisseur Like Me? (w/ Angeria Paris VanMicheals)"	1:01:40	April 22, 2024
89	"Are You Mami And Papi Like Me? (w/ Naysha Lopez)"	1:04:17	April 29, 2024
90	"Are You A Dreamgirl Like Me? (w/ Fontasia L’Amour)"	53:54	May 6, 2024
91	"Eureka O'Hara talks about drug usage, $400 tips and her favorite gumbo"	1:01:46	May 13, 2024
92	"Do You Krump For Christ Like Me? (w/ Jonathan Carson & Zachariah Porter)"	53:54	May 20, 2024
93	"Melissa Befierce talks about Dragula, La Llorona and dead fish in the club"	1:01:28	May 27, 2024
94	"Cosmo Lombino, "Queen of Melrose" talks about trade, substance abuse & cruising in the 80’s"	1:02:04	June 3, 2024
95	"Salina EsTitties talks about throwing ass, Cool Ranch Doritos and her EP Homegirl"	1:01:22	June 10, 2024
96	"Are You A Showgirl Like Me? with Vanity Halston"	1:00:19	June 17, 2024
97	"Are You In The Burlesque Hall of Fame Like Me? w/ Tito Bonito"	59:32	June 24, 2024
98	"Are You A Fashion Wellness Queen Like Me? w/ Detox"	59:38	July 1, 2024
99	"Do You Goon Like Me? with John Hill"	58:00	July 8, 2024
100	"Are You 100 Like Me? with Raja"	57:20	July 15, 2024
101	"Do You Love Sausage Like Me? with Daniel Franzese"	56:20	July 22, 2024
102	"Are You A Drag Legend Like Me? with Sherry Vine"	59:26	July 29, 2024
103	"Are You A Creature of the Night Like Me? with Lushious Massacr"	58:00	August 5, 2024
104	"Do You Love Nutcrackers Like Me? with Shannel"	1:00:47	August 12, 2024
105	"Are You A Star Like Me? with Alexis Mateo"	59:35	August 19, 2024
106	"Are You In A Wax Museum Like Me? with Courtney Act"	58:44	August 26, 2024
107	"Do You Love Heinz Beanz Like Me? with Tayce"	1:00:05	September 2, 2024
108	"Do You Read Like Me? with Your Friend Kevin"	58:58	September 9, 2024
109	"Do You F*lch Like Me? with Yvie Oddly"	56:13	September 16, 2024
110	"Are You The Queen Of All Queens Like Me? with Jinkx Monsoon"	1:02:07	September 23, 2024
111	"Do You Love Shelley Duvall Like Me? with Pandora Boxx"	57:40	September 30, 2024
112	"Do You Travel With Green Tabasco Like Me? with Alaska"	59:06	October 7, 2024
113	"Do You Love Dino Nuggets Like Me? with Joseph Shepherd"	53:34	October 14, 2024
114	"Are You An Award Winning Comedian Like Me? with Bob The Drag Queen"	57:20	October 21, 2024
115	"Are You On The Cover of Fangoria Like Us? with The Boulet Brothers"	58:17	October 28, 2024
116	"Psychic Medium Travis Holp: Delta Receives Messages From A Loved One In Spirit"	51:48	November 4, 2024
117	"Do You Want House Like Us? with BOY2K"	53:27	November 11, 2024
118	"Are You A Ventriloquist Like Me? with Boa"	57:17	November 18, 2024
119	"Are You A Descendant Of The Dragon Like Me? with Aurora Matrix"	54:51	November 25, 2024
120	"Do You Wake & Bake Like Me? with Sasha Colby"	1:03:37	December 2, 2024
121	"Are You A Wet Nightmare Like Me? with Asia Consent"	57:43	December 9, 2024
122	"Do You Feel Jovani Like Me? with Countess Luann de Lesseps"	54:34	December 16, 2024
123	"Are You An Alien Like Me? with Vicky Vox"	56:58	January 27, 2025
124	"Are You From Santa Ana Like Me? with Satanna"	56:52	February 3, 2025
125	"Do You Have A Loose Wrist Like Me? with Cazwell"	59:06	February 10, 2025
126	"Do You Hunt Ghosts Like Me? with Roz Hernandez"	55:29	February 17, 2025
127	"Do You Love Rey Mysterio Jr. Like Me? with Kornbread"	58:19	February 24, 2025
128	"Are You A City Boy Like Me? with Mario Diaz"	53:12	March 3, 2025
129	"Are You A Power Top Like Me? with Farrah Moan"	59:59	March 10, 2025
130	"Do You Have An Emmy Like Me? with Laila McQueen"	57:56	March 17, 2025
131	"Chelsea Handler Loves Anal"	1:02:37	March 25, 2025
132	"Derrick Barry Stans Poppers"	1:01:02	March 31, 2025
133	"Kim Chi Talks Drag Origins"	1:00:00	April 7, 2025
134	"Latrice Royale Talks Cruise Ship Toilets"	1:01:04	April 14, 2025
135	"Kerri Colby And Her Beautiful Gowns"	1:07:07	April 21, 2025
136	"Kandy Muse = Star Quality"	55:28	April 28, 2025
137	"Justin Martindale is Tiny and Tight"	1:01:38	May 5, 2025
138	"Nymphia Wind Loves Str8 Daddies"	55:02	May 12, 2025
139	"Ebony Lane is Clipping B*tches"	1:03:44	May 19, 2025
140	"Pearl Talks Camper Van Life"	58:45	May 26, 2025
141	"Congressman Robert Garcia talks the United States Congress"	1:04:00	June 2, 2025
142	"Ivy Colby is a total Glamourpuss"	57:11	June 9, 2025
143	"Brynn Taylor talks DJing Queer Nightlife"	58:43	June 16, 2025
144	"Dr. Jon Paul Higgins is Black, Fat & Femme"	1:04:34	June 23, 2025
145	"David Archuleta talks American Idol Trauma & Latin Men!"	57:36	June 30, 2025
146	"BenDeLaCreme questions Delta on female anatomy"	1:04:46	July 7, 2025
147	"Pageant suggestions with Rodney Chester"	59:42	July 14, 2025
148	"It's Time for Drag Kings with Tenderoni"	1:06:52	July 21, 2025
149	"Jake Cornell Loves Ogre Loads!"	1:02:10	July 28, 2025
150	"Lushious Massacr hates Labubu"	1:08:28	August 4, 2025
151	""My Life as Dolly Parton" | Vancie Vega"	55:41	August 11, 2025
152	"Sapphira Cristál and her 16 crowns"	1:03:28	August 18, 2025
153	"What Happens Inside the Drag Race Werk Room w/ Cynthia Lee Fontaine"	1:06:23	August 25, 2025
154	"God Warrior's thoughts on the gays | Marguerite Perrin"	1:07:18	September 1, 2025
155	"Amaya Sexton is Ursula"	1:01:32	September 8, 2025
156	"Debbie Gibson...from Playboy to Belle"	58:54	September 15, 2025
157	"Brooke Lynn Hytes is the Ozempic Pioneer"	1:05:56	September 22, 2025
158	"Have YOU Been Blown by Peaches Christ?"	1:16:32	September 29, 2025
159	"Bailey Sarian Teaches Us Where to Hide a Dead Body"	1:14:09	October 6, 2025
160	"How I Met the Ghost of Colonel Sanders | Sylas Dean"	59:37	October 13, 2025
161	"Subway Finally Listened to Me | Abhora (Dragula)"	1:10:59	October 20, 2025
162	"I Saw Your Mom's TikTok | Crystal Methyd (RuPaul's Drag Race)"	1:05:56	October 27, 2025
163	"Plane Jane Beats Her Meat To....???"	1:17:54	November 3, 2025
164	"I Crashed Sia's Secret Illuminati Party | Ryan Asher"	1:03:41	November 10, 2025
165	"Kori King was wasted at the Emmys"	1:15:21	November 17, 2025
166	"KISS MY @SS with Tony & the Kiki"	1:07:14	November 24, 2025
167	"Ru...Where Are the Drag Kings? with King Molasses"	1:11:42	December 1, 2025
168	"MissMa'amShe has left the group chat"	1:09:09	December 8, 2025
169	"Shea Diamond's journey WILL inspire you"	1:35:31	December 15, 2025
170	"What Jay Kay did to get on Dragula"	1:09:54	January 5, 2026
171	"Irene the Alien is a Delta Sky Club girly"	1:20:46	January 12, 2026
172	"Lana Ja'Rae on the best models from Drag Race"	1:02:01	January 19, 2026
173	"I lost Drag Race so many times they hired me - Mayhem Miller"	1:18:59	January 26, 2026
174	"My Weird Beef with Taylor Swift's Wig Stylist - Amanda Tori Meating"	1:06:18	February 2, 2026
175	"Dragula Winner Evah Destruction Is DONE with Toxic "Fans""	1:16:54	February 9, 2026
176	"Heather McDonald on Peeing in Las Vegas Pools"	1:17:15	February 16, 2026
177	"Hari Nef Dishes on Filming "Barbie""	59:27	February 23, 2026
178	"Cheyenne Jackson Loves a Foot in His Mouth"	1:11:18	March 2, 2026
179	"Cynthia Doll Talks Dragula, Life on Mars and Napster"	57:55	March 9, 2026
180	"Tanner Devore Talks Christian Iced Tea, Boomers and IBS!"	1:18:08	March 16, 2026
181	"Matt Ross Talks Grindr, Golfing and STD Ping-Pong!"	1:06:33	March 23, 2026
182	"Lady Bunny Talks Phone Sex, Omeprazole and Scat!"	1:19:12	March 30, 2026
183	"Keith Edwards on the USA, Guy Burritos and AI!"	1:00:43	April 6, 2026
184	"Philip Bailey on I.E. Drag Legends, Cruising and Fant-A-She's!"	1:08:17	April 13, 2026
185	"Olive Ugly on Aldehydes, ASMR and Pissing"	1:01:56	April 20, 2026
186	"Paige Three (Drag Race UK) on Britney, Xtina and Jar Jar Binks"	1:11:49	April 27, 2026
187	"Suzie Toot Talks Tooting, Farting and Sharting!"	1:16:07	May 4, 2026
188	"Joella on the Titanic, X-Rated Films and Slaying!"	1:01:33	May 11, 2026
189	"Acid Betty & Daya Betty Talk Marijuana and Mathematics!"	1:13:39	May 18, 2026
190	"Juno Birch Has Never Had Ambrosia Salad."	1:15:15	May 25, 2026
191	"Varla Jean Merman Has Beef with 50 Cent (the Rapper)"	1:02:20	June 1, 2026
192	"Julio Torres Has 13,000 Unread Emails."	1:03:00	June 8, 2026
193	"Charles Galin King on Autism, Charlie Chaplin & The King of Drag"	1:14:00	June 13, 2026

== Awards and nominations ==
Year	Award	Category	Nominee	Result	Ref.
2023	Los Angeles Times Best of the Southland Awards	Best Local Radio/Podcast Personality (Orange County)	Delta Work	Won	
2023	Los Angeles Times Best of the Southland Awards	Best Local Radio/Podcast Personality (South Bay)	Delta Work	Won	
2023	Los Angeles Times Best of the Southland Awards	Best Local Radio/Podcast Personality (Westside)	Delta Work	Won	
2023	Los Angeles Times Best of the Southland Awards	Best Local Radio/Podcast Personality (Overall)	Delta Work	Won	
2024	Queerty Awards	Podcast	Very Delta	Runner-up	
2024	QueerX Awards	Best Podcast	Very Delta	Nominated	
2025	Queerty Awards	Podcast	Very Delta	Won	
