= RuPaul: What's the Tee? =

Comedy podcast

- Genre: Comedy
- Format: Discussion; Interview
- Language: English

Cast and voices
- Hosted by: RuPaul; Michelle Visage

Publication
- Original release: April 9, 2014

Related
- Website: www.rupaulpodcast.com

RuPaul: What's the Tee? (also known as RuPaul: What's the Tee w/ Michelle Visage) is a comedy podcast first released on April 9, 2014 hosted by American entertainers RuPaul and Michelle Visage. The hosts discuss a wide range of subjects and usually have at least one celebrity guest appear per episode. They often discuss behind-the-scenes topics from RuPaul's Drag Race, where RuPaul and Visage are also hosts. The podcast won a Webby Award in 2018.

At the 2018 RuPaul's DragCon NYC, RuPaul and Visage held three live tapings of the podcast.

== Guests ==
Celebrity guests have included Anastacia, Emma Bunton, Frances Bean Cobain, Elvira, Lady Gaga, Debbie Harry, Marc Jacobs, Rose McGowan, Moby, Kathy Najimy, and Henry Rollins, among many others.

== Episodes ==
No.	Title	Length	Original release date
1	"Drag Race Auditions, Meditation, & Nail Art"	1:05:51	April 9, 2014
2	"Beyoncé, Monogamy, & Let the Music Play"	1:03:32	April 23, 2014
3	"Disco Jesus, Facelifts and Juicing"	1:08:19	May 7, 2014
4	"Creating your own Luck, Bowie & Lace Front Wigs"	1:07:27	May 21, 2014
5	"Navigating the Matrix with Lucian Piane"	1:01:35	June 4, 2014
6	"Perseverance & Oil Pulling with Alaska"	TBA	June 18, 2014
7	"Timeline Failure with Mathu Andersen"	1:08:53	July 2, 2014
8	"22 Inch Weave with Ts Madison"	1:08:34	July 16, 2014
9	"Making it Last with Jamal Sims and Tom Campbell"	59:46	July 30, 2014
10	"Objectification with Miles Davis Moody & Jason Carter"	1:13:38	August 13, 2014
11	"Becoming the Observer of your Mind"	1:03:06	August 27, 2014
12	"Personal Breakthroughs With Tamar Braxton"	56:08	September 10, 2014
13	"It Gets Butter with Latrice Royale"	1:03:34	September 24, 2014
14	"Granny Chaser Featuring Chi Chi LaRue"	1:13:20	October 8, 2014
15	"Bareback Betty"	58:39	October 23, 2014
16	"Uncle Tom With Leah Remini"	1:03:43	November 5, 2014
17	"Heart On My Sleeve With Mary Lambert"	1:09:28	November 19, 2014
18	"Blame It on The Lupus with Kristen Johnston"	TBA	December 3, 2014
19	"Don't Blame It On The Edit"	1:02:00	December 17, 2014
20	"Even Divas Need Day Jobs with Deven Green"	1:10:25	December 31, 2014
21	"Clocking In Overtime with Mariah Balenciaga"	1:08:04	January 14, 2015
22	"Mothers Against Drunk Drag With Raven"	1:15:14	January 28, 2015
23	"Resurrection With Anastacia"	1:07:10	February 11, 2015
24	"Anti-Porn Unicorn With Colleen Ballinger & Miranda Sings"	1:11:46	February 25, 2015
25	"I Kissed a Girl...and I Didn't Like It!"	1:02:09	March 11, 2015
26	"Gay For Thai Food With Dan Bucatinsky"	1:01:48	March 25, 2015
27	"The Traffic Dummy with Wendi McLendon-Covey"	1:13:59	April 8, 2015
28	"Ruenactments"	1:01:12	April 22, 2015
29	"The Big Brother Episode"	1:03:57	May 6, 2015
30	"Retaining Your Brows"	1:12:58	May 15, 2015
31	"Recapping...The Finale!"	1:10:22	June 3, 2015
32	"Abandoning We For I With Henry Rollins"	1:24:23	June 17, 2015
33	"Eye See What You Did With Todrick Hall"	1:12:09	July 1, 2015
34	"Harriet Tuckman With Morgan McMichaels"	1:08:52	July 15, 2015
35	"Big Queen Entrance With Laganja Estranja"	1:06:52	July 29, 2015
36	"The Crunch Heard Round The World With Shangela"	1:08:09	August 12, 2015
37	"The Mirror Has Two Faces"	1:05:37	August 28, 2015
38	"Poop Noodle With Wendy Ho"	1:04:28	September 9, 2015
39	"Hurricane Bianca With Bianca Del Rio"	1:09:46	September 23, 2015
40	"Bossy By Nature With Big Freedia"	1:09:48	October 7, 2015
41	"RATS!!!"	59:44	October 21, 2015
42	"A Pit Crew Christmas"	1:18:12	November 4, 2015
43	"Sweet Piece Of Baklava With Rebecca Romijn"	1:05:30	November 18, 2015
44	"Satan With A U With Raja"	1:11:07	December 2, 2015
45	"Queer Eye For The Queerer Guys With Carson Kressley"	1:08:46	December 16, 2015
46	"Whoreders"	1:04:48	December 30, 2015
47	"Charge It To The Game With Tiffany 'New York' Pollard"	1:06:33	January 13, 2016
48	"Fried Chicken With JuJu Bee"	1:09:17	January 27, 2016
49	"Finding Your Purpose With Cheyenne Jackson"	1:07:57	February 10, 2016
50	"Gaye & Gayer With Ross Mathews"	1:08:33	February 24, 2016
51	"EnterTaintment"	1:12:44	March 9, 2016
52	"Gotta Have Faith With Faith Evans"	1:19:56	March 23, 2016
53	"Punk Rock Herstory With Blondie"	1:04:02	April 6, 2016
54	"Unsung Sondheim With Vivica A. Fox And Thomas Roberts"	1:10:32	April 20, 2016
55	"Born Naked With Marc Jacobs"	1:13:41	May 4, 2016
56	"Supermodel With Gigi Hadid & Chanel Iman"	1:16:13	May 18, 2016
57	"The Struggle is Real but the Hustle is Deep with Alyssa Edwards"	1:13:02	June 1, 2016
58	"Babies With Glasses With Moby"	1:07:39	June 15, 2016
59	"All In The Family With David & Amy Sedaris"	1:01:15	June 29, 2016
60	"Theraposer with Delta Work"	1:09:41	July 13, 2016
61	"Surgery Vacations with Candis Cayne"	1:34:07	July 27, 2016
62	"Lisa Kudrow"	1:26:32	August 10, 2016
63	"Quinn Cummings"	1:01:29	August 24, 2016
64	"Manila Luzon"	1:07:19	September 7, 2016
65	"Nicole Scherzinger"	TBA	September 21, 2016
66	"Detox"	TBA	October 5, 2016
67	"Elvira"	TBA	October 12, 2016
68	"Suzanne Somers"	TBA	October 19, 2016
69	"Justin Tranter"	TBA	October 26, 2016
70	"Aubrey Plaza"	1:08:45	November 2, 2016
71	"Raven-Symoné"	TBA	November 9, 2016
72	"Melora Hardin"	TBA	November 16, 2016
73	"Graham Norton"	TBA	November 23, 2016
74	"Jeffrey Bowyer-Chapman"	TBA	November 30, 2016
75	"Chi Chi DeVayne"	TBA	December 7, 2016
76	"Katya"	TBA	December 14, 2016
77	"A What's the Tee Christmas"	TBA	December 21, 2016
78	"Bruce Vilanch"	TBA	December 28, 2016
79	"Anna Chlumsky"	TBA	January 11, 2017
80	"Niecy Nash"	TBA	January 18, 2017
81	"Ear Hair Trimmers"	1:20:47	January 25, 2017
82	"Anna Faris"	TBA	February 1, 2017
83	"Adam Conover (Adam Ruins Everything)"	TBA	February 8, 2017
84	"Timothy Simons (Veep)"	TBA	February 15, 2017
85	"Leah Remini Returns"	TBA	February 22, 2017
86	"Siedah Garrett"	TBA	March 1, 2017
87	"Tyler Henry (The Hollywood Medium)"	TBA	March 8, 2017
88	"Dan Levy"	TBA	March 15, 2017
89	"Lady Gaga"	TBA	March 23, 2017
90	"The B-52s"	1:07:32	March 29, 2017
91	"Missi Pyle & Zach Selwyn"	1:10:50	April 5, 2017
92	"Our Three Year AnniRUsary"	1:20:53	April 6, 2017
93	"Naya Rivera"	1:09:59	April 12, 2017
94	"Meghan Trainor"	1:12:25	April 19, 2017
95	"Denis O'Hare"	1:03:12	April 27, 2017
96	"Jennie Garth & Tori Spelling"	1:03:55	May 3, 2017
97	"Peeno Noir (An Ode to Ru's Paul) with Tituss Burgess"	1:18:17	May 11, 2017
98	"Lisa Robertson (actress) & Noah Galvin"	1:05:47	May 17, 2017
99	"Marc Maron"	1:06:59	May 24, 2017
100	"Barkmitzvah with Andie MacDowell & Joan Smalls"	1:06:02	May 31, 2017
101	"Kelly Osbourne"	1:15:09	TBA
102	"Natasha Lyonne"	1:14:06	TBA
103	"Norman Lear"	1:07:45	TBA
104	"Carol Kane"	1:13:33	TBA
105	"Bob the Drag Queen"	1:14:31	TBA
106	"Adore Delano"	1:16:41	TBA
107	"Rose McGowan"	1:11:41	TBA
108	"Pat Cleveland"	1:07:05	TBA
109	"Hawaii & Las Vegas"	1:09:51	TBA
110	"Amber Rose and Dr Chris Donaghue"	1:06:00	TBA
111	"Thelma Houston and Freda Payne"	1:12:13	TBA
112	"Adam Lambert"	1:07:57	TBA
113	"Bob Lefsetz and David Russell"	1:33:53	TBA
114	"Tracee Ellis Ross"	1:20:38	TBA
115	"Do It Yourself Colonics"	1:01:46	TBA
116	"Maria Bamford"	1:10:07	TBA
117	"Michael Patrick King and Jody Watley"	1:24:47	TBA
118	"Deadly Manners with Alex Aldea"	28:48	TBA
119	"Ilana Glazer and Eliot Glazer"	1:09:32	TBA
120	"Jinkx Monsoon"	1:14:18	TBA
121	"Chaka Khan"	1:10:57	TBA
122	"Frances Davis"	1:08:28	TBA
123	"Halloween"	50:07	TBA
124	"Randal Kleiser"	1:04:44	TBA
125	"Randy Rainbow"	1:00:56	TBA
126	"Suzanne de Passe"	1:01:45	TBA
127	"LeVar Burton"	1:02:14	TBA
128	"Jenifer Lewis"	1:08:55	TBA
129	"Party in the Margins"	1:09:43	TBA
130	"A What's the Tee Christmas"	1:11:46	TBA
131	"Billy Eichner"	1:15:56	TBA
132	"Winifred Hervey"	1:12:14	TBA
133	"Dan Harris"	1:09:11	TBA
134	"Camel Potanties with Vanessa Hudgens"	1:16:29	TBA
135	"Vanessa Williams and Ross Mathews"	1:02:54	TBA
136	"Queer Eye Returns"	1:00:44	TBA
137	"Constance Zimmer and Jeffrey Bowyer-Chapman"	1:14:21	TBA
138	"Kristin Chenoweth"	1:14:47	TBA
139	"Titus Burgess and Shay Mitchell"	1:10:29	TBA
140	"Emma Bunton (Baby Spice)"	1:10:28	TBA
141	"Chris Colfer & Garcelle Beauvais"	1:02:34	TBA
142	"Matt Walsh"	1:20:14	TBA
143	"Esai Morales"	1:08:34	TBA
144	"Andrew W.K."	1:11:57	TBA
145	"Christina Applegate"	1:09:14	TBA
146	"Shania Twain"	1:16:08	TBA
147	"Bob Harper"	1:12:53	TBA
148	"Kumail Nanjiani & Emily V. Gordon"	1:21:28	TBA
149	"Audra McDonald"	55:33	TBA
150	"Kate Upton"	1:05:04	TBA
151	"Andrew Rannells, Ilana Glazer & Abbi Jacobson"	1:43:12	TBA
152	"Mary Steenburgen"	1:14:26	TBA
153	"Gavin Newsom"	1:14:41	TBA
154	"Miles Heizer"	1:06:30	TBA
155	"Lena Dunham"	1:30:59	TBA
156	"Ashanti"	1:08:17	TBA
157	"Sam Richardson"	1:01:59	TBA
158	"GLOP on GLOW"	1:05:14	TBA
159	"Kay Cannon"	1:15:53	TBA
160	"Paul Scheer & June Diane Raphael"	1:27:32	TBA
161	"Falling Asleep in the Poppies"	1:07:30	TBA
162	"Meat Talk with Carrie Preston"	1:06:55	TBA
163	"If I Can't Sell It...I'll Keep Sitting On It!"	1:07:40	TBA
164	"Cher-ing is Caring"	1:07:51	TBA
165	"Lady Bunny"	1:14:12	TBA
166	"Mindful Hydration"	1:10:18	TBA
167	"Riverdon't"	1:10:16	TBA
168	"Lola & Lillie (Michelle's Daughters)"	1:36:00	TBA
169	"Ivana Chubbuck"	1:08:50	TBA
170	"Don Norman"	1:14:48	TBA
171	"The Emmys"	1:15:19	TBA
172	"Rectum Radio Live"	1:00:22	TBA
173	"Alyssa Edwards, Marc Jacobs & Kim Jones"	1:08:30	TBA
174	"Patti LuPoop"	1:07:51	TBA
175	"Mally Roncal (Live in NYC)"	1:03:19	TBA
176	"Kathy Najimy (Live in NYC)"	1:05:46	TBA
177	"Kids at the Pool"	1:10:30	TBA
178	"Lyrical Missteps"	1:06:49	TBA
179	"Thandie Newton"	1:11:52	TBA
180	"Getting out of Jury Duty"	1:04:54	TBA
181	TBA	TBA	TBA
182	"Evening Shade"	1:04:39	TBA
183	"Jenifer Lewis, Cindy Cowan & the Tenison Twins"	1:05:20	TBA
184	"Ciara & Kacey Musgraves"	51:17	TBA
185	"Gus Kenworthy & Keiynan Lonsdale"	1:05:17	TBA
186	"Zoë Kravitz, Erica Ash, & Tim Bagley"	1:50:16	TBA
187	"Cecily Strong & Yvette Nicole Brown"	1:02:02	TBA
188	"Jamal Sims"	1:09:36	TBA
189	"Suzanne Bartsch & Rita Ora"	1:19:39	TBA
190	"Frances Bean Cobain & Ellen Pompeo"	1:43:37	TBA
191	"Felicity Huffman & Jason Wu"	1:02:05	TBA
192	"Explant"	1:11:02	TBA
193	"Laura Bell Bundy"	1:12:00	TBA
194	"Miley Cyrus, Alec Mapa, Ts Madison & Tiffany "New York" Pollard"	1:51:30	TBA
195	"Sydelle Noel & Bobby Moynihan"	1:37:07	TBA
196	"Troye Sivan & Guillermo Díaz"	1:08:55	TBA
197	"Joel McHale"	1:08:26	TBA
198	"Cara Delevingne"	1:17:03	TBA
199	"Adam Rippon"	1:13:00	TBA
200	"Kandi Burruss & Amber Valletta"	1:10:15	TBA
201	"Tony Hale & Clea DuVall"	TBA	TBA
202	"Fortune Feimster & Cheyeene Jackson"	TBA	TBA
203	"Gina Rodriguez & Katherine Langford"	TBA	TBA
204	"London"	TBA	TBA
205	"Uncle Lotto"	TBA	TBA
206	"John Cameron Mitchell"	TBA	TBA
207	"Aldea Everydea"	TBA	TBA
208	"Masterqueef Theatre"	TBA	TBA
209	"Adewale Akinnuoye-Agbaje"	TBA	TBA
210	"Michael-Leon Wooley"	TBA	TBA
211	"Marc Singer (The Beastmaster)"	TBA	TBA
212	"Jeffrey Bowyer-Chapman"	TBA	TBA
213	"Diane Warren"	TBA	TBA
214	"The L Word"	TBA	TBA
215	"Nile Rodgers"	TBA	TBA
216	"Whitney Cummings"	TBA	TBA
217	"Oklahummus"	TBA	TBA
218	"Adrienne Barbeau"	TBA	TBA
219	"Rujacking"	TBA	TBA
220	"Sean Hayes"	TBA	TBA
221	"Kate Moennig"	TBA	TBA
222	"Rachel Bloom"	TBA	TBA
223	"Allee Willis"	TBA	TBA
224	"Char Margolis (Psychic"	TBA	TBA
225	"Alan Carr & Graham Norton"	TBA	TBA
226	"Andrew Garfield & Maisie Williams"	TBA	TBA
227	"Dame Twiggy"	TBA	TBA
228	"Geri Halliwell (Ginger Spice)"	TBA	TBA
229	"Jade Thirlwall (Little Mix)"	TBA	TBA
230	"Cheryl"	TBA	TBA
231	"Michaela Coel"	TBA	TBA
232	"Tia Carrere"	TBA	TBA
233	"Adam Shankman"	TBA	TBA
234	"Izzy G (AJ and the Queen"	TBA	TBA
235	"Katya Returns"	TBA	TBA
236	"Kevin Daniels"	TBA	TBA
237	"Raven Returns"	TBA	TBA
238	"Ru and Michelle are Ru-united"	TBA	TBA
239	"Matt Rogers (Las Culturistas)"	TBA	TBA
241	"Mary Kay Place"	TBA	TBA
241	"Natasha Leggero"	TBA	TBA
242	"Isaac Mizrahi"	TBA	TBA
243	"Charles Blow"	TBA	TBA
244	"Michelle with the Good Knee"	TBA	TBA
245	"Nicki Minaj & Leslie Jones"	TBA	TBA
246	"Robyn & Normani"	TBA	TBA
247	"Chaka Khan & Whoopi Goldberg"	TBA	TBA
248	"Daisy Ridley & Jeff Goldblum"	TBA	TBA

== Reception ==
Noisey stated, "Honestly, this podcast slays the podcast game. After one hour of listening to RuPaul and Michelle Visage chat about sex, drugs, mental health, musicals, drag queens, Hollywood and the infinite wisdom of Judge Judy, you will feel as if your life is an empty vortex of nothingness when they are not making sounds into your ears."

Hornet stated "Any Drag Race fan knows that if they want the scoop, they should listen to What's the Tee?"

RuPaul: What's the Tee? won a Webby Award for Best Host in 2018, with both RuPaul and Visage being listed. In 2017 and 2019 the podcast won the WOWIE Award for Best Podcast. In 2020 the podcast was the runner-up for the Queerty Award in the Podcast category.
