= Diamond Crowned Queen =

Single by Raja
- Released: May 3, 2011
- Genre: Neo-pop
- Length: 3:51
- Label: Citrusonic Flavor Recordings
- Songwriters: Raja; Anthony Garza; Eddie Amador; Josh Peace
- Producers: Eddie Amador; Josh Peace

Raja singles chronology
"Diamond Crowned Queen" (2011)	"Sublime" (2012)

"Diamond Crowned Queen" is a song recorded by American drag queen Raja, which was released on May 3, 2011, through the record label Citrusonic Flavor Recordings. This was shortly after they were crowned winner of the third season of the reality competition series RuPaul's Drag Race. Raja and Anthony Garza wrote the single in collaboration with its producers Eddie Amador and Josh Peace. Raja said that they recorded the song due to the close connection between drag and music and their desire to experiment in the medium. Backed by an electronic beat, it is a neo-pop track with lyrics revolving around sexuality. The song was noted by music critics for its combination of pop music, techno, and electro music.

Critical response to "Diamond Crowned Queen" was mixed. Although its composition divided music critics, these commentators generally agreed that the song is one of the better tracks released by a RuPaul's Drag Race alumni. The single peaked at number 35 on the Billboard Hot Dance Club Songs chart, making Raja the only RuPaul's Drag Race season three contestant to appear on a Billboard chart. Austin Young directed the song's music video, which featured Raja in various outfits both in and out of drag. American drag queen Raven makes a cameo appearance in the video. It received positive attention from media commentators for its style and Raven's inclusion. To further promote the single, two remix extended plays (EPs) were released and Raja performed it on the RuPaul's Drag Race tour.

== Background and composition ==
"Diamond Crowned Queen"
"Diamond Crowned Queen" is a neo-pop song with influences from pop, techno, and electro music. Critics have described Raja's vocals as a "whole lot of groaning" and "crazy shit shouted to a beat".

After winning the third season of RuPaul's Drag Race, Raja released his debut single "Diamond Crowned Queen" on May 3, 2011, through the record label Citrusonic Flavor Recordings. It was the first single from the record company. Disc jockeys Eddie Amador and Josh Peace produced the three-minute, 51-second track, which features Raja singing a "a series of boasts" over an electronic beat. It was written by Raja and Anthony Garza in collaboration with its producers Amador and Peace.

Raja said that he recorded a single as he felt that music was closely connected to drag, explaining: "[I]n this day and age, it’s like everybody has to put out a song. It’s kind of the next step: You were on a reality show, now you have to put out a song." He said that he felt a personal connection with the recording process as he had "[his] own soundtrack to [his] life that [he] play[s] everyday". During an interview, he also described the single as a part of his experimentation with music.

Adem Ali of Forté Magazine identified the song, along with Raja's subsequent releases, as exemplifying the singer's "blend of club-kid neo-pop" combining elements of pop, techno, and electro music. Raja said that his music was inspired by electro house and disco. "Diamond Crowned Queen" was called a "grungy dance mix" by WEHOVille's Whitney Friedlander. The instrumental is provided by "deep, throbbing beats" and electronics. Rolling Stone's Lyndsey Parker described Raja's vocal performance as a "whole lot of groaning", and Bustle's Anneliese Cooper classified it as an example of "crazy shit shouted to a beat". In the chorus, Raja sings "Follow me, follow me, I’m a diamond crowned queen. Come with me, to my pretty, pretty palace, Gonna lick on your trigger, every inch will make you quiver." Other lyrics include other sexual references, such as: "S-E-X, sex for dinner / I'm a thunder-breathing dragon cat."

== Reception ==
"Diamond Crowned Queen" received mixed reviews from music critics on its release. Lyndsey Parker listed it as one of the eight listenable singles by a RuPaul's Drag Race contestant, describing it as "a deliciously trashy track". Comparing the song to The Normal's "Warm Leatherette" (1978), Parker wrote that "Diamond Crowned Queen" contained elements of "'70s sleazefeasts [...] '80s industrial, and mid-'90s house music". It was also positively received by Anneliese Cooper, who said it left her "gagging" noting its lyrics "will win my heart, every time". Patrick of Homorazzi.com described the song's chorus as "[d]irty and hot". While writing for Yahoo! Music, Parker included the single on her list of the seven "actually great singles" by RuPaul's Drag Race contestants. She described it as one of eight "listenable" singles released by the show's participants. FemaleFirst's Daniel Falconer agreed with Parker, placing the song on his list of the best music to come out of the reality television show.

Several media commentators were divided on the single's composition. In his review of Raja's entire music catalog, Adem Ali observed that his sound was "an acquired taste". Bradley Stern of MuuMuse wrote that the song was too "erratic for [his] taste", but was more positive to the remix done by Prince Vince. Stern described the remix as "nothing but pure sweat and sex (for dinner!)". The Dallas Voice's Rich Lopez wrote that the song lacked a strong or memorable hook, but appreciated Raja's decision to experiment with music. He compared it to the early work of Nine Inch Nails and Jeffree Star. Stacy Lambe of BuzzFeed described the single as "unexpectedly more gothic" than fellow drag queen Sharon Needles' music and "club-friendly", but criticized the lyrics as a "hodgepodge of boasts". The single was poorly received by Mark Blankenship of NewNowNext.com, who felt it suffered from a "sludgy club beat".

"Diamond Crowned Queen" debuted at number fifty on the Billboard Hot Dance Club Songs chart on the week of July 2, 2011. The single peaked at number 35, remaining on the chart for six weeks. It was the only song released by a RuPaul's Drag Race season three contestant to appear on a Billboard chart.

== Promotion and music video ==
The cameo appearance from Raven (pictured on the left) was praised by critics.

During a press release after the single's debut, Raja said that he planned to perform it while serving as a headliner on the RuPaul's Drag Race tour. Two remix extended plays (EPs) were released on June 28, 2011, and July 12, 2011. Raja positively responded to Peace's remix, saying that "[he] wish [he]’d made it [his] original" and he regularly lip-syncs it on tour.

A music video, directed by Austin Young, for the original version of the song premiered on June 17, 2011. Raja is shown performing the single in various risqué outfits, such as a pair of white sunglasses and a leopard print body suit. He also appears outside his drag persona. He is seen wearing clown masks and wigs made from plastic and later kissing drag queen Raven.

The music video received mostly positive feedback from media commentators. Patrick of Homorazzi.com described the video as a mixture of Lady Gaga, Marilyn Manson, and singer Peter Breeze. It was praised by Mark Blankenship as one of the three fiercest releases by a RuPaul's Drag Race contestant, describing Raja's fashion as "slutty-fabulous". He commended Raja for "challenging us to look, to lust, and then deal with it when shit gets crazy". Stacy Lambe positively responded to the video, calling it "a mix of amazing visuals with a fun, hardcore dance beat". Rich Lopez criticized Raja's decision to appear without drag as breaking the illusion, but he also wrote that "Raja creates striking looks that are easy to stare at."

Raven's cameo appearance was identified as one of the music video's highlights by Jjannise of Out and a writer from Queer Me Up. Jjannise of Out felt both repulsed and attracted by the image of Raven "[p]ainted like Raja's Leather Drag Barbie twin and gazing blankly at the camera". A writer for Queer Me Up wrote that Raven's inclusion turned the video into "[t]he ultimate Drag Queen Extrvaganza!", referencing him as "the magnificent Raven".

== Track listings ==
Digital download
No.	Title	Length
1.	"Diamond Crowned Queen" (Original)	3:51

Remixes, Pt. 1
No.	Title	Length
1.	"Diamond Crowned Queen" (DJ Irene Sex Express Remix)	8:19
2.	"Diamond Crowned Queen" (Ian Nieman Club)	6:07
3.	"Diamond Crowned Queen" (Prince Vince Remix)	5:46
4.	"Diamond Crowned Queen" (Timmy Loop's Night Disco Remix)	5:04
5.	"Diamond Crowned Queen" (Automatic Panic Crowned King Remix)	6:22
6.	"Diamond Crowned Queen" (Tom Napack Club)	6:59
7.	"Diamond Crowned Queen" (IGomi Remix)	4:46
8.	"Diamond Crowned Queen" (Prince Vince Edit)	4:32
9.	"Diamond Crowned Queen" (Tom Napack Radio)	3:39

Remixes, Pt. 2
No.	Title	Length
1.	"Diamond Crowned Queen" (Josh Peace Remix)	5:52
2.	"Diamond Crowned Queen" (Eddie Amador's QueenWurk Dub)	8:05
3.	"Diamond Crowned Queen" (Casey Alva Vox Dub)	7:08
4.	"Diamond Crowned Queen" (Automatic Panic Crowned King Dub)	6:30
5.	"Diamond Crowned Queen" (DJ Irene Long Live The Queen Dub)	6:51
6.	"Diamond Crowned Queen" (Gomi Dub)	4:46
7.	"Diamond Crowned Queen" (Ian Nieman Dub)	6:13
8.	"Diamond Crowned Queen" (Prince Vince Dub Mix)	6:25
9.	"Diamond Crowned Queen" (Tom Napack Dub)	7:02
10.	"Diamond Crowned Queen" (Tommy Loop's Prime Rib Dub)	5:18

== Credits and personnel ==
Credits adapted from a PR Newswire article on "Diamond Crown Queen".

Management

- Citrusonic Flavor Recordings

Personnel

- Lyrics By – Raja, Anthony Garza, Eddie Amador, Josh Peace
- Produced By – Eddie Amador, Josh Peace

== Charts ==
Chart (2011)	Peak position
US Hot Dance Club Songs (Billboard)	35
