= Fashion Photo RuView =

American web series

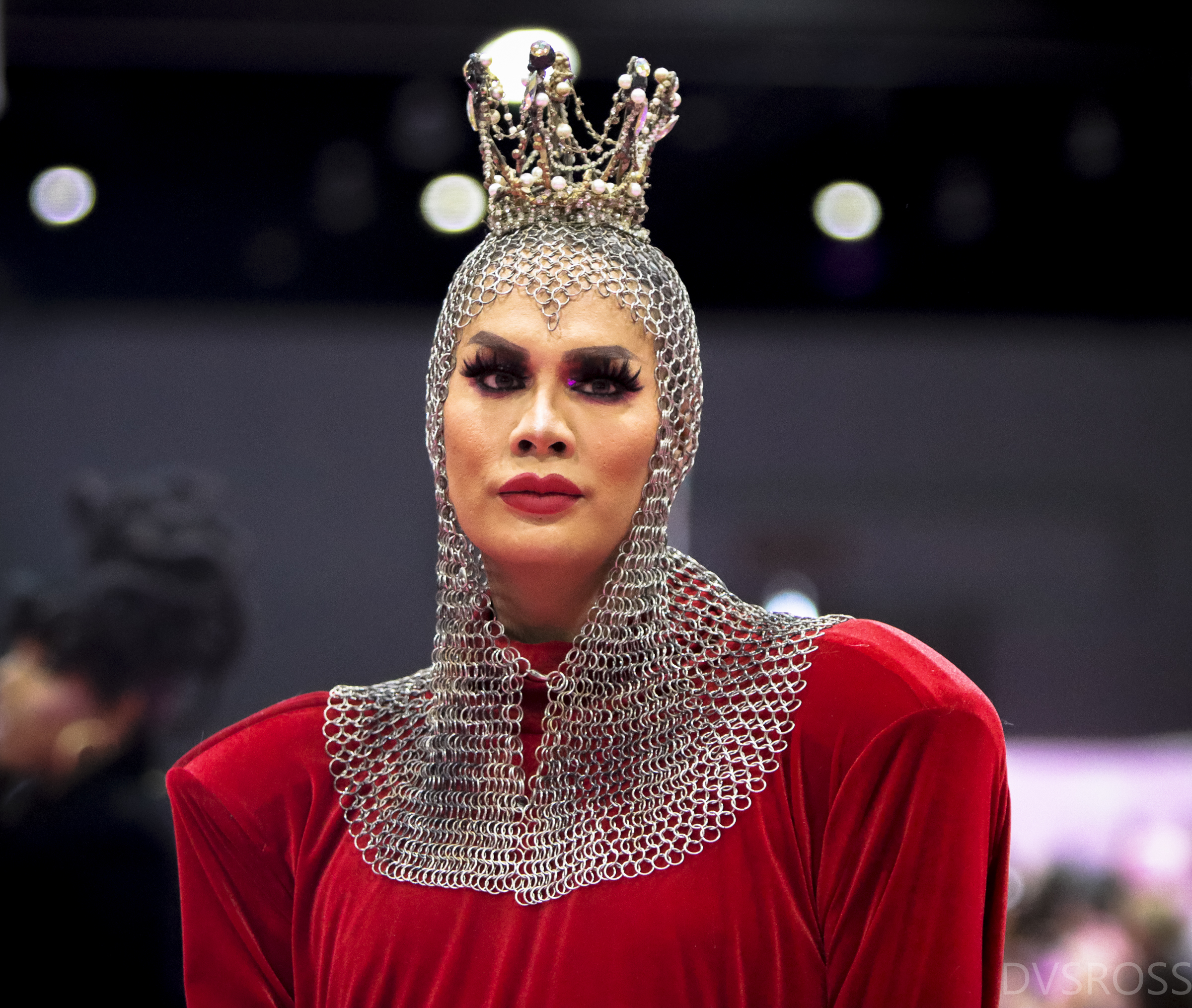
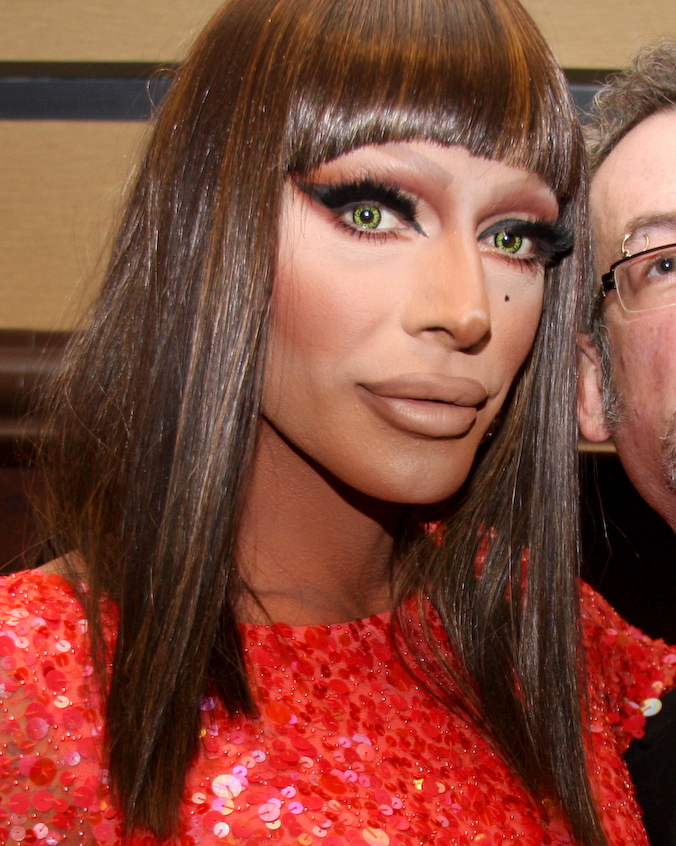
Regular hosts Raja (top) and Raven (bottom).

Fashion Photo RuView is a weekly YouTube series by WOW Presents Plus which premiered in 2014. Hosted by former contestants Raja and Raven, the show sees the duo critique runway looks presented on the reality series RuPaul's Drag Race and its various iterations. Paper magazine has said the series "has become an influential cultural entity unto itself". It has been nominated for an Astra TV Award.

== Legacy ==
The language of Fashion Photo RuView entered the main series itself during the reading mini-challenge in the seventh season of RuPaul's Drag Race All Stars. Host Raja returned to compete on this season, and her castmate Trinity the Tuck read her with the line: "Raja, boot".

On December 31, 2015, an episode of Fashion Photo RuView guest hosted by season 7 contestants Trixie Mattel and Katya Zamolodchikova was uploaded in which the duo reviewed outfits Raja and Raven wore on previous episodes of Fashion Photo RuView. Fans responded very positively to the duo's chemistry, which led to World of Wonder commissioning UNHhhh starring Mattel and Zamolodchikova. The success of this series established Trixie and Katya as a successful double act and led to numerous further creative endeavors between them.
