= Raven (drag queen) =

American drag queen and television personality

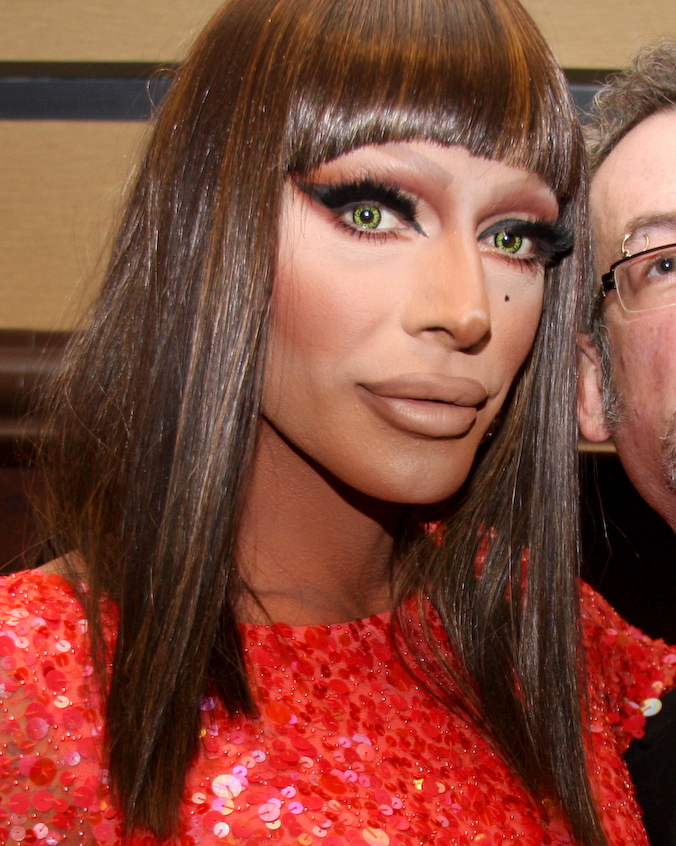
- Raven at the 23rd GLAAD Media Awards, 2012
- Born: David Petruschin; April 8, 1979 (age 47); Rexburg, Idaho, U.S.
- Occupations: Drag queen Television personality Make-up artist Creative producer
- Years active: 2002–present

David Petruschin (born April 8, 1979), best known as Raven, is an American drag queen, make-up artist, and reality television personality from Riverside, California. Raven was a fixture in the Southern California nightclub scene before gaining international prominence for appearing in both the second season of RuPaul's Drag Race and the first season of All Stars. She is the runner-up of both season 2 and of All Stars 1. In 2026 she returned as part of Drag Race Down Under vs. the World. She arrived as a contestant and competed in episode 1, but was revealed as a guest judge in episode 2. Petruschin has been RuPaul's makeup artist since Drag Race's ninth season (episode 3) and has since become a creative producer of both RuPaul’s Drag Race and RuPaul’s Drag Race All Stars. For his make-up work on the show, Petruschin received the Primetime Emmy Award for Outstanding Makeup for a Multi-Camera Series or Special (Non-Prosthetic) in 2020.

== Early life ==
Petruschin was born to DeShawna and Viktor Petruschin in Rexburg, Idaho as the first of three children. He is of Russian ancestry. His mother, who separated from his father when he was seven years old, raised him as Mormon. She grew up in Victorville, California.

== Career ==
Before becoming a drag artist, Petruschin worked as a cosmetics salesperson and a freelance make-up artist for local theater productions during the day, moonlighting in nightclubs as a go-go boy under the name "Phoenix". His drag debut as Raven was on May 10, 2002, performing with fellow future Drag Race alumnus Mayhem Miller. Petruschin did not have a drag mother. As Raven, Petruschin auditioned to compete on the first and second seasons of RuPaul's Drag Race.

=== Early Drag Race appearances ===
In 2010, Raven was announced as a contestant on the second season of RuPaul's Drag Race. In the first episode, she won the season's first mini-challenge, a photo shoot. In the second and third episode she landed in the bottom two, having to "lip-sync for her life" twice in order to stay in the competition. She won both lip-syncs. Raven won a second mini-challenge in the fourth episode by guessing the price of various objects, earning her a phone call home; and a third mini-challenge in the fifth episode by successfully decorating a box to reflect his personal style. She won the seventh and eighth main challenges, which involved creating and promoting an autobiography, and giving an older gentleman a makeover, respectively. She finished in second place at the end of the season.

Raven appeared in the spin-off series RuPaul's Drag U, which ran for three seasons. Raven served as a "drag professor" and mentor to female contestants who are given make-overs. In the series, his persona is not portrayed in a villainous fashion, but instead as a softer and nurturing mentor. Raven made a total of twelve appearances and collected the most wins during the series' run, being dubbed the "Makeover Queen". In an episode of the second season he gave his mother DeShawna a makeover, helping him win against the sisters of Jujubee and Manila Luzon.

On August 6, 2012, Raven was announced as one of twelve past Drag Race contestants selected for RuPaul's Drag Race: All Stars, which premiered on the Logo network on October 22, 2012. He was paired with contestant and best friend Jujubee to form Team Rujubee. They won the mini-challenges in the second and fifth episode by correctly answering questions about each other in the style of The Newlywed Game and by scoring more points in a game of basketball, which won them a call to their loved ones. The duo reached the final, which aired on November 26, 2012, where Raven again landed as a runner-up, this time to winner Chad Michaels.

During the airing of the first All Stars season, Raven (along with All Stars contestants Manila Luzon, Latrice Royale, and Tammie Brown) appeared in a television commercial for travel website Orbitz's new portal for LGBT leisure travel.

=== Post All-Stars work ===
Petruschin returned to Drag Race off-camera as RuPaul's make-up artist, beginning with the ninth season. He received a nomination for the 2018 Make-Up Artists and Hair Stylists Guild Award in the category "Television and New Media Series: Best Contemporary Makeup". For his work on the tenth season, he received a nomination for the 70th Primetime Emmy Awards in the category Outstanding Makeup for a Multi-Camera Series or Special. He won an Emmy for his work on the twelfth season. Aside from doing RuPaul's make-up, she has served as a creative producer for All Stars since its third season and for Drag Race since its tenth.

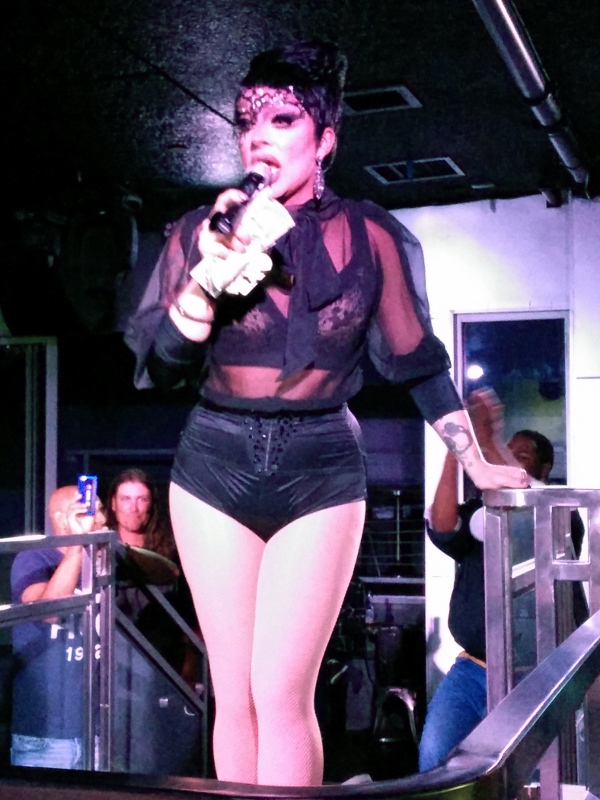
Raven performing "Imagine It Was Us" by Jessie Ware

In a commercial promoting the syndication run of the cable television series Nip/Tuck on the Logo network, Raven lip synced to the theme song "A Perfect Lie" as she caressed a syringe close to her lips. The commercial was based on one of her past drag performances. She has also made a guest appearance in an episode of Logo's reality series, Pretty Hurts, which documents the life and career of celebrity medical aesthetician Rand Rusher.

Raven appeared in an episode of America's Next Top Model, Cycle 8, during a photo shoot where each of the show's contestants dressed in male drag and paired with a drag queen.

Raven made a cameo in the 2011 music video for "Diamond Crowned Queen" by RuPaul's Drag Race season three winner Raja. His cameo was praised by critics, who named her the "magnificent Raven". In 2012, along with other RuPaul's Drag Race contestants, she appeared in another music video, "Queen" by Mimi Imfurst's band Xelle. He also starred in the music video "Feed Me Diamonds" by MNDR.

In 2014, Raven and Raja started a weekly YouTube fashion critique show on World of Wonder's channel called "Fashion Photo RuView", where they discuss fashion from mostly Drag Race alumni. He has appeared on multiple other WOW shows as well.

Focusing his efforts on film projects, Petruschin currently rarely performs in live drag shows.

== Legacy ==
In 2016, Raven was included as an inspiration in Vanity Fair's "100 Years of Drag Fashion" video, alongside iconic drag performers Divine, David Bowie, and RuPaul. The video presented his style as the epitome of 2000s-era drag. Raven is widely cited as creating the “face of drag”, even inspiring RuPaul's original make-up artist, Mathu Andersen. RuPaul's Drag Race season six winner Bianca Del Rio has also stated that many young drag queens use Raven's style.

== Filmography ==
=== Film ===
Year	Title	Role
2021	The Bitch Who Stole Christmas	Shopping Lady

=== Television ===
Year	Title	Role	Notes
2007	America's Next Top Model	Raven	Cameo
2010	RuPaul's Drag Race (season 2)	Contestant	Runner-up
2010, 2012	RuPaul's Drag Race: Untucked	Raven	
2010–2012	RuPaul's Drag U	Himself/Professor	
2011	RuPaul's Drag Race (season 3)	Raven	Special guest
2012	RuPaul's Drag Race (season 4)	Raven	Cameo
2012	RuPaul's Drag Race All Stars (season 1)	Contestant	Runner-up
2012	The Soup	Cora Crawley, Countess of Grantham	Episode: "Episode 9.7"
2016	RuPaul's Drag Race All Stars (season 2)	Raven	Snatch Game Contestant
2019	RuPaul's Drag Race UK (series 1)	Raven	Special guest
2020	RuPaul's Drag Race (season 12)	Raven	3 episodes
2020	Celebrity Family Feud	Raven	Guest contestant
2021	RuPaul's Drag Race UK (series 2)	Raven	Special guest
2021	RuPaul's Drag Race (season 13)	Raven	Snatch Game Contestant
2021	RuPaul's Drag Race Down Under (season 1)	Raven	Special guest
2021	RuPaul's Drag Race UK (series 3)	Raven	Special guest
2021–2023	Painted with Raven	Host/Judge	
2022	RuPaul's Drag Race (season 14)	Raven	Snatch Game Contestant
2022	RuPaul's Drag Race All Stars (season 7)	Raven	Special guest
2022	RuPaul's Drag Race Down Under (season 2)	Raven	Snatch Game Contestant
2022	RuPaul's Drag Race UK (series 4)	Raven	Guest judge
2023	RuPaul's Drag Race All Stars (season 8)	Raven	Special guest
2023	RuPaul's Drag Race Down Under (season 3)	Raven	Special guest
2023	RuPaul's Drag Race UK (series 5)	Raven	Special guest
2024	RuPaul's Drag Race: UK vs. the World (series 2)	Raven	Special guest
2024	RuPaul's Drag Race All Stars (season 9)	Raven	Special guest
2024	RuPaul's Drag Race UK (series 6)	Raven	Special guest
2025	RuPaul's Drag Race All Stars (season 10)	Raven	Snatch Game Contestant
2025	RuPaul's Drag Race UK (series 7)	Raven	Special guest
2026	RuPaul's Drag Race: UK vs. the World (series 3)	Raven	Special guest
2026	Drag Race Down Under vs. the World	Mole/Guest Judge	Originally announced as a participating contestant
2026	RuPaul's Drag Race UK (series 8)	Raven	Special guest

=== Web ===
Year	Title	Role	Notes	Ref.
2013	World of Wonder Game Show	Himself	Winner	
2013	Ring My Bell	Himself	Guest	
2013–2015	James St. James' Transformations	Himself	Guest	
2014–2017	Be$tie$/Couple$ for Ca$h	Himself/Raven	Guest	
2014–present	Fashion Photo RuView	Raven	Co-host with Raja	
2016	Hot T	Raven	S2 Episode 7–8	
2018	M.U.G.	Raven	Guest Co-Host	
2019	Wet n Wild	Raven	World of Wonder mini-series	
2020	Fashion Photo RuView: STFH Edition	Raven	Co-host	

=== Music videos ===
Year	Title	Artist
2011	Diamond Crowned Queen	Raja
2012	Responsitrannity	RuPaul
2012	Queen	Xelle
2012	Feed Me Diamonds	MNDR
2014	Animal	Berlin

== Awards and nominations ==
Year	Award	Category	Nominee(s)	Result	Ref.
2018	Make-Up Artists and Hair Stylists Guild Awards	Best Contemporary Makeup in Television and New Media Series	RuPaul's Drag Race	Nominated	
2022	Make-Up Artists and Hair Stylists Guild Awards	Best Contemporary Makeup in Television and New Media Series	RuPaul's Drag Race	Nominated	
2018	Primetime Emmy Awards	Outstanding Makeup for a Multi-Camera Series or Special	RuPaul's Drag Race (season 10)	Nominated	
2020	Primetime Emmy Awards	Outstanding Contemporary Makeup for a Variety, Nonfiction or Reality Program	RuPaul's Drag Race (season 12)	Won	
2021	Primetime Emmy Awards	Outstanding Contemporary Makeup for a Variety, Nonfiction or Reality Program	RuPaul's Drag Race (season 13)	Nominated	
2025	Primetime Emmy Awards	Outstanding Contemporary Makeup for a Variety, Nonfiction or Reality Program	RuPaul's Drag Race (season 17)	Nominated	
