= Raja Gemini =

American drag performer and make-up artist

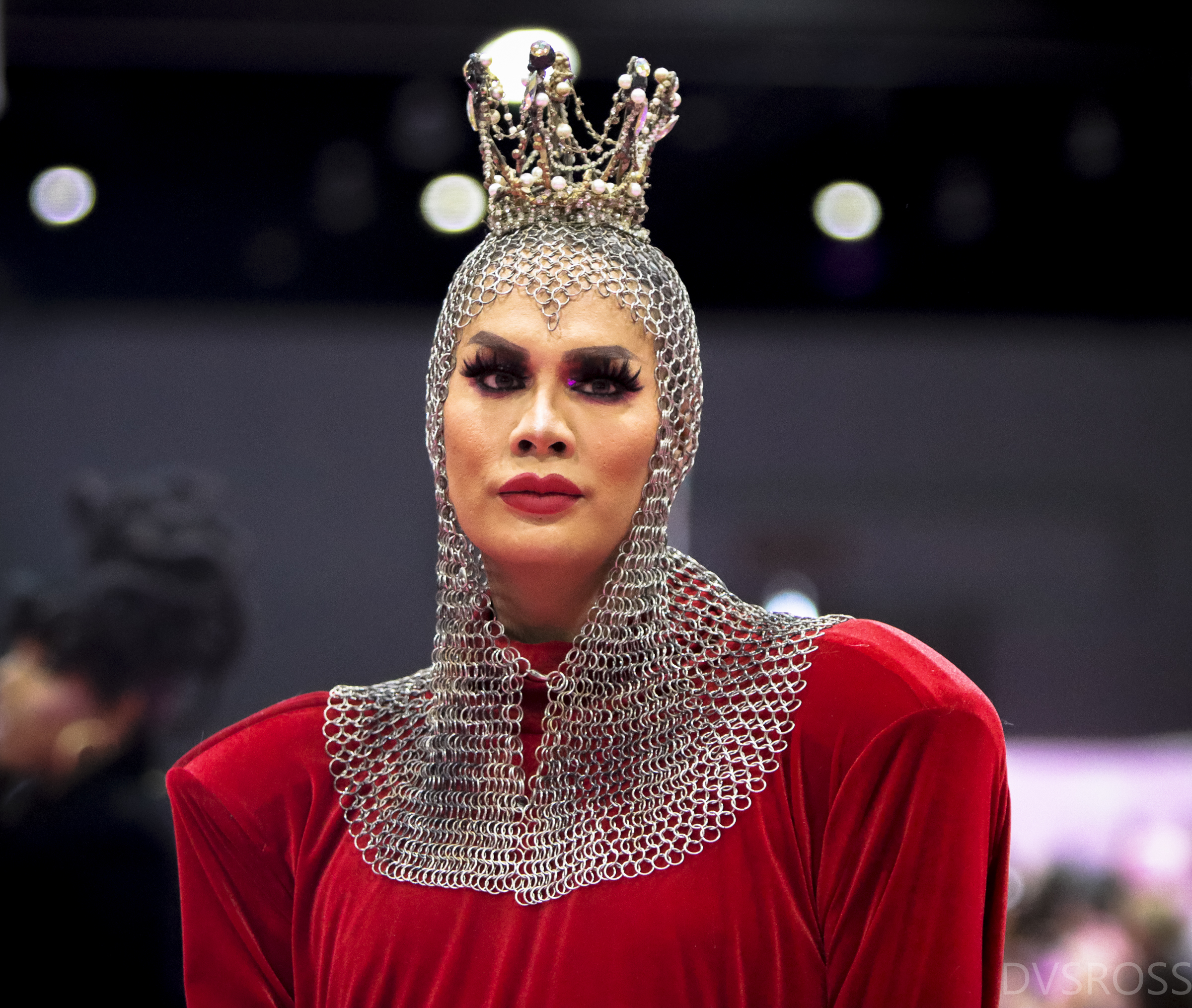
- Raja at the 2022 RuPaul's DragCon LA
- Born: Sutan Ibrahim Karim Amrullah; June 14, 1974 (age 52); Baldwin Park, California, U.S.
- Other names: Raja; Sutan Amrull; Crayola
- Education: California State University, Fullerton
- Occupations: Make-up artist drag queen Television personality Recording Artist
- Years active: 1990–present
- Known for: RuPaul's Drag Race (season 3) RuPaul's Drag Race All Stars (season 7)
- Height: 190 cm (6 ft 3 in)
- Spouse: Ryan Turner (m. 2017; div. 2020)
- Relatives: Willy Amrull (father); Hamka (half-uncle)
- Website: https://rajagemini.com

Sutan Ibrahim Karim Amrullah ([ˌsutan iˌbrahɪm ˌkarɪm amˈrula]; born June 14, 1974), often shortened to Sutan Amrull, is an American drag queen and make-up artist who also goes by the stage name Raja Gemini or simply Raja. They are best known for winning the third season of RuPaul's Drag Race. Amrullah later returned to compete on the seventh season of RuPaul's Drag Race All Stars, an all-winners season, where they won the title "Queen Of She Done Already Done Had Herses". Outside of drag, Amrullah is also known for their makeup artistry on the reality television show America's Next Top Model (cycles four through twelve). Amrullah's clients include Tyra Banks, Dita von Teese, Pamela Anderson, Paulina Porizkova, Iman, Iggy Azalea, RuPaul, and Twiggy. Since 2009, Amrullah has been make-up artist to singer Adam Lambert for print media, live U.S. appearances, and Lambert's international 2010 Glam Nation Tour.

Amrullah previously co-hosted the podcast Very That alongside Delta Work.

== Early life ==
Amrullah was born in Baldwin Park, California. They are of Dutch and Indonesian descent. Their father, Abdul Wadud Karim Amrullah, was the younger brother of Indonesian ʿālim and philosopher Hamka. When they were three, their family moved to the island of Bali in Indonesia, their parents' native country, where they stayed for six years before returning to the U.S. They grew up in La Puente, California and went to high school at Bassett High School in nearby Bassett, California.

== Career ==
=== Career beginnings ===
At sixteen years of age, Amrullah got into the drag scene by attending L.A. nightclubs with friends. They were part of a sector of drag that was inspired by the goth and punk subcultures. The first few years of their drag career in the early 1990s were spent as a club kid named Crayola.

Amrullah attended California State University, Fullerton as an art student, focusing on art direction and illustration, for two years, then decided to pursue a career in makeup artistry and female impersonation.

Amrullah's first drag performance was in 1991 at Mills College performing "Groove Is In The Heart" by Deee-Lite.

=== RuPaul's Drag Race ===
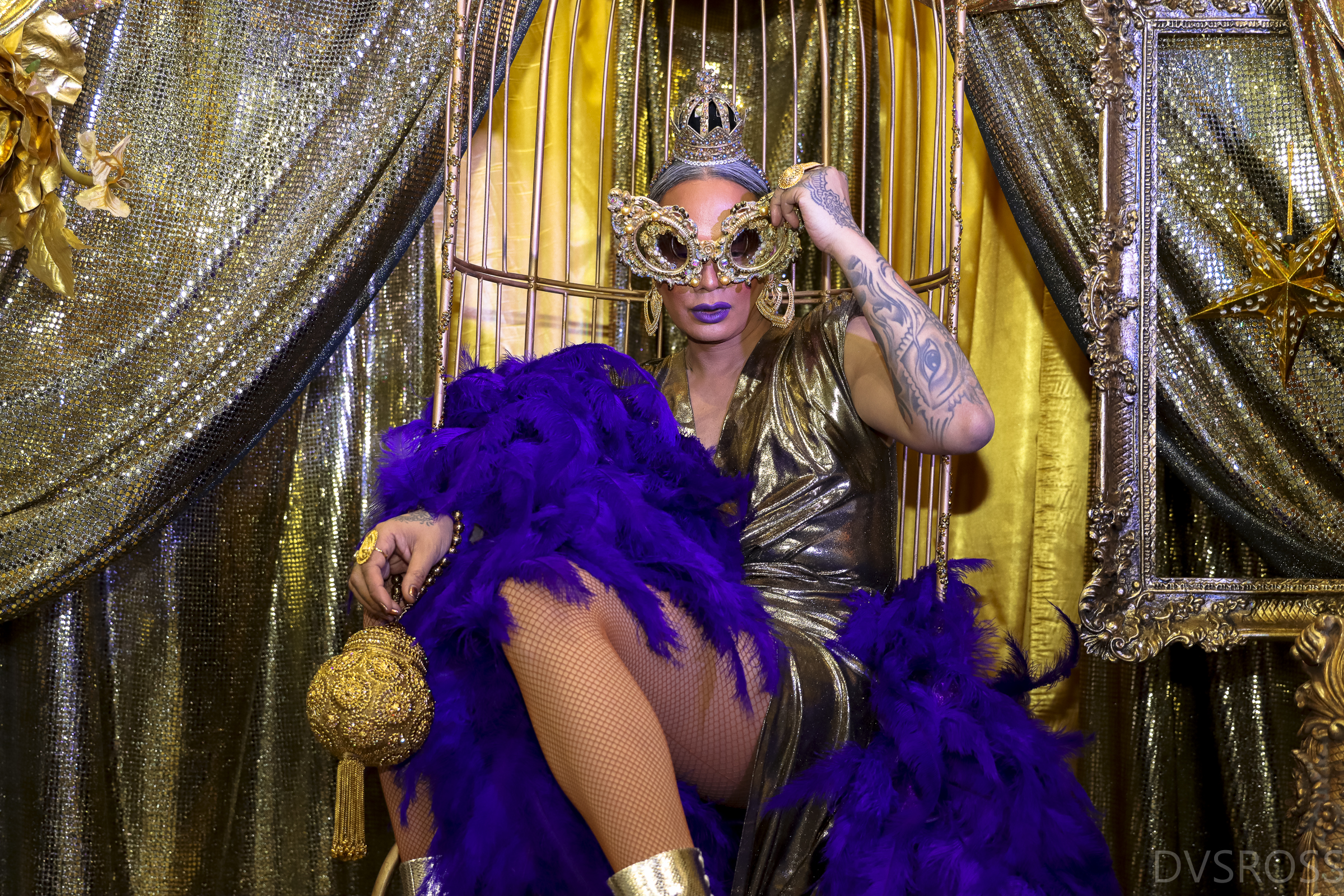
Raja at their RuPaul's DragCon LA booth in 2022

They were a contestant on the third season of RuPaul's Drag Race as Raja. They were a member of the "Heathers" clique, which took its name from the popular cult film Heathers. In the final episode, after a lip-sync battle with Manila Luzon, Raja was declared the winner of the show's third season and crowned America's Next Drag Superstar. As part of their duties as the third-season winner of Drag Race, Amrullah toured the U.S. and Canada on Logo's Drag Race Tour in 2011.

In 2014, Raja joined the Drag Race Battle of the Seasons tour where they performed a lip-sync duet with Manila Luzon to the Babymetal song "Gimme Chocolate!!"

In April 2022, Raja was announced as one of the eight returning winners that would be competing in seventh season of RuPaul's Drag Race All Stars, the first ever all-winners season of Drag Race. They won the title of "Queen of She Done Already Done Had Herses" and a prize of $50,000.

=== Other ventures ===
Amrullah was a make up artist on America's Next Top Model from 2005 until 2009.

In May 2011, Amrullah released their first single as Raja, titled "Diamond Crowned Queen". The single debuted at number fifty on the Billboard Hot Dance Club Songs, before peaking at number thirty-five. On August 21, 2012, their second single "Sublime" was released. Their third single, "Zubi Zubi Zubi" (roughly translating to "Dance Dance Dance"), was released June 1, 2013.

Since 2014, they have presented the weekly WOWPresents YouTube series Fashion Photo RuView with fellow Drag Race alumna Raven.

In February 2017, they starred as an intergalactic creature in the music video for Blondie's single "Fun". They also appeared in the "Make Love Not Walls" Diesel campaign directed by David LaChapelle and in a campaign for Urban Decay alongside fellow Drag Race alumni Alaska, Jiggly Caliente, and Katya.

Amrullah has created and performed live drag shows as Raja in Provincetown, Massachusetts, such as Gawdess (2017), Masque (2018), and Lush Life (2019).

Amrullah guest starred as themself in The Simpsons episode "Werking Mom", which aired on November 18, 2018. In June 2019, they were one of 37 queens to be featured on the cover of New York Magazine.

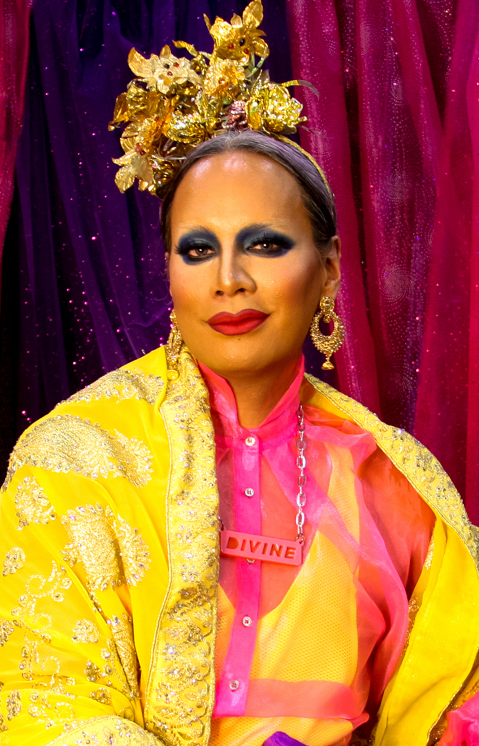
Raja at RuPaul's DragCon LA, 2019

== Personal life ==
On December 14, 2017, Amrullah married Ryan Turner at a small ceremony at City Hall in Norwalk, California. They are now separated.

In January 2023, Amrullah came out as non-binary, stating they use they/them pronouns.

== Discography ==
=== Singles ===
List of singles, with selected details and chart positions
Title	Year	Peak chart position
Title	Year	US Dance
"Diamond Crowned Queen"	2011	35
"Sublime"	2012	—
"Zubi Zubi Zubi"	2013	—
"Cholita"	2015	—
"Divine"	2017	—
"Moodbored"	2019	—
"—" denotes a recording that did not chart or was not released in that territory.

==== As featured artist ====
List of featured singles
Title	Year
"Legends" (Cast Version) (RuPaul featuring the cast of RuPaul's Drag Race All Stars, season 7)	2022
"Titanic" (MSTR) (with the cast of RuPaul's Drag Race All Stars, season 7)	2022

=== Other appearances ===
Title	Year	Other Artist(s)	Album
"Lady Marmalade"	2014	Raja, Delta Work, Manila Luzon and Carmen Carrera (as The Heathers)	Non-album single

== Filmography ==
=== Film ===
Year	Title	Role	Notes
1995	Strange Days	Club Goer	Uncredited
2000	Angels!	Tawngy Davis	
2008	The Young and Evil	Maxie	Short
2015	TupiniQueens	Themself	Documentary
2015	Hush Up Sweet Charlotte	Reporter	
2025	Dear Viv	Themself	Documentary

=== Television ===
Year	Title	Role	Notes	Ref
2002	The Anna Nicole Show	Themself	Season 1, Episode 11	
2005-2009	America's Next Top Model	Themself	Make Up Department	
2011	RuPaul's Drag Race (season 3)	Themself / Contestant	Winner	
2011	RuPaul's Drag Race: Untucked (season 3)	Themself / Contestant		
2012	RuPaul's Drag Race (season 4)	Themself	Episode 13: "The Final Three" – Guest	
2012	RuPaul's Drag U	Themself / Professor		
2013	NewNowNext Awards	Themself		
2016	RuPaul's Drag Race (season 8)	Themself	Episode 1: "Keeping It 100!" (100th episode) – Guest	
2016	RuPaul's Drag Race (season 8)	Themself	Episode 10: "Grand Finale" – Guest	
2018	The Simpsons (season 30)	Themself	Episode 7: "Werking Mom"	
2018	The Browns	Themself	Guest appearance	
2019	RuPaul's Drag Race (season 11)	Themself	Episode 1: "Whatcha Unpackin?" – Guest	
2021	Painted with Raven	Themself	Guest judge (1 episode)	
2022	The Kelly Clarkson Show	Themself	Guest	
2022	RuPaul's Drag Race All Stars (season 7)	Themself	Contestant	
2022	RuPaul's Drag Race All Stars: Untucked (season 7)	Themself	Contestant	
2022	Countdown to All Stars 7: You’re a Winner Baby	Themself	VH1 special	
2022	The View	Themself	Guest	
2023	Drag Me to Dinner	Themself	Hulu original	
2024	Tongue Thai'd	Themself	Episode: "Raja at Crispy Pork Gang"	
2025	RuPaul's Drag Race All Stars (season 10)	Themself	Episode 10: "Tournament of All Stars Snatch Game" - Guest	

=== Web ===
Year	Title	Role	Notes	Ref.
2013	Ring My Bell	Themself	Guest	
2013	SubCultures: Drag Queens feat. Raja Gemini & Vicky Vox	Themself	By SoulPancake	
2014 –present	Fashion Photo RuView	Themself	Co host with Raven	
2014	Paint Me Bitch	Themself	Episode: "Sutan Amrull"	
2015	Raja Drawja	Themself	Host	
2015	Hey Qween!	Themself	Episode: "Raja"	
2015	Olivia Culpo is Transformed into Farrah Fawcett by Make-up Artist Raja	Themself	By Refinery29	
2016	100 Years of Drag Queen Fashion	Themself	By Vanity Fair	
2017 - 2023	The Pit Stop	Themself	Host; Guest (S15)	
2019	Reading Queens	Themself	Guest	
2019	Hey Qween!	Themself	Episode: "Raja on the Hey Qween Halloween Special"	
2019	Puff Puff Sessions	Themself	Guest	
2020	Working Out Is a Drag	Themself	Guest	
2021	Wanna Be On Top?	Themself	Podcast, guest	
2022	Around the Table	Themself	Guest, By Entertainment Weekly	
2022	BuzzFeed Celeb	Themself	Guest	
2022	Friendship Test	Themself	Guest, By Glamour	
2022	Be Coming	Themself	Guest, By Them	
2022	Drip Or Drop?	Themself	Guest, By Cosmopolitan	

=== Music videos ===
Year	Title	Artist
1994	"Everlasting Love"	Gloria Estefan
2011	"Champion"	RuPaul
2011	"Diamond Crowned Queen"	Themself
2012	"Amazing"	Hi Fashion
2012	"Sublime"	Themself
2013	"RuPaulogize"	Willam Belli
2013	"Zubi Zubi Zubi"	Themself
2014	"Lady Marmalade"	The Heathers
2014	"Ransom"	MOXXI
2015	"Not a Pearl"	Willam Belli
2015	"Cholita"	Themself
2016	"Anus"	Alaska Thunderfuck
2017	"Fun"	Blondie
2018	"Excuse the Beauty"	Latrice Royale
2019	"Go Fish"	Manila Luzon
2019	"Comin in Hot"	Adam Lambert
2019	"Moodbored"	Themself
2020	"Nerves of Steel"	Erasure
2021	"Shoes"	Themself

== Awards and nominations ==
Year	Award-giving body	Category	Work	Results	Ref.
2023	Queerty Awards	Drag Royalty	Themself	Won	

Awards and achievements
Preceded by Tyra Sanchez	Winner of RuPaul's Drag Race; US season 3	Succeeded by Sharon Needles
