= RuPaul's Drag Race All Stars season 7 =

2022 season of RuPaul's Drag Race All Stars

RuPaul's Drag Race All Stars
- Season 7
- Promotional poster for season 7
- Hosted by: RuPaul
- Judges: RuPaul; Michelle Visage; Carson Kressley; Ross Mathews
- No. of contestants: 8
- Winner: Jinkx Monsoon
- Runner-up: Monét X Change
- Queen of She Done Already Done Had Herses: Raja
- Companion show: RuPaul's Drag Race: Untucked!
- No. of episodes: 12

Release
- Original network: Paramount+; WOW Presents Plus
- Original release: May 20 – July 29, 2022

Season chronology
- ← Previous; Season 6 Next → Season 8

The seventh season of RuPaul's Drag Race All Stars (also referred to as RuPaul's Drag Race All Stars: All Winners on the show) premiered on Paramount+ on May 20 and concluded on July 29, 2022.

The cast was announced on April 13, 2022, and included eight past winners returning to the competition. The winning queen received a cash prize of $200,000. The season consisted of twelve episodes, with the first two airing on the same day, and featured an Untucked aftershow.

The season featured a new format twist: throughout the season, no one was eliminated. Instead, each week, two top All Stars were awarded a "Legendary Legend Star". The top 2 competed in a Lip Sync For Your Legacy; the winner earned a cash tip and the power to block one of her fellow queens from receiving a star the next week. In the finale, the four queens with the most stars participated in a Lip Sync Smackdown to determine the winner, who received a cash prize of $200,000 and the title "Queen of All Queens". The other four queens participated in a parallel Lip Sync Smackdown for a cash prize of $50,000 and the title of "Queen of She Done Already Done Had Herses".

Jinkx Monsoon won the season and the title of "Queen of All Queens". Monét X Change was the runner-up. Raja won the "Queen of She Done Already Done Had Herses" title.

== Contestants ==
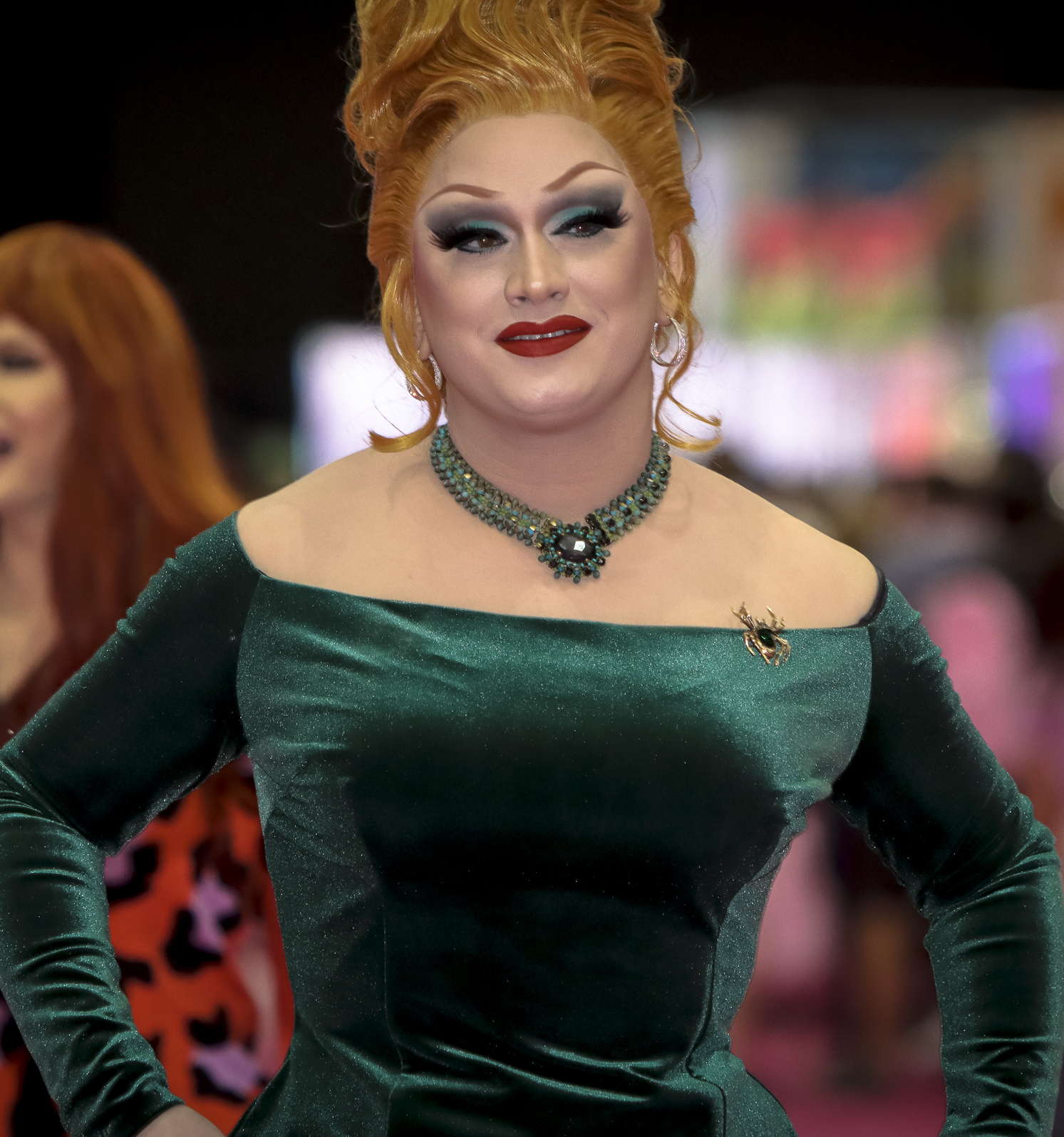
The winner, Jinkx Monsoon.

Ages, names, and cities stated are at time of filming.

Contestants of RuPaul's Drag Race All Stars season 7 and their backgrounds
Contestant	Age	Hometown	Winning season	Finale category (Note: The four queens with the most Legendary Legend Stars advanced to the "Queen of All Queens" Lip Sync LaLaPaRuZa Smackdown. The other four queens participated in the "Queen of She Done Already Done Had Herses" Smackdown.)	Outcome
Jinkx Monsoon	33	Portland, Oregon	Season 5	Queen of All Queens	Winner
Monét X Change	31	New York City	All Stars 4 (Note: Monét X Change originally placed sixth on season 10 and was voted Miss Congeniality by fellow contestants.)	Queen of All Queens	Runner-up
Shea Couleé	32	Chicago, Illinois	All Stars 5 (Note: Shea Couleé and Trinity the Tuck originally placed third on season 9.)	Queen of All Queens	3rd place
Trinity the Tuck (Note: Trinity the Tuck was originally referred to as Trinity Taylor on season 9.)	35	Orlando, Florida	All Stars 4	Queen of All Queens	3rd place
Raja (Note: Raja Gemini is referred to as Raja on the show.)	47	Los Angeles, California	Season 3	She Done Already Done Had Herses	5th place (Note: Raja was crowned the "Queen of She Done Already Done Had Herses".)
Yvie Oddly	27	Denver, Colorado	Season 11	She Done Already Done Had Herses	6th place
Jaida Essence Hall	34	Milwaukee, Wisconsin	Season 12	She Done Already Done Had Herses	7th place
The Vivienne	29	Liverpool, United Kingdom	UK series 1	She Done Already Done Had Herses	7th place

== Contestant progress ==
Legend:

Jinkx Monsoon won RuPaul's Drag Race All Stars season 7.
Monét X Change was the runner-up.
Raja was crowned Queen of She Done Already Done Had Herses (SDADHH).
WIN indicates that the contestant won the challenge, a Legendary Legend Star and the Lip Sync for Your Legacy.
BWIN (Blocked Win) indicates that the contestant won the challenge and the Lip Sync for Your Legacy, but did not earn a Legendary Legend Star due to being blocked the previous week.
TOP2 indicates that the contestant won the challenge and a Legendary Legend Star, but lost the Lip Sync for Your Legacy.
BTOP (Blocked Top All Star) indicates that the contestant won the challenge, lost the Lip Sync for Your Legacy and did not earn a Legendary Legend Star due to being blocked the previous week.
SAFE indicates that the contestant was declared safe by the judges.
The contestant collected enough stars to advance to the Lip Sync Smackdown for the Crown.
BLK (Blocked) indicates that the contestant was blocked by the lip sync winner from earning a Legendary Legend Star the following week.
LOSS indicates that the eliminated contestant participated in the She Done Already Done Had Herses Lip Sync Smackdown, but lost one of the lip syncs.
The contestant was eliminated.

Contestants progress with placements in each episode
Contestant	Episode											Stars (Note: The final count of Legendary Legend Stars was made at the end of episode 11.)	Finale
Contestant	1	2	3	4	5	6 (Note: On episode 5, the two Top All Stars were each awarded two stars: one to keep and one to give to another queen at the start of episode 6. Raja gave her star to Yvie Oddly and Jinkx Monsoon gave hers to Jaida Essence Hall.)	7	8	9	10	11 (Note: On episode 11, both Top All Stars, Monét X Change and Shea Couleé, were awarded three Legendary Legend Stars. Because Trinity the Tuck and Jaida Essence Hall were tied for fourth place with three stars, the queen with the most stars, Monét X Change with five, was asked to decide whom to admit to the finale Lip Sync LaLaPaRuZa Smackdown, choosing Trinity.)	Stars	12
Jinkx Monsoon	SAFE	WIN	BLK	BTOP	WIN	BLK	SAFE	SAFE	TOP2	WIN	SAFE	4	Winner
Monét X Change	TOP2	SAFE	SAFE	BLK	SAFE	SAFE	SAFE	SAFE	WIN	SAFE	TOP2	5	Runner-up
Shea Couleé	WIN	BLK	SAFE	SAFE	SAFE	SAFE	SAFE	SAFE	SAFE	SAFE	WIN	4	Eliminated
Trinity the Tuck	BLK	BTOP	TOP2	SAFE	SAFE	SAFE	WIN	SAFE	SAFE	TOP2	SAFE	3	Eliminated
Raja	SAFE	SAFE	SAFE	SAFE	TOP2	SAFE	SAFE	WIN	BLK	SAFE	SAFE	2	SDADHH
Yvie Oddly	SAFE	SAFE	SAFE	SAFE	SAFE	TOP2	BLK	SAFE	SAFE	SAFE	SAFE	2	LOSS
Jaida Essence Hall	SAFE	SAFE	WIN	SAFE	SAFE	SAFE	TOP2	BLK	SAFE	SAFE	SAFE	3	LOSS
The Vivienne	SAFE	SAFE	SAFE	WIN	BLK	BWIN	SAFE	TOP2	SAFE	SAFE	SAFE	2	LOSS

== Lip syncs ==
Legend:

The contestant was blocked for the first time.
The contestant was blocked for the second time.
The contestant won the first round of the Lip Sync Smackdown for the Crown and advanced to the second.
The contestant won the first round of the Eliminated Queens Lip Sync Smackdown and advanced to the second.
The contestant won the second round of the Eliminated Queens Lip Sync Smackdown and was declared the Queen of the She Done Already Done Had Herses.
The contestant won the second round of the Lip Sync Smackdown for the Crown and was declared the winner of the season.

Episode	Top All Stars			Song or Media	Winner	Blocked
1	Monét X Change	vs.	Shea Couleé	"Old MacDonald" (Ella Fitzgerald)	Shea Couleé	Trinity the Tuck
2	Jinkx Monsoon	vs.	Trinity the Tuck	"Rumour Has It" (Adele)	Jinkx Monsoon	Shea Couleé
3	Jaida Essence Hall	vs.	Trinity the Tuck	"Green Light" (Beyoncé)	Jaida Essence Hall	Jinkx Monsoon
4	Jinkx Monsoon	vs.	The Vivienne	"Love Will Save the Day (Jellybean/David Morales Remix)" (Whitney Houston)	The Vivienne	Monét X Change
5	Jinkx Monsoon	vs.	Raja	"Better in Color" (Lizzo)	Jinkx Monsoon	The Vivienne
6	The Vivienne	vs.	Yvie Oddly	"Why'd You Come in Here Lookin' Like That" (Dolly Parton)	The Vivienne	Jinkx Monsoon
7	Jaida Essence Hall	vs.	Trinity the Tuck	"I Want Love" (Jessie J)	Trinity the Tuck	Yvie Oddly
8	Raja	vs.	The Vivienne	"Super Freak" (Rick James)	Raja	Jaida Essence Hall
9	Jinkx Monsoon	vs.	Monét X Change	"The Night the Lights Went Out in Georgia" (Note: From the second episode of the first season of Designing Women. It is the first time in Drag Race history in which the queens have to perform in a spoken word lip sync.) (Dixie Carter as Julia Sugarbaker)	Monét X Change	Raja
10	Jinkx Monsoon	vs.	Trinity the Tuck	"Kings & Queens" (Ava Max)	Jinkx Monsoon	None (Note: On episode 10, RuPaul announced a revision to the All Stars rules: no one would be blocked the following weeks.)
11	Monét X Change	vs.	Shea Couleé	"Supernova" (Kylie Minogue)	Shea Couleé	None
Episode	Contestants			Song	Winner	
12	The Vivienne	vs.	Yvie Oddly	"Push It" (Salt-N-Pepa)	Yvie Oddly	
12	Jaida Essence Hall	vs.	Raja	"Let's Hear It for the Boy" (Deniece Williams)	Raja	
12	Jinkx Monsoon	vs.	Shea Couleé	"Judas" (Lady Gaga)	Jinkx Monsoon	
12	Monét X Change	vs.	Trinity the Tuck	"So What" (P!nk)	Monét X Change	
12	Raja	vs.	Yvie Oddly	"Sisters Are Doin' It for Themselves" (Eurythmics, Aretha Franklin)	Raja	
12	Jinkx Monsoon	vs.	Monét X Change	"Swish Swish" (Katy Perry ft. Nicki Minaj)	Jinkx Monsoon	

== Guest judges ==
Listed in chronological order:

- Cameron Diaz, actress and model
- Daphne Guinness, socialite and designer
- Kirby Howell-Baptiste, actress
- Jeffrey Bowyer-Chapman, actor and model
- Nikki Glaser, stand-up comedian and actress
- Tove Lo, Swedish singer, songwriter and actress
- Betsey Johnson, fashion designer
- Janicza Bravo, film director and producer
- Ben Platt, actor, singer and songwriter
- Ronan Farrow, journalist
- Hannah Einbinder, comedian and actress

=== Special guests ===
Guests who appeared in episodes, but did not judge on the main stage.

Episode 1:

- Raven, runner-up of both RuPaul's Drag Race Season 2 and All Stars 1
- Naomi Campbell, British supermodel and actress

Episode 3:

- Vanna White, American television personality

Episode 5:

- Nancy Pelosi, Speaker of the United States House of Representatives

Episode 6:

- Leland, producer

Episode 10:

- Kennedy Davenport, contestant on RuPaul's Drag Race Season 7 and runner-up of All Stars 3
- Solomon Georgio, writer and comedian
- Wintergreen, drag persona of Sarge, Drag Race cameraman and Peppermint's makeover subject on RuPaul's Drag Race Season 9

== Episodes ==
No. overall	No. in season	Title	Original release date
54	1	"Legends"	May 20, 2022
Eight previous winners from the Drag Race Franchise enter the workroom. RuPaul reveals the season's twist: there will be no eliminations throughout the season. Instead, the Top 2 All Stars of the week each receive a Legendary Legend Star, then participate in a Lip Sync for Your Legacy. The winner of the lip sync earns a $10,000 tip and the opportunity to "block" one of the six safe queens, meaning that even if she wins the next week's challenge, she will be prevented from winning a star. At the end of the season, the four queens with the most Legendary Legend Stars will participate in a Lip Sync LaLaPaRUza For The Crown. For the first mini-challenge, the queens read each other to filth. Jinkx Monsoon wins the mini-challenge. After the mini-challenge, RuPaul brings the queens to the main stage, where they receive a runway modeling coaching session from Naomi Campbell. For the main challenge, the queens write and perform original verses and choreography to RuPaul's song "Legends". On the runway, category is "I'm Crowning". After critiques, the judges highlight Monét X Change, Shea Couleé, Trinity the Tuck, and Yvie Oddly. Monét X Change and Shea Couleé are the top 2 queens of the week. They lip-sync to "Old MacDonald" by Ella Fitzgerald. Shea Couleé wins the lip-sync and blocks Trinity the Tuck from receiving a star next week.: Guest Judge: Cameron Diaz; Alternating Judge: Carson Kressley; Mini-Challenge: Reading is Fundamental; Mini-Challenge Winner: Jinkx Monsoon; Mini-Challenge Prize: A$2,500 cash tip; Main Challenge: Write and perform original verses on RuPaul's "Legends"; Runway Theme: I'm Crowning; Challenge Winners: Monét X Change and Shea Couleé; Stars Awarded: 1 to Monét X Change and 1 to Shea Couleé; Lip Sync Song: "Old MacDonald" by Ella Fitzgerald; Lip Sync for Your Legacy Winner: Shea Couleé; Blocked: Trinity the Tuck
55	2	"Snatch Game"	May 20, 2022
The queens play the Snatch Game, with a twist: each contestant is required to impersonate two celebrities for the challenge. The performances are as follows: Jaida Essence Hall as Prince and The Lady Chablis; Jinkx Monsoon as Natasha Lyonne and Judy Garland; Monét X Change as Mike Tyson and Martin Lawrence (in character as Sheneneh Jenkins from Martin); Raja as Madame and Diana Vreeland; Shea Couleé as Elsa Majimbo and Miss J.; Trinity The Tuck as Satan and Leslie Jordan; The Vivienne as Joanna Lumley (as Patsy Stone from Absolutely Fabulous) and Catherine Tate (as Joanie "Nan" Taylor from The Catherine Tate Show); Yvie Oddly as Rico Nasty and The Boogieman; On the runway, category is "The Pleather Principle". After critiques, the judges highlight Jinkx Monsoon, Monét X Change, Raja, and Trinity the Tuck. Jinkx Monsoon and Trinity the Tuck are the top 2 queens of the week. They lip-sync to "Rumour Has It" by Adele. Jinkx Monsoon wins the lip-sync and blocks Shea Couleé from receiving a star next week.: Guest Judge: Daphne Guinness; Alternating Judge: Ross Mathews; Main Challenge: Impersonate two celebrities in the Snatch Game; Runway Theme: The Pleather Principle; Challenge Winners: Jinkx Monsoon and Trinity the Tuck; Stars Awarded: 1 to Jinkx Monsoon and 0 to Trinity the Tuck (Blocked in Episode 1); Lip Sync Song: "Rumour Has It" by Adele; Lip Sync for Your Legacy Winner: Jinkx Monsoon; Blocked: Shea Couleé
56	3	"The Realness of Fortune Ball"	May 27, 2022
For this weeks mini-challenge, the queens play "Hung Man". Jinkx Monsoon wins the mini-challenge. The week's maxi-challenge is The Realness of Fortune ball. The queens are challenged to present three runway looks in categories inspired by the game show Wheel of Fortune. The categories are Vanna White Realness; Before and After, inspired by the pun-based answers commonly featured in Wheel of Fortune answers; and Realness of Fortune Eleganza, a look made in the Werk Room from materials in a single color palette inspired by a vacation destination, a reference to the vacation prize packages often awarded on Wheel of Fortune. The Before and After puns and the color assignments are as follows: Jaida Essence Hall: "Bag Lady in Red" and Black Sand Beach, Big Island, Hawaii; Jinkx Monsoon: "What Ever Happened to Baby Jane Fonda?" and The Lavender Fields, Provence, France; Monét X Change: "Bob The Drag Queen Elizabeth" and The Emerald Isle, Ireland; Raja: "Olivia Newton-John Waters" and The Golden Pagoda, Yangon, Myanmar; Shea Couleé: "Gold Tooth Fairy" and The White Cliffs, Dover, England; Trinity The Tuck: "RuPaul Charles II" and Red Square, Moscow, Russia; The Vivienne: "Princess Diana Ross" and The Great Blue Hole, Belize; Yvie Oddly: "Cardi B. Arthur" and The Pink City, Jaipur, India; Vanna White makes a surprise guest appearance on the runway to introduce the ball categories and the queens. After critiques, the judges highlight Jaida Essence Hall, Raja, Shea Couleé, and Trinity the Tuck. Jaida Essence Hall and Trinity the Tuck are the top 2 queens of the week. They lip-sync to "Green Light" by Beyoncé. Jaida Essence Hall wins the lip-sync and blocks Jinkx Monsoon from receiving a star next week.: Guest Judge: Kirby Howell-Baptiste; Alternating Judge: Carson Kressley; Mini-Challenge: Hungman: Fill in a Before-and-After word puzzle; Mini-Challenge Winner: Jinkx Monsoon; Main Challenge: Present three looks, including one designed and sewn in the Werk Room, for the Realness of Fortune Ball; Runway Themes: Vanna White Realness, Before and After, and Realness of Fortune Eleganza; Challenge Winners: Jaida Essence Hall and Trinity the Tuck; Stars Awarded: 1 to Jaida Essence Hall and 1 to Trinity the Tuck; Lip Sync Song: "Green Light" by Beyoncé; Lip Sync for Your Legacy Winner: Jaida Essence Hall; Blocked: Jinkx Monsoon
57	4	"Fairytale Justice"	June 3, 2022
This week, the queens act in improv scenes in the "Fairytale Justice" courtroom, presided over by Judge Michelle Visage. As the top 2 All Stars in last week's challenge, Jaida Essence Hall and Trinity the Tuck are team captains. Jaida chooses Jinkx Monsoon, Monét X Change, and Yvie Oddly, and Trinity chooses Shea Couleé, The Vivienne, and Raja. Team Jaida argue the case "Blow The House Down Boots", based on The Three Little Pigs, and Team Trinity act in "She Done Already Done Had Herses", based on Goldilocks and the Three Bears. On the main stage, category is "Spikes on The Runway". After critiques, the judges highlight Jinkx Monsoon, Raja, The Vivienne, and Yvie Oddly. Jinkx Monsoon and The Vivienne are the top 2 queens of the week. They lip-sync to "Love Will Save the Day (Jellybean & David Morales Remix)" by Whitney Houston. The Vivienne wins the lip-sync and blocks Monét X Change from receiving a star next week.: Guest Judge: Jeffrey Bowyer-Chapman; Alternating Judge: Ross Mathews; Main Challenge: In two teams, improvise courtroom scenes in "Fairytale Justice"; Runway Theme: Spikes on the Runway; Challenge Winners: Jinkx Monsoon and The Vivienne; Stars Awarded: 0 to Jinkx Monsoon (Blocked in Episode 3) and 1 to The Vivienne; Lip Sync Song: "Love Will Save The Day (Jellybean & David Morales Remix)" by Whitney Houston; Lip Sync for Your Legacy Winner: The Vivienne; Blocked: Monét X Change
58	5	"Draguation Speeches"	June 10, 2022
This week, the queens are challenged to write and deliver graduation speeches. As the blocked queen of the week, Monét X Change has the opportunity to determine the speaking order. RuPaul also announces that, this week, the top 2 queens will receive two stars: one for themselves and one to award to another queen of their choosing. On the main stage, category is "Veiled It". Before the queens leave the runway to untuck, Speaker of the House Nancy Pelosi makes a special appearance to express her admiration of and support for the queens and to encourage viewers to make their voices heard in the upcoming midterm elections. After critiques, the judges highlight Jinkx Monsoon, Raja, The Vivienne, and Shea Couleé. Jinkx Monsoon and Raja are the top 2 queens of the week. They lip-sync to "Better In Color" by Lizzo. Jinkx Monsoon wins the lip-sync and blocks The Vivienne from receiving a star next week.: Guest Judge: Nikki Glaser; Alternating Judge: Carson Kressley; Main Challenge: Write and deliver "Draguation Speeches"; Runway Theme: Veiled It; Challenge Winners: Jinkx Monsoon and Raja; Stars Awarded: 1 to Jinkx Monsoon and 1 to Raja; Lip Sync Song: "Better In Color" by Lizzo; Lip Sync for Your Legacy Winner: Jinkx Monsoon; Blocked: The Vivienne
59	6	"Total RuQuest Live"	June 17, 2022
First, Jinkx Monsoon and Raja decide to whom they will give the bonus stars they won last week: Raja awards hers to Yvie Oddly and Jinkx Monsoon to Jaida Essence Hall. This week, the queens are challenged to write, record, and perform two Y2K girl group tracks on a flashback episode of MTV's Total Request Live. As "M.S.T.R.", Monét X Change, Shea Couleé, Trinity the Tuck, and Raja perform the breakup song "Titanic". As "The Other Girls", Jaida Essence Hall, Jinkx Monsoon, The Vivienne, and Yvie Oddly perform the love song "2-gether 4-ever". On the runway, category is "Night of a Thousand Dolly Partons". After critiques, the judges highlight Monét X Change, Shea Couleé, The Vivienne, and Yvie Oddly. The Vivienne and Yvie Oddly are the top 2 queens of the week. They lip-sync to "Why'd You Come in Here Lookin' Like That" by Dolly Parton. The Vivienne wins the lip-sync and blocks Jinkx Monsoon from receiving a star next week.: Guest Judge: Tove Lo; Alternating Judge: Ross Mathews; Main Challenge: Write, record, and perform throwback tracks as Y2K girl groups; Runway Theme: Night of a Thousand Dolly Partons; Challenge Winners: The Vivienne and Yvie Oddly; Stars Awarded: 1 to Jaida Essence Hall (from Jinkx Monsoon), 0 to The Vivienne (blocked in Episode 5), and 2 to Yvie Oddly (1 from Raja); Lip Sync Song: "Why'd You Come in Here Lookin' Like That" by Dolly Parton; Lip Sync for Your Legacy Winner: The Vivienne; Blocked: Jinkx Monsoon
60	7	"Legendary Legend Looks"	June 24, 2022
For this week's maxi-challenge, the queens must design, construct, and present a Legendary Legend Look inspired by one of RuPaul's iconic Zaldy-designed garments. After the queens present their looks on the runway and receive critiques, the judges highlight Jaida Essence Hall, Monét X Change, Shea Couleé, and Trinity The Tuck. Jaida Essence Hall and Trinity The Tuck are the top 2 queens of the week. They lip-sync to "I Want Love" by Jessie J. Trinity The Tuck wins the lip-sync and blocks Yvie Oddly from receiving a star next week.: Guest Judge: Betsey Johnson; Alternating Judge: Carson Kressley; Main Challenge: Design, construct, and present RuPaul-inspired looks; Runway Theme: Legendary Legend Looks; Challenge Winners: Jaida Essence Hall and Trinity the Tuck; Stars Awarded: 1 to Jaida Essence Hall and 1 to Trinity The Tuck; Lip Sync Song: "I Want Love" by Jessie J; Lip Sync for Your Legacy Winner: Trinity The Tuck; Blocked: Yvie Oddly
61	8	"Santa's School for Girls"	July 1, 2022
For this week's maxi challenge, the queens act in the short film Santa's School For Girls. As last week's lip sync winner, Trinity gets to assign the roles. On the runway, category is "Knitty Knitty Bang Bang". After critiques, the judges highlight Jaida Essence Hall, Raja, Trinity the Tuck, and The Vivienne. Raja and The Vivienne are the top two 2 queens of the week. They lip-sync to "Super Freak" by Rick James. Raja wins the lip-sync and blocks Jaida Essence Hall from receiving a star next week.: Guest Judge: Janicza Bravo; Alternating Judge: Ross Mathews; Main Challenge: Act in Santa's School For Girls; Runway Theme: Knitty Knitty Bang Bang; Challenge Winners: Raja and The Vivienne; Stars Awarded: 1 to Raja and 1 to The Vivienne; Lip Sync Song: "Super Freak" by Rick James; Lip Sync for Your Legacy Winner: Raja; Blocked: Jaida Essence Hall
62	9	"Dance Like a Drag Queen"	July 8, 2022
For this week's maxi challenge, the queens choreograph and perform viral dance challenge videos emphasizing their personal brands. On the runway, category is "What Lies Beneath", looks with many reveals. After critiques, the judges highlight Jink Monsoon, Monét X Change, Shea Couleé, and Yvie Oddly. Jinkx Monsoon and Monét X Change are the top two 2 queens of the week. They lip-sync to a monologue – a first in Drag Race history – from the episode "The Beauty Contest" of the 1980s sitcom Designing Women, delivered by Dixie Carter's character Julia Sugarbaker. Monét X Change wins the lip-sync and blocks Raja from receiving a star next week.: Guest Judge: Ben Platt; Alternating Judge: Carson Kressley; Main Challenge: Choreograph and perform viral social media dance challenge videos; Runway Theme: What Lies Beneath; Challenge Winners: Jinkx Monsoon and Monét X Change; Stars Awarded: 1 to Jinkx Monsoon and 1 to Monét X Change; Spoken Word Lip Sync: "The Night The Lights Went Out in Georgia" Monologue from Designing Women by Dixie Carter as Julia Sugarbaker; Lip Sync for Your Legacy Winner: Monét X Change; Blocked: Raja
63	10	"The Kennedy Davenport Center Honors Hall of Shade"	July 15, 2022
For this week's maxi challenge, the queens roast each other as inductees at the Kennedy Davenport Center Honors Hall of Shade. On the runway, category is "All Glowed Up", looks with lights. Before critiques, RuPaul announces a revision to the All Stars rules: no one will be blocked this week. After critiques, the judges highlight Jinkx Monsoon, Monét X Change, Trinity the Tuck, and The Vivienne. Jinkx Monsoon and Trinity the Tuck are the top two 2 queens of the week. They lip-sync to "Kings & Queens" by Ava Max. Jinkx Monsoon wins the lip-sync.: Guest Judge: Ronan Farrow; Alternating Judge: Ross Mathews; Main Challenge: Write and perform a roast; Runway Theme: All Glowed Up; Challenge Winners: Jinkx Monsoon and Trinity the Tuck; Stars Awarded: 1 to Jinkx Monsoon and 1 to Trinity the Tuck; Lip Sync Song: "Kings & Queens" by Ava Max; Lip Sync for Your Legacy Winner: Jinkx Monsoon; Blocked: None
64	11	"Drag Race Gives Back Variety Extravaganza"	July 22, 2022
This week, the maxi-challenge is a variety show talent showcase. RuPaul announces that the top two All Stars this week each receive three Legendary Legend Stars, and that the winner of the lip-sync earns a $30,000 donation to a charity of her choosing in addition to the normal cash tip. As the queens prepare, RuPaul and Michelle Visage host a tic-tac luncheon with each queen to discuss her progress on the season. (Charities: Trinity – Planned Parenthood; The Vivenne – Trans Lifeline; Monét – Color of Change; Yvie National Coalition Against Domestic Violence; Shea – Period Poverty Project; Raja – National Center for Trans Equality; Jinkx – Black Visions Collective; Jaida – Free Black Therapy) After the variety show, the judges highlight Monét X Change, Raja, Shea Couleé, and Yvie Oddly. Monét X Change and Shea Couleé are the top two 2 queens of the week. With five, four, and four stars, respectively, Monét X Change, Shea Couleé, and Jinkx Monsoon advance to the Lip Sync LaLaPaRUza Smackdown; Jaida Essence Hall and Trinity the Tuck are tied for the fourth position, with three stars each. RuPaul asks Monét X Change, as the queen with the most stars, to break the tie by deciding, on the spot, which queen to invite to the finale. She chooses Trinity the Tuck. Monét X Change and Shea Couleé lip-sync to "Supernova" by Kylie Minogue. Shea Couleé wins the lip-sync. RuPaul announces that, in addition to the Lip Sync LaLaPaRUza Smackdown to determine the Queen of All Queens, a second lipsync tournament will be held amongst the other four queens to determine the Queen of She Done Already Done Had Herses, who will earn a $50,000 cash prize.: Guest Judge: Hannah Einbinder; Alternating Judge: Carson Kressley; Main Challenge: Perform a variety show number; Challenge Winners: Monét X Change and Shea Couleé; Stars Awarded: 3 to Monét X Change and 3 to Shea Couleé; Lip Sync Song: "Supernova" by Kylie Minogue; Lip Sync for Your Legacy Winner: Shea Couleé; Queen of All Queens Finalists: Jinkx Monsoon, Monét X Change, Shea Couleé, and Trinity the Tuck; Queen of She Done Already Done Had Herses Finalists: Jaida Essence Hall, Raja, The Vivienne, and Yvie Oddly
65	12	"Lip Sync LaLaPaRuZa Smackdown"	July 29, 2022
The queens walk the runway one last time in "Grand Finale Eleganza" and receive their final critiques from the judges. RuPaul performs "Smile". To determine the Queen of She Done Already Done Had Herses and the Queen of All Queens, the queens compete in two Lip Sync LaLaPaRuza Smackdowns. Raja and Yvie Oddly advance to the final lipsync in the first smackdown, with Raja winning. Jinkx Monsoon and Monét X Change advance to the final lipsync in the second smackdown, with Jinkx Monsoon winning.: Runway Theme: Grand Finale Eleganza; Lip Sync Songs: "Push It" by Salt-N-Pepa, "Let's Hear It For The Boy" by Deniece Williams, "Judas" by Lady Gaga, "So What" by P!nk, "Sisters Are Doin' It For Themselves" by Eurythmics and Aretha Franklin, "Swish Swish" by Katy Perry ft. Nicki Minaj; Eliminated: The Vivienne, Jaida Essence Hall, Shea Couleé, Trinity the Tuck and Yvie Oddly; Queen of She Done Already Done Had Herses: Raja; Runner-up: Monét X Change; Winner of RuPaul's Drag Race All Stars season 7: Jinkx Monsoon
