= List of RuPaul's Drag Race All Stars contestants =

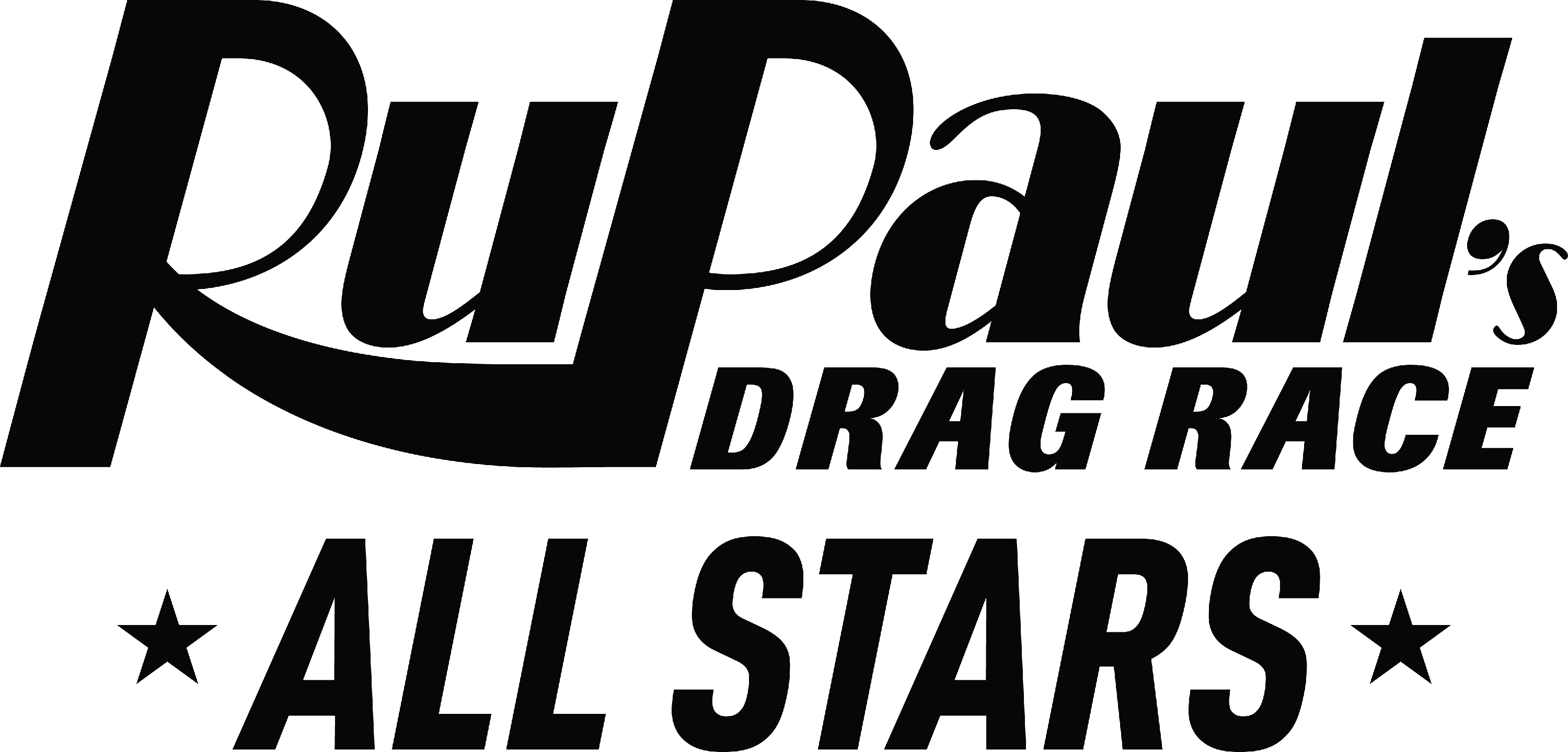
Logo for RuPaul's Drag Race All Stars

RuPaul's Drag Race All Stars, a spin-off series in which past contestants return to compete for a spot in the Drag Race "Hall of Fame", premiered in 2012.

As of 2026, fourteen contestants have competed in more than one season of All Stars. From All Stars 1, Manila Luzon and Latrice Royale, "Team Latrila", returned to All Stars 4 to compete as individual contestants; Jujubee and Alexis Mateo returned to All Stars 5; Yara Sofia and Pandora Boxx returned to All Stars 6; and Shannel returned to All Stars 9. From All Stars 2 Roxxxy Andrews returned to All Stars 9; and Ginger Minj returned to All Stars 6 and All Stars 10. From All Stars 3 Aja returned to All Stars 10; and Morgan McMichaels and Kennedy Davenport to All Stars 11. From All Stars 6 A'keria C. Davenport and Silky Nutmeg Ganache to All Stars 11. From All Stars 9 Jorgeous returned to All Stars 10.

Monét X Change, Trinity the Tuck and Shea Couleé, winners of All Stars 4 and 5, returned to All Stars 7, the first ever season to exclusively feature winners of previous seasons.

All Stars 7 also featured The Vivienne, winner of the first series of RuPaul’s Drag Race UK, becoming the first American season to feature a queen who first appeared on an international franchise. All Stars 8 became the second such season, featuring Jimbo, who had previously appeared on the first season of Canada's Drag Race and on the first series of RuPaul's Drag Race: UK vs the World.

== List of contestants ==
Ages, names, and cities stated are at time of filming.

Legend

The contestant won the season, episode, or special.
The contestant returned to the competition after being eliminated during the season.

† indicates that the contestant is deceased.

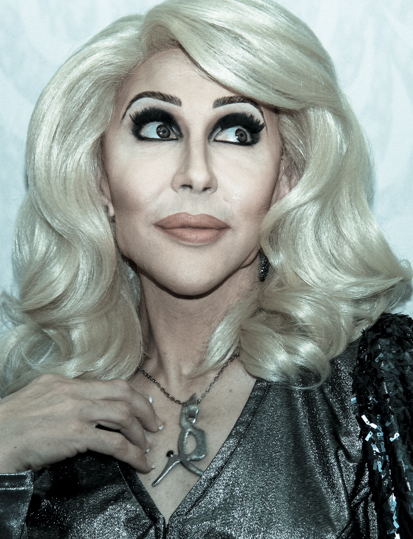
Season 1 winner
Chad Michaels

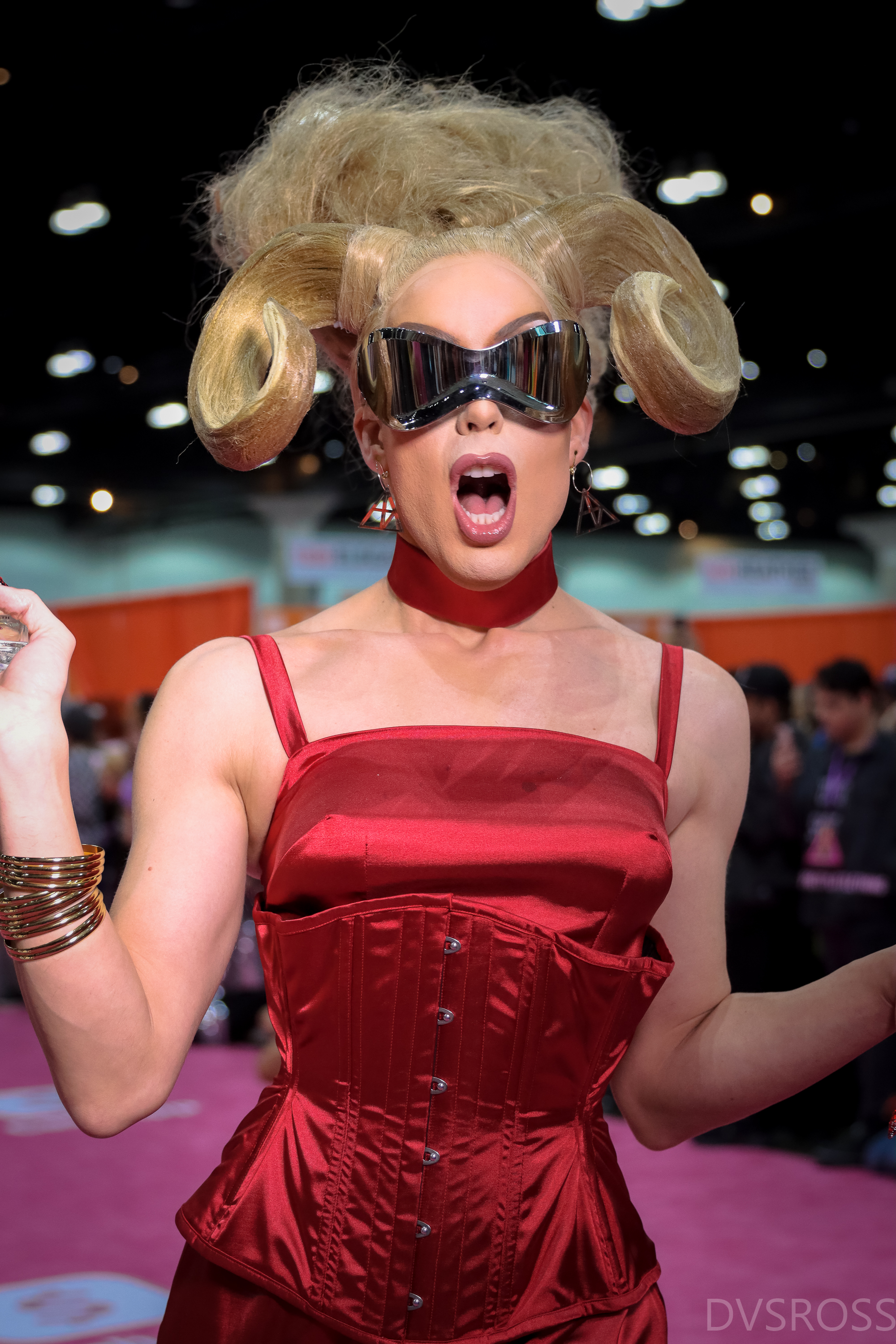
Season 2 winner
Alaska

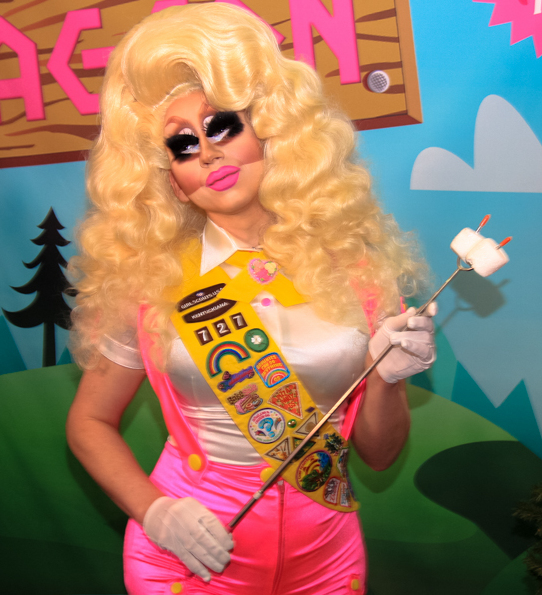
Season 3 winner
Trixie Mattel

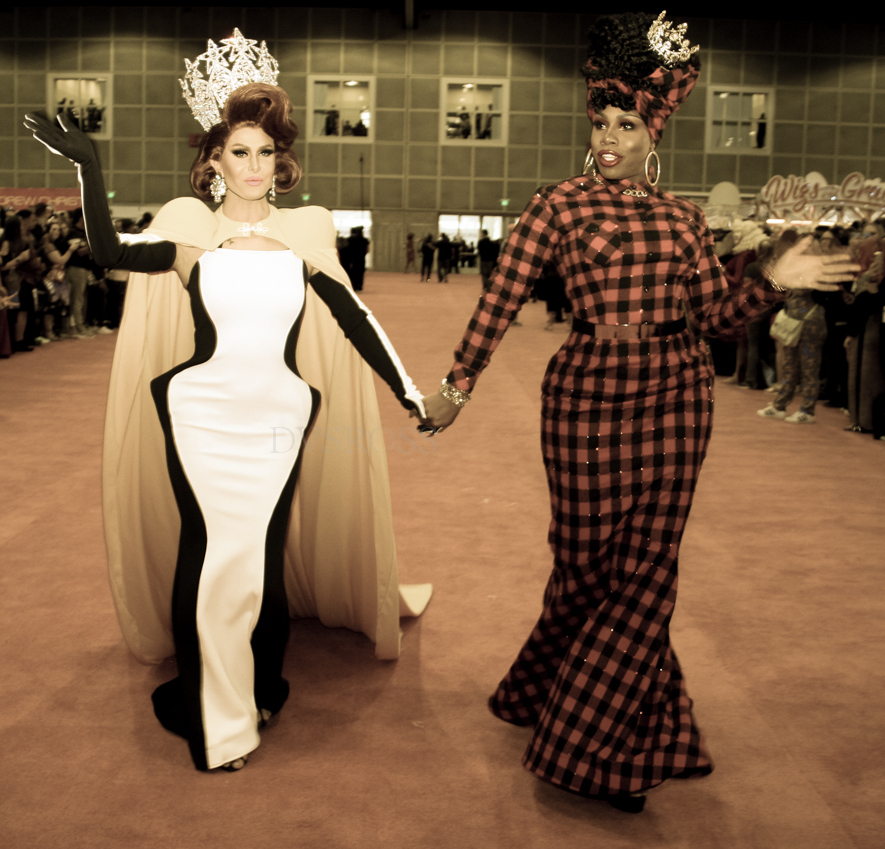
Season 4 winners
Monét X Change and Trinity the Tuck

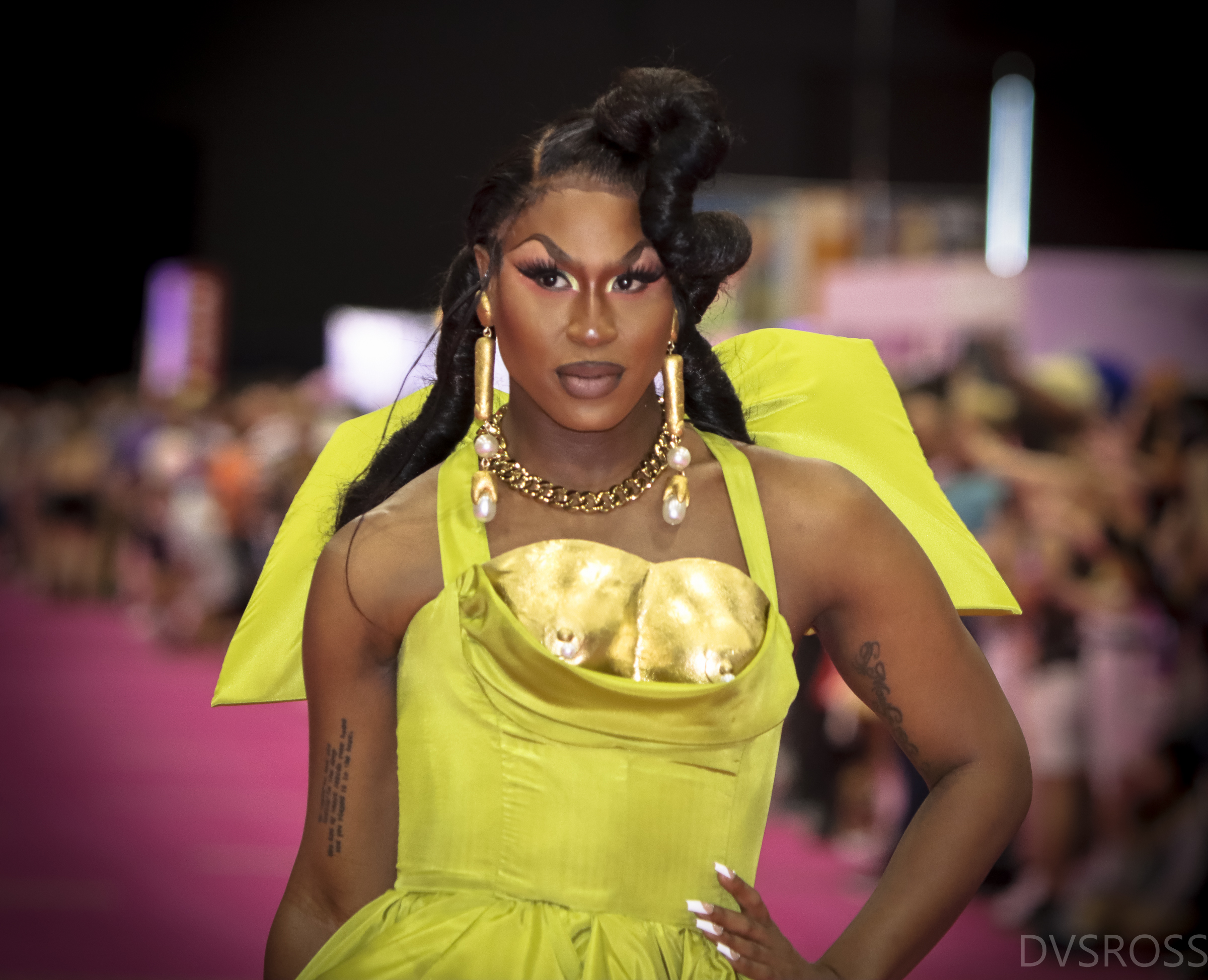
Season 5 winner
Shea Couleé

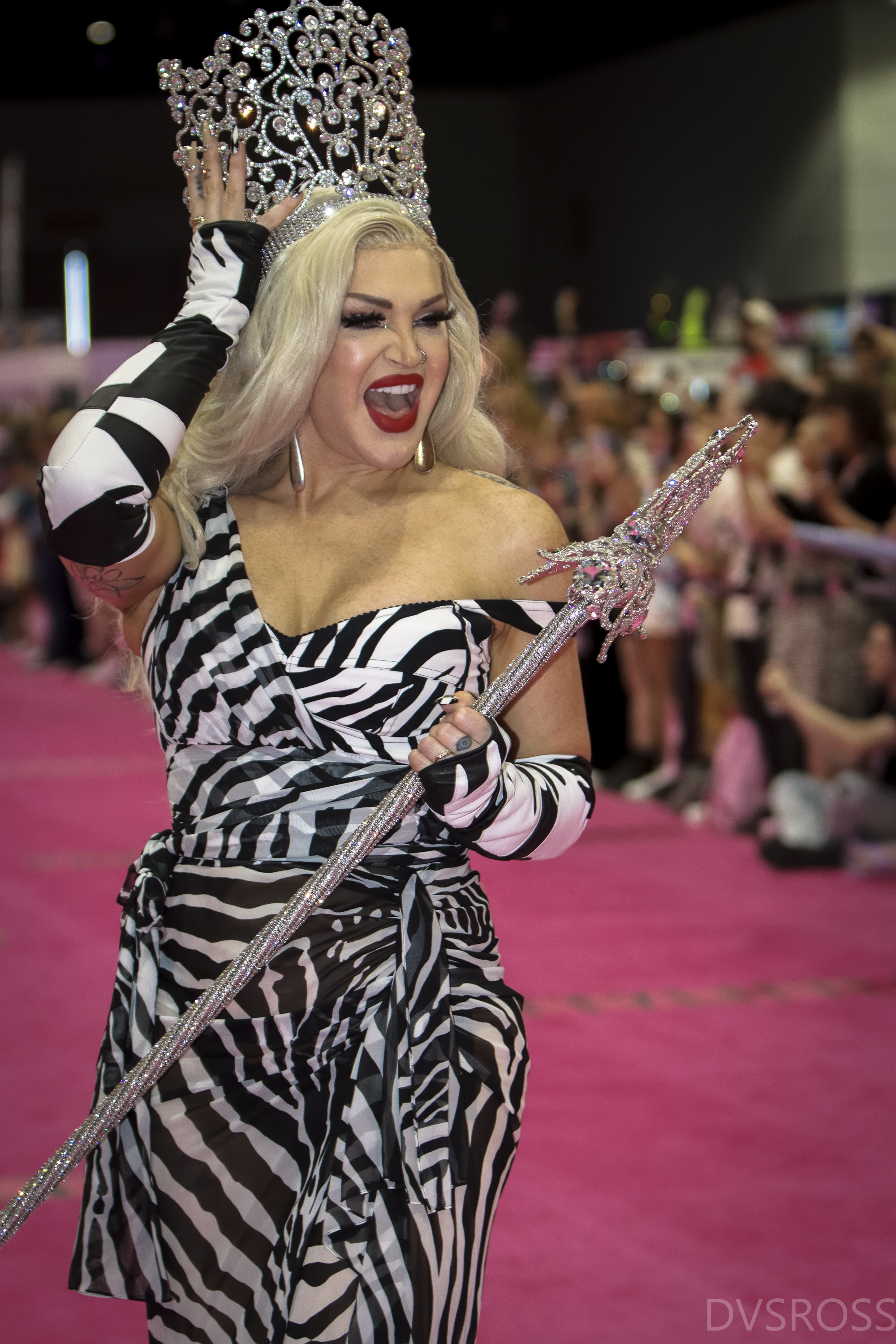
Season 6 winner
Kylie Sonique Love

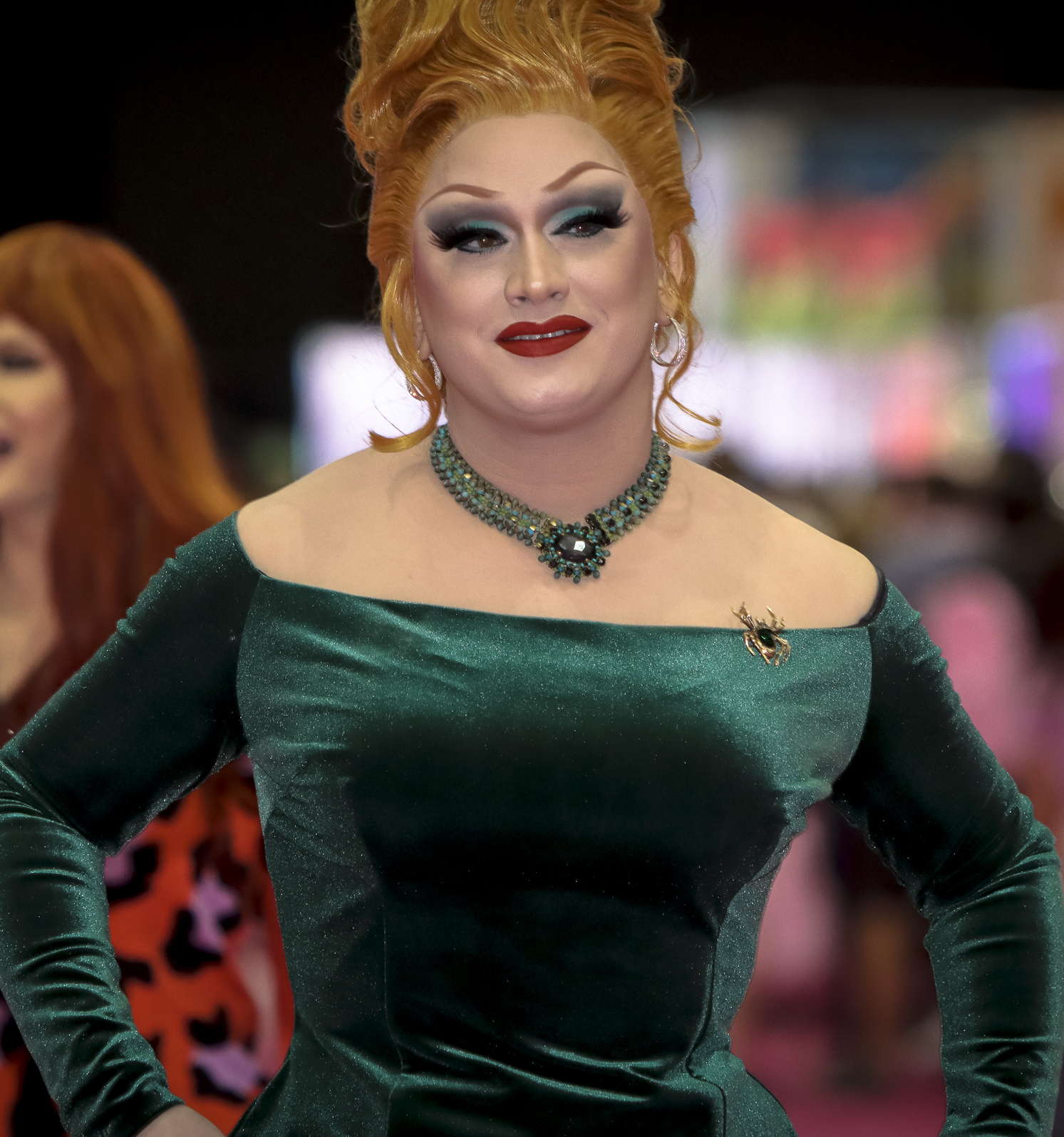
Season 7 winner
Jinkx Monsoon

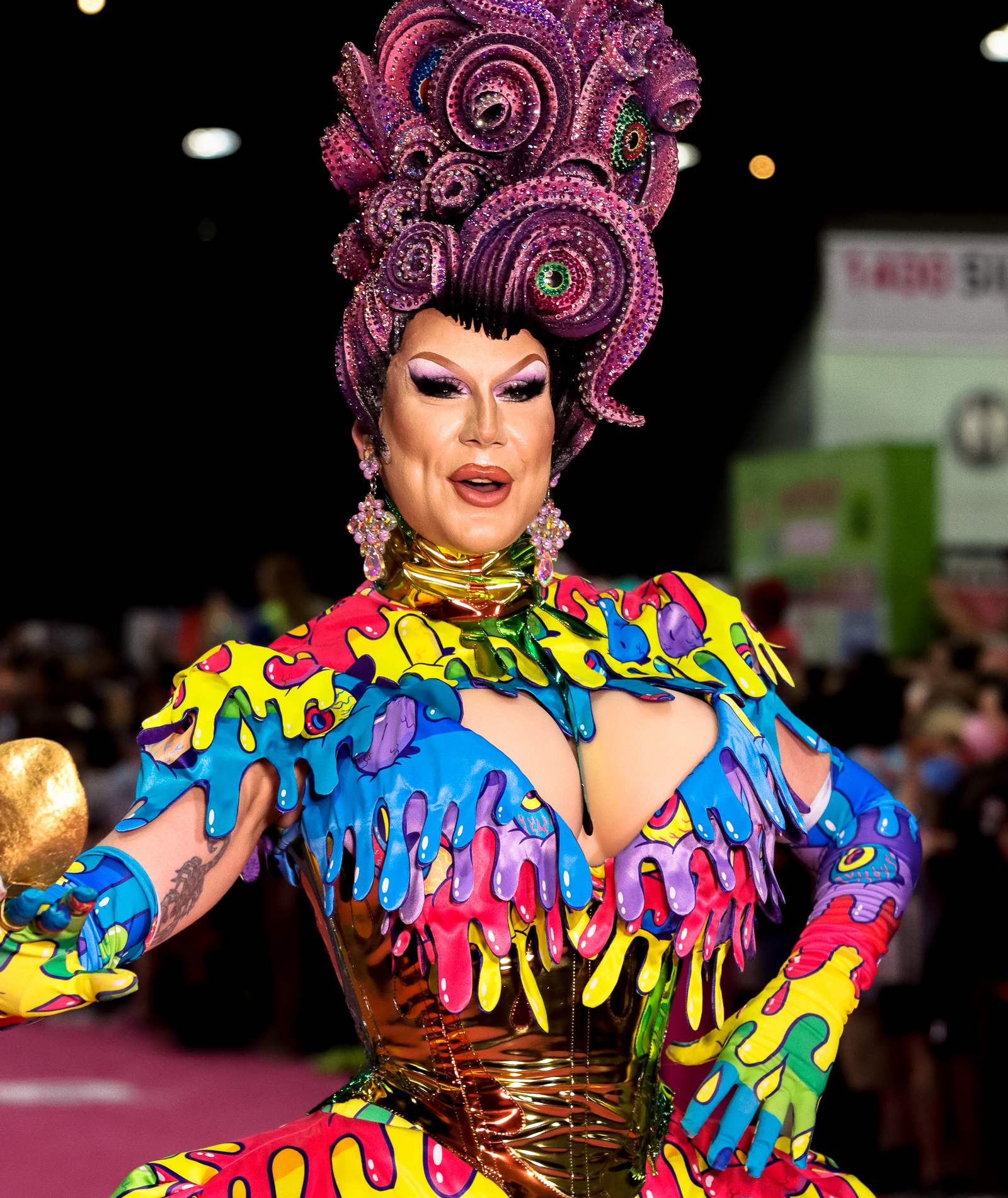
Season 8 winner
Jimbo

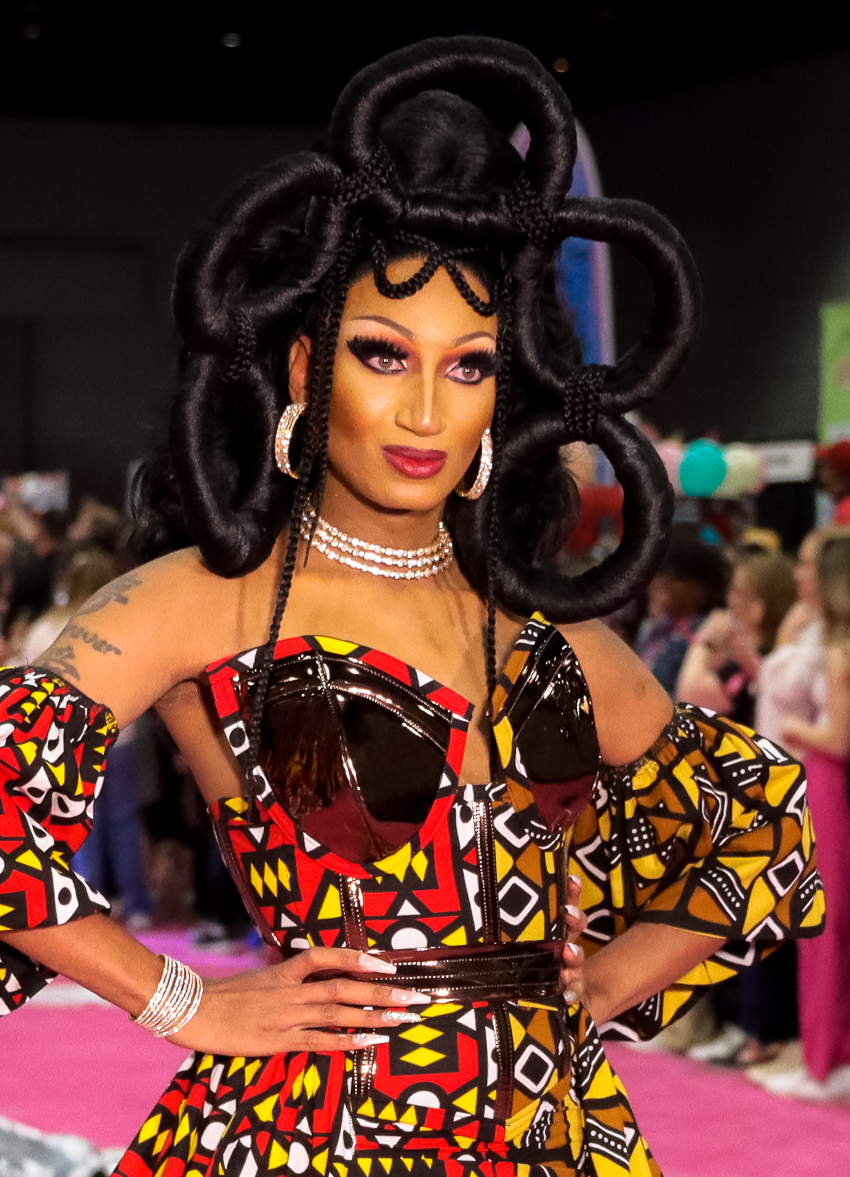
Season 9 winner
Angeria Paris VanMicheals

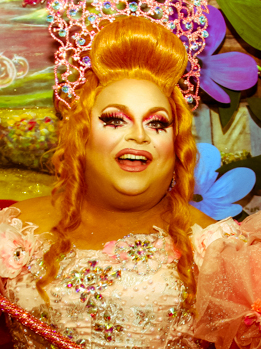
Season 10 winner
Ginger Minj

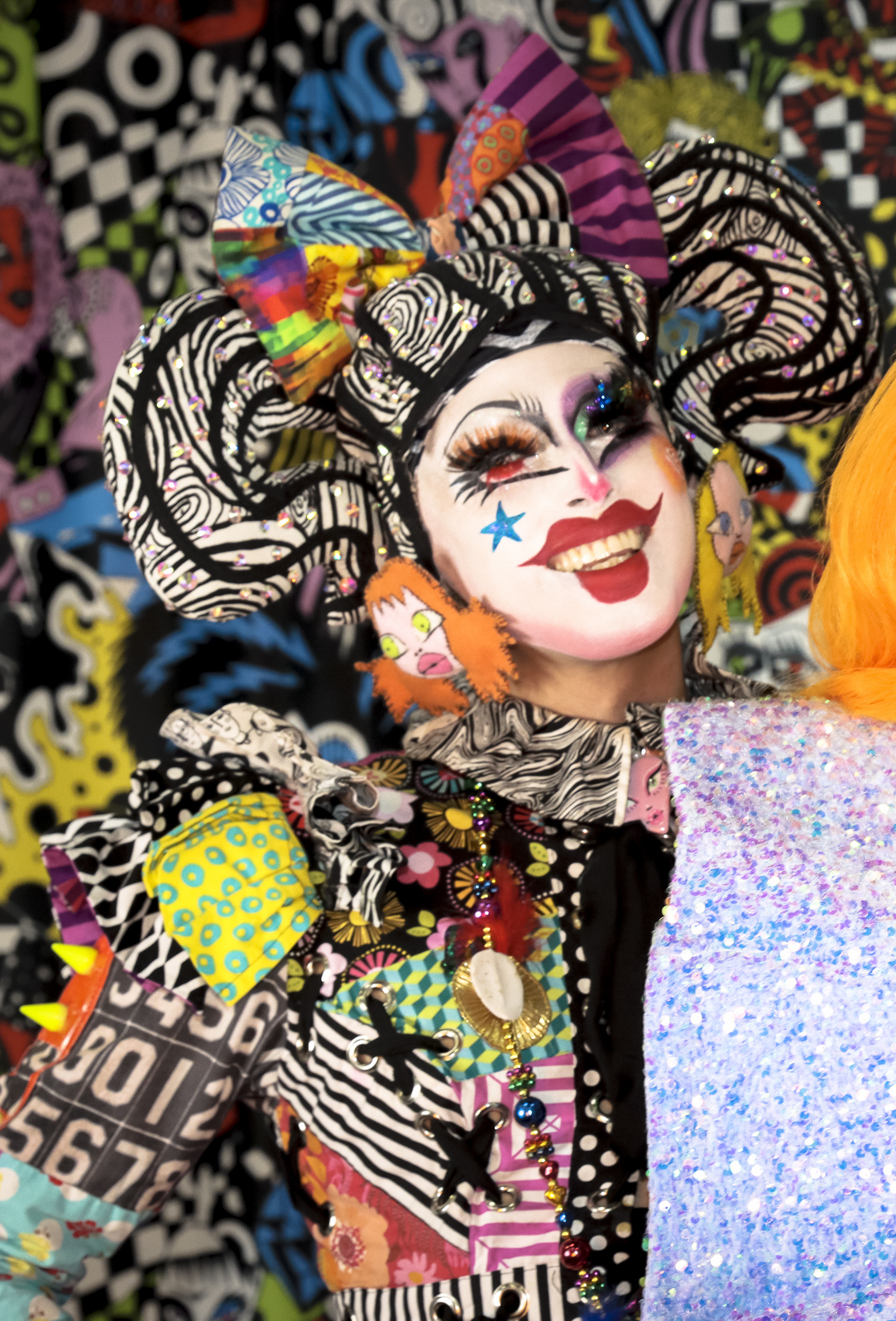
Season 11 winner
Crystal Methyd

Contestants of RuPaul's Drag Race All Stars and their backgrounds
Season	Contestant	Age	Hometown	Original season(s)	Original placement(s)	Outcome
1	Chad Michaels	41	San Diego, California	Season 4	Runner-up	Winner
1	Raven	33	Riverside, California	Season 2	Runner-up	Runner-up
1	Jujubee	28	Boston, Massachusetts	Season 2	3rd	3rd
1	Shannel	32	Las Vegas, Nevada	Season 1	4th	3rd
1	Alexis Mateo	32	Tampa, Florida	Season 3	3rd	5th
1	Yara Sofia	28	Manatí, Puerto Rico	Season 3	4th (Note: The contestant was voted Miss Congeniality on her original season.)	5th
1	Latrice Royale	40	South Beach, Florida	Season 4	4th	7th
1	Manila Luzon	30	New York City, New York	Season 3	Runner-up	7th
1	Nina Flowers	37	Denver, Colorado	Season 1	Runner-up	9th
1	Tammie Brown	32	Long Beach, California	Season 1	8th	9th
1	Mimi Imfurst	29	New York City, New York	Season 3	11th	11th
1	Pandora Boxx	40	Rochester, New York	Season 2	5th	11th
2	Alaska	30	Los Angeles, California	Season 5	Runner-up	Winner
2	Detox	30	Los Angeles, California	Season 5	4th	Runners-up
2	Katya	33	Boston, Massachusetts	Season 7	5th	Runners-up
2	Roxxxy Andrews	31	Orlando, Florida	Season 5	Runner-up	4th
2	Alyssa Edwards	35	Dallas, Texas	Season 5	6th	5th (Note: Alyssa Edwards originally placed sixth before winning re-entry back into the competition.)
2	Tatianna	27	Washington, D.C.	Season 2	4th	6th (Note: Tatianna originally placed eighth before winning re-entry back into the competition.)
2	Phi Phi O'Hara	29	New York City, New York	Season 4	Runner-up	7th
2	Ginger Minj	31	Orlando, Florida	Season 7	Runner-up	8th
2	Adore Delano	25	Azusa, California	Season 6	Runner-up	9th (Note: The contestant quit the competition by either leaving or voting herself out.)
2	Coco Montrese	41	Las Vegas, Nevada	Season 5	5th	10th
3	Trixie Mattel	28	Los Angeles, California	Season 7	6th	Winner
3	Kennedy Davenport	35	Dallas, Texas	Season 7	4th	Runner-up
3	BeBe Zahara Benet	36	Minneapolis, Minnesota	Season 1	Winner	3rd
3	Shangela (Note: Shangela Laquifa Wadley is referred to as her full name on season 2 and as Shangela on season 3 and All Stars 3.)	35	Los Angeles, California	Season 2	12th	3rd
3	Shangela	35	Los Angeles, California	Season 3	6th	3rd
3	Morgan McMichaels	36	Los Angeles, California	Season 2	8th	5th (Note: Morgan McMichaels originally placed tenth before being chosen to return to the competition.)
3	BenDeLaCreme	35	Seattle, Washington	Season 6	5th	6th
3	Aja	23	New York City, New York	Season 9	9th	7th
3	Chi Chi DeVayne†	32	Shreveport, Louisiana	Season 8	4th	8th
3	Milk	29	New York City, New York	Season 6	9th	9th
3	Thorgy Thor	33	New York City, New York	Season 8	6th	10th
4	Monét X Change	28	New York City, New York	Season 10	6th	Winners
4	Trinity the Tuck (Note: Now Trinity the Tuck, she is referred to as Trinity Taylor on season 9.)	33	Orlando, Florida	Season 9	3rd	Winners
4	Monique Heart (Note: Now Mo Heart, she is referred to as Monique Heart on season 10 and All Stars 4.)	32	Kansas City, Missouri	Season 10	8th	3rd
4	Naomi Smalls	24	Redlands, California	Season 8	Runner-up	3rd
4	Latrice Royale	46	South Beach, Florida	Season 4	4th	5th (Note: Latrice Royale originally placed seventh before winning re-entry into the competition.)
4	Latrice Royale	46	South Beach, Florida	All Stars 1	7th	5th
4	Manila Luzon	37	Los Angeles, California	Season 3	Runner-up	6th
4	Manila Luzon	37	Los Angeles, California	All Stars 1	7th	6th
4	Valentina	27	Los Angeles, California	Season 9	7th	7th
4	Gia Gunn	28	Los Angeles, California	Season 6	10th	8th
4	Gia Gunn	28	Los Angeles, California	The Switch 2	Runner-up	8th
4	Farrah Moan	25	Los Angeles, California	Season 9	8th	9th
4	Jasmine Masters	41	Los Angeles, California	Season 7	12th	10th
5	Shea Couleé	30	Chicago, Illinois	Season 9	3rd	Winner
5	Jujubee	34	Boston, Massachusetts	Season 2	3rd	Runners-up
5	Jujubee	34	Boston, Massachusetts	All Stars 1	3rd	Runners-up
5	Miz Cracker	35	New York City, New York	Season 10	5th	Runners-up
5	Blair St. Clair	24	Indianapolis, Indiana	Season 10	9th	4th
5	Alexis Mateo	39	Tampa, Florida	Season 3	3rd	5th
5	Alexis Mateo	39	Tampa, Florida	All Stars 1	5th	5th
5	India Ferrah	33	Las Vegas, Nevada	Season 3	10th	6th
5	Mayhem Miller	37	Riverside, California	Season 10	10th	7th
5	Mariah Paris Balenciaga (Note: Mariah Paris Balenciaga is referred to as Mariah on season 3.)	37	Los Angeles, California	Season 3	9th	8th
5	Ongina	37	Los Angeles, California	Season 1	5th	9th
5	Derrick Barry	35	Las Vegas, Nevada	Season 8	5th	10th
6	Kylie Sonique Love (Note: Now Kylie Sonique Love, she is referred to as Sonique on season 2.)	37	Los Angeles, California	Season 2	9th	Winner
6	Eureka! (Note: Eureka O'Hara is referred to as Eureka on seasons 9 and 10 and Eureka! on All Stars 6.)	30	Los Angeles, California	Season 9	11th (Note: The contestant was removed from the competition due to medical reasons.)	Runner-up (Note: Eureka! originally placed fifth before winning re-entry into the competition.)
6	Eureka!	30	Los Angeles, California	Season 10	Runner-up	Runner-up
6	Ginger Minj	35	Orlando, Florida	Season 7	Runner-up	Runner-up
6	Ginger Minj	35	Orlando, Florida	All Stars 2	8th	Runner-up
6	Ra'Jah O'Hara	35	Dallas, Texas	Season 11	9th	Runner-up
6	Trinity K. Bonet	30	Atlanta, Georgia	Season 6	7th	5th
6	Pandora Boxx	49	Los Angeles, California	Season 2	5th	6th
6	Pandora Boxx	49	Los Angeles, California	All Stars 1	11th	6th
6	Jan	27	New York City, New York	Season 12	8th	7th
6	A'keria C. Davenport	32	Houston, Texas	Season 11	3rd	8th
6	Scarlet Envy	27	New York City, New York	Season 11	10th	9th
6	Yara Sofia	37	Las Vegas, Nevada	Season 3	4th	10th
6	Yara Sofia	37	Las Vegas, Nevada	All Stars 1	5th	10th
6	Silky Nutmeg Ganache	30	Los Angeles, California	Season 11	3rd	11th
6	Jiggly Caliente†	39	New York City, New York	Season 4	8th	12th
6	Serena ChaCha	29	Fort Lauderdale, Florida	Season 5	13th	13th
7	Jinkx Monsoon	33	Portland, Oregon	Season 5	Winner	Winner
7	Monét X Change	31	New York City, New York	Season 10	6th	Runner-up
7	Monét X Change	31	New York City, New York	All Stars 4	Winner	Runner-up
7	Shea Couleé	32	Chicago, Illinois	Season 9	3rd	3rd
7	Shea Couleé	32	Chicago, Illinois	All Stars 5	Winner	3rd
7	Trinity the Tuck	36	Orlando, Florida	Season 9	3rd	3rd
7	Trinity the Tuck	36	Orlando, Florida	All Stars 4	Winner	3rd
7	Raja	47	Los Angeles, California	Season 3	Winner	5th (Note: Raja was crowned "Queen of She Done Already Done Had Herses".)
7	Yvie Oddly	27	Denver, Colorado	Season 11	Winner	6th
7	Jaida Essence Hall	34	Milwaukee, Wisconsin	Season 12	Winner	7th
7	The Vivienne†	29	Liverpool, United Kingdom	UK series 1	Winner	7th
8	Jimbo	39	Victoria, Canada	Canada 1	4th	Winner
8	Jimbo	39	Victoria, Canada	UK vs. the World 1	7th	Winner
8	Kandy Muse	27	New York City, New York	Season 13	Runner-up	Runner-up
8	Jessica Wild	42	Boston, Massachusetts	Season 2	6th	3rd
8	Alexis Michelle	38	New York City, New York	Season 9	5th	4th
8	LaLa Ri	31	Atlanta, Georgia	Season 13	10th	5th (Note: LaLa Ri was crowned "Queen of the Fame Games".)
8	Kahanna Montrese	28	Las Vegas, Nevada	Season 11	14th	6th
8	Jaymes Mansfield	32	Las Vegas, Nevada	Season 9	14th	7th
8	Heidi N Closet	27	Los Angeles, California	Season 12	6th	8th
8	Darienne Lake	50	Rochester, New York	Season 6	4th	9th
8	Mrs. Kasha Davis	51	Rochester, New York	Season 7	11th	10th
8	Naysha Lopez	37	Los Angeles, California	Season 8	9th	11th
8	Monica Beverly Hillz	37	Chicago, Illinois	Season 5	12th	12th
9	Angeria Paris VanMicheals	29	Atlanta, Georgia	Season 14	3rd	Winner
9	Roxxxy Andrews	39	Orlando, Florida	Season 5	Runner-up	Runners-up
9	Roxxxy Andrews	39	Orlando, Florida	All Stars 2	4th	Runners-up
9	Vanessa Vanjie (Note: Vanessa Vanjie is referred to as Vanessa Vanjie Mateo on seasons 10 and 11.)	31	Los Angeles, California	Season 10	14th	Runners-up
9	Vanessa Vanjie	31	Los Angeles, California	Season 11	5th	Runners-up
9	Gottmik	26	Los Angeles, California	Season 13	3rd	4th
9	Jorgeous	23	Los Angeles, California	Season 14	6th	4th
9	Nina West	44	Columbus, Ohio	Season 11	6th	4th
9	Plastique Tiara	26	Dallas, Texas	Season 11	8th	4th
9	Shannel	44	Las Vegas, Nevada	Season 1	4th	4th
9	Shannel	44	Las Vegas, Nevada	All Stars 1	3rd	4th
10	Ginger Minj	39	Orlando, Florida	Season 7	Runner-up	Winner
10	Ginger Minj	39	Orlando, Florida	All Stars 2	8th place	Winner
10	Ginger Minj	39	Orlando, Florida	All Stars 6	Runner-up	Winner
10	Jorgeous	24	Los Angeles, California	Season 14	6th place	Runner-up
10	Jorgeous	24	Los Angeles, California	All Stars 9	4th place	Runner-up
10	Bosco	31	Seattle, Washington	Season 14	3rd place	3rd
10	Lydia B Kollins (Note: Lydia Butthole Kollins is referred to as Lydia B Kollins on the series.)	23	Pittsburgh, Pennsylvania	Season 17	7th place	3rd
10	Aja (Note: Aja Miyake-Mugler, formerly known as Aja LaBeija, is referred to as Aja on the show.)	30	Brooklyn, New York	Season 9	9th place	5th (Note: Kerri Colby originally placed tenth before re-entering the competition.)
10	Aja	30	Brooklyn, New York	All Stars 3	7th place	5th
10	Daya Betty	28	Chicago, Illinois	Season 14	3rd place	5th
10	Irene the Alien (Note: Now Irene the Alien, she is referred to as Irene Dubois on season 15.)	30	Seattle, Washington	Season 15	16th place	5th
10	Kerri Colby	27	Los Angeles, California	Season 14	9th place	5th
10	Mistress Isabelle Brooks	25	Houston, Texas	Season 15	3rd place	9th
10	Cynthia Lee Fontaine	43	Austin, Texas	Season 8	10th place	10th
10	Cynthia Lee Fontaine	43	Austin, Texas	Season 9	10th place	10th
10	Acid Betty	46	Brooklyn, New York	Season 8	8th place	11th
10	Alyssa Hunter	31	Cataño, Puerto Rico	Season 14	13th place	11th
10	Denali	32	Chicago, Illinois	Season 13	8th place	11th
10	Nicole Paige Brooks	50	Atlanta, Georgia	Season 2	11th place	11th
10	Tina Burner	43	New York City, New York	Season 13	7th place	11th
10	DeJa Skye	34	Las Vegas, Nevada	Season 14	6th place	11th
10	Olivia Lux	31	New York City, New York	Season 13	5th place	11th
10	Phoenix	43	Atlanta, Georgia	Season 3	12th place	11th
11	Crystal Methyd	35	Los Angeles, California	Season 12	Runner-up	Winner
11	Joey Jay	35	Phoenix, Arizona	Season 13	12th Place	Runner-up (Note: Joey Jay originally placed eighth before re-entering the competition.)
11	Jasmine Kennedie	26	New York City, New York	Season 14	8th place	3rd
11	Silky Nutmeg Ganache	35	Houston, Texas	Season 11	3rd place	3rd
11	Silky Nutmeg Ganache	35	Houston, Texas	All Stars 6	11th place	3rd
11	Silky Nutmeg Ganache	35	Houston, Texas	Canada vs. the World 1	Runner-up	3rd
11	A'keria C. Davenport	38	Dallas, Texas	Season 11	3rd place	5th
11	A'keria C. Davenport	38	Dallas, Texas	All Stars 6	8th place	5th
11	Dawn	28	New York City, New York	Season 16	6th place	5th
11	Sam Star	26	Leeds, Alabama	Season 17	3rd place	7th
11	Kennedy Davenport	43	Dallas, Texas	Season 7	4th place	8th
11	Kennedy Davenport	43	Dallas, Texas	All Stars 3	Runner-up	8th
11	Kennedy Davenport	43	Dallas, Texas	Canada vs. the World 2	3rd place	8th
11	April Carrión	36	Los Angeles, California	Season 6	11th place	9th
11	Aura Mayari	35	Nashville, Tennessee	Season 15	11th place	9th
11	Hershii LiqCour-Jeté	35	Los Angeles, California	Season 16	14th place	9th
11	Lucky Starzzz	28	Miami, Florida	Season 17	14th place	9th
11	Morgan McMichaels	44	Los Angeles, California	Season 2	8th place	9th
11	Morgan McMichaels	44	Los Angeles, California	All Stars 3	5th place	9th
11	Morphine Love Dion	29	Miami, Florida	Season 16	5th place	9th
11	Mystique Summers	42	Fort Worth, Texas	Season 2	10th place	9th
11	Salina EsTitties	35	Los Angeles, California	Season 15	6th place	9th
11	Shuga Cain	48	New York City, New York	Season 11	7th place	9th
11	Vivacious	52	New York City, New York	Season 6	12th place	9th

== Deaths ==
- Chi Chi DeVayne (September 24, 1985 – August 20, 2020; aged 34), Season 3 contestant (8th place).
- The Vivienne (April 12, 1992 – January 3, 2025; aged 32), Season 7 contestant (7th place).
- Jiggly Caliente (November 29, 1980 – April 27, 2025; aged 44), Season 6 contestant (12th place).
