= RuPaul's Drag Race All Stars =

American reality competition television series (since 2012)

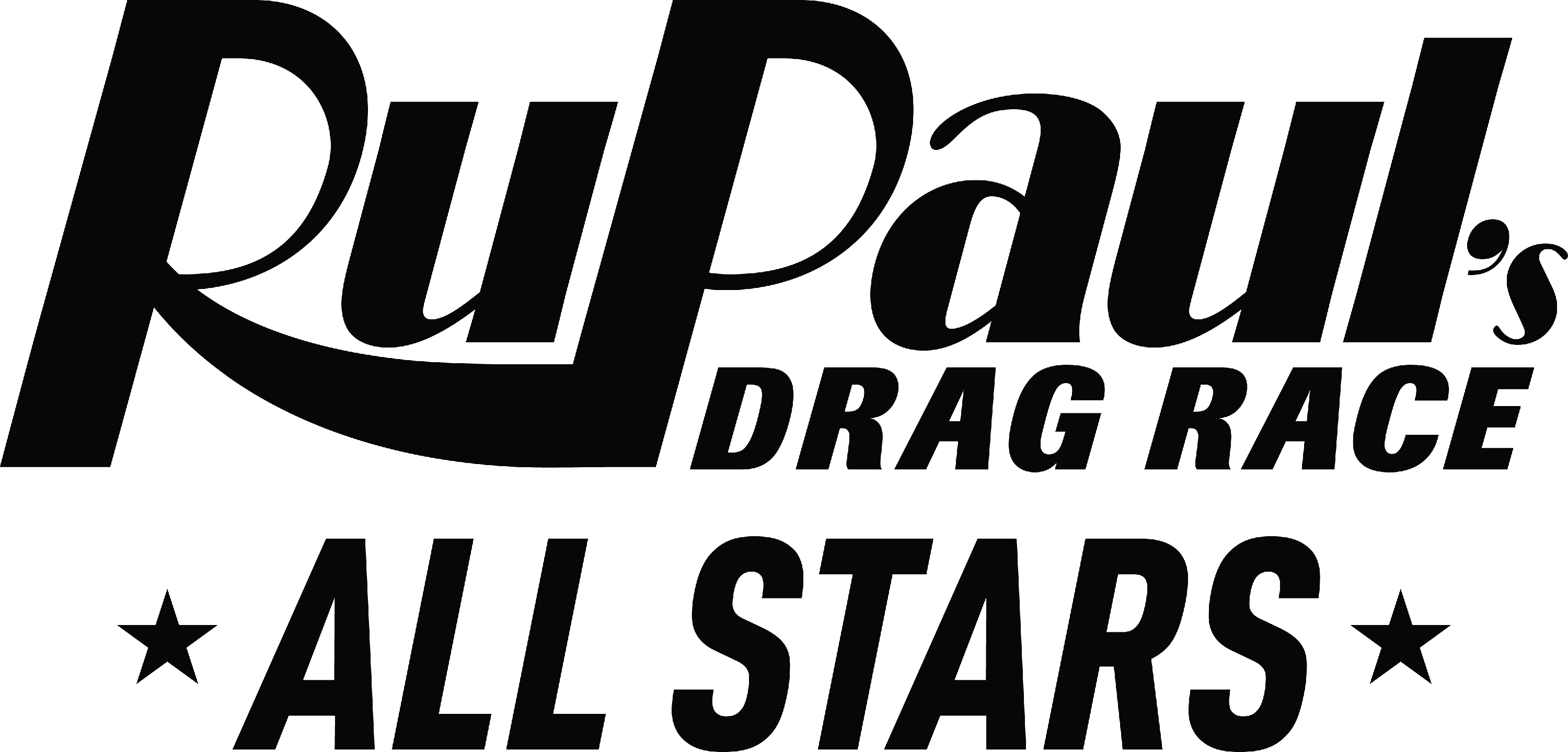
- Genre: Reality competition
- Directed by: Nick Murray
- Presented by: RuPaul
- Starring: RuPaul's Drag Race All Stars contestants
- Judges: RuPaul; Michelle Visage; Santino Rice; Carson Kressley; Todrick Hall; Ross Mathews; Ts Madison; Law Roach
- Theme music composer: RuPaul; Lucian Piane
- Opening theme: "RuPaul's Drag Race" theme
- Ending theme: List: "Responsitrannity" (season 1); "Throw Ya Hands Up" (season 2); "Charisma, Uniqueness, Nerve & Talent" (season 3); "Born Naked (Stadium Remix)" (season 4); "American" (season 5); "Condragulations" (season 6); "Cover Girl (Macutchi's TaterZ DeeP Edit)" (season 7); "A Little Bit of Love" (season 8); "Just What They Want" (season 9); "A.S.M.R Lover" (season 10)
- Country of origin: United States
- Original language: English
- No. of seasons: 11
- No. of episodes: 113 (list of episodes)

Production
- Executive producers: Fenton Bailey; Randy Barbato; Tom Campbell; RuPaul; Steven Corfe; Pamela Post; Mandy Salangsang
- Camera setup: Multi-camera
- Running time: 42–62 minutes
- Production company: World of Wonder Productions

Original release
- Network: Logo TV
- Release: October 22, 2012 – October 27, 2016
- Network: VH1
- Release: January 25, 2018 – July 24, 2020
- Network: Paramount+
- Release: June 24, 2021 – present

Related
- RuPaul's Drag Race

RuPaul's Drag Race All Stars is an American reality competition spin off all stars edition of the original RuPaul's Drag Race, which is produced by World of Wonder, for Logo TV and later VH1. The show premiered on October 22, 2012, on Logo TV, before relocating to VH1. However, it was announced on February 20, 2020, on the show's official Twitter account that the fifth season would premiere on June 5, 2020, on Showtime. Following the cast announcement on May 8, 2020, producers announced that the show would remain airing on VH1 instead of Showtime due to the COVID-19 pandemic which caused "various scheduling and programming adjustments". On February 24, 2021, Paramount+ announced via Twitter that the streaming service would be the new home to the series for the sixth season.

The show documents past queens from the Drag Race franchise (primarily from the original series) returning to compete at the invitation of RuPaul. As in the original series, RuPaul plays the role of host, mentor, and head judge and contestants are given different challenges each week. RuPaul's Drag Race All Stars employs a panel of judges currently composed of RuPaul, Michelle Visage, Carson Kressley, Ross Mathews, Ts Madison, and Law Roach, who, along with a host of guest judges, critique contestants' progress throughout the competition. The winner of each season is awarded a cash prize and a spot in the Drag Race Hall of Fame. A notable exception is the seventh season where, due to the cast consisting of previous winners of the franchise, the winner was instead crowned as "Queen of All Queens".

== Format ==
For the most part, the format of the All Star Drag Race resembles that of the main series - with each episode consisting of a maxi challenge (which determines who is eligible for elimination), and a lip-sync (which determines who is eliminated). However, each cast is composed of former contestants and the format for the competition is altered, with most seasons featuring a format in which the Queens themselves have a say in the judging and elimination process.

=== Format Variation ===
The main differences in format to the main series are as follows:

- Season 1: The first All-Stars season was a pairs competition. Queens competed in teams of two, determined by the contestants themselves. Both members of the losing team would be eliminated each week. The bottom two teams chose one member to "lip-synch for their lives". The non-lip synching teammates had the option during the first minute of the performance to declare a "she-mergency", hit a panic button, and "tag in" to complete the performance. In the finale, two pairs remained, at which point the pairs were disbanded.
- Seasons 2–4: The second season was an individual format much like the main series and introduced the format of having the contestants eliminating each other. This season also introduced the lip-sync for your legacy, where the top two contestants in each main challenge would compete in the lip-sync. The victor is awarded a cash prize of $10,000 and the power to eliminate any of the worst-performing queens from the main challenge. This format returned in the third and fourth seasons as well.
- Seasons 5–6, 8: The fifth season made a minor adjustment to the format from seasons 2–4. Only the sole main challenge winner can lip sync for her legacy against a Lip Sync Assassin (a contestant from a previous season considered to be great at lip syncs), while the bottom queens are the only ones eligible for elimination. If the Assassin wins, the eliminated queen will be determined by a vote by the rest of the contestants. The $10,000 lip sync prize jackpot rolls over to further episodes until an All-Star queen wins a lip-sync. If the competing All-Star wins the lip sync, she will get the power to eliminate a bottom queen, as well as win a jackpotting cash prize. This format returned in the sixth and eighth seasons.
- Seasons 7, 9: The seventh season featured past winners from the franchise returning to compete and no contestants were eliminated prior to the final stage of the competition. The top two queens in each main challenge are awarded a "Legendary Legend Star" and compete in a lip-sync for the win. The winner of the lip-sync receives a cash prize and the ability to block one of the safe queens from receiving a star the following week. The 4 contestants with the most stars at the end of the competition are eligible for the title "Queen of All Queens", which then participate in a Lip Sync For The Crown tournament. The ninth season featured the same format from Season 7, however, it did not feature a cast of past winners, stars were replaced with "Beautiful Benefactress Badges", there are only a top 3 will be moving on to the finale and queens competed for a spot in the "Drag Race Hall of Fame" and money for the charity of their choice.
- Season 10–11: The tenth season introduces the bracket tournament format, where three groups of six competitors are narrowed down to the top three using a points system, over three competitive episodes per group. The top three queens of each group merged to form the semi-finalist group of 9 queens. This was followed by two competitive episodes ending with a Lip Sync For Your Life. In the finale, the remaining 7 queens, plus one previously eliminated "wild card" contestant chosen by the judgers, competed in a lip-sync smackdown for the crown. The eleventh season featured the same format, however only the top two queens from each bracket advanced to the semi-finals.

=== Judging ===
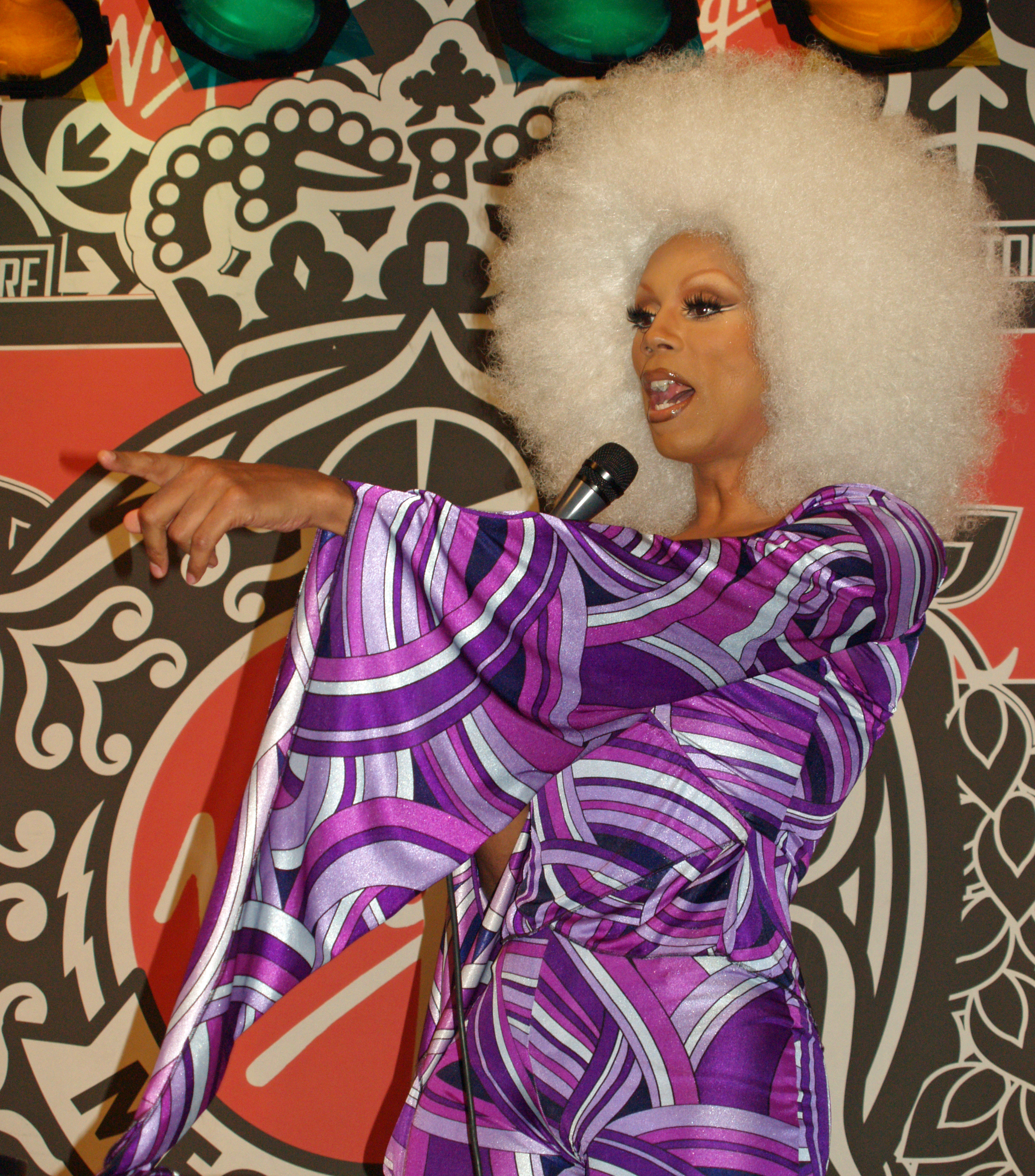
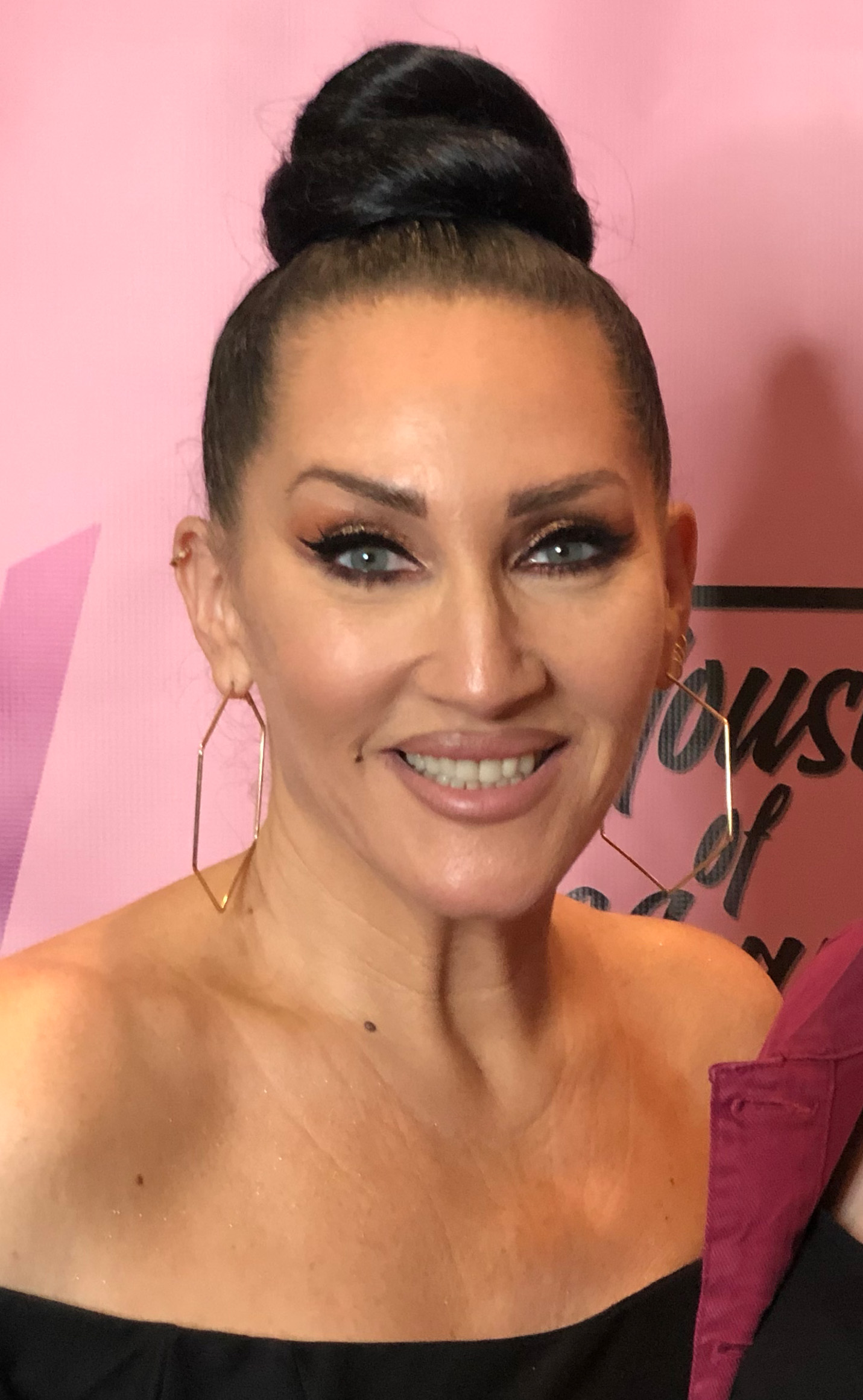
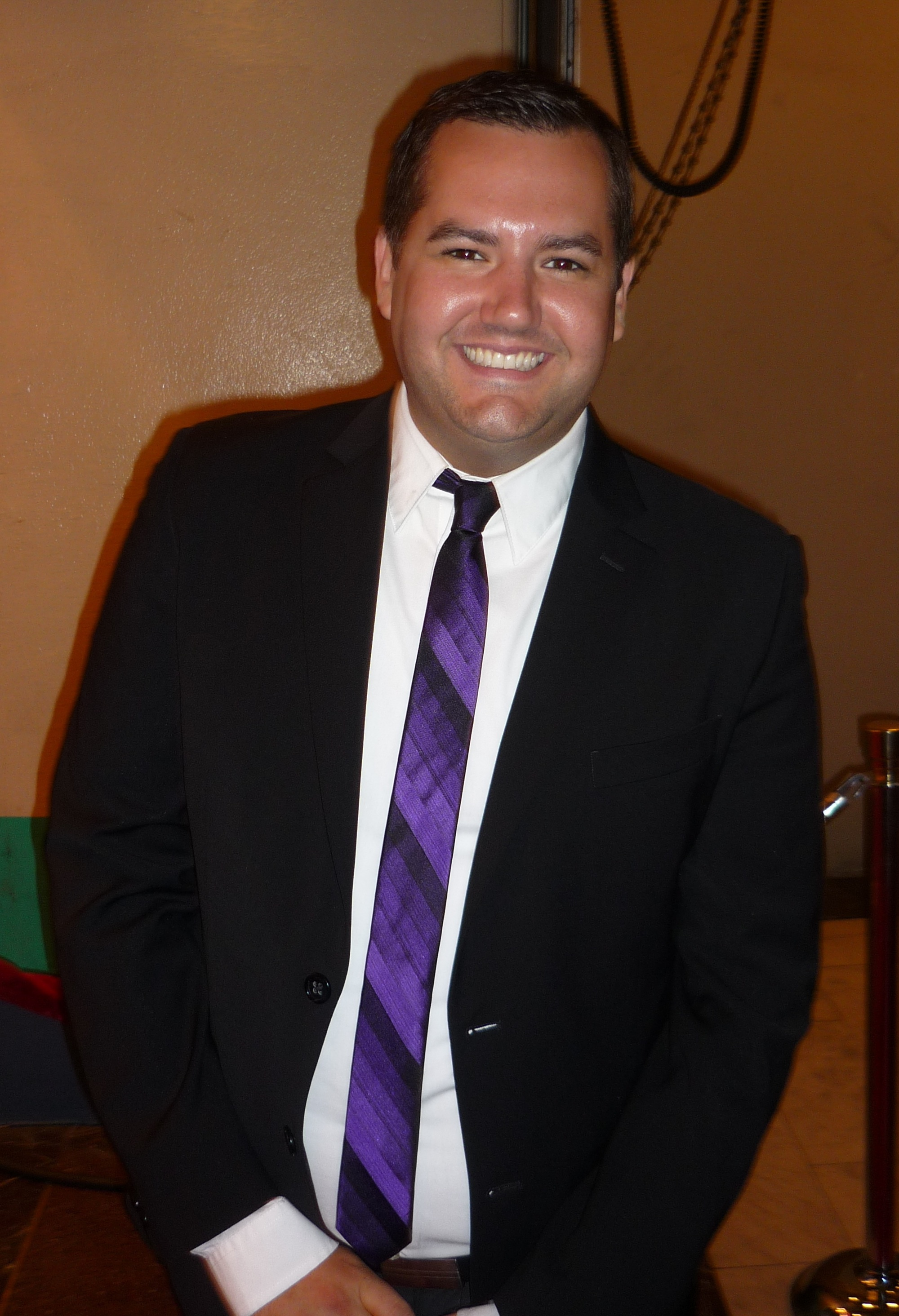
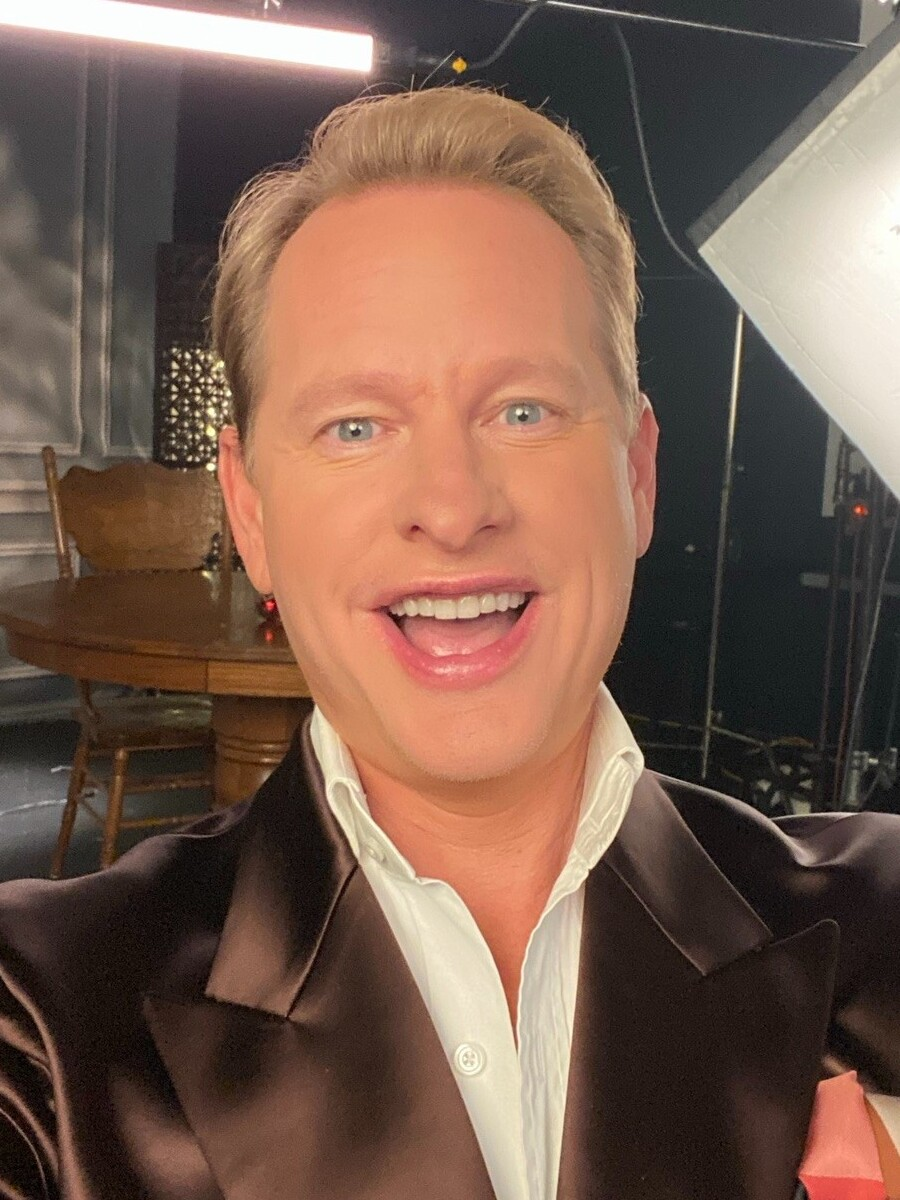
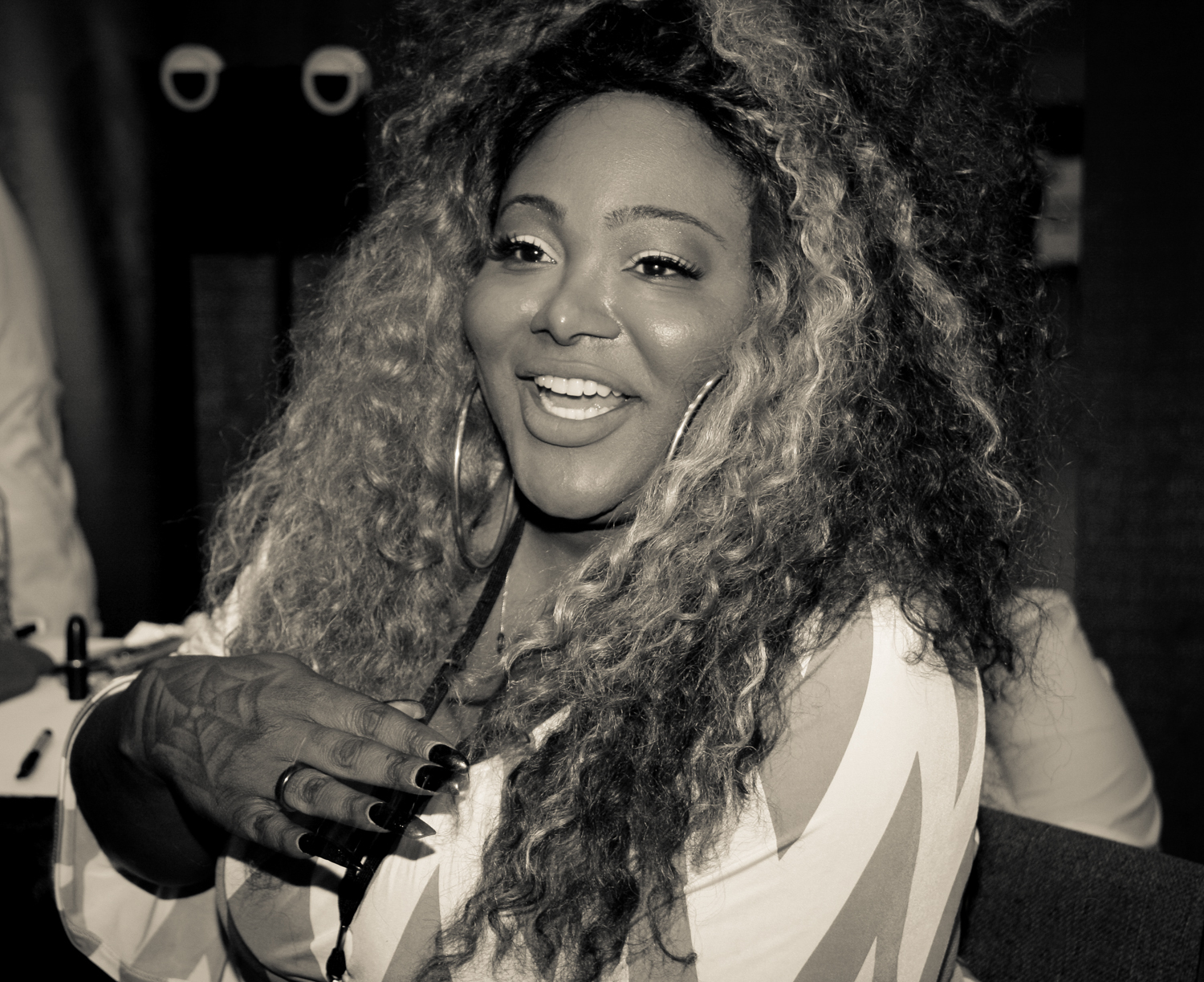
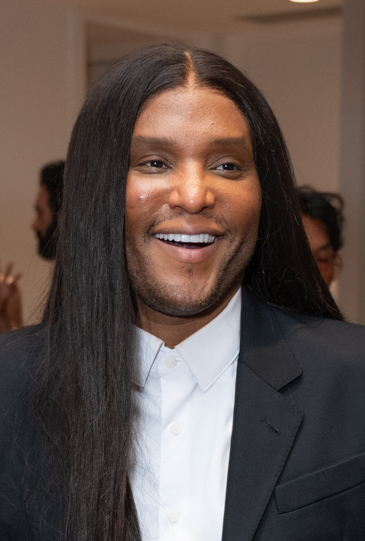
RuPaul, Michelle Visage, Ross Mathews (top row), Carson Kressley, Ts Madison, and Law Roach (bottom row), as current judges

Judges on RuPaul's Drag Race All Stars
Judge	Season										
Judge	1	2	3	4	5	6	7	8	9	10	11
RuPaul	Main	Main	Main	Main	Main	Main	Main	Main	Main	Main	Main
Michelle Visage	Main	Main	Main	Main	Main	Main	Main	Main	Main	Main	Main
Santino Rice	Main										
Carson Kressley		Altern	Altern	Altern	Altern	Altern	Altern	Altern	Altern	Altern	Altern
Todrick Hall		Main	Guest	Guest	Guest						
Ross Mathews	Guest	Guest	Altern	Altern	Altern	Altern	Altern	Altern	Altern	Altern	Altern
Ts Madison								Altern	Altern	Altern	Altern
Law Roach										Altern	Altern
Jamal Sims						Guest				Guest	Altern

== Series overview ==
Season	Contestants	Episodes	Originally released			Winner(s)	Runner(s)-up
Season	Contestants	Episodes	First released	Last released	Network	Winner(s)	Runner(s)-up
1	12	6	October 22, 2012	November 26, 2012	Logo TV	Chad Michaels	Raven
2	10	9	August 25, 2016	October 27, 2016	Logo TV	Alaska	Detox; Katya
3	10	8	January 25, 2018	March 15, 2018	VH1	Trixie Mattel	Kennedy Davenport
4	10	10	December 14, 2018	February 15, 2019	VH1	Monét X Change; Trinity the Tuck	—N/a
5	10	8	June 5, 2020	July 24, 2020	VH1	Shea Couleé	Jujubee; Miz Cracker
6	13	12	June 24, 2021	September 2, 2021	Paramount+	Kylie Sonique Love	Eureka! Ginger Minj; Ra'Jah O'Hara
7	8	12	May 20, 2022	July 29, 2022	Paramount+	Jinkx Monsoon	Monét X Change
8	12	12	May 12, 2023	July 21, 2023	Paramount+	Jimbo	Kandy Muse
9	8	12	May 17, 2024	July 26, 2024	Paramount+	Angeria Paris VanMicheals	Roxxxy Andrews; Vanessa Vanjie
10	18	12	May 9, 2025	July 18, 2025	Paramount+	Ginger Minj	Jorgeous
11	18	12	May 8, 2026	July 17, 2026	Paramount+	Crystal Methyd	Joey Jay

=== Seasons 1–2 (2012–2016): Logo TV ===
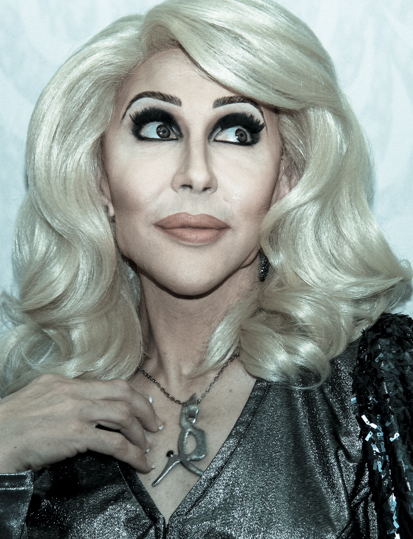
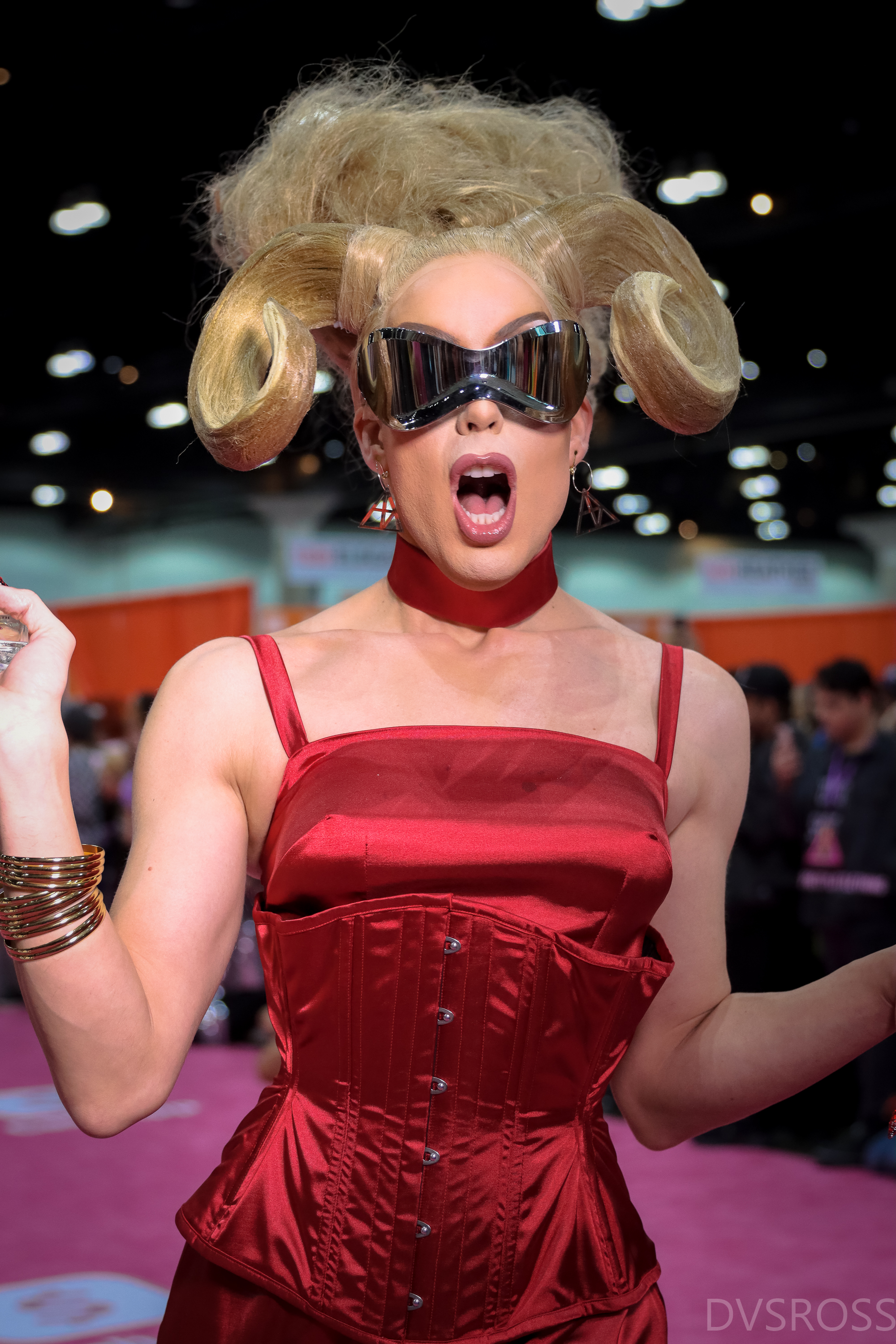
Chad Michaels (left) and Alaska Thunderfuck (right), the winners of seasons 1 and 2, respectively

RuPaul's Drag Race: All Stars is the first All-Star season of RuPaul's Drag Race and premiered on the Logo network on October 22, 2012. Cast members were announced on August 6, 2012. The queens that were invited back to compete were: Alexis Mateo, Chad Michaels, Jujubee, Latrice Royale, Manila Luzon, Mimi Imfurst, Nina Flowers, Pandora Boxx, Raven, Shannel, Tammie Brown and Yara Sofia. The season featured these twelve returning contestants from seasons one to four, for a chance to be inducted into the "Drag Race Hall of Fame". It is the only season of All Stars to have the contestants compete in teams of two. This series consists of six episodes, each aired in a 60-minute time-slot. Contestants were judged on their "charisma, uniqueness, nerve and talent" and, since they competed in teams of two, also "synergy". The winner received a supply of MAC cosmetics, a "one of a kind trip" and $100,000.

In each episode, the judges provide their critiques on the contestants' performances in the main challenge and on the runway before RuPaul announces which team is the winner and which teams had the weakest performances. The teams deemed as being the bottom two must "lip sync for their lives" and choose a queen to represent their team in the lip sync in a final attempt to impress RuPaul. After the lip sync, RuPaul decides who stays and who leaves. RuPaul describes the qualities the contestants must have to be crowned the winner of the show as "Charisma, Uniqueness, Nerve, and Talent... These are people who have taken adversity and turned it into something that is beautiful and something powerful." The phrase "charisma, uniqueness, nerve, and talent" is used repeatedly on the show, the acronym of which is CUNT. This season, "synergy" was added to provide an explanation behind the contestants being sorted into teams (expanding the acronym into CUNTS). The winner was Chad Michaels, while Raven placed as the runner-up, again.

A second season of All Stars was announced in 2015 and started shooting immediately after season 8. The show was to begin airing on August 25, 2016. Along with the season premiere's announcement, the cast of All Stars 2 were revealed. The cast consisted of 10 returning contestants, Adore Delano, Alaska, Alyssa Edwards, Coco Montrese, Detox, Ginger Minj, Katya, Phi Phi O'Hara, Roxxxy Andrews, and Tatianna. A new twist was revealed for this season changing the format of the show. In previous seasons, the two lowest performing queens had to "Lip Sync for their Life" to avoid elimination. This season has the two best-performing queens of the challenge "Lip Sync for their Legacy", with the winner of the lip sync earning $10,000 and choosing which one of the bottom queens to eliminate. However, on their exit, RuPaul advised the first four eliminated queens that they will have the opportunity to come back for their "revenge", with the winner gaining entry back into the competition.

This season featured a lip-sync to the Rihanna song 'Shut Up and Drive' by Alyssa Edwards and Tatianna that has frequently been rated the number one best Drag Race lip-sync performance. The winner was Alaska, while Detox and Katya placed as the runners-up.

=== Seasons 3–5 (2018–2020): VH1 ===
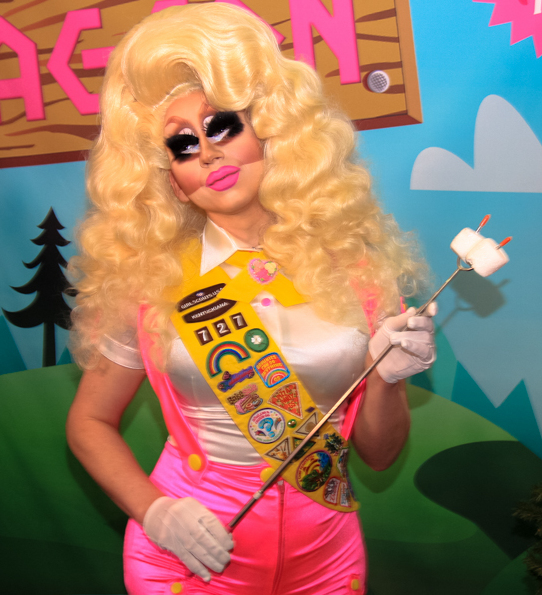
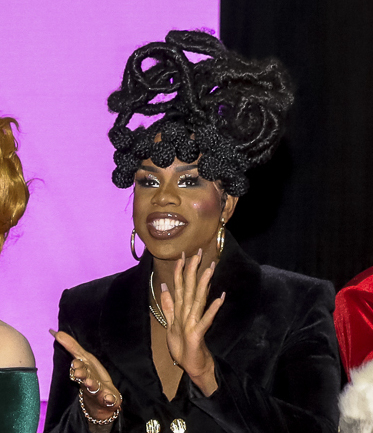
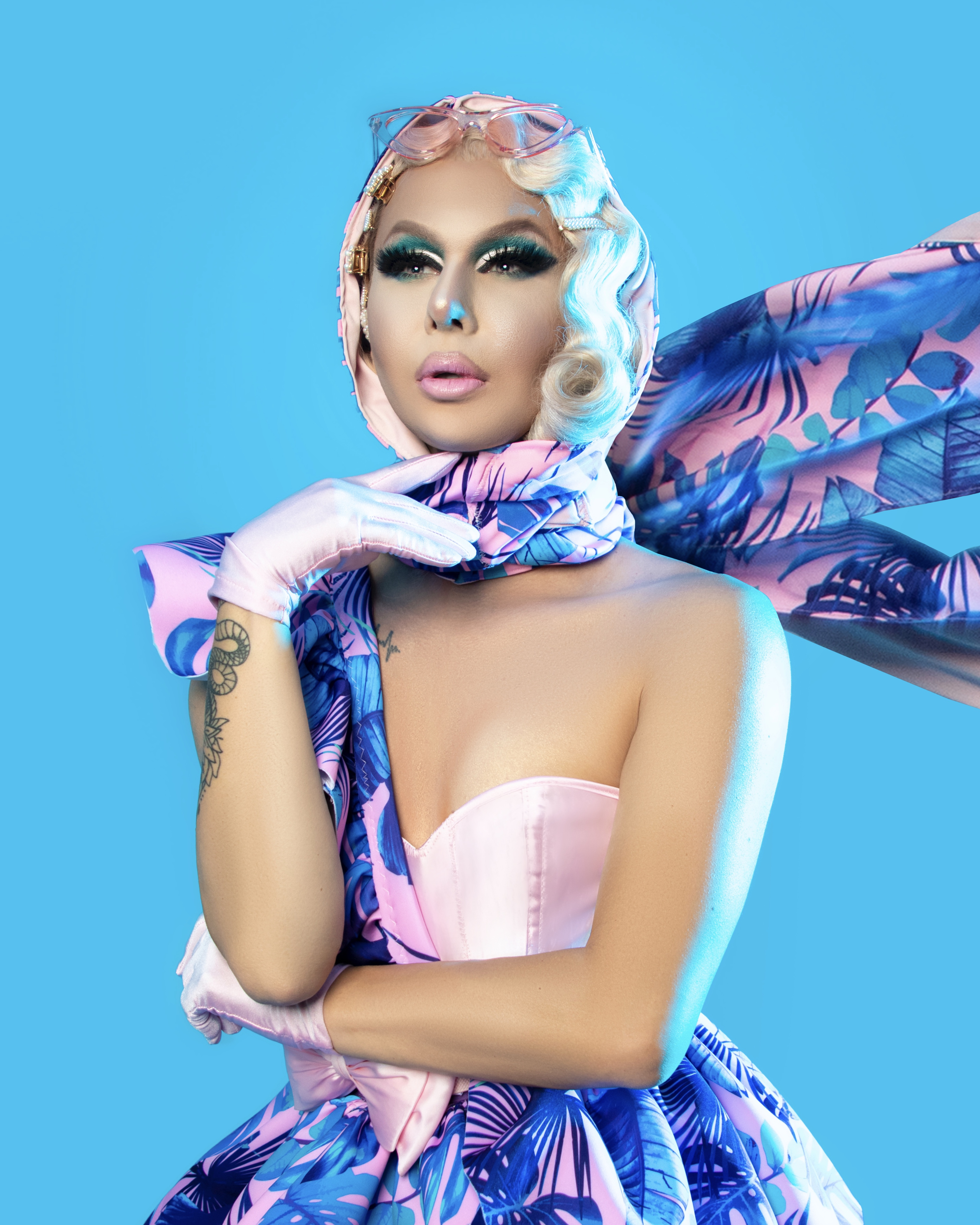
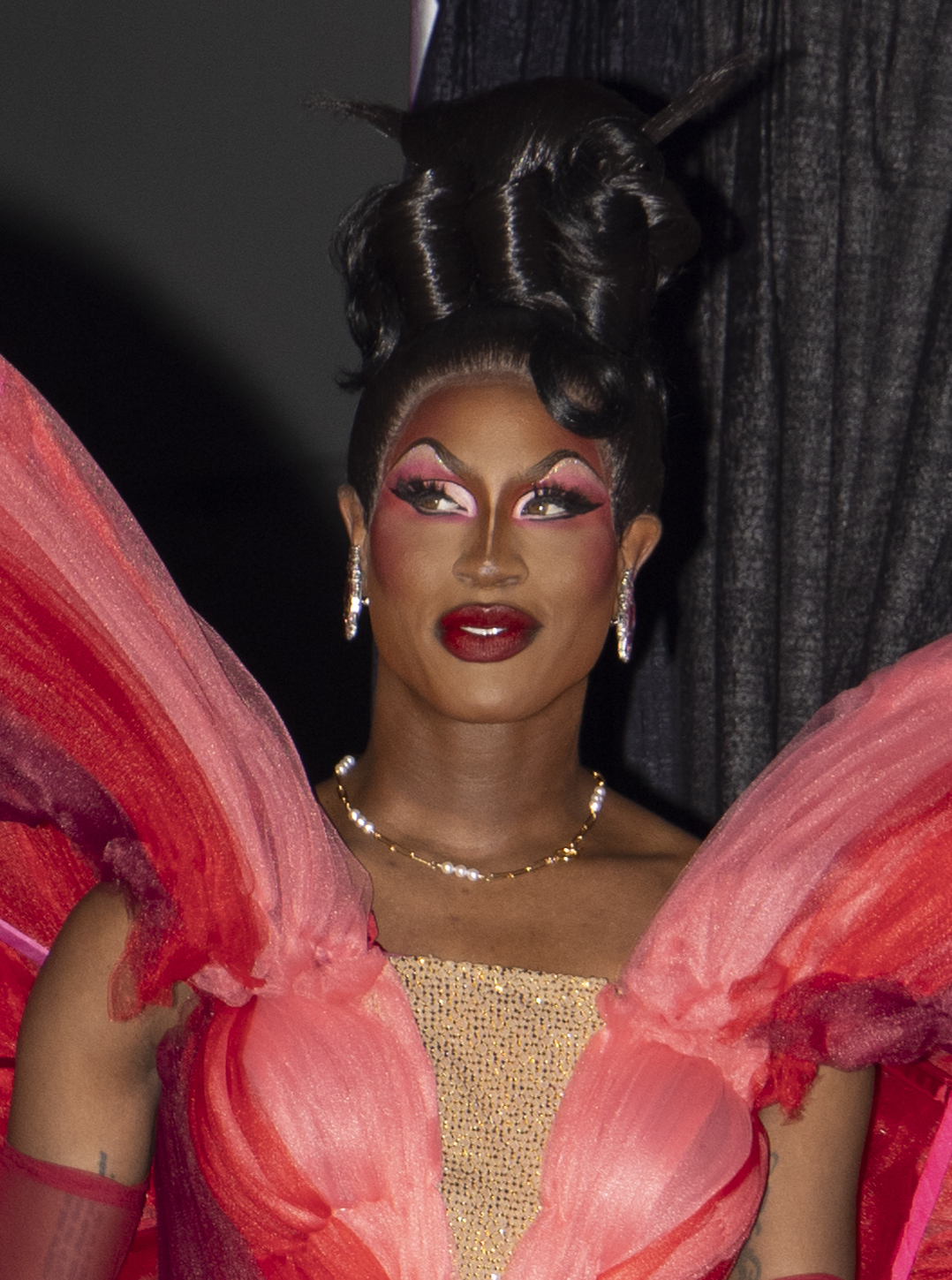
Trixie Mattel (top left), Monét X Change (top right), Trinity the Tuck (bottom left), and Shea Couleé (bottom right), the winners of seasons 3, 4, and 5, respectively

On August 21, 2017, VH1 announced it would air a third season of the series in early 2018. On October 13, 2017, VH1 announced that a one-hour special, RuPaul's Drag Race All Stars Exclusive Queen RuVeal, would air on October 20, 2017, announcing the season's returning contestants. The contestants competing on the third season of All Stars were Aja, BenDeLaCreme, Chi Chi DeVayne, Kennedy Davenport, Milk, Morgan McMichaels, Shangela, Thorgy Thor, and Trixie Mattel. Season one winner BeBe Zahara Benet was announced as the surprise tenth contestant. On December 14, 2017, it was announced that the third season would premiere on January 25, 2018. A new twist on how the top queens of the season were to be chosen was revealed in the season's final episode. The previously eliminated queens returned in the finale and voted for the top two out of the remaining top four finalists. The two queens with the most votes advanced while the others were eliminated. The winner was Trixie Mattel; Kennedy Davenport was the runner-up.

In August 2018, during an episode of his podcast, Whats the Tee?, RuPaul confirmed he was filming the fourth season of All Stars. On August 22, 2018, VH1 officially announced a fourth season of All Stars, with the cast still yet to be revealed. On November 9, season 3 winner Trixie Mattel hosted a live stream with season 2 finalists Katya and Detox to announce the cast. The ten contestants competing on the fourth season of All Stars were Farrah Moan, Gia Gunn, Jasmine Masters, Latrice Royale, Manila Luzon, Monét X Change, Monique Heart, Naomi Smalls, Trinity the Tuck, and Valentina. Gia Gunn was the first transgender contestant to compete on a season of All Stars, while Latrice Royale and Manila Luzon were the first contestants to return after competing in a previous season of All Stars. The fourth season premiered on December 14, 2018, on VH1. The winners were Trinity the Tuck and Monét X Change; this marked the first double crowning in the ‘’Drag Race’’ franchise.

On August 19, 2019, it was announced that the series had been renewed for a fifth season. It was announced on February 20, 2020, on the show's official Twitter account, that the season would premiere on June 5, 2020, on Showtime. The cast was revealed on May 8, 2020. Following the cast announcement, producers announced that the show will air on VH1 instead of Showtime due to the COVID-19 pandemic which caused "various scheduling and programming adjustments." The ten contestants competing that season were Alexis Mateo, Blair St. Clair, Derrick Barry, India Ferrah, Jujubee, Mariah Paris Balenciaga, Mayhem Miller, Miz Cracker, Ongina, and Shea Couleé. The winner was Shea Couleé, leaving Jujubee and Miz Cracker as the runners-up.

=== Seasons 6–10 (2021–present): Paramount+ ===
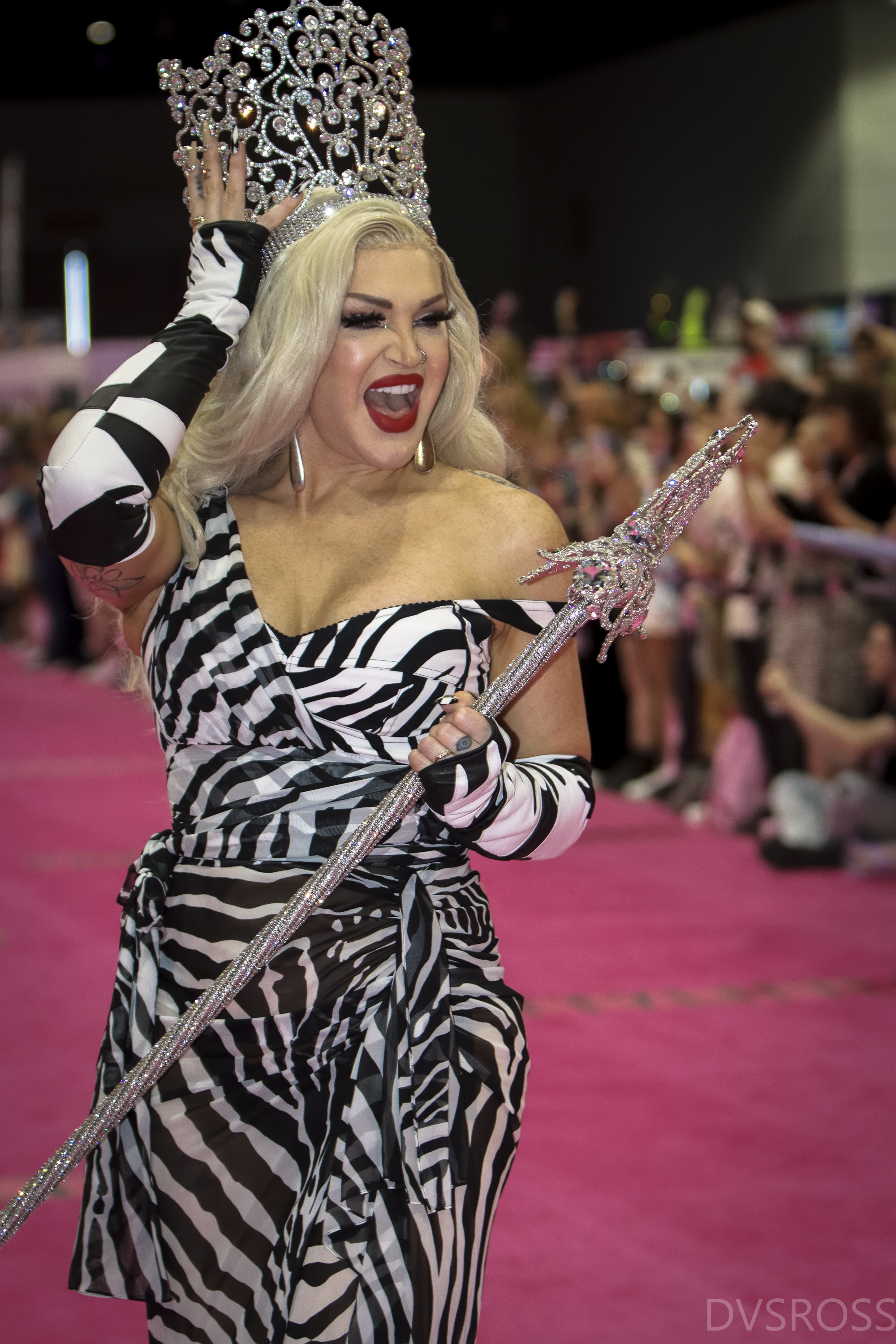
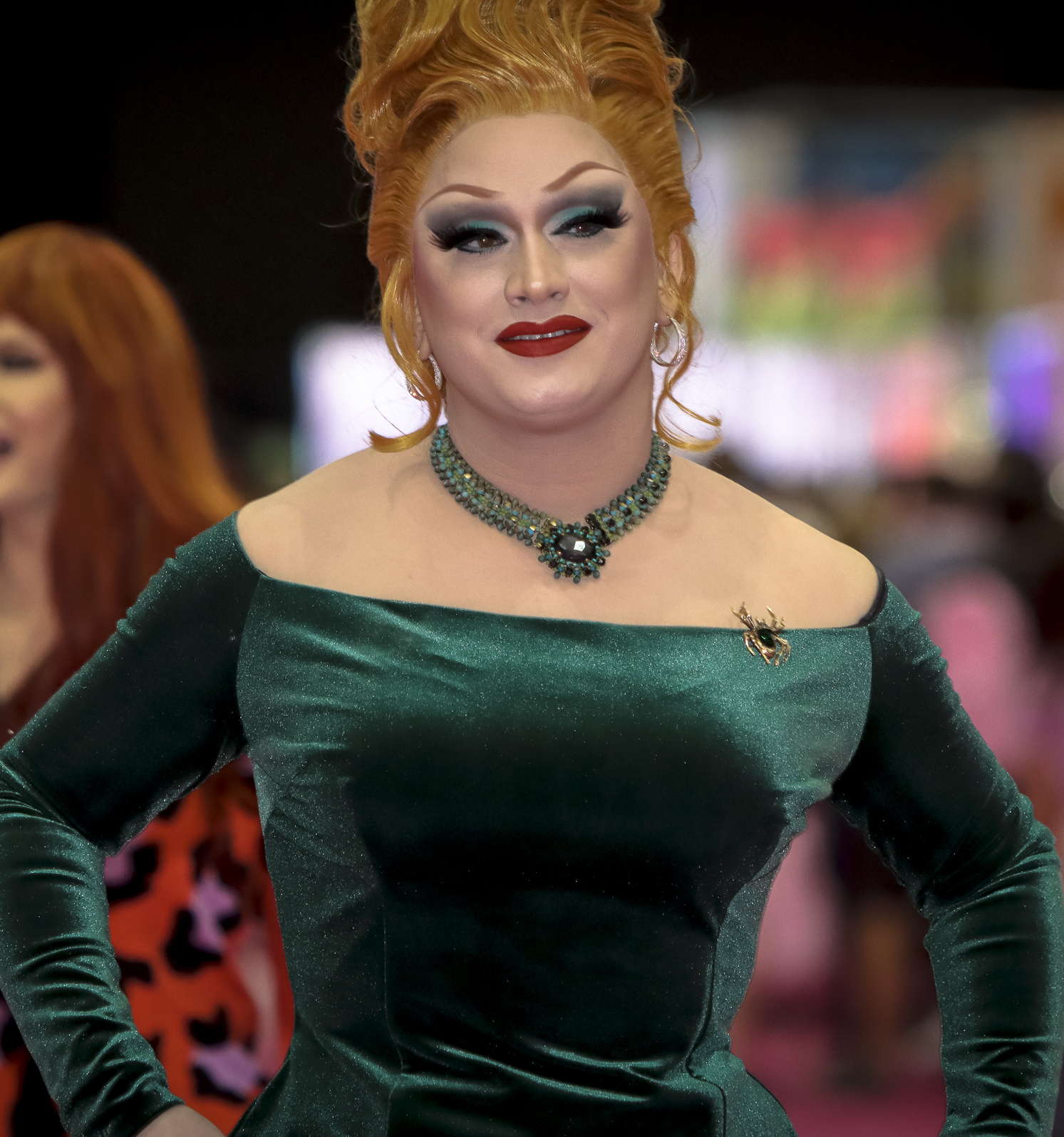
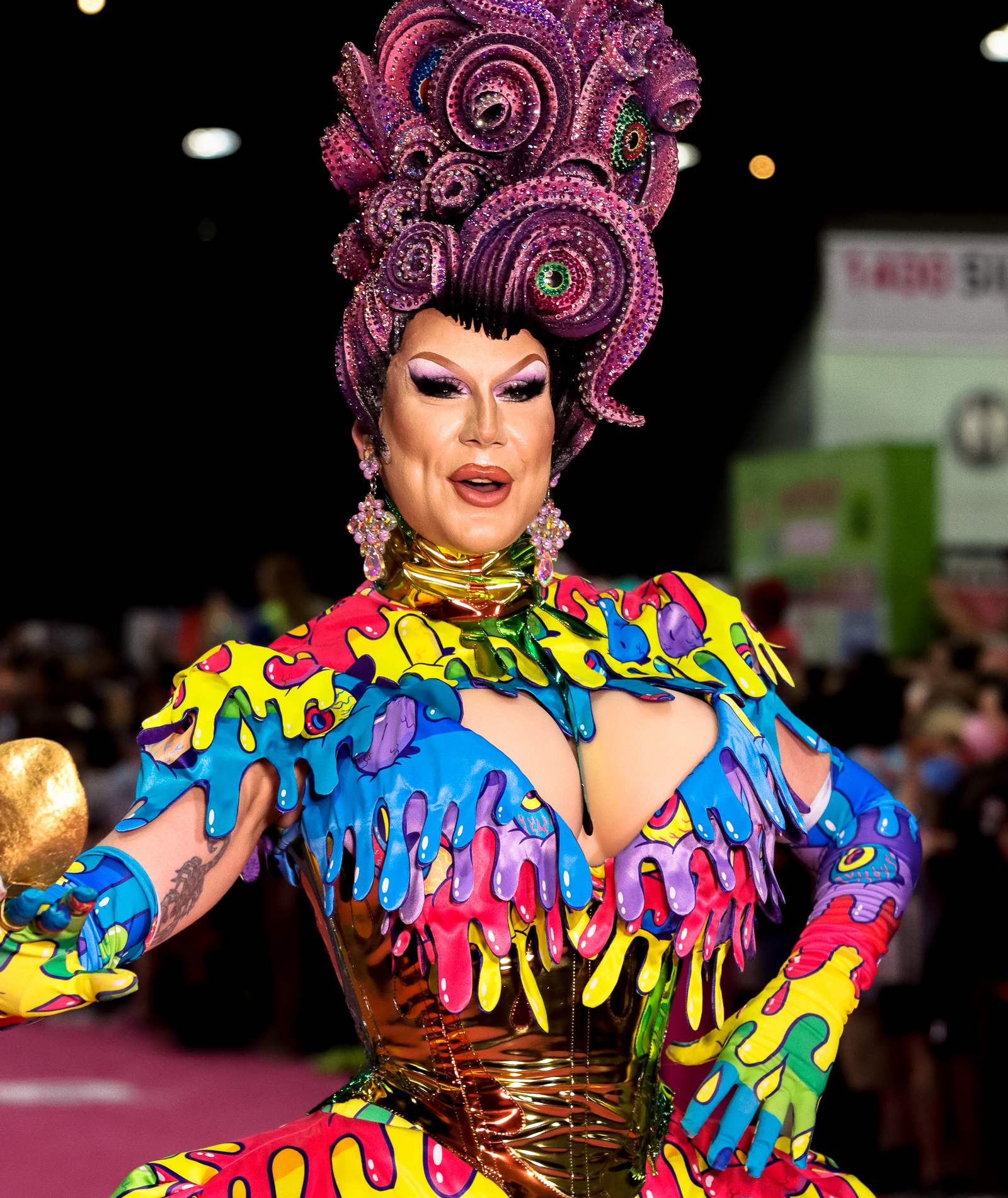
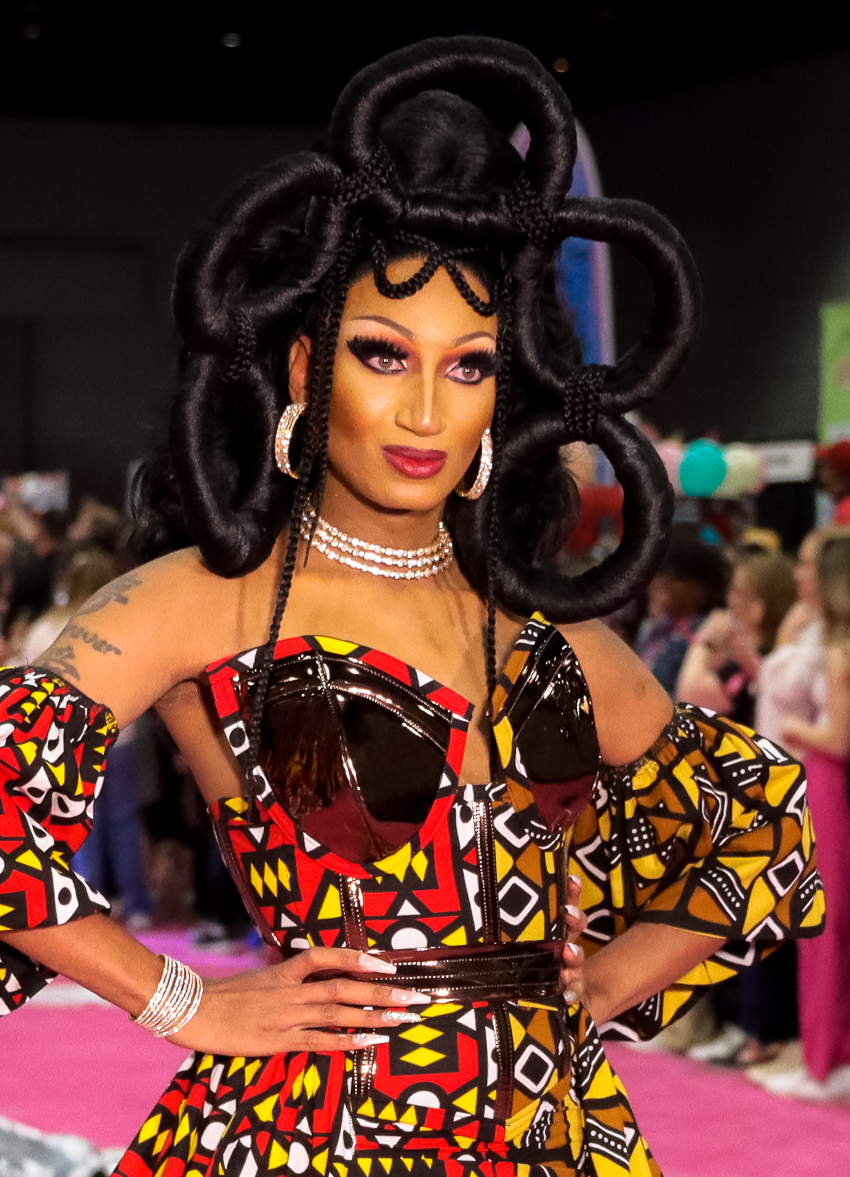
Kylie Sonique Love (top left), Jinkx Monsoon (top right), Jimbo (bottom left), and Angeria Paris VanMicheals (bottom right), the winners of seasons 6, 7, 8, and 9, respectively

On August 20, 2020, VH1 renewed the series for its sixth season. On February 24, 2021, ViacomCBS announced that the sixth season of the show would move to Paramount+. On May 26, it was announced that the season would air beginning June 24, 2021. The season's thirteen contestants were A'keria C. Davenport, Eureka!, Ginger Minj, Jan, Jiggly Caliente, Kylie Sonique Love, Pandora Boxx, Ra'Jah O'Hara, Scarlet Envy, Serena ChaCha, Silky Nutmeg Ganache, Trinity K. Bonet, and Yara Sofia. The winner was Kylie Sonique Love, leaving Eureka!, Ginger Minj, and Ra'Jah O'Hara as runners-up. Kylie made history as the first transgender queen to win the crown on the American version of the show.

The series was renewed for its seventh season on February 15, 2022, to be aired on Paramount+. The cast was announced on April 13, 2022. It included eight winners of past seasons returning to compete, making it the first season featuring only past winners. It also became the first US season to feature a contestant from another franchise. The cast consisted of four winners of Drag Race: Jaida Essence Hall (season 12), Jinkx Monsoon (season 5), Raja (season 3) and Yvie Oddly (season 11); three winners of All Stars: Monét X Change and Trinity the Tuck (co-winning season 4) and Shea Couleé (season 5); and the winner of UK season 1, The Vivienne. Jinkx Monsoon was crowned the Queen of All Queens, becoming the first to win two seasons of RuPaul's Drag Race. Monét X Change was the runner-up, and Raja won a second title, "Queen of 'She Done Already Done Had Herses'."

Season 8 premiered on Paramount+ on May 12, 2023. The cast consisted of Alexis Michelle, Darienne Lake, Heidi N. Closet, Jaymes Mansfield, Jessica Wild, Jimbo, Kahanna Montrese, Kandy Muse, Mrs. Kasha Davis, LaLa Ri, Monica Beverly Hillz and Naysha Lopez. Jimbo won the competition on July 21, 2023, becoming the first queen from a non-American franchise (in this case, Canada's Drag Race) to be inducted into the Hall of Fame. Kandy Muse was the runner-up, and LaLa Ri won the title, "Queen of the 'Fame Games'."

On August 21, 2023, World of Wonder announced that the series had been renewed for a ninth season, set to begin airing on Paramount+ on May 17, 2024. On April 23, 2024, the cast was announced. Its eight contestants were Angeria Paris VanMicheals, Gottmik, Jorgeous, Nina West, Plastique Tiara, Roxxxy Andrews, Shannel and Vanessa Vanjie. For the first time in the franchise's history, the contestants competed for a $200,000 donation to a charity of their choosing. On July 26, 2024, the winner of the season, joining the Drag Race Hall of Fame, was revealed to be Angeria Paris VanMicheals. Angeria chose the National Black Justice Coalition as the recipient of her $200,000 grand prize. Roxxxy Andrews and Vanessa Vanjie were the runner-ups, each earning $25,000 donations for their chosen charity. This season accumulated over $300,000 for charity.

Season 10, called the "Tournament of All-stars", featured eighteen queens from previous seasons. It included a first segment of competition in 3 brackets, in which the top 3 from each bracket moved on to the quarter-finals, and the points on this round were given from the judges and the other queens in the bracket. The quarter and semi-final rounds were judged solely by the judges. In the finale, the top 9 (top 8 semi-finalists and an all-star previously eliminated judges' favourite queen from this season who also won a raffle), competed in a series of "lip-sync lalaparuza for the crown" matches until the winner was announced. Ginger Minj from season 7 and from 3 previous all-star seasons was crowned the winner of the season, with Jorgeous from season 14 and from all-stars season 9 being the runner-up. Lydia B Kollins from season 17 and Bosco from season 14, shared together the 3rd and 4th places.

== Untucked! ==
Just like RuPaul's Drag Race, episodes of the first season of All Stars were followed by an Untucked! episode each week, giving the viewers a glimpse into the backstage drama and discussions between the returning contestants. For the second, third, and fourth seasons, the contestants deliberated among themselves in the workroom on who each of the top 2 would eliminate if they won the Lip Sync for Your Legacy. This served as a mini-Untucked! as there were no separately filmed Untucked companion episodes for those seasons. On June 5, 2020, it was announced that the aftershow series would return for the fifth season, coinciding with the retiring of the Legacy elimination format.

Season	Episodes	Originally released			RuPaul's Drag Race season
Season	Episodes	First released	Last released	Network	RuPaul's Drag Race season
1	6	October 22, 2012	November 26, 2012	Logo	All Stars 1
2	8	June 5, 2020	July 24, 2020	VH1	All Stars 5
3	12	June 24, 2021	September 2, 2021	Paramount+	All Stars 6
4	12	May 20, 2022	July 29, 2022	Paramount+	All Stars 7
5	12	May 12, 2023	July 21, 2023	Paramount+	All Stars 8
6	12	May 17, 2024	July 26, 2024	Paramount+	All Stars 9
7	12	May 9, 2025	July 18, 2025	Paramount+	All Stars 10
8	12	May 8, 2026	July 17, 2026	Paramount+	All Stars 11

== International adaptations ==
- RuPaul's Drag Race: UK vs. the World (2022–present): On December 21, 2021, World of Wonder announced that a British All Stars adaptation series of RuPaul's Drag Race UK would premiere in February 2022. Filmed in the United Kingdom, the series features international queens who have competed in the Drag Race franchise around the world.
- Canada's Drag Race: Canada vs. the World (2022–present): An "international all-stars" season of the Drag Race franchise premiered via Crave and WOW Presents Plus in November 2022. The series is a spin-off of Canada's Drag Race and the second edition of the Drag Race franchise to feature queens from numerous international versions of the competition.
- Drag Race España All Stars (2024): A spin-off of Drag Race España, it is the first international localization of the All Stars format featuring returning queens from a single country's edition of the show. It was announced in September 2022 and its first season premiered in February 2024.
- Drag Race France All Stars: A spin-off of Drag Race France, it is the second international localization of the All Stars format. Announced in November 2024, the series premiered on 10 July 2025.

== Home media ==
Season	Release date	Special features	Discs	Ref.
1	January 22, 2013	Bonus scenes; Episodes of Untucked; Meet the Queens interviews	2	

Starting in September 2019, the first two seasons became available to stream on Hulu. Seasons 1 through 3 became available to stream on CBS All Access on July 30, 2020, later on every new season became available on Paramount+. It also became available on WOW Presents Plus, except the United States.

== Reception ==
=== Accolades ===
Award	Year	Category	Recipient(s) and nominee(s)	Result	Ref.
Dorian Awards	2017	LGBTQ TV Show of the Year	RuPaul’s Drag Race All Stars	Nominated	
Dorian Awards	2017	Campy TV Show of the Year	RuPaul’s Drag Race All Stars	Won	
Hollywood Critics Association TV Awards	2022	Best Streaming Reality Show or Competition Series	RuPaul's Drag Race All Stars	Nominated	
Primetime Emmy Awards	2019	Outstanding Picture Editing for a Structured or Competition Reality Program	RuPaul's Drag Race All Stars (for "Jersey Justice")	Nominated	
Primetime Emmy Awards	2022	Outstanding Picture Editing for a Structured or Competition Reality Program	RuPaul's Drag Race All Stars (for "Halftime Headliners")	Nominated	
MTV Movie & TV Awards	2023	Best Competition Series	RuPaul’s Drag Race All Stars	Won	

=== Critical response ===
Critical response of RuPaul's Drag Race All Stars
Season	Rotten Tomatoes
1	80% (5 reviews)
2	100% (8 reviews)
3	14% (7 reviews)
4	86% (7 reviews)

== Discography ==
=== Extended plays ===
Title	Details
Halftime Headliners	Artist: Cast of RuPaul's Drag Race All Stars, Season 6; Release date: July 9, 2021; Label: World of Wonder Productions, Inc.; Formats: Streaming, digital download
Joan!: The Rusical	Artist: The Cast of RuPaul's Drag Race All Stars, Season 8; Release date: June 10, 2023; Label: World of Wonder Productions, Inc.; Formats: Streaming, digital download
Rosemarie's Baby Shower: The Rusical	Artist: The Cast of RuPaul's Drag Race All Stars, Season 9; Release date: July 6, 2024; Label: World of Wonder Productions, Inc.; Formats: Streaming, digital download
Tournament of All Stars: The Rusical	Artist: The Cast of RuPaul's Drag Race All Stars, Season 10; Release date: June 7, 2025; Label: World of Wonder Productions, Inc.; Formats: Streaming, digital download

=== Singles ===
List of singles, with select chart positions
Title	Series	Peak chart positions
Title	Series	US Dance
"The Baddest Bitches in Herstory"	2	—
"Read U Wrote U" (Ellis Miah mix)	2	29
"Divas Live"	3	—
"Sitting on a Secret"	3	—
"Drag Up Your Life"	3	—
"Kitty Girl" (Cast Version)	3	18
"Errybody Say Love"	4	—
"Don't Funk It Up"	4	—
"My Best Judy" (featuring April Malina and Brooke Wilkes)	4	—
"Super Queen" (Cast Version)	4	—
"I'm in Love"	5	—
"Clap Back"	5	—
"Halftime Headliners"	6	—
"Show Up Queen"	6	—
"This Is Our Country" (Cast Version) (with Tanya Tucker)	6	—
"Legends" (Cast Version)	7	—
"Titanic" (MSTR)	7	—
"2getha 4eva" (The Other Girls)	7	—
"Money, Success, Fame, Glamour" (Glam Rock and Disco versions)	8	—
"I Remember Being Born" (Jimbo)	8	—
"Pay Me in Money" (Kandy Muse)	8	—
"Drag Queens Save the World"	9	—
"Pussy on Fire"	9	—
"Winner Winner, Chicken Dinner"	10	—
"Shoot Your Shot"	10	—
"Rappin' Roast"	10	—
"Trailer Hitch" (The Whiskey Chicks)	10	—
"Key Your Car" (The Mud Flaps)	10	—
"Break Dancin' 2: Electric Rugaloo"	11	—
"H.B.F." (Silky Nutmeg Ganache and Vivacious)	11	—
"Dreamin' of Me" (April Carrión and Salina EsTitties)	11	—
"Hoes Before Bros" (Aura Mayari and Crystal Methyd)	11	—
"Rappin' Roast 2: Roast These Hoes"	11	—
"—" denotes a recording that failed to chart, was ineligible for the chart or was not released.
