= Drag on a Dime =

- RuPaul's Drag Race episode
- Episode no.: Season 1 Episode 1
- Presented by: RuPaul
- Original air date: February 2, 2009

Guest appearances
- Mike Ruiz; Bob Mackie

Episode chronology
← Previous —	Next → "Girl Groups"
- RuPaul's Drag Race season 1

"Drag on a Dime" is the premiere episode of the first season of the American reality competition television series RuPaul's Drag Race, which aired on February 2, 2009 on the LGBTQ+ cable channel Logo TV. This also makes the episode the first in the Drag Race franchise.

The episode sees nine competitors participate in a car wash photo shoot, then create "Drag on a Dime" runway looks using items found at the dollar store. Regular panelists RuPaul, Merle Ginsberg, and Santino Rice are joined by guest judges Mike Ruiz and Bob Mackie. Nina Flowers wins the main challenge. Victoria "Porkchop" Parker is eliminated from the competition after placing in the bottom and losing a lip-sync contest against Akashia to "Supermodel (You Better Work)" by RuPaul. "Drag on a Dime" and its challenges have been referenced in future episodes of the show and in other editions of the Drag Race franchise.

== Episode ==
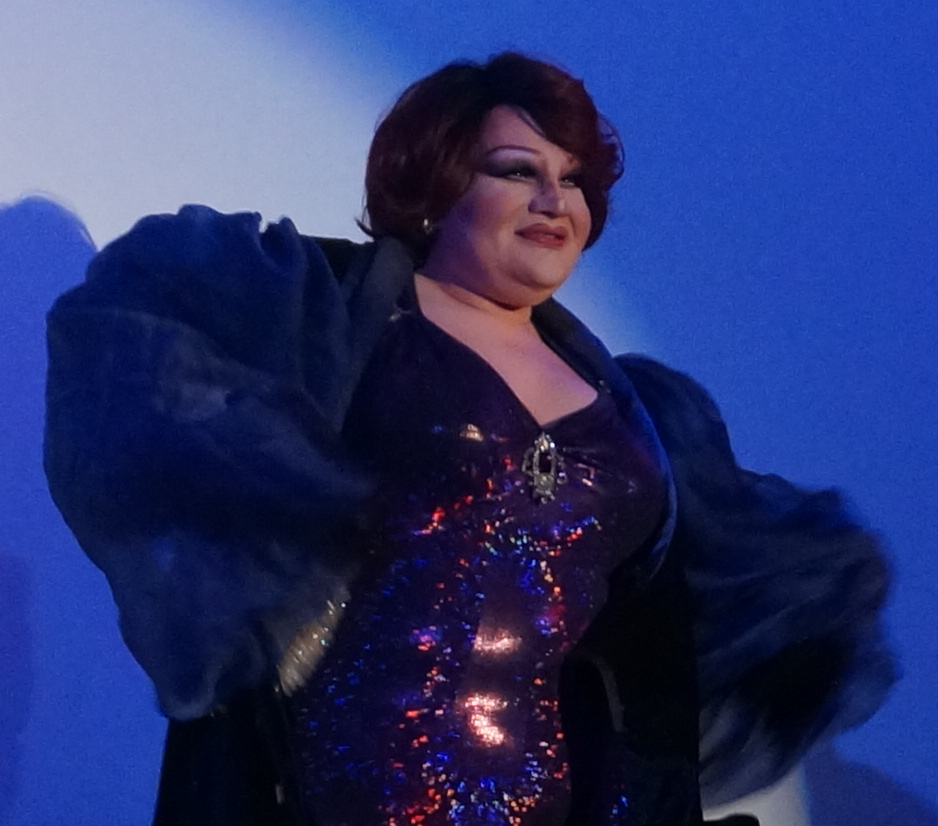
Victoria "Porkchop" Parker (pictured in 2017) is the first contestant eliminated on RuPaul's Drag Race.

The episode begins with the nine contestants entering the workroom: Shannel from Las Vegas; Nina Flowers from Denver; Rebecca Glasscock from Fort Lauderdale, Florida; Ongina from Los Angeles; Victoria "Porkchop" Parker from Raleigh, North Carolina; Akashia from Cleveland; Tammie Brown from Los Angeles; Jade from Chicago; and BeBe Zahara Benet from Minneapolis. RuPaul greets the group and reveals the mini challenge, which tasks the contestants with posing in a "sexy" car wash photo shoot with members of the Pit Crew. Mike Ruiz is the guest photographer. Back in the workroom, RuPaul reveals the main challenge, which tasks the contestants with creating runway looks using items found at the dollar store. The contestants gather materials and start to create their outfits. Victoria "Porkchop" Parker talks about being discriminated against. RuPaul returns and meets with contestants individually to ask questions and offer advice.

On elimination day, the contestants make final preparations for the fashion show. On the main stage, RuPaul welcomes fellow judges Merle Ginsberg and Santino Rice, as well as guest judges Ruiz and Bob Mackie. The fashion show commences. After the contestants present their looks, the judges deliver their critiques, deliberate, then share the results with the group. Nina Flowers and Ongina are praised for their photographs and runway looks, while Akashia, Rebecca Glasscock, and Victoria "Porkchop" Parker receive negative critiques. Nina Flowers wins the challenge, earning a stay at the Paris Las Vegas. Ongina and Rebecca Glasscock are safe, leaving Akashia and Victoria "Porkchop" Parker up for elimination. The two face off in a lip-sync contest to the 1992 song "Supermodel (You Better Work)" by RuPaul. Akashia wins the lip-sync and Victoria "Porkchop" Parker is the first contestant to be eliminated from the competition.

== Production and broadcast ==
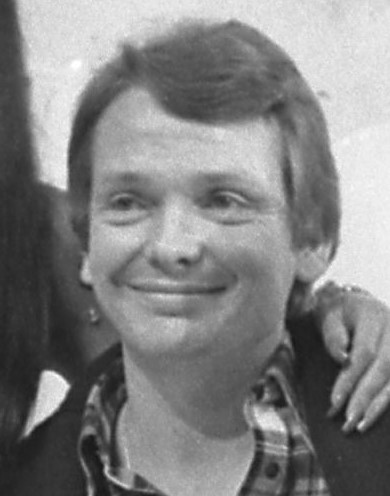
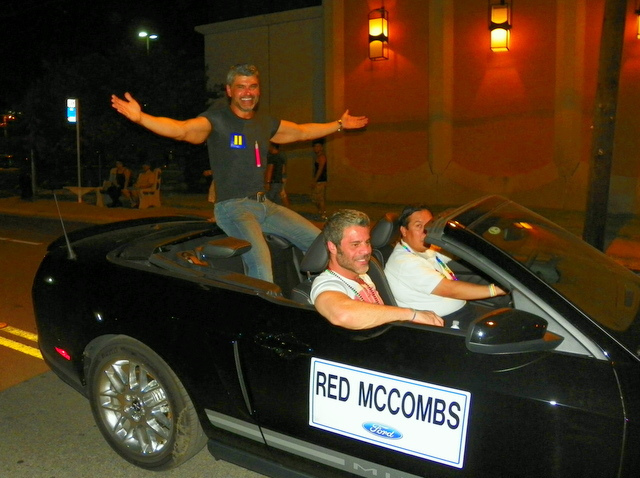
Fashion designer Bob Mackie (top, pictured in 1975) and photographer Mike Ruiz (bottom, pictured as the grand marshal of San Antonio's pride parade in 2011) are guest judges.

The episode originally aired on February 2, 2009.

=== Fashion ===
For the photo shoot, Tammie Brown wears a green dress, yellow high-heeled shoes, and a brown wig. Shannel wears a black-and-white outfit with large earrings. Victoria "Porkchop" Parker wears a black-and-red outfit and a short red wig. Nina Flowers has a colorful outfit with a red corset and a blonde wig. Akashia has a neon green outfit and silver high-heels. Ongina has a black-and-white outfit and a fascinator. Bebe Zahara Benet wears a black skirt and a short wig. Jade's outfit is silver. Rebecca's outfit is a yellow top and a denim bottom. For the fashion show, Nina Flowers has a red outfit with flowers on her shoulder, as well as black boots and a wig styled as a mohawk. Akashia has a short black shirt, large earrings, and a short wig. Ongina wears an outfit with white ruffles and a headpiece. Victoria "Porkchop" Parker has a green outfit and a red wig. Bebe Zahara Benet wears a black outfit and a large wig. Shannel wears a swimsuit and carries an umbrella. Jade also carries a prop. Rebecca Glasscock has a black-and-silver outfit and a short wig. Tammie Brown's outfit is black, light blue, and white.

== Reception and legacy ==
The "drag on a dime" challenge became a staple within the franchise. It was used as one of the design challenges on the eighth season episode "Keeping It 100!" (2016), with Naysha Lopez receiving the theme, and was the main challenge on the tenth season premiere episode "10s Across the Board" (2018). The third episode "Posh on a Penny" of the first series (2019) of RuPaul's Drag Race UK references the challenge, using the same premise. In 2021, Screen Rant included Nina Flowers's "Drag on a Dime" look as one of the ten best design challenge looks in the series. The episode's mini challenge was recreated by the first group of contestants on the fifteenth season premiere episode "One Night Only, Part 1" (2023).

Kevin O'Keeffe ranked the "Supermodel" performance number 104 in INTO Magazine's 2018 "definitive ranking" of the show's lip-syncs to date. Sam Brooks ranked the contest number 159 in The Spinoff's 2019 "definitive ranking" of the show's 162 lip-sync contests to date. Brooks opined, "Look, this is no shade on these queens. This is shade on the editors – editing a lip-sync is goddamned hard. You need to build a narrative without being able to use the entire song (all these performances are generally 75-90 seconds long), you need to showcase each queen and exactly why they won and why they lost, and provide a climax to your episode." Brooks continued, "I'm not surprised that the editors hadn't quite nailed it for the first episode, and the queens maybe hadn’t quite figured out how to make the most of a stage that's about the size of the device I'm typing this post on. It's messy all around, and it shows you how far the show has come in terms of literally everything." Victoria "Porkchop" Parker's name has been used to refer to any contestants in the Drag Race franchise being called "Porkchops", the "Porkchop" of their season or country, or as getting "Porkchopped". This can notably be seen with the contestants who lost the premiere lip sync in the season 13 (2021) episode "The Pork Chop" being sent to the Porkchop Loading Dock.
