= Drag House Rules =

Television series

- Genre: Satire
- Written by: John Mark Hostetler; Cory Nixon
- Directed by: John Mark Hostetler
- Starring: Laganja Estranja; Jujubee; Manila Luzon; Rock M. Sakura; Silky Nutmeg Ganache; Tammie Brown
- Country of origin: Canada
- Original language: English
- No. of seasons: 2
- No. of episodes: 14

Production
- Running time: 19–22 minutes
- Production company: Producer Entertainment Group

Original release
- Network: OUTtv
- Release: February 21, 2025 – present

Drag House Rules is a television series which debuted on the Canadian channel OUTtv on February 21, 2025. A scripted satire of reality competition television series, it features RuPaul's Drag Race contestants Laganja Estranja, Jujubee, Manila Luzon, Rock M. Sakura, Silky Nutmeg Ganache, and Tammie Brown, as well as The Boulet Brothers' Dragula contestant Biqtch Puddin'.

Drag House Rules Season 2 is set to return to OUTtv, featuring a star-studded cast including Jujubee, BeBe Zahara Benet, Plane Jane, Scarlet Envy, Heidi N Closet, Angeria Paris VanMicheals, Trinity the Tuck, Sapphira Cristál, Salina EsTitties, Sherry Vine, and Tammie Brown.

== Season 1 ==
=== Contestants ===
Contestant	Previously known for
Biqtch Puddin'	The Boulet Brothers' Dragula season 2
Jujubee	RuPaul's Drag Race season 2 RuPaul's Drag Race All Stars season 1 RuPaul's Drag Race All Stars season 5 Queen of the Universe season 1 RuPaul's Drag Race: UK vs. the World series 1
Laganja Estranja	RuPaul's Drag Race season 6
Manila Luzon	RuPaul's Drag Race season 3 RuPaul's Drag Race All Stars season 1 RuPaul's Drag Race All Stars season 4 Drag Den
Rock M. Sakura	RuPaul's Drag Race season 12
Silky Nutmeg Ganache	RuPaul's Drag Race season 11; RuPaul's Drag Race All Stars season 6 Canada's Drag Race: Canada vs. the World season 1
Tammie Brown	RuPaul's Drag Race season 1 RuPaul's Drag Race All Stars season 1

=== Episodes ===
No. overall	No. in season	Title	Original release date
1	1	"Drag House Rules"	February 21, 2025
2	2	"The Bachelor & The Bad Egg"	February 28, 2025
3	3	"The Soulmate & The Sandwich"	March 7, 2025
4	4	"The Ghost & The Ganja"	March 14, 2025
5	5	"The Knife Throw & The Old Crow"	March 21, 2025
6	6	"The Foot Race & The Basket Case"	March 28, 2025

== Season 2 ==
=== Host & Producer ===
Contestant	Previously known for
BeBe Zahara Benet	RuPaul's Drag Race season 1 RuPaul's Drag Race All Stars season 3
Jujubee	RuPaul's Drag Race season 2 RuPaul's Drag Race All Stars season 1 RuPaul's Drag Race All Stars season 5 Queen of the Universe season 1 RuPaul's Drag Race: UK vs. the World series 1 Drag House Rules season 1

=== Contestants ===
Contestant	Previously known for
Angeria Paris VanMicheals	RuPaul's Drag Race season 14; RuPaul's Drag Race All Stars season 9
Heidi N Closet	RuPaul's Drag Race season 12; RuPaul's Drag Race All Stars season 8
Plane Jane	RuPaul's Drag Race season 16; House of Villains season 3
Salina EsTitties	RuPaul's Drag Race season 15; RuPaul's Drag Race All Stars season 11
Sapphira Cristál	RuPaul's Drag Race season 16
Scarlet Envy	RuPaul's Drag Race season 11; RuPaul's Drag Race All Stars season 6 RuPaul's Drag Race: UK vs. the World series 2
Sherry Vine	The Sherry Vine Variety Show
Trinity the Tuck	RuPaul's Drag Race season 9 RuPaul's Drag Race All Stars season 4 RuPaul's Drag Race All Stars season 7

=== Guest ===
Contestant	Previously known for
Tammie Brown	RuPaul's Drag Race season 1 RuPaul's Drag Race All Stars season 1 Drag House Rules season 1

=== Episodes ===
No. overall	No. in season	Title	Original release date
7	1	"The Queen & The Machine"	May 21, 2026
8	2	"The Left Hook & The Lemonade"	May 28, 2026
9	3	"The Pain & The Plane"	June 4, 2026
10	4	"The Spill & The Thrill"	June 11, 2026
11	5	"The Melody & The Meltdown"	June 18, 2026
12	6	"The Revelation & The Rice"	June 25, 2026
13	7	"The Juju & The Judgement"	July 2, 2026
14	8	"The Behind & The Scenes"	July 9, 2026
