= Jade Sotomayor =

Drag performer

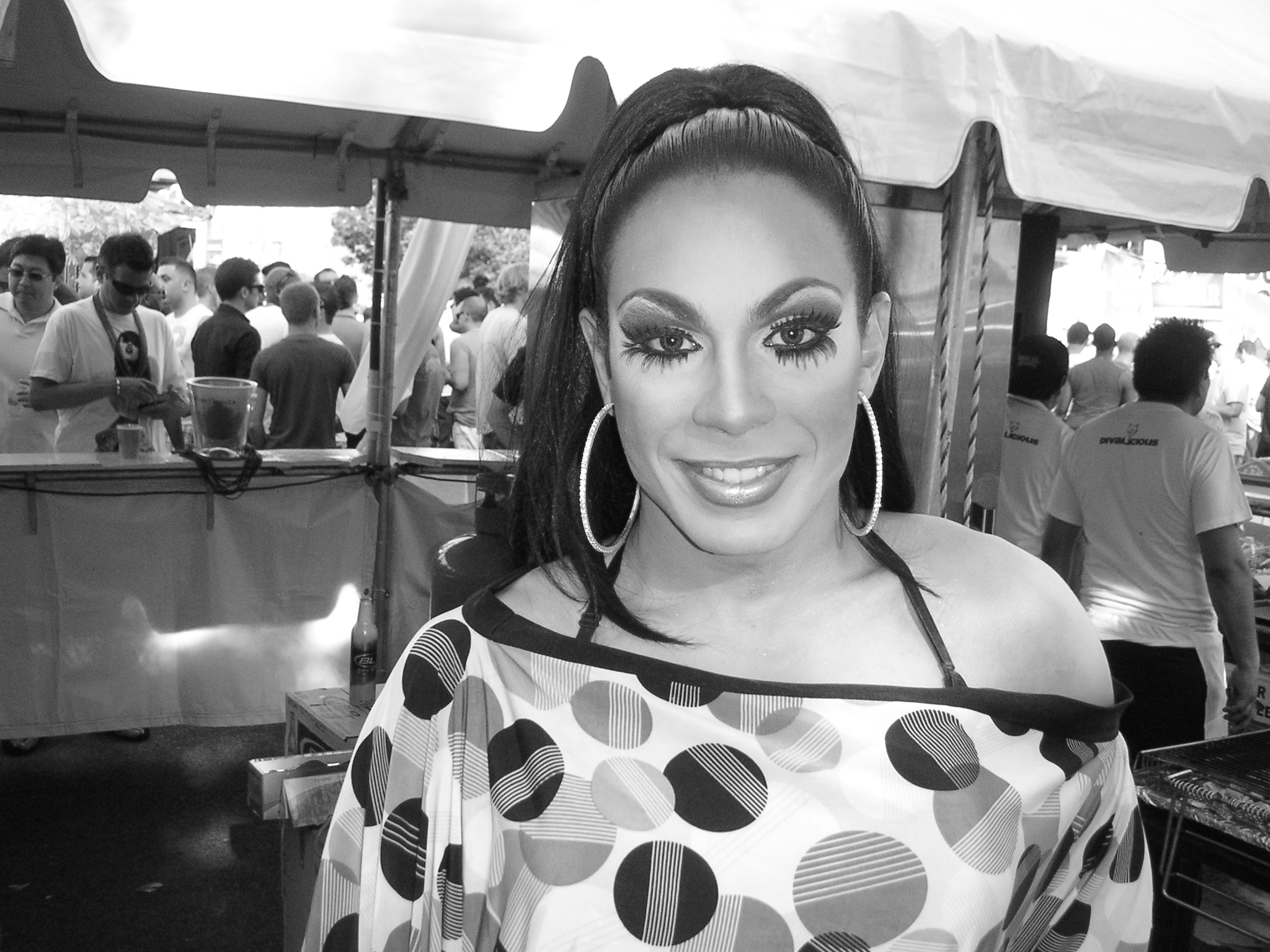
- Born: David Sotomayor Jr. November 18, 1984 (age 41)
- Occupation: Drag performer
- Television: RuPaul's Drag Race (season 1)

David Sotomayor Jr., known by his stage name Jade (born November 18, 1984), is an American drag queen and television personality best known for competing on the first season of RuPaul's Drag Race.

== Early life ==
Sotomayor was raised in Chicago's Humboldt Park neighborhood.

== Career ==
When Sotomayor first started drag, his persona's name was Jennifer. A friend gave him that name due to his love for Jennifer Lopez. Sotomayor thought it was common, so he went with the name Jay. After a host mispronounced it as Jade, Sotomayor kept the name and decided to include his last name.

In 2009, Jade competed on the first season of RuPaul's Drag Race at the age of 25. She was eliminated on the fourth episode, after placing in the bottom two of the main challenge and losing a lip-sync contest against Rebecca Glasscock to "Would I Lie to You?" (1985) by Eurythmics. Jade placed sixth overall. She and fellow contestant Tammie Brown would sneak out of the hotel room at times. Jade was a presenter at Logo TV's Trailblazer Honors in 2016. She appeared on the finale of Drag Race's tenth season. In 2017, she performed in Queens United / Reinas Unidas, a show organized by Phi Phi O'Hara to help victims in Puerto Rico. Jade has co-hosted shows at Hamburger Mary's in Andersonville, alongside Drag Race alumni DiDa Ritz and Monica Beverly Hillz.

In 2020, Jade appeared in an episode of Empire and a year later, became a nurse during the COVID-19 pandemic.

Later, Sotomayor appeared in the indie film Bailiwick.

== Personal life ==
Sotomayor is Latino and of Puerto Rican descent. His cousin, Edward Sotomayor, was killed in the Pulse nightclub shooting in Orlando, Florida. Sotomayor was included in Windy City Times's "30 Under 30" list in 2009. He lived in Jefferson Park, as of 2016. "Trade Sotomayor" is a nickname. He had approximately 53,000 followers on Instagram in 2022.

== Filmography ==
- Deadly Affairs (2013)
- College Debts (2015)
- Lipstick City (2016)
- Bailiwick (2017)
- This Wasn't Supposed to Happen (2019)

=== Television ===
Year	Title	Role	Notes
2009	RuPaul's Drag Race	Herself	Contestant (6th place)

== See also ==
- LGBTQ culture in Chicago
- List of people from Chicago
