= Chad Michaels =

American drag performer and Cher impersonator

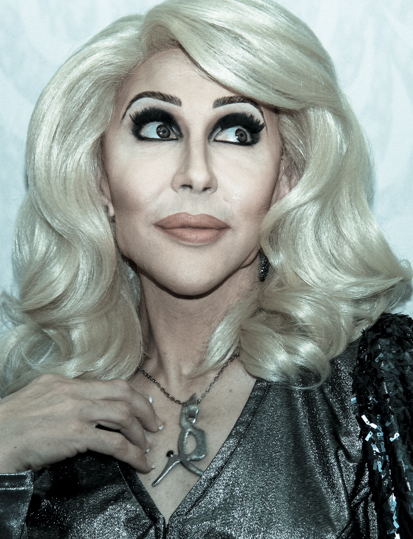
- Michaels at RuPaul's DragCon LA in 2018
- Born: Chad Michael Storbeck; March 20, 1971 (age 55); Arcadia, California, U.S.
- Occupations: Drag performer, Cher impersonator
- Years active: 1995 – present
- Known for: RuPaul's Drag Race All Stars winner; runner-up on season 4 of RuPaul's Drag Race
- Spouse: Adam Magee (m. 2015)

Chad Michael Storbeck, known professionally as Chad Michaels (born March 20, 1971), is an American drag performer and professional Cher impersonator. He was a runner-up in the fourth season of RuPaul's Drag Race and the winner of the first season of RuPaul's Drag Race All Stars. In 2013, he released "Tragic Girl", his debut single and music video.

== Early life ==
Michaels was born Chad Michael Storbeck to former high school football player Jerry Michael Storbeck of Aurelia, Iowa, and salon worker Linda Storbeck Olson of Encinitas, California, at Arcadia Methodist Hospital in Arcadia, California, on March 20, 1971. His parents graduated from Pasadena High School and Aurelia High School, respectively, and wed in 1968. They resided in Olivenhain, Encinitas, California, at the time of his birth before they moved to Los Angeles, and then again to San Diego, where he was raised. He originally went by the drag name "Brigitte Love." Michaels chose to perform under his own name after working at "An Evening at La Cage" in Las Vegas, which required the drag queens to use masculine stage names. Michaels is married to Adam Magee.

== Career ==
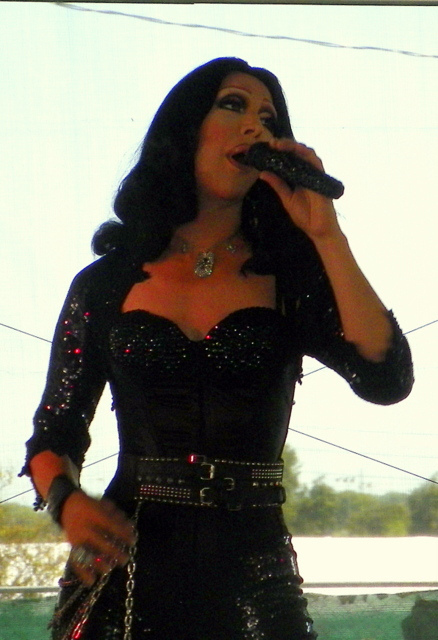
Michaels is well known for impersonating Cher.

Michaels began his career as a celebrity impersonator, being especially known for his Cher impressions.

After his run on Drag Race, Chad continued to perform as Cher.

Michaels produces and performs with the Dreamgirls Revue, a drag show in California. Performers in the Dreamgirls Revue have included RuPaul's Drag Race contestants Delta Work, Raven, Detox, Morgan McMichaels, Raja, Shannel, and Venus D-Lite.

Morgan McMichaels is Michaels' drag daughter.

Michaels started touring with Farrah Moan in 2019 for the Burlesque tour, based on the 2010 film of the same name starring Cher and Christina Aguilera.

In 2010, Michaels competed in the first California Entertainer of the Year pageant, becoming first alternate to winner Shangela.

== RuPaul's Drag Race ==
=== Season 4 ===
In 2011, Michaels was announced as one of the 13 queens competing on the fourth season of RuPaul's Drag Race in 2012.

The season began with a design challenge, which Michaels performed adequately in, but the episode 2, Chad won his first challenge alongside Madame LaQueer, the "WTF!: Wrestling's Trashiest Fighters", where the contestants had to play wrestlers. Chad continued performing well, getting good critiques for the advertisement challenge in episode 3 and the acting challenge in episode 4.

Chad won his second challenge in Episode 5, the Snatch Game, where he impersonated Cher. His performance has been regarded as one of the best performances in the challenge's history. Chad performed solidly in the remaining challenges, not winning any but doing well enough to be safe. This ended in episode 11, where Chad performed poorly in a ball challenge and was put into the bottom two against Latrice Royale. The two lip-synced to "No One Else on Earth" by Wynona Judd. Latrice was eliminated, and Chad won and gained a spot in the finale.

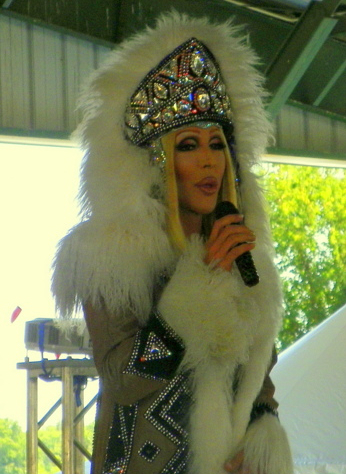
Michaels impersonating Cher in Austin, Texas.

At the grand finale, it was revealed that Chad had lost the season to Sharon Needles, tying for second with Phi Phi O'Hara.

=== All Stars 1 ===
Shortly after his run on season 4, Chad was announced as a contestant on the first season of RuPaul's Drag Race All Stars.

During the season, a twist was incorporated where the twelve contestants had to pair up with a fellow contestant to run the season with. Chad picked season 1 contestant, Shannel and the pair were given the name "Team Shad". The first challenge was a photo shoot where contestants had to take "half-baked" and "opposites attract" photos. Shad performed weakly, landing in the bottom two in episode 1 beside Team Mandora (Mimi Imfurst and Pandora Boxx). Chad lip-synced against Mimi to Opposites Attract by Paula Abdul and won, sending Mimi and Pandora home first.

In episode 2, team Shad survived the "gaff-in" challenge, followed by the team winning all three of the final challenges in episodes 3, 4, and 5, a pranks challenge, girl group/makeover challenge, and a ball challenge, which took both Chad and Shannel to the final 4.

In the finale, Shannel and Jujubee were eliminated, leaving Chad and season 2 finalist, Raven as the final two. After they lip-synced to Responsitrannity by RuPaul, it was announced that Chad had won All Stars 1. This secured his spot in the Drag Race Hall of Fame.

== Discography ==
=== Singles ===
Year	Song	Ref
2013	"Tragic Girl"	

== Filmography ==
=== Film ===
Year	Title	Role	Notes	Ref.
2011	Bamboo Shark	Cher		
2021	The Bitch Who Stole Christmas	Cher		
TBA	Maybe This Time	Stephen	Pre-production	

=== Television ===
Year	Title	Role	Notes	Ref.
2002	MADtv	Cher impersonator at gay bar	Season 7, Episode 15	
2003	E! True Hollywood Story: Cher	Himself		
2007	Women's Murder Club	Glenn Whitney	Episode 9: "To Drag and to Hold"	
2009	Kath & Kim	Cher	Episode 16: "Bachelorette"	
2011	Top Gear	Cher impersonator	Series 17, Episode 3	
2012	RuPaul's Drag Race (season 4)	Contestant	Runner-up	
2012	RuPaul's Drag Race: Untucked (season 3)	Herself	11 episodes	
2012	NewNowNext Awards	Herself		
2012	RuPaul's Drag U	Herself		
2012	RuPaul's Drag Race All Stars (season 1)	Contestant	Winner	
2012	RuPaul's Drag Race All Stars: Untucked (season 1)	Herself	6 episodes	
2015	Jane the Virgin	Cher impersonator		
2015	2 Broke Girls	Cher impersonator		
2016	RuPaul's Drag Race	Herself	Guest Star (Season 8, Episode 1: "Keeping It 100!")	
2018	RuPaul's Drag Race	Herself	Guest Star (Season 10, Episode 1 and 8)	
2018	RuPaul's Drag Race All Stars (seasons 3–4)	Herself	Guest Star (Season 3, Episodes 1–6; Season 4, Episode 1)	
2019	The Ellen DeGeneres Show	Cher	Guest	
2020	AJ and the Queen	Brian Gerrity/Cher	Guest appearance	
2024	RuPaul's Drag Race	Herself	Guest Star (Season 16, Episode 8: "Snatch Game")	

=== Music Videos ===
Year	Title	Artist	Ref.
2012	"Glamazon"	RuPaul	
2012	"Responsitrannity	RuPaul	
2013	"Woman's World" (Remix)	Cher	
2013	"Tragic Girl"	Chad Michaels & Liquid360	

=== Web series ===
Year	Title	Role	Notes	Ref.
2013	WOW Shopping Network	Herself	Guest	
2013	Ring My Bell	Herself	Guest	
2013	RuPaul Drives	Herself	Guest	
2013	Transformations	Herself	Guest	
2013	It Gets Better	Herself	Guest	
2014-2016	Cher Tweets	Herself	Host	
2014	Raja Drawja	Herself	Guest	
2014	Bestie$ For Ca$h	Herself	Guest, with Morgan McMichaels	
2016	Eat It!	Herself	Guest	
2018	The Pit Stop	Herself	Episode: "A Jury of Their Queers"	
2020	The Vivienne Takes Hollywood	Herself	Guest	

Preceded by First	Winner of RuPaul's Drag Race All Stars; US All Stars 1	Succeeded by Alaska Thunderfuck
