= Tammie Brown =

American drag performer, reality television personality, and recording artist

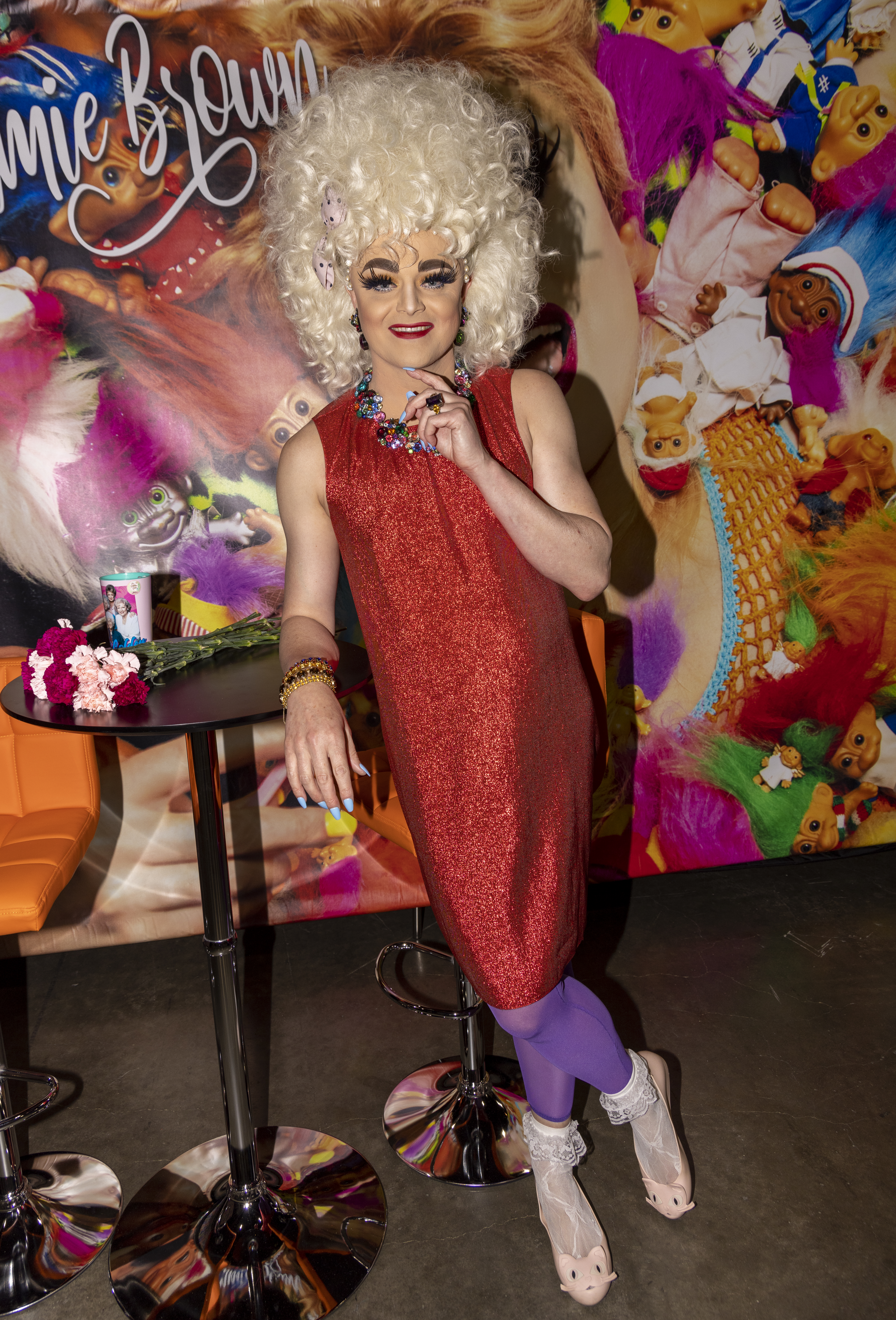
- Brown at RuPaul's DragCon LA in 2023
- Born: Keith Glen Schubert; September 15, 1980 (age 46); Corpus Christi, Texas, U.S.
- Education: Brooks College
- Occupation: Drag performer
- Years active: 1999–present
- Television: RuPaul's Drag Race (season 1)

Tammie Brown is the stage name of Keith Glen Schubert (born September 15, 1980), an American drag performer, reality television personality, and recording artist. Brown was a fixture in the Southern California drag scene before appearing on the first seasons of RuPaul's Drag Race and RuPaul's Drag Race: All Stars.

== Early life ==
Keith Glen Schubert was born to Constance Marie "Conie" Rowe and Keith H. Schubert at Corpus Christi Memorial Hospital on September 15, 1980, in Corpus Christi, Texas, but was raised in Fulton, Texas and Puerto Vallarta, Mexico. He was originally planned to be born in Puerto Vallarta, but was born in Corpus Christi instead due to an amoeba epidemic. Schubert has one sister, who is younger by two years. He additionally lived in Mathis, Texas for a short time during junior high. He was raised as a Christian. Growing up, he wanted to be a rockstar or a popstar, and was surrounded by his parents' music tastes, which included artists such as Dire Straits, Talking Heads, Sade, Jimmy Buffett, and Tom Petty. During his time spent living in Mexico, he was further artistically inspired by Gloria Trevi, Tina Turner, and Mexican culture.

Schubert started dressing in drag during high school, where he attended Rockport-Fulton High School, in theatre productions of Grease as Cha Cha and Into the Woods as Cinderella's Stepmother. Due to his religion, he was fearful of embracing his homosexuality for fear of being sent to Hell. However, his fears were quelled when a Native American friend of his informed him of their culture's views on homosexuality, as well as concepts such as two-spiritism. His father was originally unsupportive of his interest in drag, once stating to his mother that they should "just kill him and bury him in a hole in the backyard"; however, Brown has stated that he has become "friends" with his father again since. He studied Middle Eastern dance for two years before moving on to disco. He originally wanted his drag name to simply be "Keith Schubert" or "Glen Schubert", but after recommendations from fellow Texas drag queens to make up her own name, he decided to do so. While preparing to go clubbing, he tuned into a three-way call that contained his friend and a boy he had a crush on, and his caller ID identified him as "Bob Brown", his friend's stepdad's name (also said to simply be his friend's name). When the boy eventually realized "Bob"'s true identity and called Schubert out for it, he got the idea to adopt the surname. He has said that his first name, Tammie, was simply "sort of made up". He also considered the name "Tootsie Turner" as a drag name, because he was a big fan of Tina Turner and the movie, Tootsie. Schubert said that his first job was performing songs by Turner and Donna Summer on a picnic table in Rockport.

== Career ==
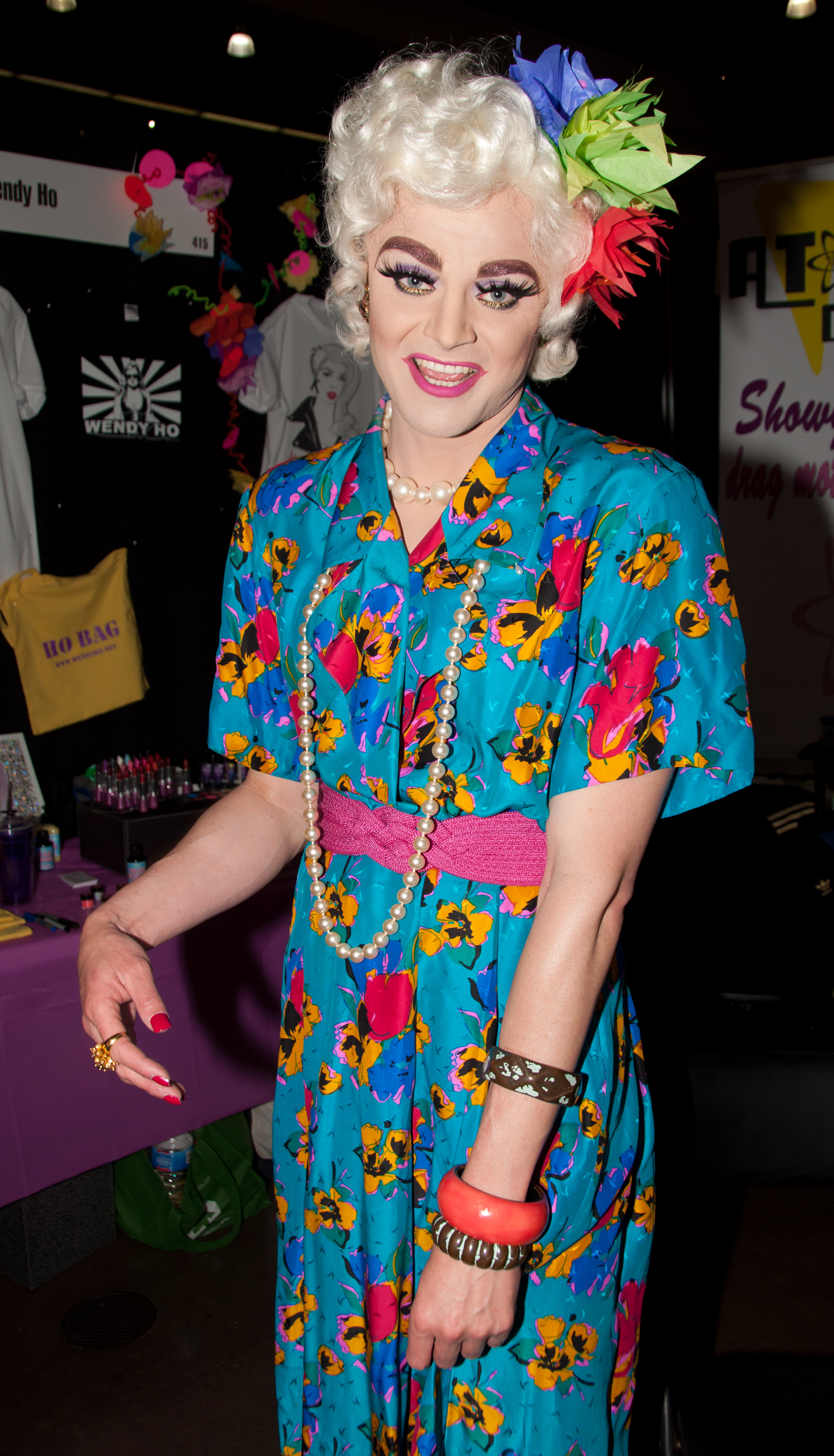
Tammie posing at Drag Con Los Angeles June 2015

Schubert's drag persona was created in 1999. Tammie Brown's first measure of fame was gained when she became a member of the Long Beach location of Hamburger Mary's popular drag brunch show, "The Brunchettes", in 2003.

Tammie Brown first appeared on The Surreal Life with Tammy Faye Messner. Out of drag, Schubert has appeared on How Clean Is Your House? and acted in commercials for McDonald's and UPS. Tammie Brown also performed in the Los Angeles Auditions of season 2 of America's Got Talent.

Tammie Brown was announced as one of nine contestants for the first season of RuPaul's Drag Race on February 2, 2009. She was eliminated in the second episode, placing eighth. Tammie Brown was amongst 12 past contestants who were brought back for RuPaul's Drag Race: All Stars in 2012. She was paired with first-season castmate Nina Flowers to form Team Brown Flowers and was eliminated in the second episode "RuPaul's Gaff-In". "Responsitrannity", the runway theme song for All Stars, was inspired by RuPaul's first season fight with Tammie Brown. Tammie Brown, along with All Stars contestants Manila Luzon, Raven, and Latrice Royale, appeared in a television commercial for travel website Orbitz's portal for LGBT leisure travel. Outside of Drag Race, Tammie Brown released her debut album Popcorn on March 18, 2009. In 2011, she and fellow RuPaul's Drag Race contestant Ongina were honorary trail guides for the Saddle Up LA AIDS Benefit Trail Ride. In 2012, TammieBrown was featured in an Allstate ad. TammieBrown was also photographed for Gorgeous, a project that involved Armen Ra, Candis Cayne, and Miss Fame. TammieBrown is a member of the band the Rollz Royces with Kelly Mantle and Michael Catti. Mantle and Catti have appeared in Tammie Brown's Christmas show Holiday Sparkle at Fubar in West Hollywood, California.

Tammie Brown was one of thirty drag queens featured in Miley Cyrus's 2015 VMA performance. Tammie Brown was the only season one contestant to not appear at the season ten grand finale, due to being the warm-up act for Trixie Mattel's tour in August 2018. In June 2019, Tammie Brown was one of 37 queens to be featured on the cover of New York Magazine. In July 2023, Tammie Brown announced a month-long residency at Red Room, a nightclub and performance venue in Provincetown, Massachusetts.

== Personal life ==
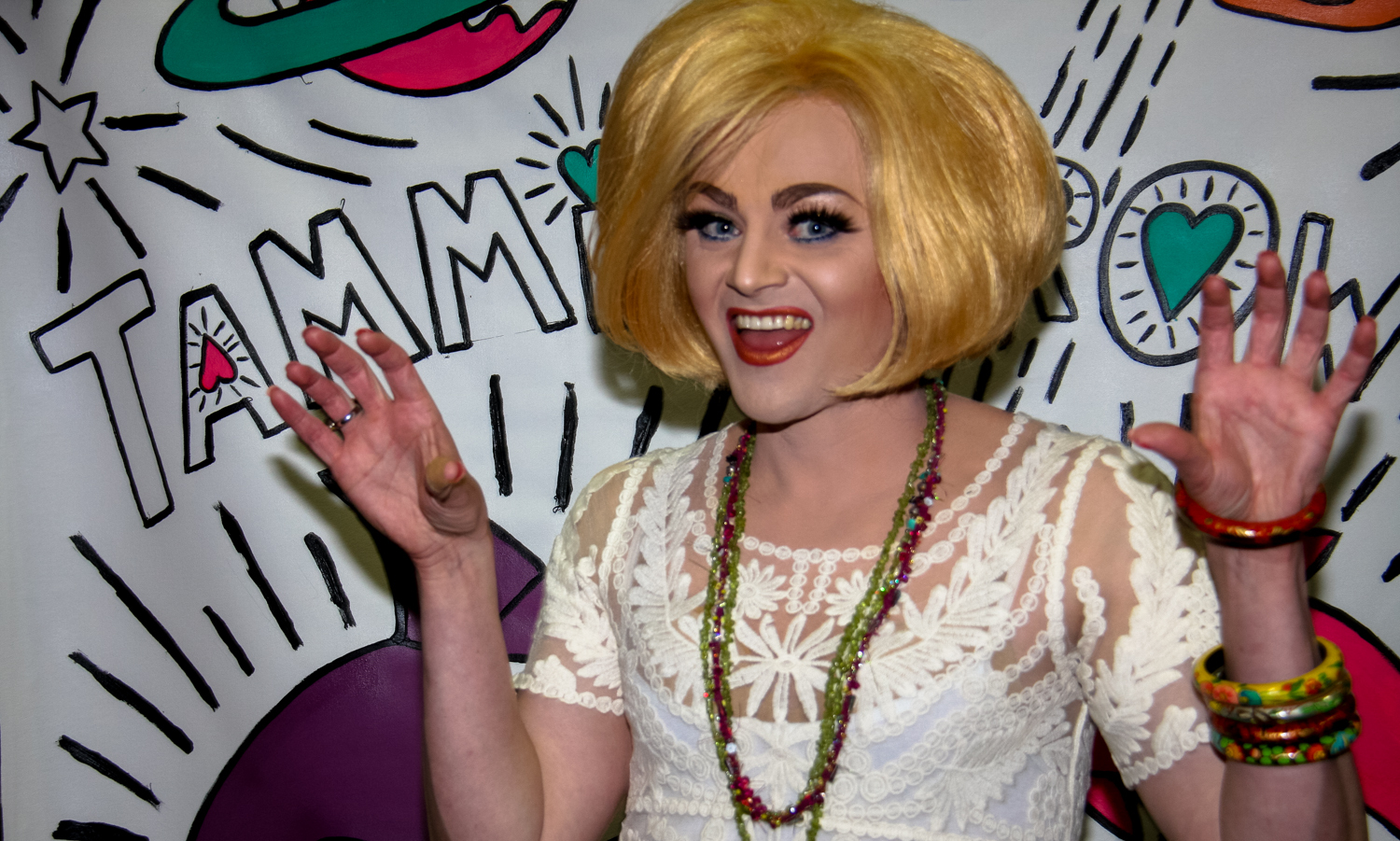
Tammie Brown in 2017

Schubert is gay and has been out since high school. He frequently volunteers at the Long Beach Gay and Lesbian Center. He lived in Long Beach for 13 years before moving back to Fulton. He is a Buddhist, and began practicing in 2000. Schubert is an environmentalist, and opposes fracking, offshore drilling, and generative AI.

Schubert attended Brooks College in Long Beach, graduating with an associate's degree in fashion design.

Schubert speaks Spanish, and is learning Nawat.

Schubert describes himself as a "pop-folk artist" in all aspects of his art. His longest ongoing visual art project are the "Rag Queens", which are "little creatures" that Schubert creates out of his used nylons (as well as wire and papier-mâché) and sells via his social media accounts. Schubert has described his drag style as "bohemian", "Hollywood", and "organic". He cites the movies What's Love Got to Do with It? and Tootsie as major inspirations for his drag.

== Discography ==
=== Studio albums ===
Title	Details
Popcorn	Released: March 18, 2009; Label: Self-released; Formats: Digital download
Hot Skunx / Zorillos Calliente	Released: March 11, 2014; Label: Self-released; Formats: Digital download
Schubert'	Released: October 18, 2019; Label: Self-released; Formats: Digital download

=== Extended plays ===
Title	Details
Little Bit of Tammie	Released: September 27, 2018; Label: Self-released; Formats: Digital download

=== Singles ===
Title	Year	Album
"Discos Undead"	2010	Non-album single
"Love Piñata"	2012	Non-album single
"Whatever It May Be" (featuring Bownce)	2014	Non-album single
"Round 'n' Round"	2019	Schubert'
"Gingerbread House"	2020	Non-album single
"Holiday Sparkle"	2020	Non-album single
"Soothsayer"	2022	Non-album single
"Pumpkin Blaster"	2022	Non-album single
"Summer Angel"	2023	Non-album single
"Time Machine"	2023	Non-album single
"We Like to Party"	2024	Non-album single

=== Music videos ===
Title	Year	Director
"Whatever"	2007	Rod Barroso
"Shakabuku U"	2007	Rod Barroso
"The Ballad of Tiger Lilly"	2009	Rod Barroso
"Discos Undead"	2010	Rod Barroso
"Clam Happy"	2010	Rod Barroso
"Love Piñata"	2012	Rod Barroso
"Amigos Son Héroes/La Telaraña"	2014	Bri Cirel
"I Stay Connected"	2014	Bri Cirel
"Walking Children in Nature"	2014	Bri Cirel
"Round 'N Round"	2019	John Mark
"Schubert"	2020	John Mark

== Filmography ==
Year	Title	Role	Notes
2010	Mouse's Birthday	Himself	
2011	The Summer of Massacre	Clubber #2	
2011	Fest Selects: Best Gay Shorts, Vol. 1	Himself	
2013	I Am Divine	Himself	

=== Television ===
Year	Title	Role	Notes	Ref
2004	How Clean Is Your House?	Himself	"Philthy Philharmonic"	
2007	America's Got Talent	Himself	"L.A. auditions"	
2009	RuPaul's Drag Race	Himself	8th Place (Eliminated in Episode 2)	
2010	RuPaul's Drag U	Himself	Episode 7: "Mother vs Daughters"	
2010	The Arrangement	Himself	Episode 6	
2012	RuPaul's Drag Race: All Stars	Himself	9th/10th Place (Eliminated in Episode 2)	
2015	Skin Wars	Himself	Season 2 Episode 4 "Queens or Divas"	
2021	The Sherry Vine Variety Show	Himself	Guest appearance; 4 Episodes	
2025	Drag House Rules	Himself	Season one	

=== Music videos ===
Year	Song	Director
2005	"Twisted Transistor" (Korn)	Dave Meyers
2007	"She's Madonna" (Robbie Williams)	N/A
2008	"Mm-ma-ma" (Crazy Loop)	N/A
2011	"Progress" (Ayumi Hamasaki)	Masashi Muto
2011	"Sleepless in Silverlake" (Les Savy Fav)	Tom Bingham
2012	"Responsitrannity" (RuPaul)	N/A
2012	"Queen" (Xelle)	JC Cassis
2012	"The Chop" (Manila Luzon & Latrice Royale)	Syuji Honda
2014	"Eliminated" (Kelly Mantle feat- Bownce & Wendy Ho)	Kija Manharé
2019	"Elevator to the Gallows" (Senses Fail)	John Mark
2019	"Yellow Cloud" (Trixie Mattel)	Brad Hammer

=== Web series ===
Year	Title	Role	Notes	Ref.
2013	Ring My Bell	Herself	Guest	
2013	WOW Shopping Network	Herself	Guest	
2015	Transformations	Herself	Guest	
2015-2021	Hey Qween!	Herself	Guest; 2 episodes	
2018	Spillin' the Tea	Herself	Co-Host	
2019	Feelin' Fruity	Herself	Guest	
2019	Detailz	Herself	Guest	
2019	Drag Queen Video Dates	Herself	Guest	
2019	Bootleg Opinions	Herself	Guest	
2019	The Browns	Herself	Starring role	
2020	Queen with a Cause	Herself	Two episodes	
2023	Sissy That Talk Show with Joseph Shepherd	Herself	Podcast; Guest	
2023	Queenterrogated	Herself	Guest	
