= Glamazon =

Glamazon, a portmanteau of glamorous and Amazon, may refer to:

- Glamazon (album), an album by singer–drag queen RuPaul
  - "Glamazon" (song), its title song
- Beth Phoenix (born 1980), professional wrestler formerly known as "The Glamazon"
