= Jealous of My Boogie =

Single by RuPaul

from the album Champion
- Released: June 16, 2009
- Recorded: 2008
- Genre: Diva house; nu-funk
- Length: 3:37
- Label: RuCo Inc.
- Songwriters: RuPaul Charles; Lucian Piane
- Producer: Revolucian

RuPaul singles chronology
| "Cover Girl" (2009) | "Jealous of My Boogie" (2009) | "Devil Made Me Do It" (2009) |

Music video
- "Jealous of My Boogie" on YouTube

"Jealous of My Boogie" is the second single from RuPaul's album Champion. It was released to iTunes on June 16, 2009, as part of the EP Jealous of My Boogie - The RuMixes, and released again as track two of the Champion album. The single include ringtones of catchphrases from RuPaul's Drag Race as well as a new version of "Cover Girl" with a rap by BeBe Zahara Benet, winner of the show's first season.

== Promotion ==
RuPaul performed the song at the NewNowNext Awards.

The music video starring Chi Chi LaRue was released May 11, 2009. A second music video which was directed by Mathu Andersen and featured Tyra Sanchez, Raven and Jujubee, the three finalists of RuPaul's Drag Race season 2, was published April 27, 2010. The song was featured in the finale of the second season of RuPaul's Drag Race, being performed by contestants Raven and Tyra Sanchez before the winner was revealed.

== Track listing ==
| No. | Title | Length |
|---|---|---|
| 1. | "Jealous of My Boogie (Gomi & RasJek)" | 6:19 |
| 2. | "Lipsync for Your Life (Ringtone)" | 0:11 |
| 3. | "Jealous of My Boogie (Vibelicious' Jealous of My Booty)" | 3:37 |
| 4. | "Drag Race (Original Theme)" | 0:53 |
| 5. | "Jealous of My Boogie (Macutchi's Wizard's Sleeve)" | 6:24 |
| 6. | "Charisma, Uniqueness... (Ringtone)" | 0:08 |
| 7. | "Jealous of My Boogie (Mykonos RevoLucian)" | 3:56 |
| 8. | "Cover Girl (feat. BeBe Zahara Benet)" | 3:00 |
| 9. | "Jealous of My Boogie (Ranny vs. The Popstar Edit)" | 3:50 |
| 10. | "Cameroon (Ringtone)" | 0:08 |
| 11. | "Jealous of My Boogie (Ruru & Rozy Disco)" | 3:26 |
| 12. | "Gentlemen, Start Your Engines (Ringtone)" | 0:11 |
| 13. | "Jealous of My Boogie (RevoLucian's F**k It Up)" | 4:47 |
| 14. | "Sashay Away (Ringtone)" | 0:11 |
| 15. | "Jealous of My Boogie (Gomi & RasJek Edit)" | 3:34 |
| 16. | "Cover Girl (Acappella)" | 2:44 |
| 17. | "Jealous of My Boogie (Ranny vs. The Popstar)" | 7:08 |
