= Shannel =

American drag queen (born 1979)

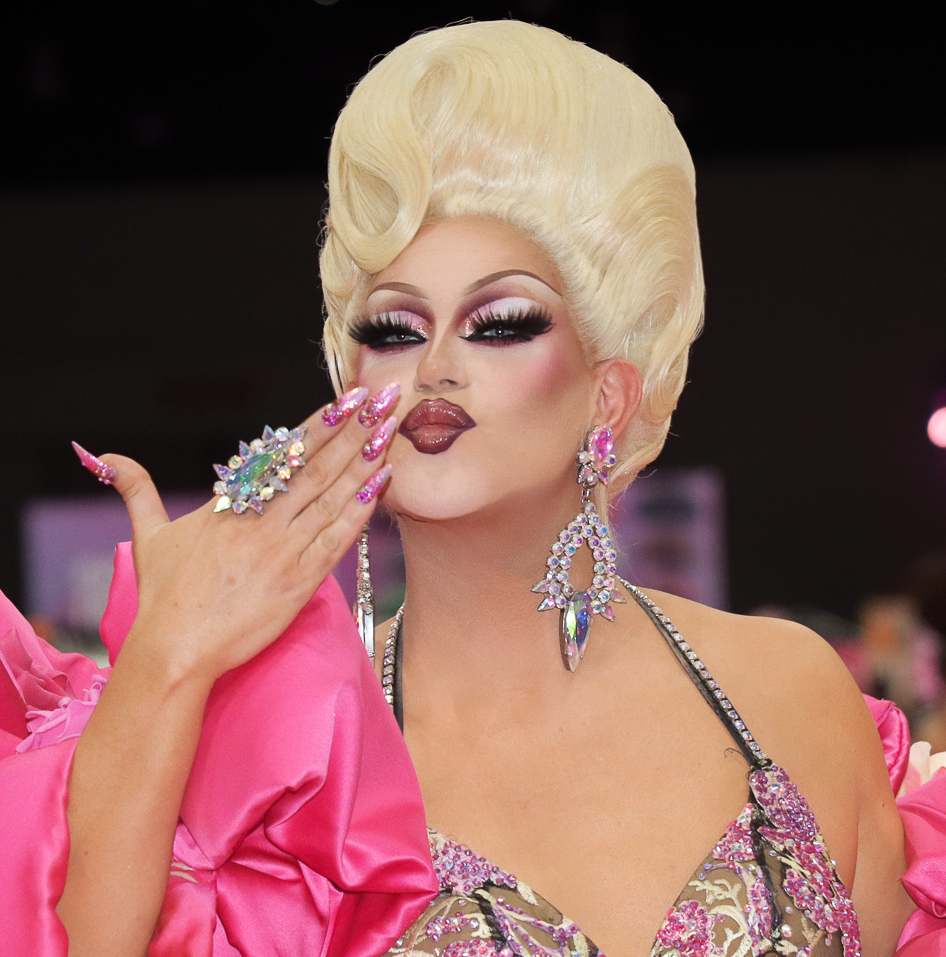
- Shannel at RuPaul's DragCon LA 2024
- Born: Bryan Watkins; July 3, 1979 (age 47); Orange County, California
- Occupation: Drag queen
- Years active: 1994–present
- Known for: RuPaul's Drag Race (season 1); RuPaul's Drag Race: All Stars (season 1); RuPaul's Drag Race: All Stars (season 9)
- Website: theofficialshannel.com

Bryan Watkins, known by his stage name Shannel (born July 3, 1979), is an American drag queen and television personality, best known for competing on the first season of RuPaul's Drag Race and later the first and ninth seasons of RuPaul's Drag Race: All Stars.

== Early life ==
Watkins was born to Debbie and Gary Watkins on July 3, 1979, in Orange County, California. He was raised in Cypress, California, and attended Pacifica High School. He was introduced to drag at age 8 when he was taken to a Las Vegas boylesque show, and started doing drag at fifteen years old when he entered a Halloween drag contest under the name “Elvira” and won. A year later, he began working as a makeup artist, hairstylist, and photoshoot coordinator for glamour photography. He worked as a beauty advisor for the cosmetics branch of fashion house Chanel for ten years. He moved to Las Vegas, Nevada in 2000. He owns one of the largest collections of Lucille Ball memorabilia in the world.

== RuPaul's Drag Race ==
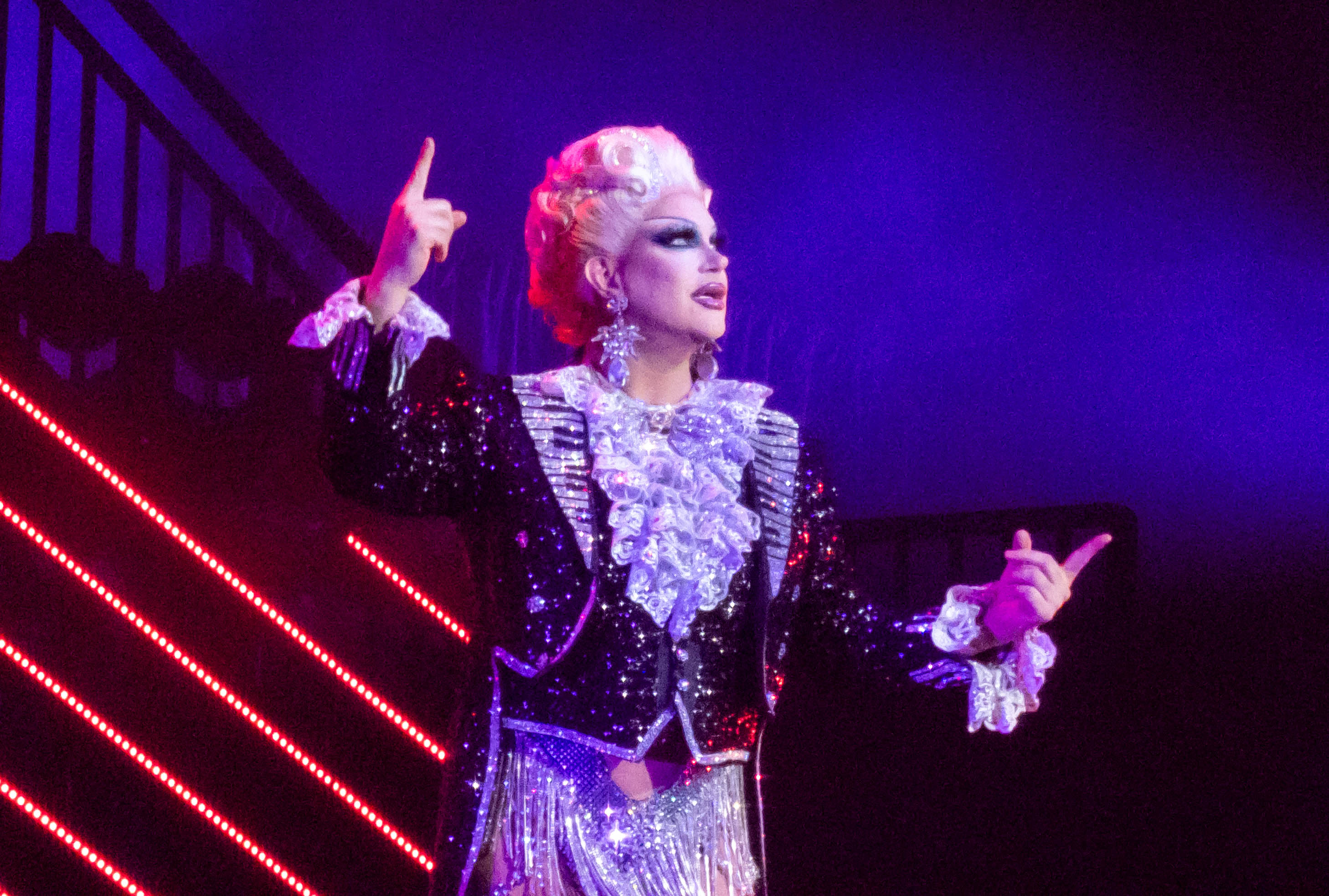
Shannel touring with RuPaul's Drag Race All Stars LIVE, 2024

Shannel was announced as one of nine contestants for the first season of RuPaul's Drag Race in 2009. In the third episode, she was in the bottom two with fellow competitor Akashia, and won a lip sync against her to "The Greatest Love of All" by Whitney Houston. She famously did the first "wig reveal" on the show during the lip sync. She was later eliminated on the sixth episode after losing the bottom-two lip sync, to "Shackles (Praise You)" by Mary Mary, against Rebecca Glasscock; she would attempt to change the narrative by stating she was “choosing” to go home and was, essentially, self-disqualifying.

Shannel was announced as being among twelve returning contestants for the first season of RuPaul's Drag Race: All Stars in 2012. Due to the team twist for the season, Shannel teamed with eventual winner Chad Michaels as the team Shad. They won the third, fourth and fifth episode challenges, until Shannel was eliminated in third place with Jujubee.

Shannel also was a drag professor for three seasons of the spin-off show RuPaul's Drag U in 2010 to 2012.

She appeared as a guest star on the first episode of Drag Race's eighth season. She appeared with her fellow season one cast on the Drag Race season ten finale, lip syncing next to Mayhem Miller.

Shannel was credited as a Creative Consultant for the premiere episode of RuPaul's Secret Celebrity Drag Race. She also made an appearance making over celebrity Nico Tortorella, though it was ultimately cut from the episode.

In 2023, Shannel appeared as the "lip-sync assassin" of the fourth episode of the eighth season of RuPaul's Drag Race All Stars, where she lip-synced against Jimbo to Joan Jett’s “Bad Reputation”. Shannel won the lipsync and, as the winner, revealed which of the queens in the bottom had been voted to be eliminated, which was Darienne Lake.

On April 23, 2024, Shannel was announced as one of the eight contestants competing on the ninth season of RuPaul's Drag Race All Stars.

== Career ==
Shannel lip syncing in 2018

Outside of Drag Race, Shannel appeared in an episode of The Arrangement in 2010. She appeared in the official lyric music video for Lady Gaga's "Applause" with Raven, Morgan McMichaels, Shangela Laquifa Wadley and Detox. She was a part of CeeLo Green’s show, "Loberace", in 2013. She was also in the video for Xelle's "Queen" in 2014. The same year, she began producing her own "dinner and drag" show, "Lipstick & Lashes", in Santa Ana. In 2016, she joined the cast of "53x", a Vegas show produced by the Chippendales. She was part of Frank Marino's Divas Las Vegas show in 2017, impersonating Barbra Streisand and Adele.

Since 2018, she has hosted Drag Brunch at Señor Frog's in Las Vegas alongside fellow Drag Race alums Yara Sofia, Kahanna Montrese, and DeJa Skye, as well as Hot Chocolate and Roxy Brooks Lords in collaboration with Voss Events.

In September 2019, at RuPaul's DragCon NYC, Shannel was named as one of a rotating cast of a dozen Drag Race queens in RuPaul's Drag Race Live!, a Las Vegas show residency at the Flamingo Las Vegas. In 2022, Shannel (billed as Bryan Watkins) was a contestant on the premiere episode of Season Ten of ABC's The Great Christmas Light Fight, where he was awarded the $50,000 grand prize for his decorated house. He also owns his own company, Santa's Helper Designs, which creates festive displays for clients such as Allegiant Stadium. In 2024, she was announced as one of eight former Drag Race contestants participating in Painting with Raven, a spin-off of the WOW Presents Plus series Painted with Raven.

On August 13, 2022, Shannel was accused of stealing seven-hundred dollars out of a female audience member's purse at a drag show. Shannel has since repeatedly claimed that she did not steal the money, stating instead that she took two dollars as a joke and gave it back (which the event organizers said was corroborated "by statements taken from nearby customers and our own security camera footage. Additionally, management counts all tips collected during the show which did not even total the $700 this person alleges was taken from her purse").

== Filmography ==
=== Television ===
Year	Title	Role	Notes
2009	RuPaul's Drag Race, season 1	Herself	Contestant (4th place)
2010	The Arrangement		
2010–12	RuPaul's Drag U	Herself	
2012	RuPaul's Drag Race All Stars, Season 1	Herself	Contestant (3rd/4th place)
2012	RuPaul's Drag Race All Stars: Untucked, Season 1	Herself	
2016	RuPaul's Drag Race, season 8	Herself	Guest; "Keeping It 100!"
2018	RuPaul's Drag Race, season 10	Herself	Guest
2020	RuPaul's Secret Celebrity Drag Race, season 1	Himself	Creative consultant
2022	The Great Christmas Light Fight	Himself	Contestant
2023	RuPaul's Drag Race All Stars, Season 8	Herself	Lip Sync Assassin; Episode: "Screen Queens"; Special guest; Episode: "You're A Winner Baby!"
2023	RuPaul's Drag Race All Stars: Untucked, Season 5	Herself	Episode: "Untucked - Screen Queens"
2024	RuPaul's Drag Race All Stars, Season 9	Herself	Contestant (4th-8th place)
2024	RuPaul's Drag Race All Stars: Untucked, Season 6	Herself	

=== Music videos ===
Year	Title	Artist
2012	Queen	Xelle
2013	Applause	Lady Gaga

=== Web series ===
Year	Title	Role	Notes	Ref.
2009	RuPaul's Drag Race Under the Hood	Herself	Companion show to RuPaul's Drag Race season 1	
2013	WOW Shopping Network	Herself	Guest	
2013	Ring My Bell	Herself	Guest	
2016	The Pit Stop	Herself	Guest	
2016	Drag Makeup Tutorial	Herself	Guest	
2020	Hey Qween	Herself	Guest	
2024	Painted with Raven	Herself	Guest	
