= RuPaul's Drag Race All Stars season 1 =

2012 season of RuPaul's Drag Race All Stars

RuPaul's Drag Race All Stars
- Season 1
- Promotional poster for season one
- Hosted by: RuPaul
- Judges: RuPaul; Michelle Visage; Santino Rice
- No. of contestants: 12
- Winner: Chad Michaels
- Runner-up: Raven
- Companion show: RuPaul's Drag Race: Untucked!
- No. of episodes: 6

Release
- Original network: Logo
- Original release: October 22 – November 26, 2012

Season chronology
- Next → Season 2

The first season of RuPaul's Drag Race All Stars premiered on the Logo network on October 22, 2012. Contestants from the original RuPaul's Drag Race show returned to compete again. Cast members were announced on August 6.

This season features 12 returning contestants representing all four seasons. It aired six one-hour episodes. Contestants were judged on their "charisma, uniqueness, nerve and talent" and, since they competed in teams of two, also "synergy". The winner received a supply of MAC cosmetics, a "one of a kind trip" and $100,000. The theme song playing during the runway every episode is "Sexy Drag Queen" (dootdoot 'doot-swift' Remix) and the song playing during the credits is "Responsitrannity" (Matt Pop's Edit), the latter of which is originally from RuPaul's album Glamazon.

The first episode introduced several changes to the rules for the All Stars competition. Queens competed in teams of two, determined by the contestants themselves. Both members of the losing team would be eliminated each week. The bottom two teams chose one member to "lip synch for their lives". The non-lip synching teammates had the option during the first minute of the performance to declare a "she-mergency", hit a panic button and "tag in" to complete the performance. Mimi Imfurst and Pandora Boxx teamed up to form "Team Mandora", Tammie Brown and Nina Flowers teamed up to form "Team Brown Flowers", Latrice Royale and Manila Luzon teamed up to form "Team Latrila", Yara Sofia and Alexis Mateo teamed up to form "Team Yarlexis", Raven and Jujubee teamed up to form "Team Rujubee" and Shannel and eventual winner Chad Michaels teamed up to form "Team Shad". RuPaul dedicated the first episode in memory of Sahara Davenport, a former competitor in season 2 of RuPaul's Drag Race who died due to heart failure.

The winner of the first season of RuPaul's Drag Race All Stars was Chad Michaels, with Raven being the runner-up.

== Contestants ==
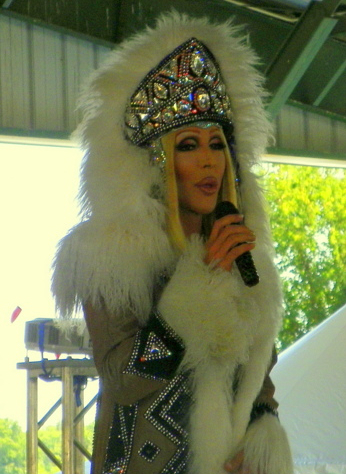
The winner, Chad Michaels.

Ages, names, and cities stated are at time of filming.

Contestants of RuPaul's Drag Race All Stars season 1 and their backgrounds
Contestant	Team	Age	Hometown	Original season	Original placement	Outcome
Chad Michaels	Shad	41	San Diego, California	Season 4	Runner-up	Winner
Raven	Rujubee	33	Riverside, California	Season 2	Runner-up	Runner-up
Jujubee	Rujubee	28	Boston, Massachusetts	Season 2	3rd place	3rd place
Shannel	Shad	32	Long Beach, California	Season 1	4th place	3rd place
Alexis Mateo	Yarlexis	32	Tampa, Florida	Season 3	3rd place	5th place
Yara Sofia	Yarlexis	28	Las Vegas, Nevada	Season 3	4th place (Note: The contestant was voted Miss Congeniality on her original season.)	5th place
Latrice Royale	Latrila	40	Miami Beach, Florida	Season 4	4th place	7th place
Manila Luzon	Latrila	30 (Note: Onscreen caption gives her age as 27)	New York City, New York	Season 3	Runner-up	7th place
Nina Flowers	Brown Flowers	38	Denver, Colorado	Season 1	Runner-up	9th place
Tammie Brown	Brown Flowers	31	Long Beach, California	Season 1	8th place	9th place
Mimi Imfurst	Mandora	29	New York City, New York	Season 3	11th place	11th place
Pandora Boxx	Mandora	39	Los Angeles, California	Season 2	5th place	11th place

== Contestant progress ==
Legend:

Chad Michaels won RuPaul's Drag Race All Stars season 1.
Raven was the runner-up.
WIN indicates that the contestant won the challenge.
SAFE indicates that the contestant was declared safe by the judges.
BTM (Bottom) indicates that the contestant was up for elimination.
ELIM (Eliminated) indicates that the contestant was eliminated.

Contestants progress with placements in each episode
Contestant	Team	Episode					
Contestant	Team	1	2	3	4	5	6
Chad Michaels	Shad	BTM	SAFE	WIN	WIN	WIN	Winner
Raven	Rujubee	SAFE	SAFE	BTM	BTM	BTM	Runner-up
Jujubee	Rujubee	SAFE	SAFE	BTM	BTM	BTM	Eliminated
Shannel	Shad	BTM	SAFE	WIN	WIN	WIN	Eliminated
Alexis Mateo	Yarlexis	SAFE	WIN	SAFE	ELIM		
Yara Sofia	Yarlexis	SAFE	WIN	SAFE	ELIM		
Latrice Royale	Latrila	WIN	BTM	ELIM			
Manila Luzon	Latrila	WIN	BTM	ELIM			
Nina Flowers	Brown Flowers	SAFE	ELIM				
Tammie Brown	Brown Flowers	SAFE	ELIM				
Mimi Imfurst	Mandora	ELIM					
Pandora Boxx	Mandora	ELIM					

== Lip syncs ==
Legend:

The team was eliminated after their first time in the bottom.
The team was eliminated after their second time in the bottom.
The contestant won the Lip Sync for the Crown and was declared the winner of the season.

Episode	Bottom teams (Lip syncers)			Song	Eliminated (Team mates)
1	Mandora (Mimi)	vs.	Shad (Chad)	"Opposites Attract" (Paula Abdul)	Mandora (Mimi Imfurst, Pandora Boxx)
2	Brown Flowers (Tammie)	vs.	Latrila (Latrice)	"There's No Business Like Show Business" (Ethel Merman)	Brown Flowers (Nina Flowers, Tammie Brown)
3	Latrila (Manila)	vs.	Rujubee (Jujubee)	"Nasty" (Janet Jackson)	Latrila (Latrice Royale, Manila Luzon)
4	Rujubee (Raven)	vs.	Yarlexis (Alexis, Yara)	"Don't Cha" (The Pussycat Dolls ft. Busta Rhymes)	Yarlexis (Alexis Mateo, Yara Sofia)
Episode	Bottom All Stars			Song	Eliminated
5	Jujubee	vs.	Raven	"Dancing on My Own" (Robyn)	None
Episode	Final All Stars			Song	Winner
6	Chad Michaels	vs.	Raven	"Responsitrannity (Matt Pop Remix)" (RuPaul)	Chad Michaels

== Guest judges ==
Listed in chronological order:

- Rachel Hunter, actress and reality television show host
- Ross Mathews, comedian and television personality
- Busy Philipps, actress
- Vicki Lawrence, actress, comedian, and singer
- Rachel Dratch, actress and comedian
- Janice Dickinson, model, photographer, author, and talent agent
- Mary Wilson, singer, author, and actress
- Rosie Perez, actress, dancer, choreographer, director, and community activist
- Wendi McLendon-Covey, actress, writer, producer and comedian
- Elvira, Mistress of the Dark, actress and television hostess
- Beth Ditto, singer, songwriter and model
- Cheri Oteri, actress and comedian

== Episodes ==
No. overall	No. in season	Title	Original release date
1	1	"It Takes Two"	October 22, 2012
Twelve all-stars enter the workroom. They are told that they will be competing in pairs for the season. To pair up the queens, each queen will hold up a sign of another queen that they want to partner with. If both queens match with each other, they will form a team.: Chad Michaels and Shannel matched on the first round of voting to form Team Shad; Raven and Jujubee matched on the first round of voting to form Team Rujubee; Nina Flowers and Tammie Brown matched on the first round of voting to form Team Brown Flowers; Latrice Royale and Manila Luzon matched on the second round of voting to form Team Latrila; Alexis Mateo and Yara Sofia matched on the second round of voting to form Team Yarlexis; Mimi Imfurst and Pandora Boxx were matched by consolation as the last two left and formed Team Mandora; For the first main challenge, the queens will create an "opposites attract" and a "half-baked" photoshoot. On the runway, category is Team Unity. Team Latrila and Team Rujubee receive positive critiques, with Team Latrila winning the challenge. Team Mandora, Team Shad and Team Yarlexis receive negative critiques, with Team Yarlexis being safe. Team Mandora and Team Shad are the bottom two teams. RuPaul then tells the queens that only one queen from each team will be lip-syncing. She also introduced the "she-mergency" button, which means that if the queen who is not lip-syncing presses the button, she will fill in for her partner and finish the lip-sync. Chad Michaels and Mimi Imfurst lip-sync for their pairs and they lip-sync to "Opposites Attract" by Paula Abdul. Chad Michaels wins the lip-sync, with Mimi Imfurst losing the lip-sync, meaning her and Pandora Boxx sashay away.: Guest Judges: Rachel Hunter and Ross Mathews; Main Challenge: Create an "Opposites Attract" photoshoot and a "half-baked" photo; Runway Theme: Team Unity; Challenge Winner: Team Latrila (Latrice Royale and Manila Luzon); Bottom Two Teams: Team Mandora (Mimi Imfurst and Pandora Boxx) and Team Shad (Chad Michaels and Shannel); Lip-Sync Contestants: Chad Michaels and Mimi Imfurst; Lip-Sync Song: "Opposites Attract" by Paula Abdul; Eliminated: Team Mandora (Mimi Imfurst and Pandora Boxx)
2	2	"RuPaul's Gaff-In"	October 29, 2012
For this week's mini-challenge, the queens will play In Da Butt Ru, a game showing how well the queens know their partners. Team Rujubee wins the mini-challenge. For the main challenge, the queens will perform in RuPaul's Gaff-In Variety Show. They must do this as a celebrity impersonation.: Raven as Bea Arthur; Jujubee as Fran Drescher; Nina Flowers as La Lupe; Tammie Brown as Tammy Faye; Manila Luzon as Madonna; Latrice Royale as Oprah Winfrey; Alexis Mateo as Shakira; Yara Sofia as Charo; Shannel as Lucille Ball; Chad Michaels as Bette Davis; On the runway, category is 60's Glam. Team Shad and Team Yarlexis receive positive critiques, with Team Yarlexis winning the challenge. Team Brown Flowers, Team Latrila and Team Rujubee receive negative critiques, with Team Rujubee being safe. Latrice Royale and Tammie Brown lip-sync for their pairs and they lip-sync to "There's No Business Like Show Business" by Ethel Merman. Latrice Royale wins the lip-sync, with Tammie Brown losing the lip-sync, meaning her and Nina Flowers sashay away.: Guest Judges: Busy Philipps and Vicki Lawrence; Mini-Challenge: In Da Butt Ru (Knowing each their own partners); Mini-Challenge Winner: Team Rujubee (Jujubee and Raven); Main Challenge: RuPaul Gaff-In Variety Show Doing Celebrity Impersonations; Runway Theme: 60's Glam; Challenge Winner: Team Yarlexis (Alexis Mateo and Yara Sofia); Bottom Two Teams: Team Brown Flowers (Nina Flowers and Tammie Brown) and Team Latrila (Latrice Royale and Manila Luzon); Lip-Sync Contestants: Latrice Royale and Tammie Brown; Lip-Sync Song: "There's No Business Like Show Business" by Ethel Merman; Eliminated: Team Brown Flowers (Nina Flowers and Tammie Brown)
3	3	"Queens Behaving Badly"	November 5, 2012
For this week's mini-challenge, the queens will take manly selfies. Team Yarlexis wins the mini-challenge. For the main challenge, the queens will act naughty on the streets of Hollywood, earning points by doing pranks. On the runway, category is Bad Girls Chic. Team Shad wins the challenge. Team Latrila, Team Rujubee and Team Yarlexis receive negative critiques, with Team Yarlexis being safe. Jujubee and Manila Luzon lip-sync for their pairs and they lip-sync to "Nasty" by Janet Jackson. Jujubee wins the lip-sync, with Manila Luzon losing the lip-sync, meaning her and Latrice Royale sashay away.: Guest Judges: Rachel Dratch and Janice Dickinson; Mini-Challenge: Queens With Guy Phones; Mini-Challenge Winner: Team Yarlexis (Alexis Mateo and Yara Sofia); Main Challenge: The Queens had to act "naughty" on the streets of Hollywood and do pranks.; Runway Theme: Bad Girls Chic; Challenge Winner: Team Shad (Chad Michaels and Shannel); Bottom Two Teams: Team Latrila (Latrice Royale and Manila Luzon) and Team Rujubee (Jujubee and Raven); Lip-Sync Contestants: Jujubee and Manila Luzon; Lip-Sync Song: "Nasty" by Janet Jackson; Eliminated: Team Latrila (Latrice Royale and Manila Luzon)
4	4	"All Star Girl Groups"	November 12, 2012
For this week's mini-challenge, the queens will do a cheer-reading routine. Team Yarlexis wins the mini-challenge. For the main challenge, the queens will form a girl group with celebrity women. Team Rujubee chose Kady Z, with them performing to RuPaul's "Jealous of My Boogie", Team Shad chose Jillian Hervey, with them performing to RuPaul's "Glamazon". Team Yarlexis chose Kelly Osbourne, with them performing to RuPaul's "Cover Girl (Put the Bass in Your Walk)". On the runway, Team Shad wins the main challenge. Team Rujubee and Team Yarlexis are the bottom two teams. Raven and Alexis Mateo lip-sync for their pairs and they lip-sync to "Don't Cha" by The Pussycat Dolls. During the lip-sync, Yara Sofia pushes the "she-mergency" button and she finished the lip-sync for Alexis Mateo. Raven wins the lip-sync, meaning Alexis Mateo and Yara Sofia sashay away.: Guest Judges: Mary Wilson and Rosie Perez; Mini-Challenge: Cheer-reading routine; Mini-Challenge Winner: Team Yarlexis (Alexis Mateo and Yara Sofia); Main Challenge: Form girl groups with a celebrity, and perform a RuPaul song in front of a live audience; Challenge Winner: Team Shad (Chad Michaels and Shannel); Bottom Two Teams: Team Rujubee (Jujubee and Raven) and Team Yarlexis (Alexis Mateo and Yara Sofia); Lip-Sync Contestants: Raven and Alexis Mateo and Yara Sofia; Lip-Sync Song: "Don't Cha" by The Pussycat Dolls; Eliminated: Team Yarlexis (Alexis Mateo and Yara Sofia)
5	5	"Dynamic Drag Duos"	November 19, 2012
For the mini-challenge, the queens will play a basketball game of "FISH". Team Rujubee wins the mini-challenge. For the main challenge, the pairs will create a super hero and a super villain look, with one queen playing as the super hero, and the other queen playing as the super villain. On the runway, Team Shad wins the main challenge. Team Rujubee is the bottom team, with both of them lip-syncing to "Dancing on My Own" by Robyn. After an emotional performance, RuPaul announces that no one is going home.: Guest Judges: Wendi McLendon-Covey and Elvira, Mistress of the Dark; Mini-Challenge: Basketball game of "Fish"; Mini-Challenge Winner: Team Rujubee (Jujubee and Raven); Main Challenge: Super Heroes vs Super Villains; Challenge Winner: Team Shad (Chad Michaels and Shannel); Bottom Two: Team Rujubee (Jujubee and Raven); Lip-Sync Song: "Dancing on My Own" by Robyn; Eliminated: None
6	6	"The Grand Finale"	November 26, 2012
For their final challenge, the final queens have to go to different locations within minutes of each other and perform different shows, consisting of a group interview, followed by an appearance at Hamburger Mary's to accept an award in their honor, and finish up with a comedy routine in front of a live audience. The queens walk the runway one last time. Jujubee and Shannel are eliminated. The final two, Chad Michaels and Raven, lip-sync one last time to "Responsitrannity (Matt's Pop Edit)" by RuPaul. RuPaul then announces that Chad Michaels is the winner, leaving Raven as the runner-up.: Guest Judges: Beth Ditto and Cheri Oteri; Main Challenge: Drag on a Time (group interview session, public appearances at Hamburger Mary's, and a stand-up comedy routine); Eliminated: Jujubee and Shannel; Final Two: Chad Michaels and Raven; Lip Sync Song: "Responsitrannity (Matt's Pop Edit)" by RuPaul; Lip Sync Contestants: Chad Michaels and Raven; Runner-up: Raven; Winner of RuPaul's All-Stars Drag Race Season One: Chad Michaels
