= Eric Buterbaugh =

American florist and perfumer (born 1960)

Eric Buterbaugh (born February 28, 1960) is an American florist and perfumer.

== Career ==
=== Early career ===
Eric Buterbaugh was born in Cherokee, Oklahoma, and left his hometown to pursue a career in fashion in Oklahoma City in the early to mid-1980s. He later moved to Dallas, Texas, where he met Victoria (Torie) L. Steele and worked at her exclusive boutique in the Highland Park Village Shoppes, representing both women's and men's high-end clothing. After she divorced her husband Sam, Steele closed the store in Dallas and set her sights on Rodeo Drive in Beverly Hills. There, she opened a shop very similar to the one in Dallas. Unfortunately, she ended up closing it, due to debt. Buterbaugh was able to parlay his personal style into his next job: at Gianni Versace in Beverly Hills, just across the street, where he would work for several years. After a fortuitous meeting with Sir Elton John, Buterbaugh left the Beverly Hills boutique and relocated to Gianni Versace in Milan, followed by a move to London to oversee Versace’s flagship Emporium. Later, after leaving Versace, he worked with fashion icon Valentino and then celebrity jeweler Theo Fennel.

He left the fashion industry in 1998 and moved to Los Angeles, where he first established himself as a florist when he offered to design an impromptu arrangement for a friend’s birthday party. Over the next two decades, Buterbaugh established himself as one of the most prominent florists in the United States, describing his work as ”Opulent flowers presented in a modern way.”

=== Floral Design ===
In 1999, he established Eric Buterbaugh Flower Design, LLC, and took up residence at the Four Seasons Los Angeles at Beverly Hills. His progressive designs and opulent arrangements have attracted clients among celebrities, society figures, charitable organizations, political leaders, and fashion houses. His high profile client list includes Gwyneth Paltrow, Nicole Richie, Demi Moore, Tory Burch, Michael Kors, Madonna, Dior, Valentino, Louis Vuitton, Chanel, Ferragamo, Cartier, the British royal family, Salma Hayek, Maria Shriver, and Paul McCartney.

Since establishing his company, Buterbaugh has been called upon to design florals for events including Princess Beatrice's 18th birthday at Windsor Castle, becoming the first American to receive such an honor. In 2006, he was asked to design a calendar for the King of Thailand entitled "60 Beautiful Years 1946-2006 Celebrating His Majesty the King's Accession to the Throne."

In 2010, he served as co-host and judge of The Arrangement, an American competitive reality television series featuring ten floral arrangers. The series aired on Logo on October 4, 2010. In each episode, the designers face a "Seedling Challenge" followed by a "Weedout Challenge." The bottom-ranked designers must tackle a final head-to-head challenge, which eliminates a designer from the competition. In 2012, he was featured in the short documentary Herb Ritts ‘LA Style,’ providing commentary as himself on the life and career of Herb Ritts.

=== Perfume ===
In 2014, Buterbaugh was introduced to fragrance marketing executive Fabrice Croisé by former MySpace CEO Mike Jones. The two formed a business partnership and created a line of floral-inspired perfumes “EB Florals”. The brand launched in 2015 with a flagship location in West Hollywood, featuring a perfume boutique and art gallery space. The launch party was attended by a variety of celebrities including Demi Moore, Naomi Campbell, Rob Lowe, Gwen Stefani and Nicole Richie.

== Filmography ==
Year	Title	Role	Director	Studio	Notes	Refs.
2012	Herb Ritts: L.A. Style	Self	Aion Velie	Independent	Documentary, Short	
2010	The Arrangement	Host, Judge	Nick Murray	Logo Network	Television	
