= RuPaul's Drag U =

Reality television series

- Genre: Reality competition
- Presented by: RuPaul
- Judges: Lady Bunny; Frank Gatson Jr.
- Theme music composer: RuPaul
- Opening theme: "RuPaul's Drag U" theme
- Ending theme: "RuPaul's Drag U" theme (Season 1) "Superstar" (Seasons 2-3)
- Country of origin: United States
- Original language: English
- No. of seasons: 3
- No. of episodes: 26 (list of episodes)

Production
- Executive producers: Brent Tacky; Fenton Bailey; Gina Rubinstein; Pamela Post; Randy Barbara; RuPaul Charles; Tom Campbell
- Camera setup: Multi-camera
- Running time: 42 minutes
- Production company: World of Wonder

Original release
- Network: Logo TV
- Release: July 19, 2010 – August 6, 2012

Related
- RuPaul's Drag Race

RuPaul's Drag U (as in "Drag University") is an American reality television series that debuted July 19, 2010, on Logo TV. Its final episode aired in August 2012. It was hosted by RuPaul and a team of drag queen "professors". Drag U was a spin-off of RuPaul's Drag Race. RuPaul confirmed on May 8, 2013, via Twitter that the series had been canceled.

== Format ==
In each episode of RuPaul's Drag U three women are given drag makeovers and taught to access their "inner divas". Each of these hyper queens is judged and evaluated on her "Drag Point Average" (DPA): Drag transformation, Performance and Attitude adjustment. The contestant with the highest DPA wins. RuPaul is the "President" of Drag U. Unlike in RuPaul's Drag Race, he does not appear in drag. Regular judges in season one were "Dean of Drag" Lady Bunny, and "Dean of Dance" Frank Gatson Jr. For seasons two and three, Lady Bunny returned as "Dean of Drag", and various choreographers rotated as "Deans of Dance". Each episode features one celebrity guest judge.

== Cast ==
Contestants from RuPaul's Drag Race appear on RuPaul's Drag U as professors.

Professors on RuPaul's Drag U
Professors	RuPaul's Drag Race season	Season			Appearances	"Wins"
Professors	RuPaul's Drag Race season	1	2	3	Appearances	"Wins"
Raven	Season 2	Main			12	4
Jujubee	Season 2	Main			11	2
Shannel	Season 1	Main			9	4
Pandora Boxx	Season 2	Main			9	3
Morgan McMichaels	Season 2	Main			6	2
Ongina	Season 1	Main			5	1
Tammie Brown	Season 1	Main			1	1
Nina Flowers	Season 1	Main			1	0
Manila Luzon	Season 3		Main		4	2
Mariah	Season 3		Main		4	2
BeBe Zahara Benet	Season 1		Main		2	0
Carmen Carrera	Season 3		Main		2	0
Tyra Sanchez	Season 2		Main		1	0
Latrice Royale	Season 4			Main	3	1
Chad Michaels	Season 4			Main	2	1
Raja	Season 3			Main	2	1
Alexis Mateo	Season 3			Main	1	1
Delta Work	Season 3			Main	1	1
Sharon Needles	Season 4			Main	1	0
Willam	Season 4			Main	1	0

== Seasons ==
=== Season 1 (2010) ===
The episodes start with RuPaul introducing three "students" to their assigned drag professors for each episode. The students meet RuPaul, who explains the competition, and then asks them to "walk this way" to the Drag Lab. The students then meet their professors, who ask them some intimate questions and try to find out what has brought them to Drag U. RuPaul presents each student with their "Dragulator" image and name, and lets the students and professors start working on their images. Each episode includes an "extra credit" game in which students can earn a special prize. They then take part in a dance lesson with the Dean Of Dance to learn the choreography for their performance. On "Draguation Day", the women strut their stuff on the runway, perform their designated song and dance routine, and get graded by the judges on the DPA. The student with the highest DPA wins and is presented with a diploma and feather boa from her drag professor, performing the show's theme song.

=== Season 2 (2011) ===
When season 2 was green lit, an open casting call for women in the southern California area was announced through Facebook. Filming began in January 2011 and changes were made for the new season. The "top draguates" now win prizes, which includes a cash prize of around US$3,166.17. The former extra credit has been eliminated and have been replaced with "Lady Lessons", taught personally by Lady Bunny. The ladies attend a dance class taught by new Deans of Dance and then proceed to the newly renovated drag lab, where the women work with their drag professors on their new image. A new segment, called "Drag Tips" presented by a Drag professor revealing a few drag queen secrets. Another segment, "A Word from RuPaul", shows RuPaul at his desk giving a deadpan delivery of a single amusing word. The next day, "Draguation Day", has each professor introducing their student to friends and family. The ladies strut on the runway and perform for the audience. Students no longer receive letter grades but instead are sent backstage to the green room as the judges deliberate and decide on a winner. RuPaul is present, but does not influence the vote nor take part in it. RuPaul announces the winner and the winner's professor gives her her diploma and a feather boa in the university's colors of purple and orange.

=== Season 3 (2012) ===
Season 3 of RuPaul's Drag U began airing in June 2012 on the logo network. Season 3 featured returning professors as well as newcomers from seasons three and four of RuPaul's Drag Race. In the third season of Drag U, RuPaul's segment "A Word from RuPaul" was altered to include definitions of the word. "Drag Tips" continued, featuring a new professor each week, and Lady Bunny continued to host "Lady Lessons".
