= Nina Flowers =

Puerto Rican drag queen and DJ

- Born: Jorge Luis Flores Sánchez; February 22, 1974 (age 52); Bayamón, Puerto Rico
- Occupations: Drag queen, DJ, music producer, make-up artist
- Years active: 1993–present
- Known for: RuPaul's Drag Race (season 1); RuPaul's Drag Race All Stars (season 1)
- Title: Miss Congeniality
- Successor: Pandora Boxx
- Spouse: Antonio Purcell de Ogenio
- Website: ninaflowers.com

Jorge Luis Flores Sánchez (born February 22, 1974), better known by stage names Nina Flowers and George Flores, is a Puerto Rican drag queen and DJ best known as a contestant of the inaugural season of RuPaul's Drag Race in 2009, placing as a runner-up and the first Miss Congeniality of the franchise. In 2010, Flowers returned to Drag Race to appear as a mentor on RuPaul's Drag U. In 2012, he competed on the first season of RuPaul's Drag Race: All Stars alongside Tammie Brown.

== Early life ==
Flores was born and raised in Puerto Rico. He first discovered DJing as a young child, when he accompanied his father in assisting his friend, who was DJing for private parties. Flores started his career as a DJ in 1989 when he gained residency at Krash Klub, a gay dance club in San Juan that has since shut down. Flores started his drag career as Nina Flowers in March 1993 while studying to become a professional makeup artist. His drag name originates from a combination of the names Nina Hagen, who was Flores' favorite rockstar, and his last name, which translates to flowers in English.

== Career ==
Prior to her television appearances, Flowers competed in numerous drag pageants. In 1999, Flowers won both the Miss Puerto Rico Continental and Miss City Lights Continental pageants.

The publicity generated by her participation on RuPaul's Drag Race brought many new opportunities for Flowers to perform at various national and international LGBT events including Denver Pride, San Juan Pride, Chicago Pride and Vancouver Pride. Besides her participation on RuPaul's Drag Race, Flowers (along with season two contestant Jessica Wild) has performed on the popular Puerto Rican singing competition show Objetivo Fama, which airs throughout the United States and Latin America.

=== RuPaul's Drag Race ===
In February 2009, Flowers became a cast member on the first season of Logo reality series RuPaul's Drag Race. Flowers finished in second place and won the Miss Congeniality award during the season's reunion special, making her the first runner-up to win the title and highest ever Miss Congeniality in the history of the show. She is also the first ever contestant to win a maxi challenge in the history of the show as well as the first contestant to never place in the bottom two.

In early 2010, Flowers joined the cast of Logo's new reality series RuPaul's Drag U as a drag mentor. This summer replacement series premiered on July 19, 2010. Flowers was one of 12 past Drag Race contestants in the season-one cast of RuPaul's Drag Race: All Stars, which premiered on the Logo network on October 22, 2012. Forming Team Brown Flowers along with contestant Tammie Brown, both contestants were eliminated in the second episode of the series, which aired on October 28, 2012.

== Music ==
In December 2009, Flowers (in collaboration with DJ Ranny) released his first dance single "Loca". The single has been remixed by William Umana, Joe Gauthreaux, and Manny Lehman. The single reached its highest spot (#15) on the Billboard Hot Dance Club Play the week of January 30, 2010.

Continuing her first venture in the dance music industry, Flowers released her first EP of original songs on July 15, 2010. Titled Start Your Engines, the album is a compilation of six tracks that he and producer/remixer William Umana produced. The first single, "Locas in da House", uses Flowers's trademark catchphrase in a tribal house anthem. In January 2011, Flowers released his dance single "I'm Feelin Flowers", which he produced in collaboration with Miami-based deejay/producer DJ MDW. His single "Rock the Beat" was released on July 31, 2012. Today, Flowers holds DJ residencies in several cities in the US, and describes his sound as edgy, spicy, colorful, energetic, groovy and original.

== Personal life ==
Flowers and his husband, Antonio Purcell de Ogenio, resided in Denver, Colorado from 2009, and moved to Dallas, Texas in December 2020.

On May 29, 2009, Denver's mayor, John Hickenlooper, proclaimed May 29 "Nina Flowers Day" in recognition of Flowers's contributions to the city's LGBT community.

== Filmography ==
=== Film ===
Year	Title	Role	Ref
2020	The Queens	Herself	

=== Television ===
Year	Title	Role	Notes	Ref
2009	RuPaul's Drag Race	Herself	Contestant (2nd place)	
2010	RuPaul's Drag U	Herself		
2012	RuPaul's Drag Race All Stars	Herself	Contestant (9th/10th place)	
2012	RuPaul's Drag Race All Stars: Untucked	Herself	Contestant (9th/10th place)	

=== Music videos ===
Year	Title	Artist	Ref.
2009	"Cover Girl"	RuPaul	
2012	"Responsitrannity"	RuPaul	
2014	"I Look Fuckin Cool"	Adore Delano ft. Alaska Thunderfuck	
2016	"Backstabber"	Fior	

=== Web series ===
Year	Title	Role	Notes	Ref.
2013	RuPaul's T-Dance	Herself	Guest	

== Discography ==
Albums

Year	Title	Notes
2019	International Love	With Esteban Lopez and Binomio

EPs

Year	Title	Notes
2010	Start Your Engines	With William Umana
2010	Start Your Engines (Remixes)	With William Umana
2016	Damelo	With Erick Ibiza
2023	Arrecha	With Tribal Land

Singles

Year	Title	Notes
2011	I'm Feeling Flowers	
2011	Tip	Featured artist for William Umana
2011	Bailar	With DJ MDW
2012	Rock The Beat	With William Umana
2013	The Queens	With DJ MDW and VButterfly La Mariposa
2013	Cafre	Featured artist for Cindel
2013	Tekila	Featured artist for Armenta Violinist
2015	Drums (For The Diva)	Featured artist for Peter Presta
2015	My House	Featured artist for Alan Capetillo
2016	Beat It, Bitch	
2016	Subelo	Featured artist for Erich Ensastigue & DJ CARLOS G
2016	Flow	Featured artist for Obra Primitiva
2016	Intersection	With Jossep Garcia
2016	Intensity	Featured artist for Jersey Beeats & Erick Martell
2016	Eternal	With DJ Goozo and Jr Loppez
2016	De Tin Marin de Do Pingue	Featured artist for Armenta Violinist
2016	Deranged	Featured artist for Jesus Montañez
2016	International Superstar	Featured artist for Paulo Pacheco
2017	La Bomba	Featured artist for Daniel Castillo
2017	Dreams	Featured artist for Ralph Oliver
2017	Tambores	Featured artist for Bio Zounds
2019	The Flash	With Erick Ibiza
2019	La del Cuerpo	With Luis Erre
2019	Halloween Fest Bogota	With Omar Segura
2020	El Ritmo	With Moussa
2020	La Regia	With Omar Segura
2020	The Cha Cha	With Obra Primitiva
2020	Un Poquito	With Guy Scheiman
2020	Satyricon	With Bruno Knauer
2021	Queer Universe	With Rafael Dutra and Junior Senna
2021	La Moza	With Alan Capetillo
2021	Stitches	With Dani Brasil
2022	Revulera	With Erick Ibiza
2022	Matrix Sun Festival (Official Anthem)	With Manuel de Diego
2022	Everytime You Lie	With Micky Friedmann
2022	Pelo P'atras	With De Felipe
2022	Industry	With Luis Vazquez
2022	Mamacita	With Cajjmere Wray
2022	Me Da Calor	With Jesus Montañez
2022	Sabrosura	With Las Bibas From Vizcaya
2023	High Heels	With Rafael Barreto and Lourenzo
2023	Boom Boom	With Omar Segura
2023	La Borracha	With Erick Ibiza
2024	Ricura	With Isis Muretech
2024	Prayer	With Cindel
2024	Ciao Guapa	With Leo Blanco
