= Champion (RuPaul album) =

Studio album by RuPaul
- Released: February 24, 2009
- Recorded: 2008–2009
- Genres: Dance; R&B
- Length: 47:12
- Label: RuCo Inc.
- Producer: Lucian Piane

RuPaul chronology
Red Hot (2004)	Champion (2009)	Glamazon (2011)

Singles from Champion
- 1. "Cover Girl" Released: February 3, 2009; 2. "Jealous of My Boogie" Released: June 16, 2009; 3. "Devil Made Me Do It" Released: December 2009; 4. "Tranny Chaser" Released: December 2009

Champion is the fifth studio album from singer and drag queen RuPaul. It was released on February 24, 2009. The album is a mix of dance, electro pop, R&B, and hip-hop. The album failed to reach the Billboard 200, however, it managed to peak at number 12 on the Billboard Dance/Electronic Albums as well as number 26 on the Billboard Top Heatseekers chart.

== Background ==
On January 5, 2009, RuPaul released the world premiere of the album's first single "Cover Girl" on his MySpace profile and his blog. It was premiered as a promotional video which included footage from RuPaul's Drag Race. The single was later available as a download on February 11, 2009, or as a CD directly from RuPaul's webpage (released in the "RuCo, Inc." imprint RuPaul founded for his last 3 albums.)

It was recorded in the bedroom of record producer Lucian Piane's home, with the closet serving as the vocal booth. Work on the album was complete by February 10, 2009, and the album was released February 24, 2009. After receiving an initial release online, the album is now available on the physical CD format from RuPaul's website and other major on-line retailers.

March 17 the video of the second single Jealous of My Boogie was released.

December 2009 music videos for "Tranny Chaser" & "Devil Made Me Do It" were released in arrival of Season 2 of "RuPaul's Drag Race".

According to RuPaul, "The theme of this album is stepping up to your throne, owning your power, and saying goodbye to playing small. There has been a shift in consciousness socially, politically and spiritually. The time has come for you to be [a]... Champion".

RuPaul has also said that the album is his best, adding, "I understand what the public wants from me - and I am letting these children have it!". To this end, the album is strongly directed to a gay audience (even more so than previous RuPaul albums). The song "Tranny Chaser", for instance, is a comedic hip-hop track about sexually curious heterosexual men who pursue casual sex with transgender women. In it RuPaul sings "Is some tranny chasers up in here? Welcome to my stratosphere! Make a move...what you gonna do? I ain't got no time for no lookie-loo, boo!"; and later, "Do you wanna fuck me? That don't make you gay!"

Another song, "Let's Turn the Night", correlates the Proposition 8 struggle in California with the story of Harvey Milk; according to RuPaul, "Lucian and I wrote the song during the height of the prop 8 protests here in West Hollywood."

The album's title song "Champion", played throughout Abercrombie kids stores during the Spring 2009 season. Two other songs featured on the album "Let's Turn the Night" and "Jealous of My Boogie" have also been played throughout all Abercrombie & Fitch stores in the summer and fall of 2009.

== Track listing ==
All songs written by RuPaul Charles and Lucian Piane.

No.	Title	Length
1.	"Main Event"	4:30
2.	"Jealous of My Boogie"	3:38
3.	"Cover Girl"	2:59
4.	"Tranny Chaser"	3:36
5.	"LadyBoy"	3:05
6.	"Champion"	3:37
7.	"Never Go Home Again"	4:43
8.	"Destiny Is Mine"	3:48
9.	"Let's Turn the Night"	3:46
10.	"Devil Made Me Do It"	3:05
11.	"Theme from 'Drag Race'"	4:47
12.	"Throw Ya Hands Up" (with Lady Bunny)	5:48

== Chart performance ==
=== Album ===
Chart (2009)	Peak position
U.S. Billboard Dance/Electronic Albums	12
U.S. Billboard Top Heatseekers	26
