= The Arrangement (2010 TV series) =

- Title card
- Country of origin: United States
- Original language: English
- No. of seasons: 1
- No. of episodes: 8

Production
- Running time: 45 min.

Original release
- Network: Logo
- Release: October 4 – December 1, 2010

The Arrangement is an American competitive reality television series featuring ten floral arrangers. The contestants face challenges in each episode to win the title of "America's Best Floral Designer" and win a prize package of a Smart Fortwo Passion Coupe and $25,000. The series began airing on Logo on October 4, 2010. Gigi Levangie Grazer and celebrity floral arranger Eric Buterbaugh host and serve as judges.

In each episode the designers face a "Seedling Challenge" followed by a "Weedout Challenge". The bottom designers face a final head-to-head challenge after which a designer is eliminated.

== Contestants ==
- Gloria Baker, Chicago, Illinois
- Jenny Barker, Redondo Beach, California
- Tara Cottrell, Pasadena, California
- Guillermo del Pero, Pasadena, California
- Bonnie Kim, Los Angeles, California
- Anil Pacheco, Orange County, California
- Russ Phillip, Chicago, Illinois
- Derek Woodruff, Traverse City, Michigan
- Tenley Young, Burbank, California
- Eddie Zaratsian, Los Angeles, California

== Contestant progress ==
Place	Designer								
Place	Designer	1	2	3	4	5	6	7	8
1	Tenley	WIN	IN	IN	IN	HIGH	WIN	BOTTOM 2	WINNER
2	Guillermo	IN	WIN	IN	HIGH	IN	HIGH	WIN	RUNNER-UP
3	Derek	BOTTOM 2	IN	WIN	IN	IN	IN	IN	OUT
4	Tara	WIN	IN	HIGH	WIN	BOTTOM 2	BOTTOM 2	OUT	
5	Anil	IN	HIGH	IN	BOTTOM 2	WIN	OUT		
6	Eddie	WIN	IN	BOTTOM 2	IN	OUT			
7	Jenny	WIN	BOTTOM 2	IN	OUT				
8	Russ	IN	IN	OUT					
9	Gloria	WIN	OUT						
10	Bonnie	OUT							

(WINNER) The designer won the competition.
(RUNNER-UP) The designer received second place.
(WIN) The designer or design team was the winner of the episode's Weedout Challenge.
(HIGH) The designer was considered for the win/performed well in the episode's Weedout Challenge.
(IN) The designer advanced to the next challenge.
(BOTTOM 2) The designer was up for elimination.
(OUT) The designer was eliminated from the competition.

== Episodes ==
=== Episode 1 ===
original airdate October 4, 2010

- Seedling Challenge: In teams of two, create arrangements on nude sushi models.

- Seedling Challenge winners: Guillermo and Jenny

- Weedout Challenge: In teams of five led by Guillermo and Jenny, decorate two human figures entirely with natural materials to capture the Americana at Brand experience.

- Weedout Challenge winners: Jenny's team

- Up for Elimination: Bonnie, Derek
- Eliminated: Bonnie

=== Episode 2 ===
original airdate October 11, 2010

- Seedling Challenge: Create a bouquet that "packs a punch" and decorate a superhero mask.

- Seedling Challenge winner: Eddie

- Weedout Challenge: Design a "horrifically beautiful" arrangement suitable for the Jigsaw Killer from the Saw franchise.

- Weedout Challenge winner: Guillermo

- Up for Elimination: Gloria, Jenny
- Eliminated: Gloria

=== Episode 3 ===
original airdate October 18, 2010

- Seedling Challenge: Take unattractive bouquets and remake them into new ones for humorous special occasions.

- Seedling Challenge winner: Anil

- Weedout Challenge: Create eco-friendly arrangements out of recycled flowers and organic produce for a "green carpet" event. With 30 minutes left contestants were tasked to create a second arrangement out of fresh flowers and plants and select one to be judged.

- Weedout Challenge winner: Derek

- Up for Elimination: Eddie, Russ
- Eliminated: Russ

=== Episode 4 ===
original airdate October 25, 2010

- Seedling Challenge: Make flowers out of fabric.

- Seedling Challenge winner: Eddie

- Weedout Challenge: Each designer is assigned a couture dress designed by Nick Verreos for which to design a floral headpiece. They each also design a headpiece for the same cocktail dress.

- Weedout Challenge winner: Tara

- Up for Elimination: Anil, Jenny
- Eliminated: Jenny

=== Episode 5 ===
original airdate November 1, 2010

- Seedling Challenge: Create an underwater arrangement.

- Seedling Challenge winner: Derek

- Weedout Challenge: Design a casket display for the funeral of Omarosa Manigault-Stallworth. With 30 minutes left designers are instructed to make a stand-up display from silk flowers.

- Weedout Challenge winner: Anil

- Up for Elimination: Eddie, Tara
- Eliminated: Eddie

=== Episode 6 ===
original airdate November 10, 2010

- Seedling Challenge: Design an arrangement around a woman's shoe.

- Seedling Challenge winner: Anil

- Weedout Challenge: Style a photoshoot celebrating flowers on television. Models for the shoots are the professors from RuPaul's Drag U.

- Weedout Challenge winner: Tenley

- Up for Elimination: Anil, Tara
- Eliminated: Anil

=== Episode 7 ===
original airdate November 17, 2010

- Seedling Challenge: Create an arrangement inspired by the personal body art of a professional tattooist.

- Seedling Challenge winner: Derek

- Weedout Challenge: After consulting with brand manager Kym Gold, co-founder of True Religion, design a floral wrap for the panels of a Smart car that incorporates the designer's brand.

- Weedout Challenge winner: Guillermo

- Up for Elimination: Tara, Tenley
- Eliminated: Tara

=== Episode 8 ===
original airdate November 24, 2010

- Seedling Challenge: Unique rose arrangement

- Seedling Challenge winner: Derek

- Weedout Challenge: Wedding floral arrangements, bouquet, dress and boutonniere.
- Eliminated: Derek
- Final two: Guillermo, Tenley

- Winner: Tenley
