= Hamburger Mary's =

Hamburger restaurant chain with a drag theme

Hamburger Mary's Bar and Grille
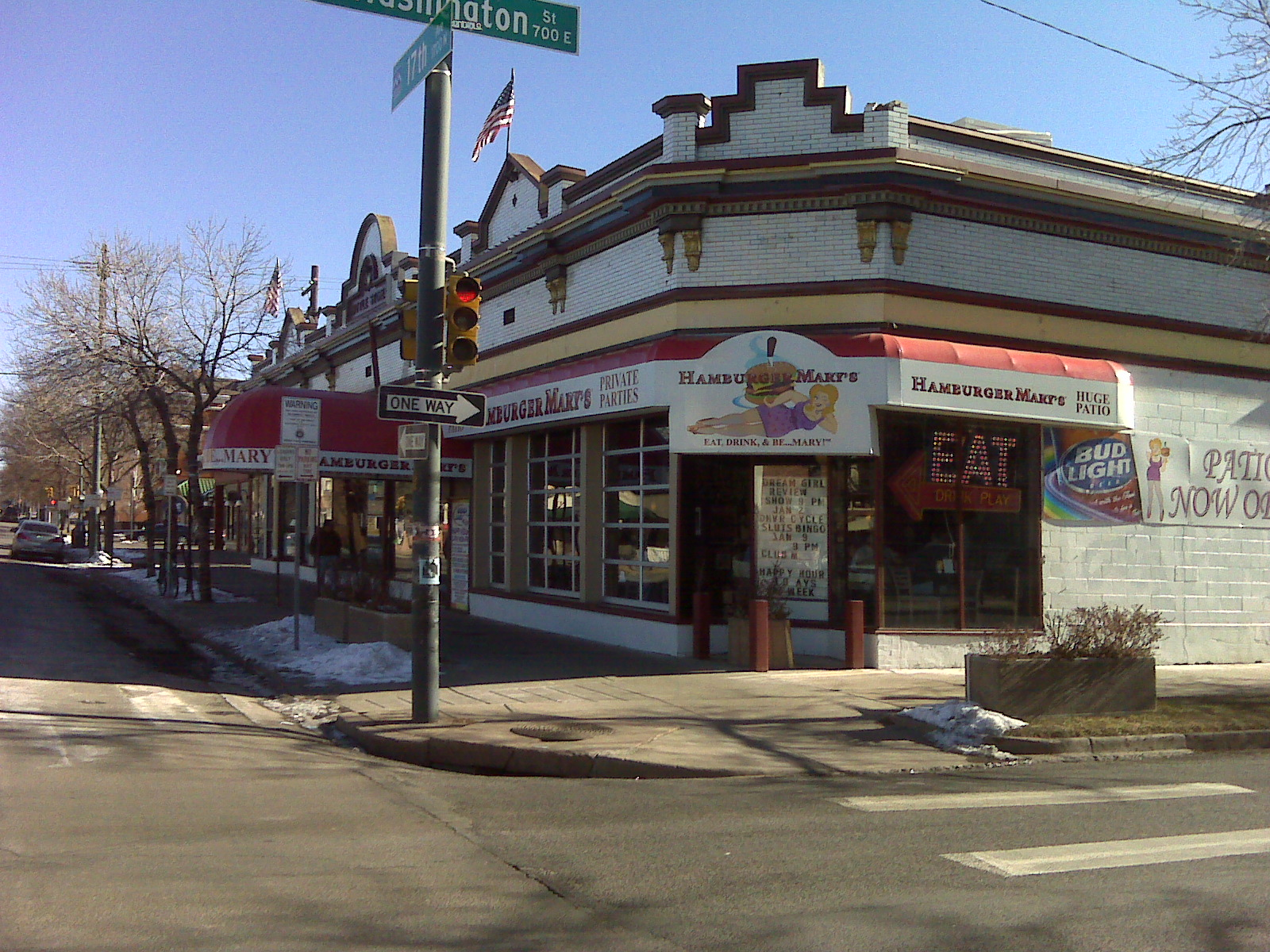
- The Hamburger Mary's in Denver in 2009
- Type: Private
- Industry: Restaurants
- Founded: 1972; 54 years ago
- Headquarters: United States
- Number of locations: 9 restaurants (2025)
- Website: hamburgermarys.com

Hamburger Mary's is the name of several related hamburger restaurants that started in San Francisco, California, in 1972. The name of the business refers to both the original San Francisco location, which closed in 2001, and Hamburger Mary's Bar & Grille, a spun-off franchise with several locations around the United States. The current franchise is a drag-themed casual dining chain The eateries are often in gay districts and are intended to represent stereotypical gay culture through humorously named menu items, flamboyant decor, drag shows, and drag queen servers.

== History ==
"Hamburger Mary" Morris (ca. 1888–1940) was a restaurateur and personality from San Francisco who operated a restaurant known as "Hamburger Mary's" in the Radio City Music Hall area of Midtown Manhattan. The restaurant was very popular with theater people, models, and other, often-struggling performers.

The original Hamburger Mary's continued to operate for some years after the death of Mary Morris. William S. Burroughs used to frequent the restaurant during his early days in New York City and later used the name "Hamburger Mary" for a character in Nova Express and The Ticket That Exploded.

The modern Hamburger Mary's restaurants began in San Francisco in 1972, when the first Hamburger Mary's was opened by a group of "hippies and gay men". Originally occupying a small storefront at Folsom and 12th Street in the SoMa neighborhood, the restaurant soon expanded to occupy four interconnected storefronts. Rose Christensen started as a cook in the restaurant's early days, and after a series of promotions, became the owner and operated the restaurant with her partner Amy Schloss for decades. Christensen's health problems led to their decision to sell the business in 2001 to a buyer who decided not to continue the name. At that time, the place was called "eclectic and wacky, with the spirit of a homey dive". Christensen said of the origin of their restaurant's name:

I’ve heard different stories. I’ve heard that William S. Burroughs in one of his books refers to a ‘Hamburger Mary’. I’ve heard that there was a woman named Mary who cooked food on the streets after the 1906 earthquake and gave it away. And I’ve also heard that it’s the old gay slang, you call everybody 'Mary'. It could be all those, it could be any of those.

By the late 1970s, Hamburger Mary's had expanded, opening locations in Portland, Oregon, and in Honolulu and Lahaina, Hawaii. In 1978, an ownership split took place, with Tom "Toulouse" Mulvey remaining in charge of the original San Francisco location, and Jerry "Trixie" Jones taking charge of the other locations and all franchising rights. The original Folsom Street Hamburger Mary's continued for several decades as a popular San Francisco spot until economic pressures and health issues among the remaining owners led to its closure on April 23, 2001. After the closure, the owners of the Hamburger Mary's franchise expressed interested in buying out the Folsom Street location, however, they were unable to find franchisees. A combination of poor economic conditions during the early 2000s recession and the shift in the gay customer base to the Castro District were cited as reasons why the search for a franchisee was unsuccessful.

The original Hamburger Mary's and the franchise developed in different directions. Although several of the owners and much of the clientele of the Folsom Street Hamburger Mary's were gay, the overall customer base was mixed and it relied less on specifically LGBTQ-related events like drag performances to draw customers. The bar continued to maintain a countercultural, funky atmosphere close to its early 1970s origins. The other locations eventually developed into an LGBTQ-themed casual dining franchise, with cross-dressing waitstaff and drag performances as part of their appeal.

After Jerry Jones died in the 1980s, the franchise rights were inherited by his partner, however, those rights were in turn lost in a lawsuit. A series of ownership changes took place afterward and the franchise developed in a haphazard way, without a clear brand identity and individual locations often operating independently of the larger franchise after licensing the name. In 1997, Stan Sax, who had run the Palm Springs location, and Darren Woolsey purchased the chain, incorporating it as Hamburger Mary's International, and began to standardize the operation of Hamburger Mary's franchises, instituting company-wide training manuals for franchise owners and employees and standardized recipe books for the kitchen and bar. The "Mary" logo was added in 1999. The chain began to expand during the 2000s, peaking at 11 locations across the continental United States, but closures followed, and by 2007 there were only 4 locations. That year, twin brothers Ashley and Brandon Wright, owners of the Chicago franchise, and Dale Warner, owner of the West Hollywood location, purchased Hamburger Mary's International from Sax and Woolsey and the chain underwent another round of expansion.

== Locations ==
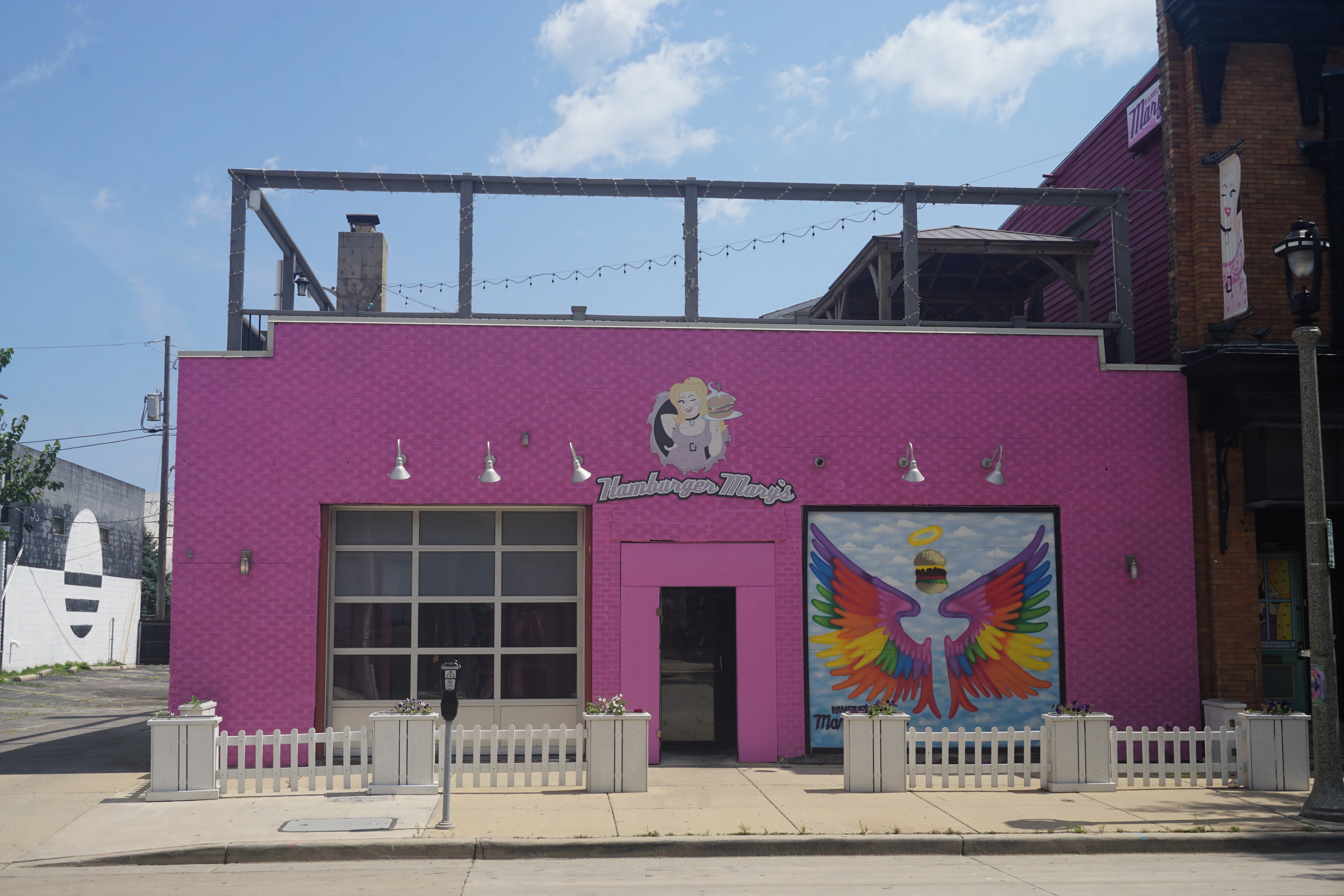
Hamburger Mary's in Milwaukee

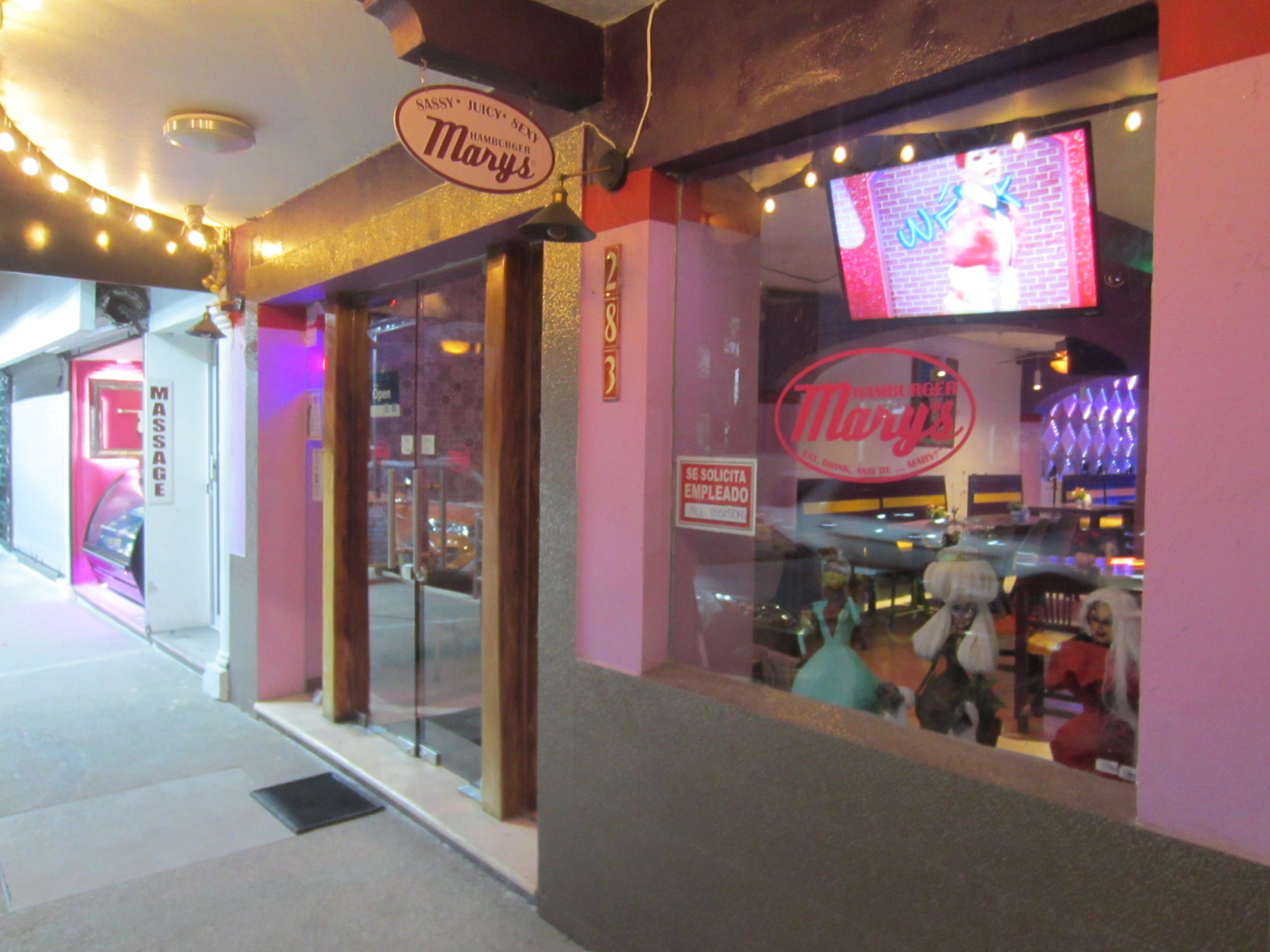
The defunct Hamburger Mary's in Puerto Vallarta, Jalisco, in 2021

As of December 2024, Hamburger Mary's operates in 9 locations in different cities across 7 US states. The West Hollywood, California, location is the oldest Hamburger Mary's currently operating. Over its several decades of operation, Hamburger Mary's locations have opened and closed in a number of cities across the continental United States and Hawaii.

A San Francisco location was opened in Castro District in 2018, the first Hamburger Mary's in that city since the closure of the original Folsom Street location in 2001. The reopening took place amidst existing controversy regarding allegations of discrimination at the franchise-owner's other businesses in the Castro District. The San Francisco location closed in 2021 during the COVID-19 pandemic and, as of 2024, it is not scheduled to reopen.

The franchise has had two locations outside of the United States, though neither of these are in operations as of 2024. A Hamburger Mary's operated in Germany from 2010 to 2013 in the lobby of the Axel Hotel in the Schöneberg district of Berlin. Another location operated in Puerto Vallarta, Mexico from 2021 to 2022.

== Events, entertainment and food ==
Hamburger Mary's is known for its drag-themed events and entertainment offerings. These events feature high-energy drag performances, audience participation, and themed celebrations. The Las Vegas location, for instance, offers a drag brunch every weekend with options for bottomless drinks and a full open bar. A reviewer for the Dallas Observer praised the restaurant's brunch food as well as the drag performances, writing "a succession of drag queens are careening, faux-crooning and somersaulting around crowded tables while songs by Lady Gaga, Beyoncé, and Katy Perry play in the background." They said the food was affordable and quite good, describing the chicken and waffles: "The dish includes a sizable waffle and a few fried chicken strips, each boasting flavorful breading that pairs well with a fluffy, buttery, syrup-topped waffle. It’s filling enough on its own, but if you’re craving something a little extra, you can have your waffles infused with chocolate chips or bacon." The reviewer also praised the "'Big D' Omelette is a keeper", saying "The kitchen staff empties the sink for this one, pouring mushrooms, cheddar and jack cheese into a medley of ham, bacon, onions and bell peppers."

== Challenge to Florida drag ban ==
In 2023, Hamburger Mary's filed a lawsuit challenging a new law by Florida governor Ron DeSantis banning drag performances where children may be present, citing a "chilling effect" on First Amendment rights to free speech as guaranteed by the U.S. Constitution. U.S. District Judge Gregory Presnell rejected the state's request to dismiss the case and granted an injunction temporarily blocking the law. In October, 2024, the United States Court of Appeals for the Eleventh Circuit heard Florida's appeal of the ruling. According to a report by Courthouse News Service, the three judge panel "appeared unlikely to side with Florida officials seeking to overturn a lower court’s decision to block enforcement".

== In popular culture ==
Hamburger Mary's was featured in the "Grand Finale" of the first season of RuPaul's Drag Race All Stars.

In Undercover Boss USA, Season 7, Episode 9, Hamburger Mary’s featured where the co-owners went incognito in their company to ensure that their culture of diversity was being maintained as the business grew.

== See also ==
- List of hamburger restaurants
