= Glamazon (album) =

Studio album by RuPaul
- Released: May 3, 2011
- Recorded: 2010–2011
- Genres: Dance; electropop; house; R&B
- Length: 39:07
- Labels: RuCo, Inc.
- Producer: Lucian Piane

RuPaul chronology
Champion (2009)	Glamazon (2011)	RuPaul Presents: The CoverGurlz (2014)

Singles from Glamazon
- 1. "Responsitrannity" Released: September 18, 2012; 2. "I Bring the Beat" Released: February 12, 2013

Glamazon is the sixth studio album from American singer and drag queen RuPaul. It was released on iTunes through RuCo on April 25, 2011, coinciding with the third season finale of RuPaul's Drag Race. The album is a mix of dance, electropop, R&B, and hip-hop.

== Promotion ==
A promotional music video for the track "Glamazon" was released on April 12, 2012, via LogoTV.com. The video centers on the three finalists of the fourth season of RuPaul's Drag Race (2012)—Sharon Needles, Phi Phi O'Hara, and Chad Michaels—who appear as giant Godzilla-inspired monsters in a retro-style video game setting. Although the finalists are the primary focus, other contestants from the season also appear throughout the video. The queens are shown terrorizing landmarks including New York City, Paris, the Pyramids of Giza, the Palace of Westminster, and the Leaning Tower of Pisa.

"Responsitrannity" and "I Bring the Beat" were released as commercial singles from the album.

== Reception ==
=== Commercial ===
Glamazon debuted at number 11 and number 8 on Billboard's Dance/Electronic Albums and Top Heatseekers charts, respectively. The digital-only release sold 2,000 copies, RuPaul's highest first-week sales since 1997.

== Track listing ==
All tracks are written by RuPaul Charles and Lucian Piane

No.	Title	Length
1.	"The Beginning"	3:50
2.	"Click Clack (Make Dat Money)"	3:14
3.	"Glamazon"	3:37
4.	"I Bring the Beat"	3:21
5.	"Superstar"	3:14
6.	"Responsitrannity"	5:22
7.	"Live Forever"	3:26
8.	"Get Your Rebel On"	3:57
9.	"(Here It Comes) Around Again"	4:29
10.	"If I Dream"	4:37

== Chart performance ==
Chart (2011)	Peak position
US Billboard Dance/Electronic Albums	11
US Billboard Top Heatseekers	8

=== Singles ===
Year	Single
2011	"Superstar"
2011	"Glamazon"
2012	"Responsitrannity"
2013	"I Bring the Beat"
2013	"The Beginning"
