= RuPaul's Drag Race season 1 =

2009 season of RuPaul's Drag Race

RuPaul's Drag Race
- Season 1
- Promotional poster for season one
- Hosted by: RuPaul
- Judges: RuPaul; Santino Rice; Merle Ginsberg
- No. of contestants: 9
- Winner: BeBe Zahara Benet
- Runner-up: Nina Flowers
- Miss Congeniality: Nina Flowers
- No. of episodes: 9

Release
- Original network: Logo TV
- Original release: February 2 – March 23, 2009

Season chronology
- Next → Season 2

The first season of RuPaul's Drag Race premiered in the United States on February 2, 2009, on Logo, and ended on March 23 of the same year. Nine contestants were selected to compete in the running of becoming "America's Next Drag Superstar." The first season was filmed during the summer of 2008. The winner of the first season won a cash prize of $20,000, $5,000 worth of MAC Cosmetics, was featured in an LA Eyeworks campaign, and joined the Logo Drag Race tour. One of the nine contestants to compete on RuPaul's Drag Race, Nina Flowers was determined by an audience vote via the show's official website.

The theme song playing during the runway every episode was "Cover Girl" from RuPaul's album Champion. This season, and seasons one and eleven of All Stars, are the only seasons to not feature a "Snatch Game" challenge episode, in which the contestants must impersonate a celebrity of their choosing while improvising witty responses to nonsensical riddles, in a format similar to vintage game shows such as Hollywood Squares or Match Game.

The winner of the first season of RuPaul's Drag Race was BeBe Zahara Benet, with DJ Nina Flowers as the runner-up.

In late 2013, Logo re-aired the first season, which was titled RuPaul's Drag Race: The Lost Season, with featured commentary from RuPaul.

== Contestants ==
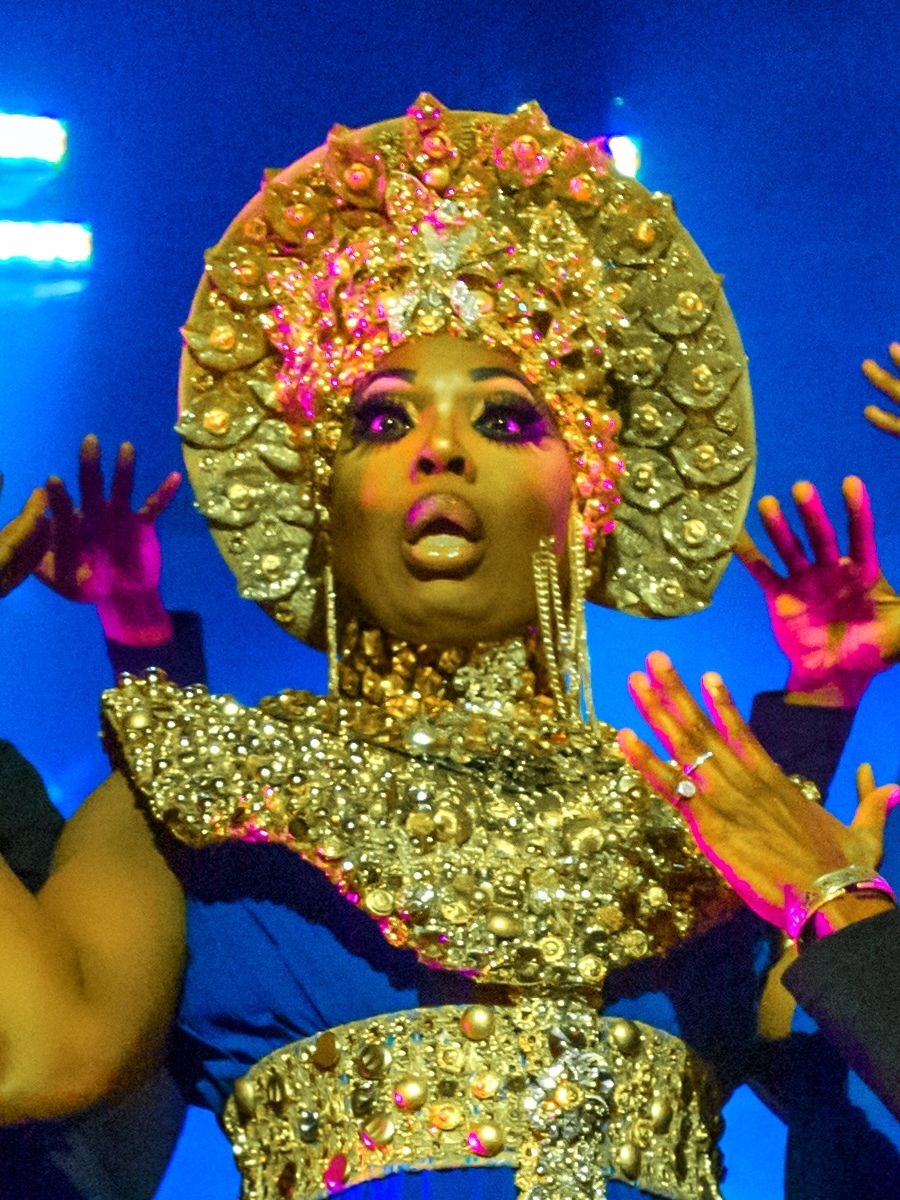
The winner, BeBe Zahara Benet.

Ages, names, and cities stated are at time of filming.

Contestants of RuPaul's Drag Race season 1 and their backgrounds
Contestant	Age	Hometown	Outcome
BeBe Zahara Benet	27	Minneapolis, Minnesota	Winner
Nina Flowers	34	Denver, Colorado	Runner-up (Note: Nina Flowers was voted Miss Congeniality by the viewers.)
Rebecca Glasscock	26	Fort Lauderdale, Florida	3rd place
Shannel	29	Las Vegas, Nevada	4th place
Ongina	25	Los Angeles, California	5th place
Jade (Note: Jade Sotomayor is referred to as Jade on the show.)	25	Chicago, Illinois	6th place
Akashia	23	Cleveland, Ohio	7th place
Tammie Brown	28	Long Beach, California	8th place
Victoria "Porkchop" Parker	39	Raleigh, North Carolina	9th place

== Future appearances ==
Shannel, Nina Flowers and Tammie Brown returned again to compete on Rupaul's Drag Race All Stars season 1, where Shannel placed 3rd/4th alongside Jujubee, while Nina Flowers and Tammie Brown placed 9th/10th as a pair.

Bebe Zahara Benet returned again to compete on Rupaul's Drag Race All Stars season 3 where she placed 3rd/4th alongside Shangela.

Ongina returned again to compete on Rupaul's Drag Race All Stars season 5 where she placed 9th.

Shannel returned again a second time on Rupaul's Drag Race All Stars season 9 where she placed 4th-8th.

== Contestant progress ==
Legend:

BeBe Zahara Benet won RuPaul's Drag Race season 1.
Nina Flowers was the runner-up.
Nina Flowers was voted Miss Congeniality (Miss C) by the viewers.
WIN indicates that the contestant won the challenge.
SAFE indicates that the contestant was declared safe by the judges.
IMM (Immunity) indicates that the contestant was immune for the episode.
BTM (Bottom) indicates that the contestant was up for elimination.
ELIM (Eliminated) indicates that the contestant was eliminated.
Guest indicates that the contestant returned as a guest.

Contestants progress with placements in each episode
Contestant	Episode							
Contestant	1	2	3	4	5	6	8	9
BeBe Zahara Benet	SAFE	SAFE	WIN	IMM	BTM	WIN	Winner	Guest
Nina Flowers	WIN	IMM	SAFE	SAFE	SAFE	SAFE	Runner-up	Miss C
Rebecca Glasscock	SAFE	SAFE	SAFE	BTM	WIN	BTM	Eliminated	Guest
Shannel	SAFE	SAFE	BTM	SAFE	SAFE	ELIM		Guest
Ongina	SAFE	WIN	IMM	WIN	ELIM			Guest
Jade	SAFE	SAFE	SAFE	ELIM				Guest
Akashia	BTM	BTM	ELIM					Guest
Tammie Brown	SAFE	ELIM						Guest
Victoria "Porkchop" Parker	ELIM							Guest

== Lip syncs ==
Legend:

The contestant was eliminated after their first time in the bottom.
The contestant was eliminated after their second time in the bottom.
The contestant was eliminated after their third time in the bottom.
The contestant won the Lip Sync for the Crown and was declared the winner of the season.

Episode	Contestants			Song	Eliminated
1	Akashia	vs.	Victoria "Porkchop" Parker	"Supermodel (You Better Work)" (RuPaul)	Victoria "Porkchop" Parker
2	Akashia	vs.	Tammie Brown	"We Break the Dawn" (Michelle Williams)	Tammie Brown
3	Akashia	vs.	Shannel	"The Greatest Love of All" (Whitney Houston)	Akashia
4	Jade	vs.	Rebecca Glasscock	"Would I Lie to You?" (Eurythmics)	Jade
5	BeBe Zahara Benet	vs.	Ongina	"Stronger" (Britney Spears)	Ongina
6	Rebecca Glasscock	vs.	Shannel	"Shackles (Praise You)" (Mary Mary)	Shannel
Episode	Final contestants			Song	Winner
8	BeBe Zahara Benet	vs.	Nina Flowers	"Cover Girl (Put the Bass in Your Walk)" (RuPaul)	BeBe Zahara Benet

== Guest judges ==
Listed in chronological order:

- Bob Mackie, fashion designer
- Mike Ruiz, photographer
- Frank Gatson, director and choreographer
- Michelle Williams, singer and actress
- Howard Bragman, writer and lecturer
- Debra Wilson, actress and comedian
- Gordon Espinet, make-up artist
- Jenny Shimizu, model and actress
- Lucy Lawless, actress and singer
- Robin Antin, dancer, choreographer, and actress
- Jeffrey Moran, Absolut Vodka marketing/branding executive
- María Conchita Alonso, singer-songwriter and actress

== Episodes ==
No. overall	No. in season	Title	Original release date
1	1	"Drag on a Dime"	February 2, 2009
Nine drag queens enter the workroom. For the first mini-challenge, the queens do a sexy carwash photoshoot. For the main challenge, the queens create an outfit made from items from the thrift store. On the runway, Nina Flowers and Ongina receive positive critiques, with Nina Flowers winning the challenge. Akashia, Rebecca Glasscock and Victoria "Porkchop" Parker receive negative critiques, with Rebecca Glasscock being safe. Akashia and Victoria "Porkchop" Parker lip-sync to "Supermodel (You Better Work)" by RuPaul. Akashia wins the lip-sync and Victoria "Porkchop" Parker is the first queen to sashay away.: Guest Judges: Bob Mackie and Mike Ruiz; Mini-Challenge: Sexy carwash photoshoot; Main Challenge: Create an outfit made from items from the thrift store; Challenge Winner: Nina Flowers; Challenge Prize: A stay at Paris Hotel in Las Vegas; Bottom Two: Akashia and Victoria "Porkchop" Parker; Lip-Sync Song: "Supermodel (You Better Work)" by RuPaul; Eliminated: Victoria "Porkchop" Parker
2	2	"Girl Groups"	February 9, 2009
For this week's mini-challenge, the queens take pictures of themselves acting out certain emotions with a digital camera. For winning the mini-challenge, Akashia and Ongina are named team leaders and tasked with choosing their teammates for the main challenge: a Destiny's Child girl group battle.: Team Serving Fish performing "Say My Name" - Nina Flowers (hair), Ongina (choreography), Rebecca Glasscock (costume design) and Shannel (makeup); Team 3D performing "Independent Women Part I" - Akashia (makeup), BeBe Zahara Benet (hair), Jade (choreography) and Tammie Brown (costume design); On the runway, Serving Fish is praised as the winning team, with Ongina winning the challenge. 3D is named as the losing team, with Akashia and Tammie Brown being announced as the bottom two. They lip-sync to "We Break the Dawn" by Michelle Williams. Akashia wins the lip-sync and Tammie Brown sashays away.: Guest Judges: Frank Gatson and Michelle Williams; Mini-Challenge: Act out certain emotions and take pictures of themselves in those emotions with a digital camera; Mini-Challenge Winners: Akashia and Ongina; Main Challenge: Destiny's Child girl group battle; Challenge Winner: Ongina; Challenge Prize: A basket of chocolates courtesy of Karma and Vojeur Chocolate; Bottom Two: Akashia and Tammie Brown; Lip-Sync Song: "We Break the Dawn" by Michelle Williams; Eliminated: Tammie Brown
3	3	"Queens of All Media"	February 16, 2009
For this week's main challenge, the queens have to channel Oprah Winfrey in the following television personality roles: first as a newscaster reading mock news stories from a teleprompter, second as a product spokesperson attempting to sell certain items, and finally as a talk show host interviewing Tori Spelling and Dean McDermott. On the runway, category is Dress to Impress. BeBe Zahara Benet, Nina Flowers and Ongina receive positive critiques, with BeBe Zahara Benet winning the challenge. Akashia, Jade and Shannel receive negative critiques, with Jade being safe. Akashia and Shannel lip-sync to "The Greatest Love of All" by Whitney Houston. Shannel wins the lip-sync and Akashia sashays away.: Guest Judges: Howard Bragman and Debra Wilson; Main Challenge: Channel Oprah Winfrey in various television personality roles; Runway Theme: Dress to Impress; Challenge Winner: BeBe Zahara Benet; Challenge Prize: A Sonos stereo sound system; Bottom Two: Akashia and Shannel; Lip-Sync Song: "The Greatest Love of All" by Whitney Houston; Eliminated: Akashia
4	4	"Mac-Viva Glam"	February 23, 2009
For this week's mini-challenge, the queens pair up to give their partner a 30-minute makeover. Jade wins the mini-challenge and receives 5 extra minutes in the main challenge: writing a Mac-Viva Glam commercial before having 10 minutes to film it. On the runway, BeBe Zahara Benet, Nina Flowers and Ongina receive positive critiques, with Ongina winning the challenge. Jade, Rebecca Glasscock and Shannel receive negative critiques, with Shannel being safe. Jade and Rebecca Glasscock lip-sync to "Would I Lie To You?" by The Eurythmics. Rebecca Glasscock wins the lip-sync and Jade sashays away.: Guest Judges: Gordon Espinet and Jenny Shimizu; Mini-Challenge: In pairs, give your partner a 30 minute makeover; Mini-Challenge Winner: Jade; Main Challenge: Write and film a Mac-Viva Glam commercial; Challenge Winner: Ongina; Challenge Prize: Mac-Viva Glam ambassadorship; Bottom Two: Jade and Rebecca Glasscock; Lip-Sync Song: "Would I Lie To You?" by The Eurythmics; Eliminated: Jade
5	5	"Drag School of Charm"	March 2, 2009
For this week's mini-challenge, the queens have to outlast their opponents in an endurance challenge. Rebecca Glasscock wins the mini-challenge and is given the responsibility of assigning the queens' partners for the main challenge: female extreme fighters to makeover into their drag daughters. On the runway, Rebecca Glasscock and Shannel receive positive critiques, with Rebecca Glasscock winning the challenge. BeBe Zahara Benet, Nina Flowers and Ongina receive negative critiques, with Nina Flowers being safe. BeBe Zahara Benet and Ongina lip-sync to "Stronger" by Britney Spears. BeBe Zahara Benet wins the lip-sync and Ongina sashays away.: Guest Judges: Lucy Lawless and Robin Antin; Mini-Challenge: Outlast your opponents in an endurance challenge; Mini-Challenge Winner: Rebecca Glasscock; Main Challenge: Makeover a female fighter; Challenge Winner: Rebecca Glasscock; Challenge Prize: Gift baskets from Curlisto worth $1,000; Bottom Two: BeBe Zahara Benet and Ongina; Lip-Sync Song: "Stronger" by Britney Spears; Eliminated: Ongina
6	6	"The Absolut Ball"	March 9, 2009
For this week's mini-challenge, the queens compete in a vogue battle. Nina Flowers wins the mini-challenge, and as her reward, she assigns the flavors for the main challenge: creating three looks for The Absolut Drag Ball.: BeBe Zahara Benet - Raspberry; Nina Flowers - Mango; Rebecca Glasscock - Citron; Shannel - Mandarin; On the runway, BeBe Zahara Benet and Nina Flowers receive positive critiques, with BeBe Zahara Benet winning the challenge. Rebecca Glasscock and Shannel receive negative critiques, and are announced as the bottom two. They lip-sync to "Shackles (Praise You)" by Mary Mary. Rebecca Glasscock wins the lip-sync and Shannel sashays away.: Special Guest: Charo; Guest Judges: Jeffrey Moran and María Conchita Alonso; Mini-Challenge: Vogue battle; Mini-Challenge Winner: Nina Flowers; Main Challenge: The Absolut Drag Ball; Runway Themes: Swimsuit, Executive Realness, and Evening Wear; Challenge Winner: BeBe Zahara Benet; Challenge Prize: A custom dress from Miami Elite Design; Bottom Two: Rebecca Glasscock and Shannel; Lip-Sync Song: "Shackles (Praise You)" by Mary Mary; Eliminated: Shannel
7	7	"Extra Special Edition"	March 16, 2009
RuPaul takes a look back to the best moments of the season. Including unaired clips, the audition tapes of the queens that did and didn't make it to the show, and the Top 10 most memorable fashion looks of the season.: Guests: Merle Ginsberg and Santino Rice
8	8	"Grand Finale"	March 23, 2009
For the final challenge of the season, the queens record a verse and film a spot for RuPaul's music video "Cover Girl (Put the Bass in Your Walk)". On the runway, Rebecca Glasscock is eliminated, leaving BeBe Zahara Benet and Nina Flowers as the top two queens of the season. After they lip-sync to "Cover Girl (Put the Bass in Your Walk)" by RuPaul, BeBe Zahara Benet is announced as the winner, leaving Nina Flowers as the runner-up.: Main Challenge: Record a verse and film a spot for RuPaul's music video "Cover Girl (Put the Bass in Your Walk)"; Eliminated: Rebecca Glasscock; Top Two: BeBe Zahara Benet and Nina Flowers; Lip-Sync Song: "Cover Girl (Put the Bass in Your Walk)" by RuPaul; Runner-up: Nina Flowers; Winner of RuPaul's Drag Race Season One: BeBe Zahara Benet
9	9	"Reunited"	March 23, 2009
The queens all return for the reunion. Discussions include: Victoria "Porkchop" Parker talking about how well she would've done in future episodes, Tammie Brown's quirkiness, Akashia's tearful exit, Jade's frustration with Rebecca Glasscock, Ongina discussing her being HIV positive, Shannel's elimination, Rebecca's fakeness and attitude, Nina Flowers finishing second and BeBe Zahara Benet winning the competition. It is then announced that Nina Flowers is this season's Miss Congeniality.: Miss Congeniality: Nina Flowers
