= I'm in Love! (RuPaul's Drag Race All Stars) =

- RuPaul's Drag Race All Stars episode
- Episode no.: Season 5 Episode 2
- Presented by: RuPaul
- Original air date: June 12, 2020

Guest appearances
- Madison Beer (guest judge); Tessa Thompson (guest judge); Leland; Alyssa Edwards (lip-sync assassin)

Episode chronology
- RuPaul's Drag Race All Stars season 5

"I'm in Love!" is the second episode of the fifth season of the American television series RuPaul's Drag Race All Stars. It originally aired on June 12, 2020. Madison Beer and Tessa Thompson are guest judges. Alyssa Edwards and Leland also make guest appearances, the former to compete in the lip-sync contest as the "lip-sync assassin" and the latter to record the contestants' vocals for the main challenge.

Ongina is eliminated from the competition by Shea Couleé, who places in the top of the main challenge and wins a lip-sync contest against Alyssa Edwards to "Neutron Dance" (1984) by The Pointer Sisters.

== Episode ==
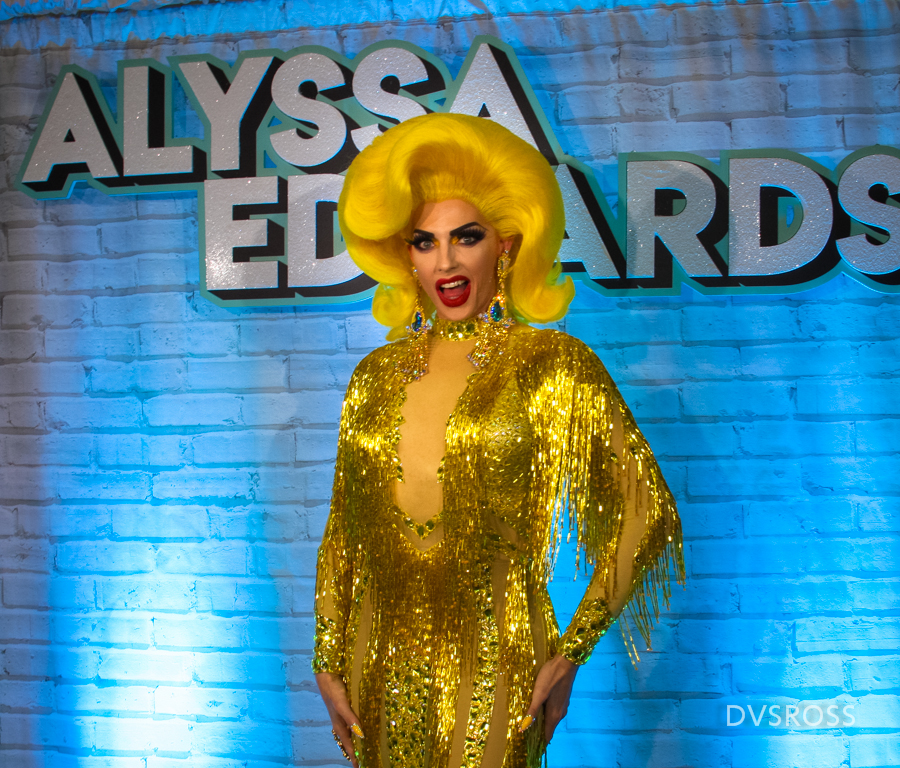
Alyssa Edwards (pictured at RuPaul's DragCon LA in 2018) makes a guest appearance as the "lip-sync assassin".

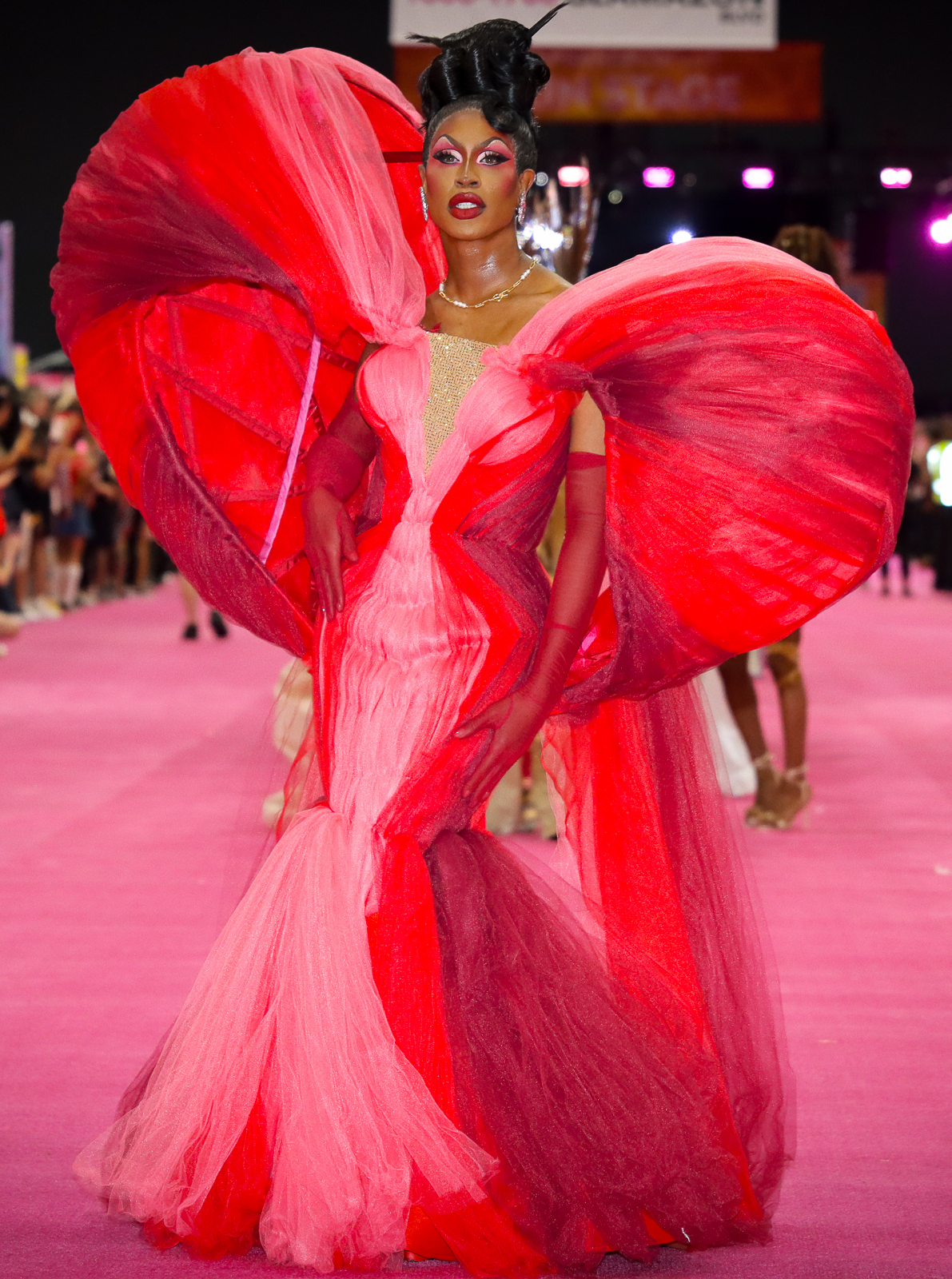
Shea Couleé (pictured at RuPaul's DragCon LA in 2024) wins the episode's main challenge.

The contestants return to the Werk Room after Derrick Barry's elimination on the previous episode. India Ferrah reveals she would have eliminated Derrick Barry from the competition, had she won the lip-sync contest. On a new day, RuPaul greets the group and reveals the main challenge, which tasks the contestants with forming girl groups to write, record, and choreograph performances to "I'm in Love!". The contestants must sing about a celebrity crush. RuPaul asks India Ferrah to name her two biggest competitors. She says Blair St. Clair and Shea Couleé, who are made team camptains. The captains choose their fellow teammates. Following are the team members and celebrity crushes:

Team India Ferrah:

- Alexis Mateo – Daddy Yankee
- India Ferrah – Justin Timberlake
- Jujubee – John Stamos

Team Blair St. Clair:

- Blair St. Clair – Hannibal Lecter
- Mayhem Miller – Mr. Rogers
- Miz Cracker – Sylvester Stallone

Team Shea Couleé

- Mariah Paris Balenciaga – Jason Momoa
- Ongina – Henry Cavill
- Shea Couleé – Chadwick Boseman

The contestants begin to write lyrics in the Werk Room, then record vocals on the main stage with Leland and Freddy Scott. The groups also rehearse choreography on the main stage. On elimination day, the contestants make final preparations in the Werk Room for the performances and fashion show. Miz Cracker talks about her difficulties connecting with people and making friends. On the main stage, RuPaul welcomes fellow judges Michelle Visage and Carson Kressley, as well as guest judges Madison Beer and Tessa Thompson. RuPaul shares the assignment of the main challenge, then the performances commence.

RuPaul announces the runway category ("Love the Skin You're In"), then the fashion show commences. The judges deliver their critiques, deliberate, then share the results with the contestants. Shea Couleé is declared the top contestant of the week. India Ferrah, Mariah Paris Balenciaga, and Ongina receive negative critiques and are declared the bottom three contestants of the week. Backstage, Ongina tells the contestants that she is okay with going home, after thinking it's not fair for the other two contestants in the bottom to go home, which upsets the other contestants. Back on the main stage, RuPaul reveals that Alyssa Edwards is the lip-sync assassin. Alyssa Edwards and Shea Couleé face off in a lip-sync contest to "Neutron Dance" (1984) by The Pointer Sisters. Shea Couleé wins the lip-sync and decides to eliminate Ongina from the competition.

== Production and broadcast ==
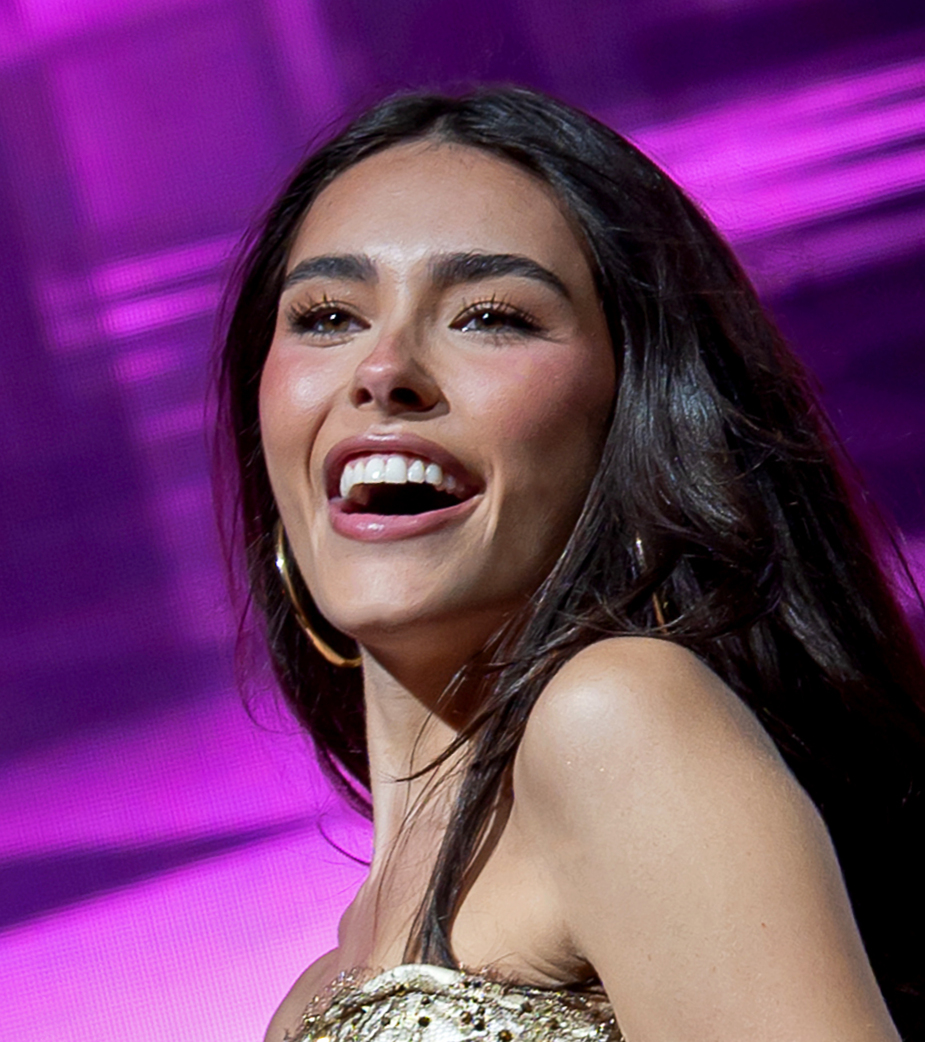
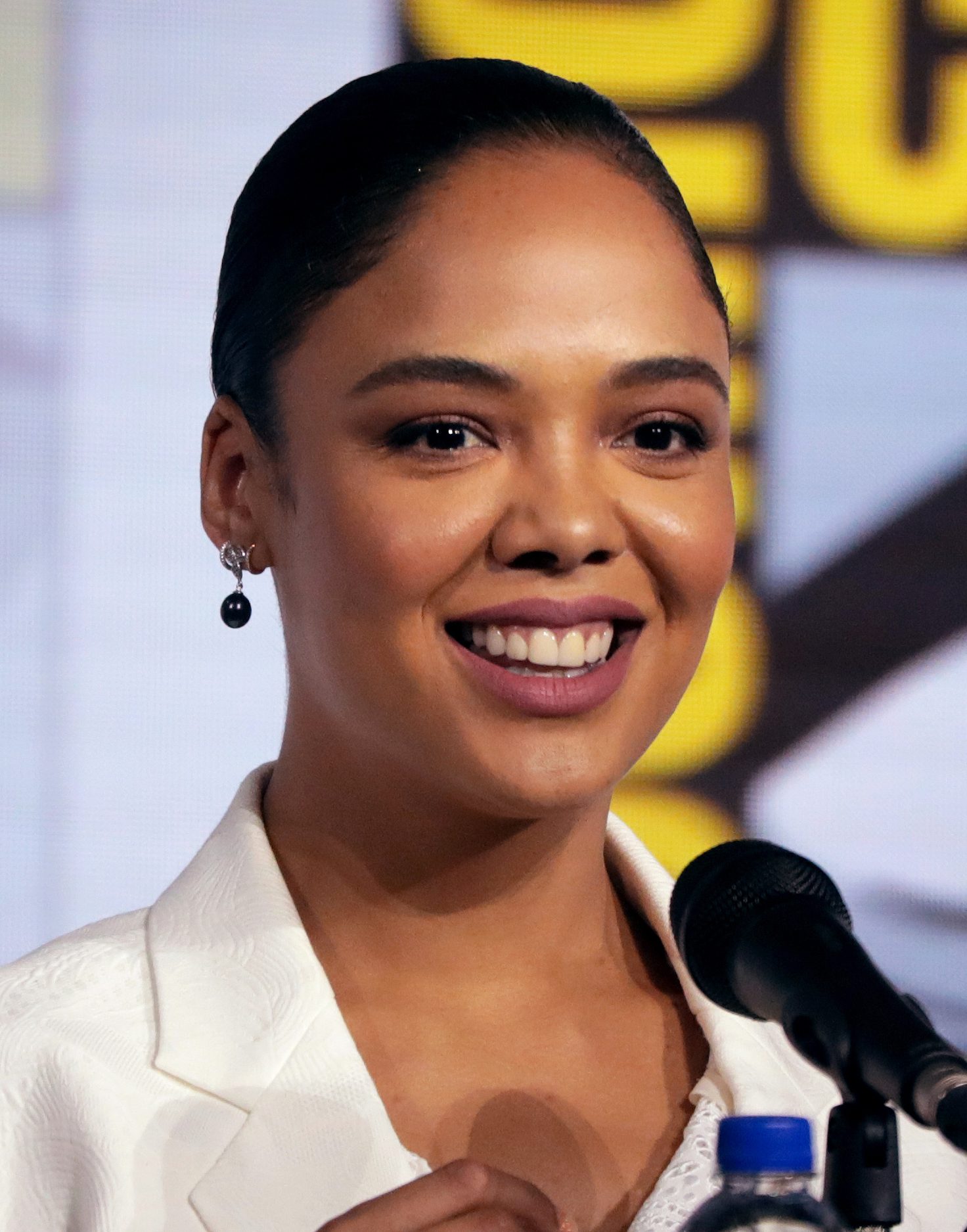
Madison Beer (left) and Tessa Thompson (right) are guest judges.

The episode originally aired on June 12, 2020.

Lucas Villa of Remezcla said Alexis Mateo's reference to Daddy Yankee and reggaeton was "a first in Drag Race herstory".

=== Fashion ===
India Ferrah wears a colorful outfit inspired by racial unity. Her dress has a heart with red rhinestones. Jujubee has a pink dress. Alexis Mateo wears a leather dress. Blair St. Clair has a pink outfit with matching gloves and hat, as well as a yellow wig. Miz Cracker wears a "Jewish princess"-inspired dress and a dark wig. Mayhem Miller has a beaded gown and a dark wig. Shea Couleé has a "Nubian goddess"-inspired bodysuit with rings around her neck and an afro. Ongina's dress has feathers. She carries an umbrella. Mariah Paris Balenciaga wears a light pink dress with a corset.

== Reception and legacy ==
Kate Kulzick of The A.V. Club gave the episode a rating of 'B-'. Paul McCallion of Vulture rated the episode four out of five stars. Kevin O'Keeffe of Xtra Magazine opined, "Shea tore up her 'I’m in Love' verse, and both her choreography and execution were excellent. She also brought it on the runway in her self-described 'Nubian goddess realness,' and served up her Drag Race career-best lip sync to the Pointer Sisters’ 'Neutron Dance.' It’s tough to beat Alyssa Edwards in a lip sync!" In 2020, Ariana Bascom of Screen Rant wrote: "Returning to compete after losing an iconic lip-sync against Sasha Velour, Coulée took no prisoners with her lip-sync to the Pointer Sister's 'Neutron Dance.' Edwards, in comparison, seemed less energetic than usual, making the loss a bigger one than audiences are used to seeing with her." Barry Levitt ranked the "I'm in Love" performance number 32 in Vulture's 2025 list of girl group challenges on Drag Race.

Mariah Paris Balenciaga's verse is referenced in "Moulin Ru: The Rusical", an episode with a Rusical on the fourteenth season (2022) of RuPaul's Drag Race.

== See also ==
- Girl groups in the Drag Race franchise
