= Jujubee =

American drag queen, reality television personality, actor, and recording artist

- ຈູຈູບີ
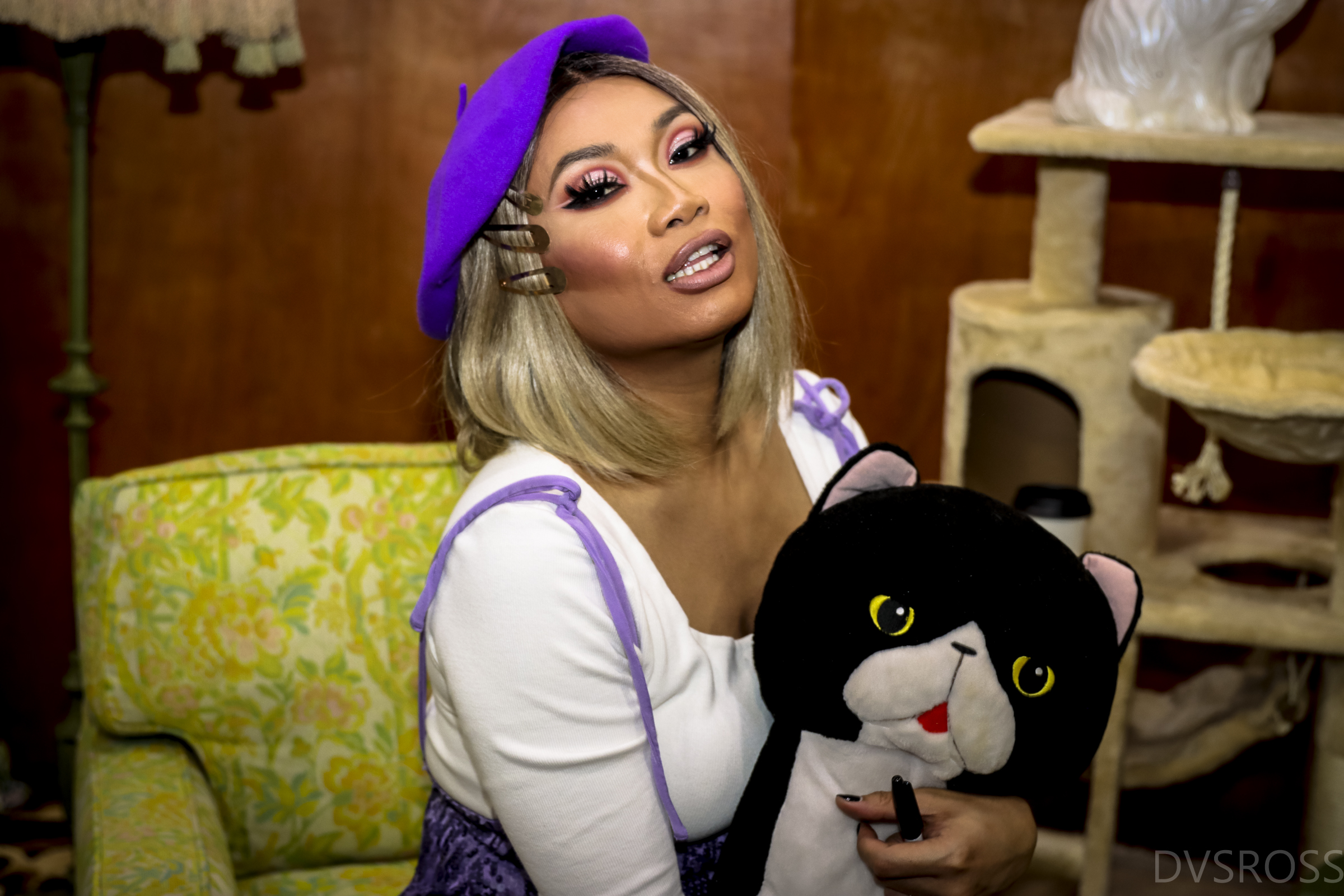
- Jujubee at RuPaul's DragCon LA in 2022
- Born: Airline Inthyrath; June 21, 1984 (age 42); Boston, Massachusetts, U.S.
- Education: University of Massachusetts, Amherst (BA)
- Occupations: Drag queen, reality television personality
- Years active: 2009–present
- Known for: RuPaul's Drag Race (season 2); RuPaul's Drag Race All Stars (season 1); RuPaul's Drag U; RuPaul's Drag Race All Stars (season 5); Queen of the Universe; RuPaul's Drag Race: UK vs. the World (series 1); RuPaul's Secret Celebrity Drag Race (season 2)
- Website: Official website

Airline Inthyrath (Lao: ແອລາຍ ອິນທິຣາດ; born June 21, 1984), known by her stage name Jujubee, is an American drag queen, reality television personality, and recording artist from Lowell, Massachusetts. She first rose to prominence in 2010 as a contestant on the second season of RuPaul's Drag Race, and later returned to compete on the first and fifth seasons of RuPaul's Drag Race All Stars, and the first series of RuPaul's Drag Race: UK vs. the World (2022). She has the unique distinction of being the only contestant to reach the finale of the competition four times. Additionally, she was a main cast member on the makeover television series RuPaul's Drag U (2010–2012), Dragnificent (2019–2020), and RuPaul's Secret Celebrity Drag Race (2022). In 2021, she competed in the first season of Paramount+ singing competition Queen of the Universe.

== Early life ==
Airline Inthyrath was born to a Laotian Buddhist family in Boston, Massachusetts. Inthyrath was raised in both Fresno, California and Lowell, Massachusetts. Inthyrath's father died when she was 15 years old, the same year her mother abandoned her and her two sisters. Her drag mother is Boston performer Karisma Geneva-Jackson Tae. She graduated from Lowell High School in Lowell, Massachusetts. She earned a Bachelor of Arts degree in theatre arts from the University of Massachusetts, Amherst. She owned two cats, Mister and Priss.

== Career ==
=== 2010–2018: RuPaul's Drag Race ===
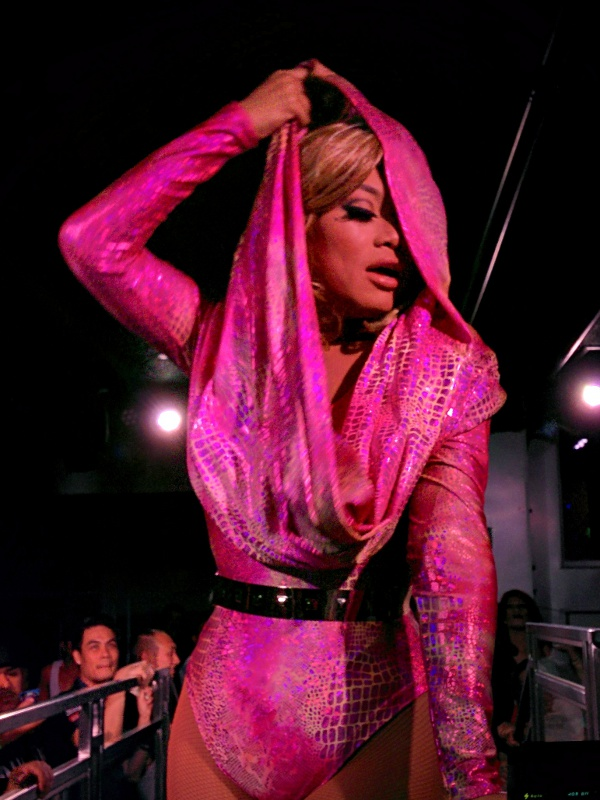
Jujubee performing in 2014

Jujubee appeared on the second season of RuPaul's Drag Race when she was 25, finishing in third place out of twelve. Jujubee, along with fellow season two contestants Tyra Sanchez, Raven, Pandora Boxx, and Morgan McMichaels served as drag professors on RuPaul's Drag U, a spin-off of Drag Race that premiered on the Logo network in June 2010. She made at least one appearance on all three seasons of Drag U. She was also nominated for a 2010 NewNowNext Award for "Most Addictive Reality Star".

On August 6, 2012, it was announced that Jujubee was one of twelve past Drag Race contestants selected to join the first cast of RuPaul's Drag Race All Stars, which premiered on the Logo network on October 22, 2012. Paired with contestant Raven to form Team Rujubee, the duo managed to make it to the finale which aired on November 26, 2012, where she landed in third/fourth place with fellow contestant Shannel.

In 2014, an animated version of Jujubee appeared in the "RuPaul's Drag Race: Dragopolis 2.0" mobile app. She was featured in a series of ads with Gilead to raise HIV/AIDS awareness. She and Raven appeared as guests on "Snatch Game" during the second season of RuPaul's Drag Race All Stars. She was a guest on the first episode of season 10 for the first mini-challenge. She appeared in the music video for RuPaul's song "Jealous of My Boogie". She later appeared in the music video "Queen" by Mimi Imfurst's band Xelle, along with other RuPaul's Drag Race contestants. She was also in the video for Blair St. Clair's "Call My Life" in 2018.

=== 2019–2020: Dragnificent and RuPaul's Drag Race All Stars Season 5 ===
She appeared with BeBe Zahara Benet, Thorgy Thor and Alexis Michelle in the TLC show Drag Me Down the Aisle, which premiered on March 9, 2019. Jujubee appeared in the Netflix series AJ and the Queen starring RuPaul in 2020 as pageant contestant Lee St. Lee.

On May 8, 2020, Jujubee was announced as one of the ten past Drag Race contestants selected to join the fifth season of RuPaul's Drag Race All Stars, which premiered on VH1 on June 5, 2020. She became the fourth queen, along with fellow All Stars 5 competitor Alexis Mateo, to compete on three different seasons of Drag Race, following Shangela, Latrice Royale, and Manila Luzon. She won her first ever main challenge in episode 3, after designing a signature hotel suite entitled "The Glamazone" alongside Mateo and India Ferrah. She would lose her first ever lip-sync later in the episode, falling in a lip sync for your legacy to Lizzo's "Juice" against the lip sync assassin Monét X Change. She went on to reach the top 3 of the season, becoming the first contestant to make it to the finale in three separate seasons.

=== 2021–present: Queen of the Universe and RuPaul's Drag Race: UK vs The World ===
In November 2021, Jujubee was announced as one of fourteen contestants on the debut season of Queen of the Universe, an international drag queen singing competition, and a spin-off of RuPaul's Drag Race. She was eliminated in the second episode after singing Ariana Grande's "Into You".

In January 2022, Jujubee was announced as one of the nine contestants to compete on the first series of RuPaul's Drag Race: UK vs. the World, becoming the very first Drag Race queen to compete on four separate seasons in the franchise. After the show aired, Jujubee announced that it would likely be the last time she competes in a drag competition.

In May 2022, she was the subject of a photoshoot entitled 'Best in Show' with Paper.

==== Queen of Hearts ====
In 2022, Jujubee began hosting a dating game show podcast titled Queen of Hearts. The podcast is formatted as a blind-date game show with the help of Wondery and Amazon Music. Each episode is hosted by Jujubee, who plays as a matchmaker for heartbroken individuals who are looking for love. André Hereford of Metro Weekly wrote, "Episodes typically clock in at 35 minutes or less, with Jujubee guiding each eager contestant — folks of different genders and persuasions — to choose from three potential matches. Upon listening to a few episodes, one thing is undeniable: flirting and attraction come through really clearly in an audio-only format. Voices give everything away." In Out, Bernardo Sim wrote, "In [Queen of Hearts], Juju will help people connect and potentially go on a date together – all without seeing each other. In each episode, Jujubee hosts a series of games and asks several questions to ensure that these contestants can find some chemistry between them." The third season of Queen of Hearts began airing on June 20, 2023.

==== Dungeons and Drag Queens ====
In June 2023, Jujubee took up the role of Twyla in the Dungeons & Dragons themed show Dungeons and Drag Queens, which was also the 18th season of the actual play anthology series Dimension 20 on Dropout. Brennan Lee Mulligan serves as the Dungeon Master while Jujubee plays alongside fellow Queens Alaska Thunderfuck, Bob the Drag Queen, and Monét X Change. In 2025, she reprised the role in the show's second season.

=== Music ===
Jujubee released her debut extended play record, Good Juju: Vol. 1, on June 23, 2020. The song "Don't Wanna Love" was performed on the first episode of All Stars 5. A sequel, Good Juju: Vol. 2, was released on July 21, 2020, with the lead single "Tonight or Forever" featuring fellow All Stars 5 contestant Blair St. Clair being released on July 14, 2020.

In May 2022, Jujubee portrayed the voice of The Tigress in Alaska's Drag: The Musical (Studio Cast Recording), a studio recording of a planned stage production about two rival drag bars that go head-to-head while struggling through financial troubles.

In April 2024, Jujubee announced via Instagram that a new collabrative single with fellow Drag Race contestant Trinity the Tuck was coming out April 26, 2024, titled "Til Death Becomes Us".

== Discography ==
Jujubee discography
- Extended plays: 2
- Live albums: 1
- Compilation albums: 1
- Remix albums: 1
- Singles as lead artist: 11
- Singles as featured artist: 15

=== Remix albums ===
Title	Details
Back for More	Released: March 4, 2022; Label: Producer Entertainment Group; Format: Digital download; Track listing: 1. "Need Ya (Four Names Remix)"; 2. "Round and Round (Bright Light Bright Light Remix)"; 3. "Don't Wanna Love (Bright Light Bright Light Remix)"; 4. "Don't Wanna Love (Interlude)"; 5. "Back For More"; 6. "Bad Juju (feat. Pangina Heels)"; 7. "Back For More (Erik Vilar Remix)"; 8. "Back For More (Tony Ni Remix)"; 9. "Bad Juju (feat. Shea Couleé); 10. "Situationship (Tony Ni Remix)"; 11. "Back For More (Acoustic)"

=== Compilation albums ===
Title	Details
Good Juju: Vol. 1 & Vol. 2	Released: October 16, 2020; Label: Producer Entertainment Group; Format: LP; Track listing: 1. "Need Ya"; 2. "Puppet"; 3. "Round and Round"; 4. "Don't Wanna Love"; 5. "Situationship"; 6. "S.I.S."; 7. "Tonight Or Forever (feat. Blair St. Clair)"; 8. "Queen In Me"; 9. "On My Way"

=== Live albums ===
Title	Details
Good Juju: Live	Released: May 7, 2021; Label: Producer Entertainment Group; Format: Digital download, streaming; Track listing: 1. "Don't Wanna Love - live at EGO"; 2. "Queen In Me - live at EGO"; 3. "Need Ya - live at EGO"; 4. "On My Way - live at EGO"; 5. "Puppet - live at EGO"; 6. "Round and Round - live at EGO"; 7. "S.I.S. - live at EGO"; 8. "Situationship - live at EGO"; 9. "Tonight Or Forever - live at EGO"

=== Extended plays ===
Title	Details
Good Juju: Vol. 1	Released: June 23, 2020; Label: PEG; Format: Digital download; Track listing: 1. "Need Ya"; 2. "Puppet"; 3. "Round and Round"; 4. "Don't Wanna Love"
Good Juju: Vol. 2	Released: July 21, 2020; Label: PEG; Format: Digital download; Track listing: 1. "Situationship"; 2. "S.I.S."; 3. "Tonight Or Forever (feat. Blair St. Clair)"; 4. "Queen In Me"; 5. "On My Way"

=== Singles ===
==== As lead artist ====
Title	Year	Album	Writer(s)	Producer(s)	Ref
"Don't Wanna Love"	2020	Good Juju: Vol. 1	Aaron Aiken, Toni Ni Evans, Jujubee	Aaron Aiken	
"Tonight or Forever" (featuring Blair St. Clair)	2020	Good Juju: Vol. 2	Aiken, Jujubee	Aaron Aiken	
"Together Alone"	2020	Non-album singles	Aiken, Jujubee, Lauren Evans	Aaron Aiken	
"I Used to Be Cool" (Remix) (with Bright Light Bright Light)	2021	Non-album singles	Bright Light Bright Light	Bright Light Bright Light	
"Round and Round" (Bright Light Bright Light Remix)	2021	Non-album singles	Aiken, Jujubee, Astyn Turrentine, Nikki Holguin	Aiken, Bright Light	
"Don't Wanna Love" (live at EGO)	2021	Good Juju: Live	Aiken, Toni Ni Evans, Jujubee	Aiken	
"Life Sentence" (with Tony Ni)	2021	Love Terminator	Lisa Hickox, Megan Dervin-Ackerman, Toni Ni Evans	-	
"Bad Juju" (featuring Shea Couleé)	2021	Back for More	Aiken, Evans, Jujubee	Aiken	
"Back for More"	2022	Back for More	Aiken, Evans, Jujubee	Aiken	
"UBU" (with Jackie Lipson)	2023	Non-album singles	Jacqueline Rose Lipson, Matt Parad	Matt Parad	
"Show Me the Money" (with Betty Bitschlap)	2023	Non-album singles	Airline Inthryath, Anders Bilberg	Morten Kaerup	

==== As featured artist ====
Title	Year	Album	Writer(s)	Producer(s)	Ref
"I'm in Love" (with the Cast of RuPaul's Drag Race All Stars, Season 5)	2020	Non-album single	Thomas C. Campbell, Shea Couleé, Mariah Paris Balenciaga, Ongina, Blair St. Clair, Mayhem Miller, Miz Cracker, India Ferrah, Jujubee, Alexis Mateo, Freddy Scott, Leland	Freddy Scott, Leland	
"Clap Back" (RuPaul featuring the Cast of RuPaul's Drag Race All Stars, Season 5)	2020	Non-album single	Thomas C. Campbell, RuPaul, Shea Couleé, Miz Cracker, Jujubee, Freddy Scott, Leland	Freddy Scott, Leland	
"Eight Days of You" (Miz Cracker featuring Jujubee)	2020	Non-album single	Miz Cracker, Jujubee	Danny Ross	
"Cursed" (Tony Ni featuring Jujubee)	2021	Love Terminator	Lisa Hickox, Megan Dervin-Ackerman, Tony Ni Evans	-	
"Living My Life in London (Cast Version)" (RuPaul featuring the cast of RuPaul's Drag Race UK vs The World)	2022	Non-album single	Janey Jacké, Mo Heart, Jujubee, Blu Hydrangea, Baga Chipz, RuPaul	Jack Wilson, Lior Rosner	
"Cathouse Fever" (Ginger Minj, Jujubee, Peppermint)	2022	Drag: The Musical (Studio Cast Recording)	Alaska Thunderfuck, Ash Gordon, Tomas Costanza	Tomas Costanza	
"Wigs" (Ginger Minj, Jujubee, Peppermint)	2022	Drag: The Musical (Studio Cast Recording)	Alaska Thunderfuck, Ash Gordon, Tomas Costanza	Tomas Costanza	
"She's Such a Bitch" (Alaska Thunderfuck, Divina de Campo, Ginger Minj, Jujubee, Lagoona Bloo, Monét X Change, Nick Adams, Peppermint)	2022	Drag: The Musical (Studio Cast Recording)	Alaska Thunderfuck, Ash Gordon, Tomas Costanza	Tomas Costanza	
"Welcome to the Catfish" (Bob the Drag Queen, Divina de Campo, Ginger Minj, Jujubee, Lagoona Bloo, Peppermint)	2022	Drag: The Musical (Studio Cast Recording)	Alaska Thunderfuck, Ash Gordon, Tomas Costanza	Tomas Costanza	
"Brendan Is His Name" (Jack Rodman, Jujubee, Divina de Campo, Peppermint, Lagoona Bloo, Ginger Minj)	2022	Drag: The Musical (Studio Cast Recording)	Alaska Thunderfuck, Ash Gordon, Tomas Costanza	Tomas Costanza	
"Get It Together" (Alaska Thunderfuck, Divina de Campo, Ginger Minj, Jack Rodman, Jujubee, Lagoona Bloo, Michelle Visage, Monét X Change, Nick Adams, Peppermint)	2022	Drag: The Musical (Studio Cast Recording)	Alaska Thunderfuck, Ash Gordon, Tomas Costanza	Tomas Costanza	
"The Big Opening" (The cast of Huluween Dragstravaganza)	2022	Huluween Dragstravaganza (Original Soundtrack)	Chantry Johnson, Michelle Zarlenga, Noah Davis	Chantry Johnson	
"The Next American Slasher" (Jujubee, Manila Luzon, Mo Heart)	2022	Huluween Dragstravaganza (Original Soundtrack)	Austin Zudeck, Justin Thunstrom, Sofia Quinn, Stewart Taylor	Parkwild	
"It's the End, Girlfriend" (The cast of Huluween Dragstravaganza)	2022	Huluween Dragstravaganza (Original Soundtrack)	Fallon King, Lucky West, Noah Davis, Tony Ferrari	Lucky West	
"Til Death Becomes Us" (Trinity the Tuck featuring Jujubee)	2024	Sinematic	Drew Louis, Jayelle, Coen Hutton	Drew Louis	

=== Other appearances ===
Title	Year	Album
"Santa Claus Is Coming to Town"	2018	Christmas Queens 4

== Filmography ==
=== Film ===
Year	Title	Role	Notes
2026	Stop! That! Train!	DeeDee	

=== Television ===
Year	Title	Role	Notes	Ref
2010–2018	RuPaul's Drag Race	Contestant	Season 2; 12 episodes (3rd place)	
2010–2018	RuPaul's Drag Race	Herself	Guest; Season 10; Episode 1: "10s Across the Board"	
2010	RuPaul's Drag Race: Untucked	Herself	Season 1; 10 episodes	
2010–2012	RuPaul's Drag U	Herself	Mentor ("Drag Professor"); Season 1–3; 11 episodes	
2012–2020	RuPaul's Drag Race All Stars	Contestant	Season 1; 6 episodes (3rd/4th place)	
2012–2020	RuPaul's Drag Race All Stars	Herself	Guest; Season 2; Episode 2: "All Stars Snatch Game"	
2012–2020	RuPaul's Drag Race All Stars	Contestant	Season 5; 8 episodes (Runner-up)	
2012–2020	RuPaul's Drag Race All Stars: Untucked	Herself	Season 1; 6 episodes	
2012–2020	RuPaul's Drag Race All Stars: Untucked	Herself	Season 2; 8 episodes	
2016	Cocktails & Classics	Herself	2 episodes	
2019–2020	Dragnificent!	Herself	Mentor; 7 episodes, formerly known as Drag Me Down the Aisle	
2020	AJ and the Queen	Lee St. Lee	Episode 10: "Dallas"	
2021	Queen of the Universe	Contestant	Season 1; 1 episode (10th-14th place)	
2022	RuPaul's Drag Race: UK vs. the World	Contestant	Series 1; 6 episodes (3rd place)	
2022	RuPaul's Secret Celebrity Drag Race	Herself	"Queen Supreme Mentor"; Season 2, 8 episodes	
2022	Huluween Dragstravaganza	Herself	Hulu original	

- Drag House Rules (2025)

=== Theatre ===
Year	Title	Role	Theatre	Ref(s)
2022	Death Drop	Summer Raines	Criterion Theatre	
2022	Cinderella	Madame	North Shore Music Theatre	
2023	Death Drop: Back in the Habit	Sister Maria Julie Andrews	UK Tour	

=== Music videos ===
Year	Title	Artist
2011	Jealous of My Boogie	RuPaul
2012	Responsitrannity	RuPaul
2012	Queen	Xelle
2018	Call My Life	Blair St. Clair
2024	'Til Death Becomes Us	Trinity the Tuck (feat. Jujubee)

=== Web series ===
Year	Title	Role	Notes	Ref.
2014	Fashion Photo RuView	Herself	Guest Co-Host	
2015	Drag Queens React	Herself	Episode: "Drag Queens Reading Mean Comments"	
2017	Bestie$ for Ca$h	Herself	Guest, with Raven	
2017	The Pandora Boxx Show	Herself	Guest, with Jasmine Masters	
2019	Holiday Showdown	Herself	ExitFour production	
2020	Love Hotline	Herself	Co-Host	
2020	The Pit Stop	Herself	Guest	
2020	Whatcha Packin'	Herself	Guest	
2021	I Like to Watch	Herself	Guest with Katya Zamolodchikova	
2022	Bring Back My Girls	Herself	Guest	
2022	The Walk In	Herself	Guest, Amazon Music pride special	
2022	Tongue Thai'd	Herself	Guest	
2023, 2025	Dimension 20: Dungeons and Drag Queens	Twyla	Main role; 10 episodes	
2023	Dirty Laundry	Herself	Episode: "Who Came Out to Their High School Girlfriend Via Jesus Christ?"	
2024	Drag Me to The Movies	Various	Produced by World of Wonder	
2024	Monét's Slumber Party	Herself	Guest	

=== Podcasting ===
Year	Title	Role	Notes	Ref.
2021	Binge	Herself	Podcast by Entertainment Weekly	
2022	Queen of Hearts	Herself	Main Host	
2022	Hi Jinkx! with Jinkx Monsoon	Herself	Episode: "Jujubee"	
2022	Rich and Daily	Herself	Episode: "Jujubee is Our 'Queen of Hearts'"	
2022	Sydnee in the Sheets	Herself	Episode: "Good Juju"	
2022	Call Me Curious	Herself	Episode: "Are Drag Queens Doing More Than Performing?"	
2023	Add To Cart (with Kulap Vilaysack and SuChin Pak)	Herself	Episode: "Lao Joy with Jujubee"	
2023	Even the Rich	Herself	Episode: "RuPaul: Born Naked - That’s a Slay! with Jujubee & Mo Heart"	
2023	And That's What You REALLY Missed	Herself	Episode: "The Secret’s Out"	

== Awards and nominations ==
Year	Award	Category	Work	Result	Ref.
2010	New Now Next Awards	Most Addicting Reality Star	Herself	Nominated	
2022	Queerty Award	Drag Royalty	Herself	Nominated	
2025	Queerty Awards	Web Series	Dungeons and Drag Queens	Won	
2025	Lucille Lortel Award	Outstanding Featured Performer in a Musical	Drag: The Musical	Nominated	
