= All Star Variety Extravaganza =

All Star Variety Extravaganza may refer to:

- All Star Variety Extravaganza (RuPaul's Drag Race All Stars season 5)
- All Star Variety Extravaganza (RuPaul's Drag Race All Stars season 6)
