= Thom Filicia =

American interior designer

- Born: Syracuse, New York, U.S
- Education: Syracuse University (BFA)
- Occupations: TV host, interior designer
- Website: www.thomfilicia.com

Thom Filicia is an American interior designer, known for his role as an interior design expert on the television program Queer Eye for the Straight Guy. He is also a co-author of a book based on the show.

== Biography ==
Filicia grew up in the greater Syracuse area, and graduated from Nottingham High School in Syracuse, New York. Filicia graduated from Syracuse University's College of Visual and Performing Arts with a Bachelor of Fine Arts in interior design.

Filicia began his career at renowned design firms Parish-Hadley, Robert Metzger, and Bilhuber & Associates. He is the founder and chief creative officer of New York City-based design firm, Thom Filicia, Inc., founded in 1998. Filicia's design portfolio includes various projects such as the VIP Suite for the USA Pavilion at the World's Fair in Aichi, Japan, an eco-friendly apartment for Riverhouse, Manhattan's first premium (LEED certified) "green" luxury condominium tower, and designing the holiday decoration installation with American Christmas for the Radio City Music Hall.

Filicia got cast as the interior design expert in the Emmy Award-winning show Queer Eye for the Straight Guy. Filicia has also hosted several shows for the Style Network, including Dress My Nest and Tacky House.

He was a guest judge on HGTV's The White Room Challenge.

He collaborated with Chicago-based designers Eastern Accents over a five-year period on a line of bedding products that were ultimately released in 2020 under the Thom Filicia Home Collection label.

In 2022, he was a contestant on the second season of RuPaul’s Secret Celebrity Drag Race as Drag Queen "Jackie Would" and made it through 3 weeks before being eliminated in a lip sync to Donna Bellissima.

In 2023, Filicia was a guest celebrity judge and performed Jackie Would in the episode of the eighth season titled Carson Kressley, This Is Your Gay Life of the American reality television series RuPaul's Drag Race All Stars aired on Paramount+ and WOW Presents Plus.

== Books ==
Filicia is the author of Thom Filicia Style published in 2008 by Atria/Simon & Schuster, and is a contributing author of Queer Eye For The Straight Guy: The Fab 5 Guide To Living Better. His American Beauty: Renovating and Decorating a Beloved Retreat was published in 2012 by Clarkson Potter Publishers.

== Awards ==
- Queer Eye won an Emmy in 2004 for Outstanding Reality Program, and received a nomination again in the same category in 2005.
- In 2011 he was named as one of Elle Decor's top 25 A-List Designers, in 2006 he was chosen as one of House Beautiful's Top 100 American Designers and House & Garden's Top 50 "Tastemakers".
