= Snatch Game of Love =

Snatch Game of Love may refer to:

- "Snatch Game of Love" (RuPaul's Drag Race All Stars season 4), 2018 American television episode
- "Snatch Game of Love" (RuPaul's Drag Race All Stars season 5), 2020 American television episode
