= Mayhem Miller =

Mayhem Miller may refer to:

- Jason Miller (fighter)
- Mayhem Miller (drag queen)
