= AJ and the Queen =

2020 American comedy television series

- Promotional poster for the series.
- Genre: Comedy drama
- Created by: RuPaul Charles; Michael Patrick King
- Starring: RuPaul Charles; Izzy G.; Michael-Leon Wooley; Josh Segarra; Katerina Tannenbaum; Tia Carrere
- Composer: Lior Rosner
- Country of origin: United States
- Original language: English
- No. of seasons: 1
- No. of episodes: 10

Production
- Executive producers: RuPaul Charles; Michael Patrick King
- Running time: 47–59 minutes
- Production companies: MPK Productions; RuCo; Warner Bros. Television

Original release
- Network: Netflix
- Release: January 10, 2020

AJ and the Queen is an American comedy-drama television series, created by RuPaul and Michael Patrick King. It premiered on Netflix on January 10, 2020.

== Premise ==
AJ and the Queen follows "Ruby Red, a bigger-than-life but down-on-her-luck drag queen who travels across America from club to club in a rundown 1986 R/V with her unlikely sidekick AJ, a recently orphaned, tough-talking, scrappy ten-year-old stowaway. As the two misfits travel from city to city, Ruby's message of love and acceptance winds up touching people and changing their lives for the better."

== Cast and characters ==
=== Main ===
- RuPaul Charles as Robert Lincoln Lee/Ruby Red
- Izzy G. as Amber Jasmine "AJ" Douglas
- Michael-Leon Wooley as Louis Bell/Cocoa Butter
- Josh Segarra as Hector Ramirez/Damien Sanchez
- Katerina Tannenbaum as Brianna Douglas, AJ's mother
- Tia Carrere as Leilani Kala'i/Lady Danger

=== Recurring ===
- Matthew Wilkas as Officer Patrick Kennedy

=== Guest ===
- Victoria "Porkchop" Parker as herself
- Jinkx Monsoon as Edie
- Katya Zamolodchikova as Magda
- Mario Cantone as Alma Joy
- Marc Singer as Bob
- Adrienne Barbeau as Helen
- Michael Cyril Creighton as Christian
- Chad Michaels as Brian Gerrity
- Tim Bagley as Lloyd Johnson
- Laura Bell Bundy as Bernadette Anderson
- Bridget Everett as Anna
- Natasha Leggero as Kath
- Jimmy Ray Bennett as Kevin
- Latrice Royale as Fabergé Legs
- Monique Heart as Miss Terri Tory
- Kevin Daniels as Darrell
- John Rubinstein as Doctor
- Mary Kay Place as Carolanne
- Jane Krakowski as Beth Barnes Beagle
- Ginger Minj as Tommy/Fanny Pack
- Trinity The Tuck as Danielle Dupri
- Jujubee as Lee Saint Lee
- Patrick Bristow as Kevin Prescott
- Lorraine Bracco as herself

Additionally, former RuPaul's Drag Race contestants Mayhem Miller, Valentina, Eureka O'Hara, Bianca Del Rio, Alexis Mateo, Manila Luzon, Vanessa Vanjie Mateo, Jaymes Mansfield, Ongina, Kennedy Davenport, Mariah Balenciaga, Dahlia Sin, Jade Jolie, Monica Beverly Hillz, Morgan McMichaels and Pandora Boxx make cameos, appearing as unnamed queens.

== Production ==
In May 2018, it was announced that Netflix had given the production a series order for a first season consisting of ten episodes, with RuPaul starring. The series is created, written, and executive produced by RuPaul and Michael Patrick King. MPK Productions and Warner Bros. Television are involved in producing the series. In July 2018, a casting breakdown released to talent agencies was published online. It revealed the names of four new characters, Louis, Hector/Damian Sanchez, Lady Danger, and Brianna, and included character descriptions as well.

In September 2018, it was announced that Josh Segarra, Michael-Leon Wooley, Katerina Tannenbaum, and Tia Carrere had been cast in starring roles. On October 16, 2018, it was reported that Izzy G. had been cast in the lead role of the titular AJ. In January 2019, it was announced that Matthew Wilkas had joined the cast in a recurring capacity.

On March 6, 2020, Netflix announced that the series had been cancelled after one season.

== Episodes ==
No.	Title	Directed by	Written by	Original release date
1	"New York City"	Michael Patrick King	RuPaul Charles & Michael Patrick King	January 10, 2020
Ruby is set to retire from touring as a drag queen, by using her $100,000 life savings as initial payment on a downtown New York City drag nightclub. Her credit card is rejected because Damien, her love interest/business partner has apparently scammed her, forcing her to go back on the road. Sneaking aboard Ruby's mini-RV is a neighbor's child, AJ, who has been all but abandoned by her drug-taking prostitute mother; they were evicted so AJ needed a place to sleep.
2	"Pittsburgh"	Michael Patrick King	RuPaul Charles & Michael Patrick King	January 10, 2020
Ruby and AJ head to Pittsburgh for a show. Ruby finds out AJ is actually a girl, and that AJ is short for Amber Jasmine. AJ's phone gets left behind at a diner on the interstate, but Ruby is on good terms with the waitress, and arranges to pick it up on the way back. Later, Ruby goes through AJ's backpack looking for his own phone and discovers a Jasmine doll. AJ said she doesn't want to be a girl, because nobody bothers boys. Ruby's former boyfriend Damien and his partner in crime find out that Ruby reported the theft, and they follow Ruby and AJ to Pittsburgh. Ruby and AJ take off to Ruby's next gig.
3	"Columbus"	Bobcat Goldthwait	Jhoni Marchinko	January 10, 2020
Ruby and AJ have a minor accident on their way out of the parking lot as they head out to Columbus. A cop pulls them over for a broken tail light and they discover they're still being followed, so they detour on a back road and stop along the way to get the tail light fixed. AJ's mother got arrested and leaves a message on AJ's phone. AJ later calls her back and leaves a message but by that time her mother has lost her phone. Ruby enters a wet T-shirt contest and wins enough money to pay for the RV repairs. At the show in Columbus, Ruby sees Damien in the audience, so her and AJ flee in the RV.
4	"Louisville"	Adam Davidson	RuPaul Charles & Michael Patrick King	January 10, 2020
AJ's mother wants to call her but has no money to buy a new phone. She finally gets a phone, but AJ doesn't pick up when she calls her. The drag queens at the Louisville club are not happy to see Ruby. Later, Damien phones Ruby with a fake attempt to make it up to her. AJ wants Ruby to put out the word to other queens not to get taken in by Damien, but she refuses, so AJ posts about it on social media. It turns out Damien grifted Ruby's friend Brian and other queens.
5	"Mt. Juliet"	Michael Patrick King	Eric Reyes Loo	January 10, 2020
Heading towards Nashville, Tennessee Ruby and AJ discuss LGBTQ icons, which leads to finding out legendary dress designer Bob Mackie, known for campy outfits, has a namesake museum in Mt. Juliet—only six hours out of their way.
6	"Little Rock"	Adam Shankman	Stephen Soroka	January 10, 2020
AJ And Ruby pull into a Little Rock, Arkansas parking campsite for RVers for a few days' stay, one of the nearby neighbors has a near-identical RV which Ruby mistakenly enters after using the shower. The next day AJ gets busy digging for diamonds in a "diamond" field, while Ruby is befriended by three campsite regulars who want help putting on an informal show of Grease songs. Meanwhile, Damien and Lady Danger tracked down Ruby and try to kill her by planting a rattlesnake in the RV, which she escapes. On show day, Ruby plans to surprise the campsite regulars with AJ (as Grease's Sandy), and her counterpart Brick, a neighbor boy, dressed as Danny, to jump into the "Born to Hand Jive"/"You're the One That I Want" performance. But Brick had the idea to switch roles with AJ, upsetting his dad at the cross-dressing.
7	"Jackson"	Anne Fletcher	Drew Droege	January 10, 2020
Ruby and AJ make their way to Mississippi for an action packed reunion. Back in New York, Louis opens the door to an unexpected visitor.
8	"Baton Rouge"	Michael Spiller	Tracy Poust & Jon Kinnally	January 10, 2020
A Medical emergency triggers a string of painful memories for AJ and Ruby. Lady Danger and Damien cross paths with a fellow traveler.
9	"Fort Worth"	Dennie Gordon	Michael Patrick King & Jhoni Marchinko	January 10, 2020
As the RV rolls into Texas, the tour hits an unforeseen snag. Ruby visits an old friend and AJ eagerly awaits life with Pop Pop.
10	"Dallas"	Michael Patrick King	RuPaul Charles & Michael Patrick King	January 10, 2020
The end of tour arrives as Ruby competes in Miss Drag USA, AJ prepares for Pop Pop's farm, and Brianna attempts one last desperate leap of faith.

== Soundtrack ==
AJ and the Queen (Original Television Soundtrack)

Soundtrack album by Lior Rosner and RuPaul
- Released: January 24, 2020
- Length: 32:44
- Label: WaterTower

On January 24, 2020 a 16 track soundtrack album titled AJ and the Queen (Official Television Soundtrack) was released by Warner Bros. Entertainment. It was created by Lior Rosner and RuPaul.

AJ and the Queen (Official Television Soundtrack)
No.	Title	Artist	Length
1.	"Ruby Is Red Hot (From AJ and the Queen)"	RuPaul	2:43
2.	"Walk It Off (I'm on My Way)"	RuPaul	3:11
3.	"Ruby Is Red Hot (Retro Remix)"	RuPaul	2:30
4.	"Ruby Is Red Hot (Kummerspeck Remix)"	RuPaul	2:29
5.	"Ruby Is Red Hot (Lush Remix)"	RuPaul	2:16
6.	"In the Beginning"	Lior Rosner	1:13
7.	"AJ's Theme"	Lior Rosner	3:15
8.	"Lady Danger"	Lior Rosner	3:08
9.	"Mount Juliet"	Lior Rosner	1:04
10.	"AJ Bribes the Drag Fans"	Lior Rosner	0:49
11.	"Danielle Plans Some Trouble"	Lior Rosner	1:11
12.	"Lady Danger Breaking and Entering"	Lior Rosner	0:51
13.	"Queens to the Rescue"	Lior Rosner	0:48
14.	"Damian Visits Robert"	Lior Rosner	1:59
15.	"AJ Drop Off and Goodbye"	Lior Rosner	2:14
16.	"The End"	Lior Rosner	3:03
Total length:			32:44

== Reception ==
On Rotten Tomatoes, the series holds an approval rating of 52% based on 21 reviews, with an average rating of 5.39/10. The site's critical consensus reads: "Though it doesn't always come together, AJ and the Queen is a sweet, sometimes off-the wall adventure that's fun to watch even when it's fumbling." On Metacritic, the series has a weighted average score of 46 out of 100, based on 8 critics, indicating "mixed or average reviews".
