= RuPaul's Secret Celebrity Drag Race season 2 =

2022 season of the television series

RuPaul's Secret Celebrity Drag Race
- Season 2
- Promotional poster for season two
- Hosted by: RuPaul
- Judges: RuPaul; Michelle Visage; Carson Kressley; Ross Mathews
- No. of contestants: 9
- Winners: Poppy Love (AJ McLean)
- Runners-up: Chakra 7 (Tatyana Ali); Thirsty von Trap (Mark Indelicato)
- No. of episodes: 8

Release
- Original network: VH1
- Original release: August 12 – September 30, 2022

Season chronology
- ← Previous; Season 1

The second season of RuPaul's Secret Celebrity Drag Race premiered August 12, 2022 on VH1. This season featured a major retool of the spin-off, with nine celebrity contestants — concealed by drag personas — competing in a season-length lip sync tournament. RuPaul, Michelle Visage, Carson Kressley and Ross Mathews returned as judges.

The season was won by Backstreet Boys member AJ McLean (as "Poppy Love"), with Tatyana Ali ("Chakra 7") and Mark Indelicato ("Thirsty von Trap") as runners-up, and Ali being voted as Miss Congeniality by the contestants.

== Background ==
Unlike the first season, which featured self-contained competitions based on the format of the main series, season 2 of Secret Celebrity Drag Race featured a season-length lip-sync competition with celebrities concealed via drag personas (a la The Masked Singer), with the champion receiving $100,000 for a charity of their choice. In each episode, the queens each gave a lip sync performance for the judges and a studio audience. The bottom two queens competed in a Lip Sync for Your Life for a chance to be saved from elimination; the eliminated queen would then reveal their true identity at the end of the show. All remaining queens revealed their identity at the beginning of the sixth episode.

Brooke Lynn Hytes, Jujubee and Monét X Change served as the "Queen Supremes", providing commentary for the series as well as assisting and mentoring the contestants. There were also special appearances by Eureka, Gottmik, Katya, Morgan McMichaels, Silky Nutmeg Ganache and Violet Chachki.

== Contestants ==
Contestants of RuPaul's Secret Celebrity Drag Race season 2 and their charity donations
Drag Name	Celebrity	Queen Supreme	Outcome	Raised	Charity
Poppy Love	AJ McLean	Jujubee	Winner	$100,000	Trans Lifeline
Chakra 7	Tatyana Ali	Brooke Lynn Hytes	Runners-up (Note: Chakra 7 was voted Miss Congeniality by their fellow contestants.)	$5,000	Hansavedas
Thirsty von Trap	Mark Indelicato	Monét X Change	Runners-up	$5,000	Planned Parenthood
Chic-Li-Fay	Kevin McHale	Brooke Lynn Hytes	4th place	$5,000	Lions Camp Tatiyee
Donna Bellissima	Daniel Franzese	Monét X Change	5th place	$5,000	The Trevor Project
Milli von Sunshine	Jenna Ushkowitz	Jujubee	6th place	$5,000	Planned Parenthood
Jackie Would	Thom Filicia	Jujubee	7th place	$5,000	Bone Marrow & Cancer Foundation
Electra Owl	Taylor Dayne	Brooke Lynn Hytes	8th place	$5,000	Global Green
Fabulosity	Loretta Devine	Monét X Change	9th place	$5,000	NAACP Legal Defense and Educational Fund

== Contestant progress ==
Legend:

Poppy Love won RuPaul's Secret Celebrity Drag Race season 2.
Chakra 7 and Thirsty von Trap were the runners-up.
Chakra 7 was voted Miss Congeniality (Miss C) by fellow contestants.
WIN indicates that the contestant won the challenge.
TOP2 indicates that the contestant was one of the two best performing in the challenge, but lost the lip sync to win it.
SAFE indicates that the contestant was declared safe by the judges.
BTM (Bottom) indicates that the contestant was up for elimination.
ELIM (Eliminated) indicates that the contestant was eliminated.
Guest indicates that the contestant returned as a guest.

Contestants progress with placements in each episode
Drag Name	Celebrity	Episode								
Drag Name	Celebrity	1	2	3	4	5	6	7	8	
Poppy Love	AJ McLean	WIN	WIN	SAFE	SAFE	SAFE	SAFE	BTM	Winner	
Chakra 7	Tatyana Ali	SAFE	SAFE	WIN	SAFE	TOP2	WIN	SAFE	Miss C	R-up
Thirsty von Trap	Mark Indelicato	SAFE	BTM	SAFE	BTM	SAFE	BTM	WIN	Runner-up	
Chic-Li-Fay	Kevin McHale	SAFE	SAFE	WIN	WIN	SAFE	SAFE	ELIM	Guest	
Donna Bellissima	Daniel Franzese	SAFE	SAFE	BTM	SAFE	WIN	ELIM		Guest	
Milli von Sunshine	Jenna Ushkowitz	SAFE	SAFE	SAFE	ELIM				Guest	
Jackie Would	Thom Filicia	BTM	SAFE	ELIM					Guest	
Electra Owl	Taylor Dayne	SAFE	ELIM						Guest	
Fabulosity	Loretta Devine	ELIM							Guest	

== Lip syncs ==
Legend:

The contestant won the Lip Sync for the Crown and was declared the winner of the season.
The contestant won the lip sync to win the challenge.
The contestant was eliminated after their first time in the bottom.
The contestant was eliminated after their second time in the bottom.

Episode	Contestants			Song	Eliminated
1	Fabulosity	vs.	Jackie Would	"Venus" (Bananarama)	Fabulosity
2	Electra Owl	vs.	Thirsty von Trap	"Shut Up and Drive" (Rihanna)	Electra Owl
3	Donna Bellissima	vs.	Jackie Would	"Ain't Nothin' Goin' On but the Rent" (Gwen Guthrie)	Jackie Would
4	Milli von Sunshine	vs.	Thirsty von Trap	"My Life Would Suck Without You" (Kelly Clarkson)	Milli von Sunshine
Episode	Contestants			Song	Winner
5	Chakra 7	vs.	Donna Bellissima	"Believe" (Cher)	Donna Bellissima
Episode	Contestants			Song	Eliminated
6	Donna Bellissima	vs.	Thirsty von Trap	"U Wear It Well" (RuPaul)	Donna Bellissima
7	Chic-Li-Fay	vs.	Poppy Love	"The Edge of Glory" (Lady Gaga)	Chic-Li-Fay
Episode	Contestants			Song	Winner
8	Chakra 7 vs. Poppy Love vs. Thirsty von Trap			"I'm So Excited" (The Pointer Sisters)	Poppy Love

== Episodes ==
=== Episode 1: I'm Coming Out - First Time in Drag! (August 12) ===
Performances in order of appearance on the first episode
Contestant	Song	Result
Poppy Love	"You Oughta Know" (Alanis Morissette)	Winner
Chakra 7	"I'm Every Woman" (Chaka Khan)	Safe
Donna Belissima	"Super Bass" (Nicki Minaj)	Safe
Milli von Sunshine	"Sweet but Psycho" (Ava Max)	Safe
Jackie Would	"Juice" (Lizzo)	Bottom
Electra Owl	"Raise Your Glass" (P!nk)	Safe
Thirsty von Trap	"Don't Cha" (The Pussycat Dolls ft. Busta Rhymes)	Safe
Fabulosity	"Just Fine" (Mary J. Blige)	Eliminated
Chic-Li-Fay	"Goodies" (Ciara ft. Petey Pablo)	Safe

=== Episode 2: Dance Your Padded Ass Off! (August 19) ===
Performances in order of appearance on the second episode
Contestant	Song	Result
Chic-Li-Fay	"On the Floor" (Jennifer Lopez ft. Pitbull)	Safe
Electra Owl	"Last Dance" (Donna Summer)	Eliminated
Thirsty von Trap	"Physical" (Dua Lipa)	Bottom
Milli von Sunshine	"Dancing On My Own" (Robyn)	Safe
Jackie Would	"Pump Up the Jam" (Technotronic)	Safe
Chakra 7	"I Wanna Dance with Somebody (Who Loves Me)" (Whitney Houston)	Safe
Donna Belissima	"Mambo Italiano" (Rosemary Clooney)	Safe
Poppy Love	"Show Me How You Burlesque" (Christina Aguilera)	Winner

=== Episode 3: Money, Honey (August 26) ===
Performances in order of appearance on the third episode
Contestant	Song	Result
Poppy Love	"9 to 5" (Dolly Parton)	Safe
Milli von Sunshine	"Work from Home" (Fifth Harmony ft. Ty Dolla Sign)	Safe
Chic-Li-Fay	"Bitch Better Have My Money" (Rihanna)	Winner
Jackie Would	"Work Bitch" (Britney Spears)	Eliminated
Donna Belissima	"I Don't Want It at All" (Kim Petras)	Bottom
Thirsty von Trap	"7 Rings" (Ariana Grande)	Safe
Chakra 7	"M.I.L.F. $" (Fergie)	Winner

=== Episode 4: Drag Duets (September 2) ===
The remaining queens were paired with Eureka!, Gottmik, Katya, Morgan McMichaels, Silky Nutmeg Ganache and Violet Chachki.

Performances in order of appearance on the fourth episode
Contestant	Drag partner	Song	Result
Donna Belissima	Silky Nutmeg Ganache	"Whatta Man" (Salt-N-Pepa, En Vogue)	Safe
Chakra 7	Eureka! (Note: Eureka O'Hara is referred to as Eureka! on the show.)	"Fly" (Nicki Minaj ft. Rihanna)	Safe
Thirsty von Trap	Katya (Note: Yekaterina Petrovna Zamolodchikova is referred to as Katya on the show.)	"Let Me Blow Ya Mind" (Eve ft. Gwen Stefani)	Bottom
Poppy Love	Morgan McMichaels	"The Boy Is Mine" (Brandy, Monica)	Safe
Milli von Sunshine	Gottmik	"Side to Side" (Ariana Grande ft. Nicki Minaj)	Eliminated
Chic-Li-Fay	Violet Chachki	"When You Believe" (Mariah Carey, Whitney Houston)	Winner

=== Episode 5: I Love the 90s (September 9) ===
Performances in order of appearance on the fifth episode
Contestant	Song	Result
Poppy Love	"Wannabe" (Spice Girls)	Safe
Donna Belissima	"Sin Wagon" (The Chicks)	Winner
Chakra 7	"Doo Wop (That Thing)" (Lauryn Hill)	Top 2
Chic-Li-Fay	"Genie in a Bottle" (Christina Aguilera)	Safe
Thirsty von Trap	"(You Drive Me) Crazy" (Britney Spears)	Safe

=== Episode 6: RuPaul-A-Palooza! (September 16) ===
Performances in order of appearance on the sixth episode
Contestant	Song	Result
Group Number	"I Made It" (RuPaul's Drag Race Live!)	
Thirsty von Trap	"Sissy That Walk" (RuPaul)	Bottom
Chakra 7	"Cha Cha Bitch" (RuPaul ft. AB Soto)	Winner
Chic-Li-Fay	"Peanut Butter" (RuPaul ft. Big Freedia)	Safe
Poppy Love	"Devil Made Me Do It" (RuPaul)	Safe
Donna Belissima	"Born Naked" (RuPaul ft. Clairy Browne)	Eliminated

=== Episode 7: Yaaas Gaga (September 23) ===
Performances in order of appearance on the seventh episode
Contestant	Song	Result
Snatch Game Impersonations	Chakra 7 as Eartha Kitt; Chic-Li-Fay as Céline Dion; Poppy Love as David Bowie, played as Ziggy Stardust; Thirsty von Trap as Erika Jayne	—N/a
Chic-Li-Fay	"Yoü and I" (Lady Gaga)	Eliminated
Thirsty von Trap	"Bad Romance" (Lady Gaga)	Winner
Chakra 7	"Paparazzi" (Lady Gaga)	Safe
Poppy Love	"Born This Way" (Lady Gaga)	Bottom

=== Episode 8: Grande Finale (September 30) ===
Performances in order of appearance on the eighth episode
Contestant	Song	Result
Chakra 7	"Better Be Good to Me" (Tina Turner)	Runner-up
Poppy Love	"I Touch Myself" (Divinyls)	Winner
Thirsty von Trap	"Hollaback Girl" (Gwen Stefani)	Runner-up

The three Queen Supremes Brooke Lynn Hytes, Jujubee and Monét X Change performed together RuPaul's "Blame It on the Edit".
