= Miz Cracker =

American drag queen

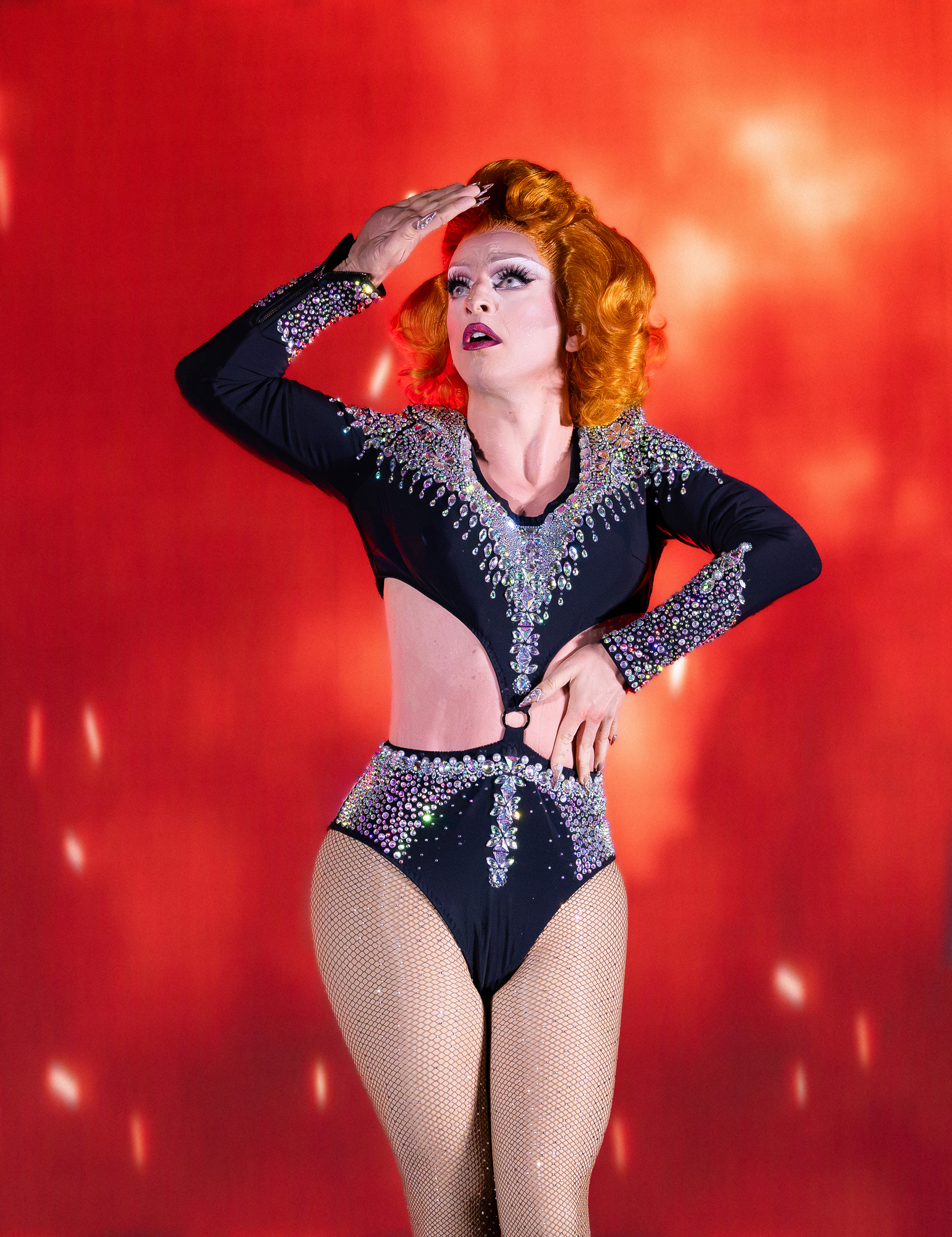
- Miz Cracker performing in 2026
- Born: Maxwell Elias Heller; April 19, 1984 (age 42); Seattle, Washington, U.S.
- Education: Evergreen State College (BA)
- Occupation: Drag queen
- Years active: 2010–present
- Known for: RuPaul's Drag Race (season 10) contestant; RuPaul's Drag Race All Stars (season 5) runner-up

Miz Cracker (born April 19, 1984) is the stage name of Maxwell Elias Heller, an American drag queen and television personality. He is best known for placing fifth on the tenth season of RuPaul's Drag Race and for being a runner-up on the fifth season of RuPaul's Drag Race All Stars.

== Early life ==
Maxwell Heller was born in Seattle. His parents were former members of the Lubavitch community. He also has a sister, Sylvia. Heller left Seattle at eighteen years old. He attended The Evergreen State College, designing his own major.

== Career ==
Heller started his career as Brianna Cracker, but, when another performer took the name, he donned the name "Miss Cracker". However, when trying to make a Facebook account with that name, it denied "Miss" as an appropriate first name, so Heller changed it to "Miz".

Miz Cracker was announced as one of fourteen contestants competing on the tenth season of RuPaul's Drag Race on February 22, 2018. She won the episode ten main challenge after doing a makeover on Chester See. She was eliminated an episode later after losing a lip sync to "Nasty Girl" by Vanity 6 to eventual runner-up Kameron Michaels.

She has a homemade web series, Review with a Jew, where she recaps episodes of Drag Race, starting from All Stars season three. The series debuted on January 31, 2018. Alexandra Pucciarelli from Alma wrote the series is "always hilarious."

Miz Cracker was in the Billboard web series "Spillin' the Tea" on June 13, 2018. She was introduced as the host of her own WoWpresents web series, "JewTorials" on June 26, 2018.

Miz Cracker has written regularly for Slate since 2014, and in 2016, she received the National Lesbian and Gay Journalists Association's Excellence in Column Writing award. Miz Cracker was nominated with Aquaria for the "Competition Contestant of 2018" for the 2018 People's Choice Awards.

In early 2019, she finished her one-woman show called "It's Time", which she performed across the UK. Billboard stated, "The show touched on her struggle with addiction during her early 20s, with a little bit of "Cracker-brand" comedy sprinkled in." Miz Cracker was added to the Drag Race "Haters Roast: The Shady Tour" comedy tour with other alumnae in 2019.

On May 8, 2020, Miz Cracker was announced as one of ten drag queens who would compete in the fifth season of RuPaul's Drag Race All Stars. She won three main challenges, on episodes 4, 6 and 7, and was in the bottom for the snatch game on episode 5. She placed as a runner-up, together with Jujubee.

In 2020, Miz Cracker launched a podcast titled She's a Woman with Studio71.

=== Music ===
Miz Cracker worked with Alexis Michelle, Lady Sinagaga, and Sherry Vine to create "Jappy", a parody of Pharrell Williams' "Happy".

== Personal life ==
Heller is Jewish and lives in Harlem, Manhattan.

== Discography ==
=== Singles ===
==== As lead artist ====
Title	Year	Album
"She's a Woman! (On Top of the World)"	2020	Non-album singles
"Eight Days of You" (featuring Jujubee)	2020	Non-album singles

==== As featured artist ====
Title	Year	Album
"Cher: The Unauthorized Rusical" (RuPaul featuring the Cast of RuPaul's Drag Race, Season 10)	2018	Non-album single
"Alter (Sh)Ego" (Chem Users featuring Miz Cracker)	2018	Pride in Ourselves
"I'm in Love" (with the Cast of RuPaul's Drag Race All Stars, Season 5)	2020	Non-album single
"Clap Back" (RuPaul featuring the Cast of RuPaul's Drag Race All Stars, Season 5)	2020	Non-album single

== Filmography ==
=== Television ===
Year	Title	Role	Notes
2018	RuPaul's Drag Race (season 10)	Herself	Contestant (fifth place)
2018	RuPaul's Drag Race: Untucked (season 10)	Herself	
2020	RuPaul's Drag Race All Stars (season 5)	Herself	Contestant (runner-up)
2020	RuPaul's Drag Race All Stars: Untucked (season 2)	Herself	
2022	Miz Cracker: Here I Stand	Herself	

=== Web series ===
Year	Title	Role	Notes
2018	Review with a Jew	Herself	Hostess
2018	Spillin' the Tea	Herself	
2018	Bon Appétit	Herself	
2018	JewTorials	Herself	Hostess
2019	Cosmo Queens	Herself	

== See also ==
- Drag culture in New York City
- LGBTQ culture in New York City
- List of LGBTQ Jews
- List of LGBTQ people from New York City
- List of people from Harlem
