= Ongina =

Filipino-American drag queen and HIV activist

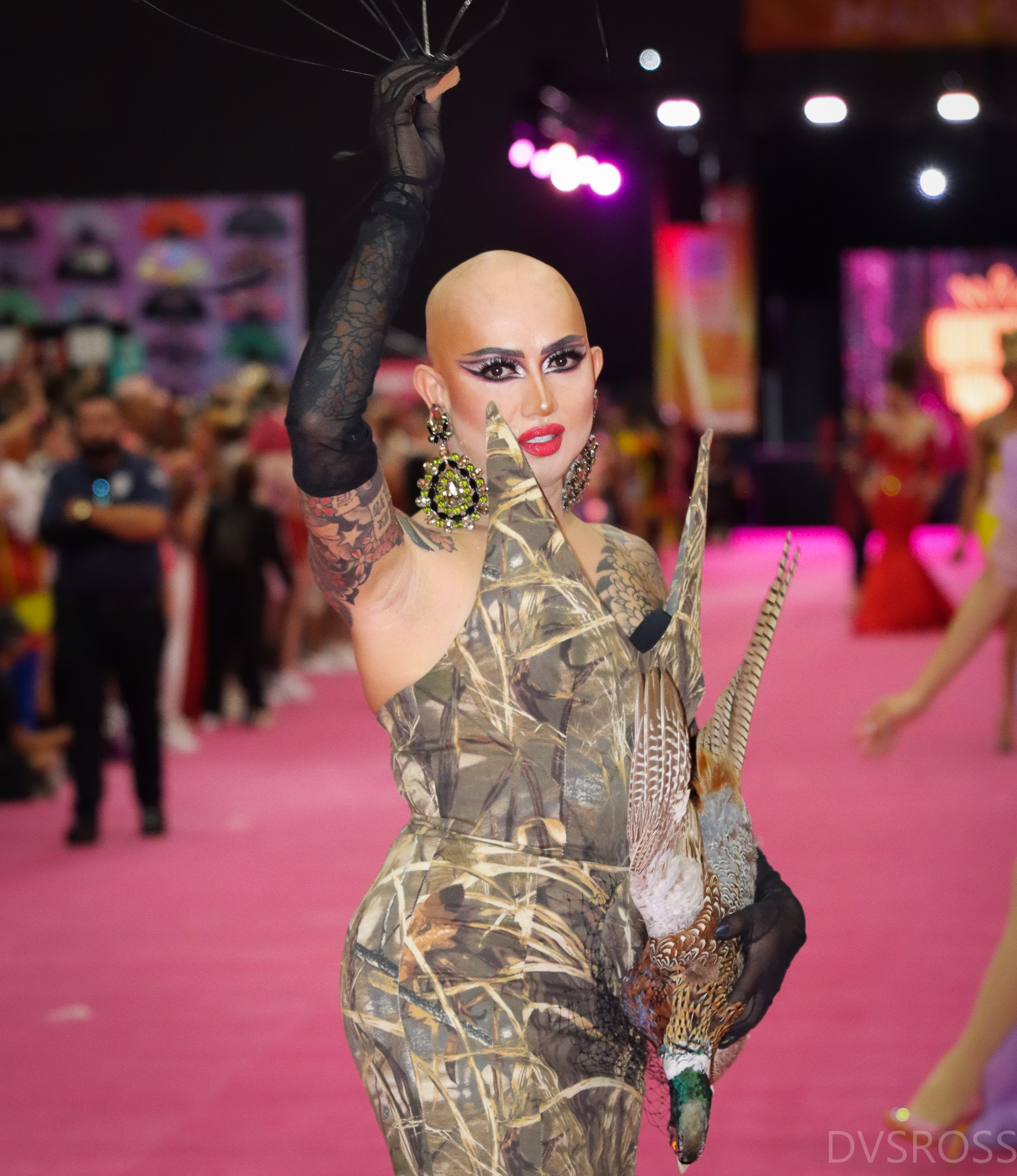
- Ongina at RuPaul's DragCon LA, 2024
- Born: Ryan Ong Palao; January 6, 1982 (age 44); Siasi, Sulu, Philippines
- Other name: Peck-Peck Galore
- Occupation: Drag performer
- Years active: 2001–present
- Known for: RuPaul's Drag Race (season 1); RuPaul's Drag Race All Stars (season 5)

Ongina is the stage name of Ryan Ong Palao (born January 6, 1982), a Filipino-American drag performer and HIV activist who came to international attention on the first season of RuPaul's Drag Race and the fifth season of RuPaul's Drag Race All Stars. Since appearing on the show, Ongina has been featured in a number of web series produced by World of Wonder, including Wait, What?, Ring My Bell, and Fashion Photo RuView. Ongina was one of the first reality TV stars to come out as HIV-positive.

== Early life ==
Palao was born in the Philippines in 1982. He and his family relocated to Lynnwood, Washington in 1994. His original drag name, before Ongina, was Peck-Peck Galore. He started performing in drag in 2003 at an Asian restaurant called Lucky Cheng's, located in the Hell's Kitchen neighborhood in Manhattan, New York, where he worked alongside Laverne Cox. One of the first songs he performed was “Listen” by Beyoncé.

== Drag Race and career ==
Ongina was selected as one of nine contestants for the inaugural season of RuPaul's Drag Race and was officially announced on February 2, 2009. She revealed her HIV status in the fourth episode, where she won her second challenge. She was eliminated in the next episode after losing a lip sync to "Stronger", by Britney Spears, against eventual winner BeBe Zahara Benet, placing her in fifth.

Outside of season 1, she made a cameo appearance on the first season of RuPaul's Drag Race All Stars. She also made five appearances in the first and second seasons of RuPaul's Drag U. In November 2017, Ongina was a featured performer in Queens United, a benefit show created by Jaremi Carey in an effort to raise money to people affected by Hurricane Maria.

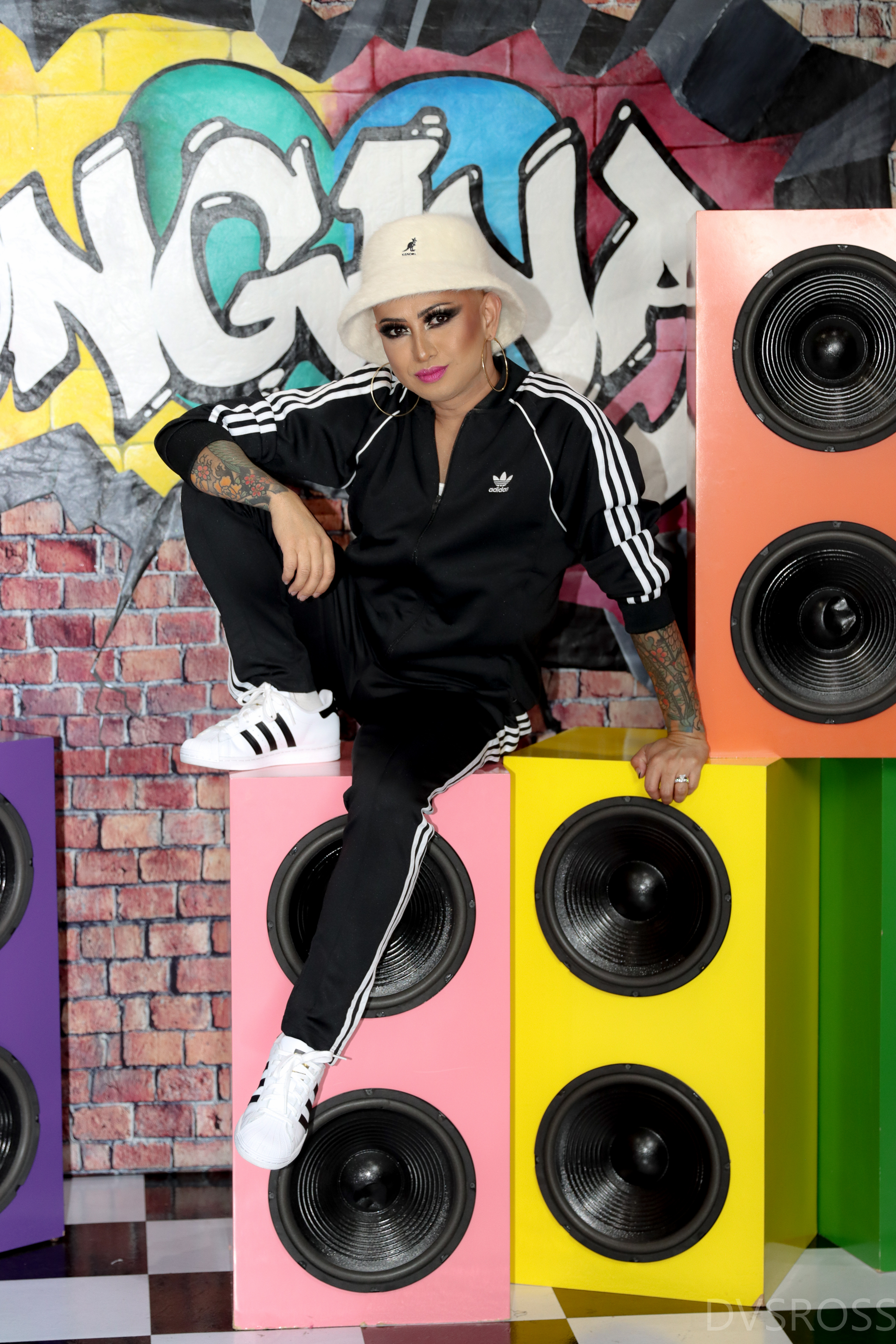
Ongina at RuPaul's DragCon LA in 2023

Ongina appeared as a guest for the first challenge in the premiere of season 11 of Drag Race.

Ongina was in the 2009 music video for "I Gotta Feeling" by The Black Eyed Peas. An animated version of her appeared in the RuPaul's Drag Race: Dragopolis 2.0 mobile app. She appeared in three episodes of the WOW Presents web series Fashion Photo RuView with Mayhem Miller, filling in for Raja and Raven in September and October 2018. She was a backup dancer for Nico Tortorella on an episode of Lip Sync Battle in 2019.

In June 2019, Ongina performed at Motor City Pride. Later that year, she performed at Virginia Pridefest, headlined by Betty Who. Later that year, she starred in Tammie Brown Walking Ongina in Nature!, a "two-woman show", alongside fellow Drag Race alum Tammie Brown, in reference to Tammie's quote: “I don’t see you walking children in nature” from the Drag Race Season 1 reunion.

On May 8, 2020, Ongina was announced as one of the ten queens competing on the fifth season of RuPaul's Drag Race All Stars. She was the second queen eliminated from the show, ultimately placing 9th.

In November 2020, Ongina hosted "Constellations of Change", a live-streamed cabaret show produced by ViiV Healthcare as a part of its annual Community Summit.

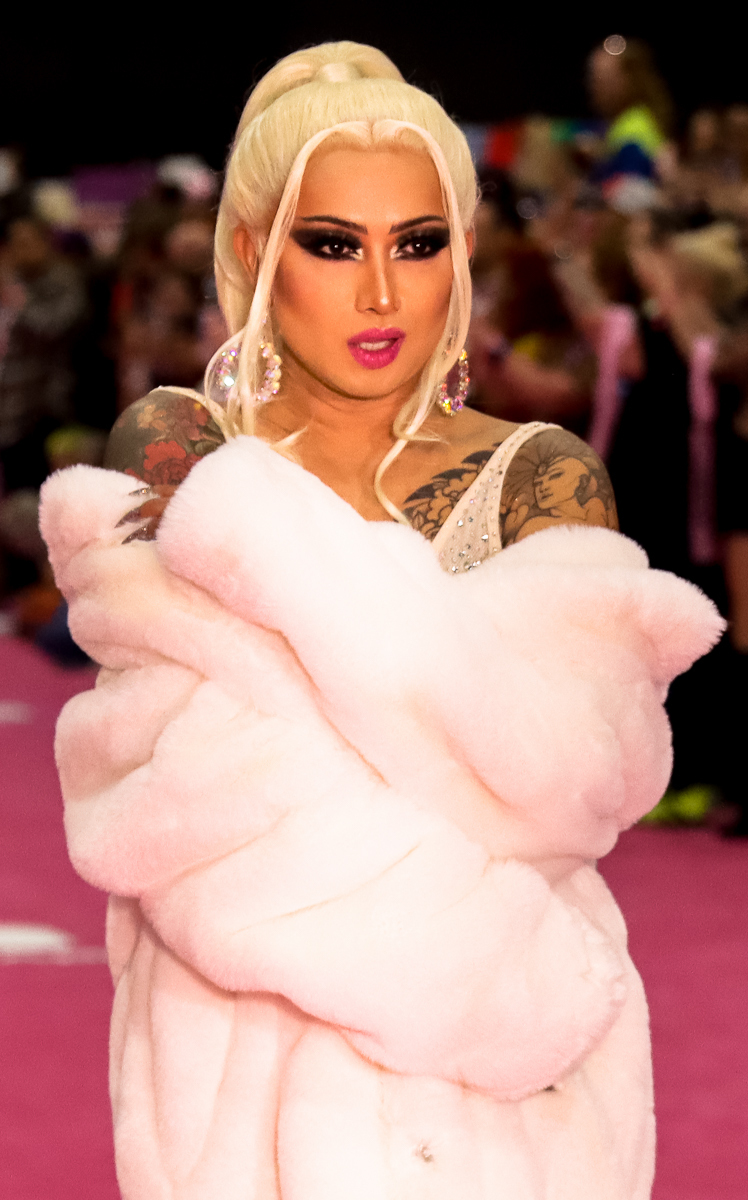
Ongina at RuPaul's DragCon LA in 2023

In 2020, she was featured in Magnus Hastings' Rainbow Revolution photography book. She hosted the 2021 Los Angeles AIDS Walk, and was featured in an accompanied televised special, Localish LA AIDS Walk Special. In July 2022, Ongina headlined the 10th year of Hagerstown Hopes and Hagerstown Pride festival.

Ongina frequently streams on Twitch.

== Activism ==
Since coming out as HIV-positive, Ongina has become an HIV activist. He was the host for the online web show HIV and Me, a talk show featuring interviews with different individuals on how they live with HIV/AIDS. Ongina also was a spokesperson for OraQuick, one of the first at-home HIV testing kits, in 2013. He won the NewNowNext Award for Most Addictive Reality Star in 2009.

RuPaul's 2009 song "LadyBoy" was inspired by Ongina.

In an interview with amFAR, Ongina said he used his drag persona to advocate for HIV, trans equality, and basic human rights awareness.

== Personal life ==
Palao is openly gay. He was diagnosed as HIV-positive on April 13, 2006. He married his husband, Ryan, in 2010. He currently lives in Los Angeles. Palao is involved in an amFAR campaign called Epic Voices, whose mission is to find a cure for AIDS by 2030 and to reengage the conversation about the virus.

In July 2024, Palao announced that she would be taking a break from drag.

== Discography ==
As Featured Artist

Title	Year	Album
"I'm in Love" (with the Cast of RuPaul's Drag Race All Stars, Season 5)	2020	Non-album single

== Filmography ==
=== Television ===
Year	Title	Role	Notes	Ref
2009	RuPaul's Drag Race (season 1)	Herself	Contestant (5th place)	
2010–11	RuPaul's Drag U	Herself	Guest	
2010	One Night Stand Up	Herself	Episode: "Dragtastic"	
2012	RuPaul's Drag Race (season 4)	Zombie	Episode: "RuPocalypse Now!"	
2012	RuPaul's Drag Race All Stars (season 1)	Herself	Guest - Episode 6	
2018	RuPaul's Drag Race (season 10)	Herself	Guest - Episode 1	
2019	RuPaul's Drag Race (season 11)	Herself	Guest - Episode 1	
2019	Lip Sync Battle	Backup dancer	Guest appearance	
2020	AJ and the Queen	Ongina	Guest appearance	
2020	RuPaul's Drag Race All Stars (season 5)	Herself	Contestant (9th Place)	
2020	RuPaul's Drag Race All Stars: Untucked (season 5)	Herself	Contestant (9th Place)	

=== Music videos ===
Year	Title	Artist	Role
2009	"I Gotta Feeling"	The Black Eyed Peas	Party-goer
2015	”Not a Pearl”	Willam Belli	Herself

=== Web series ===
Year	Title	Role	Notes	Ref
2014	HIV and Me	Herself	Host	
2014	Ring My Bell	Herself	Guest	
2014	Wow Shopping Network	Herself	Guest; one episode	
2016	Bestie$ For Ca$h	Herself	Guest, with Thed Jewel	
2017	The Pit Stop	Herself	Special Guest	
2017	Epic Voices	Herself	amFAR mini-series	
2017	Hey Qween!	Herself	Guest	
2018	Drag Queens React	Herself	Guest, Episode: "Drag Queens React to Mamma Mia!"	
2018	Fashion Photo Ruview	Herself	Special Guest	
2018	Cosmo Queens	Herself	Guest	
2018	Wait, What?	Herself	Guest, Hosted by Kimora Blac	
2019	Tails of the City: Pets 4 Pets	Herself	Quest, Episode 2	
2019	Follow Me	Herself	Episode: "Mariah Balenciaga"	
2020	The Vivienne Takes On Hollywood	Herself	Guest appearance	
2020	The X Change Rate	Herself	Guest	
2020	Whatcha Packin'	Herself	Guest	
2020	Binge	Herself	Podcast by Entertainment Weekly	
2022	Poz Vibe	Herself	Podcast	
2022	Tongue Thai'd	Herself	Guest	
2022	Fashion Photo RuView: Drag race Philippines season 1	Herself	Host	
2023	Kerri Kares	Herself	Special guest; Episode: "Being a Driven Diva"	
2023	Very Delta	Herself	Guest; Episode 72: "Do You Hieeee! Like Me?"	
2025	Binge Queens: Drag Race Philippines: Slaysian Royale	Herself	Host	
