= Mariah Paris Balenciaga =

American drag performer and television personality

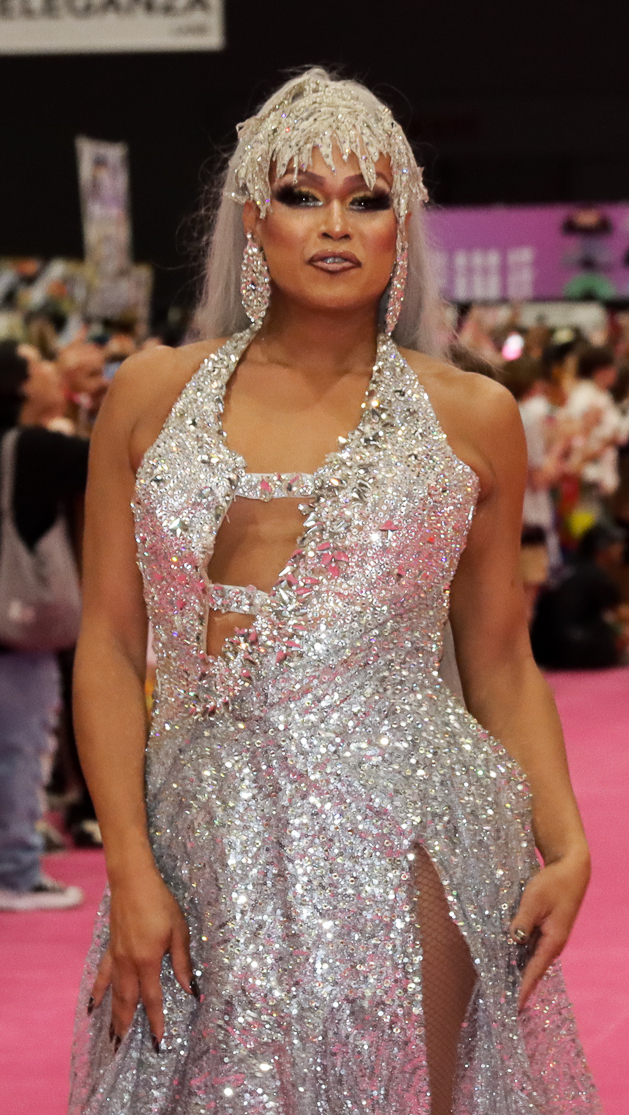
- Balenciaga at RuPaul's DragCon LA in 2024
- Born: Elijah A. Kelly; February 13, 1981 (age 45); Gainesville, Georgia, U.S.
- Other name: Mariah Balenciaga ⋅ Mariah Successful
- Occupation: Drag queen
- Years active: 1999–present
- Known for: RuPaul's Drag Race (season 3); RuPaul's Drag Race All Stars (season 5)

Mariah Paris Balenciaga, also simply known as Mariah or Mariah Balenciaga, is the stage name of Elijah A. Kelly (born February 13, 1981), an American drag queen, ball performer, and television personality, best known for competing on the third season of RuPaul's Drag Race (2011), the fifth season of RuPaul's Drag Race All Stars (2020), and the third season of RuPaul's Drag Race: UK vs. the World (2026). Since appearing on the show, she has been featured in a number of web series produced by World of Wonder, such as Wait, What?, Transformations, and Fashion Photo RuView. Balenciaga released her first single, "Mug 4 Dayz", on November 19, 2013.

== Early life ==
Kelly was born on February 13, 1981, in Gainesville, Georgia. She later moved to Atlanta when she was 19, and started doing drag in the ballroom scene, becoming a founding member of the House of Balenciaga. She is biracial.

== Career ==
Balenciaga was announced as one of thirteen contestants for the third season of RuPaul's Drag Race in 2011. She was eliminated in the sixth episode after losing a lip sync to "Looking for a New Love" by Jody Watley against Delta Work. In 2018, she appeared with other Drag Race alumni for the first mini challenge of season ten. She asked a viewer question to Eureka O'Hara during the season ten finale episode. She appeared as a guest for the first challenge in the premiere of season eleven of Drag Race. Balenciaga was also a drag professor for the second and third season of RuPaul's Drag U in 2011 and 2012.

Outside of Drag Race, she makes guest appearances for the WOWPresents Internet series "Fashion Photo RuView" filling in for either Raja or Raven, reviewing looks from Drag Race alumni. Her first appearance was on June 9, 2016. She also makes recurring appearances on another WOW series, "Wait, What?" as the co-host to Kimora Blac, where they answer trivia questions. Her first appearance was in the debut episode.

Balenciaga was with other Drag Race alumni for an episode of Skin Wars in 2015. She was one of the performers for Phi Phi O'Hara's benefit show for the hurricane in Puerto Rico.

She was one of the background dancers for Miley Cyrus's 2015 VMA performance. She was a background dancer again, playing as one of the Spice Girls for Rita Ora on an episode of Lip Sync Battle in March 2018. She was a backup dancer for Lip Sync Battle again in 2019 for Nico Tortorella.

In August 2019, she was featured in Women's Wear Daily magazine, alongside Kimora Blac, Mayhem Miller, and Kameron Michaels.

In 2020, Balenciaga returned for the fifth season of RuPaul's Drag Race All Stars, placing 8th overall. Her performance in the first episode was praised for raising awareness of systemic racism and prejudice, made particularly timely in wake of the Black Lives Matter movement, and Balenciaga was even given a shoutout by current guest judge Ricky Martin for her performance.

In September 2020, Balenciaga was featured alongside many other black RuPaul's Drag Race alum in a "Stop The Racism" PSA, speaking out against toxic, racist fans within the Drag Race community.

She was a featured performer during Jennifer Lopez's performance at the 2022 iHeartRadio Music Awards.

=== Music ===
Balenciaga released her first single, "Mug 4 Dayz", on November 19, 2013. A remix EP of the song was released on April 11, 2014. Balenciaga appeared in the music video for Pandora Boxx's "Oops I Think I Pooped" on September 24, 2018. She appeared in a music video for Lizzo's song "Juice" on April 17, 2019. She appeared in a music video for pop duo Aly & AJ's song "Star Maps" on June 12, 2019.

== Discography ==
=== EPs ===
Title	Details
Mug 4 Dayz Stone Cold Remixes	Released: 2014; Label: A Ben Gi Beat; Formats: digital download

Singles

Year	Song
2013	"Mug 4 Dayz"
2020	"Stains on the Wall"

As Featured Artist

Title	Year	Album
"I'm in Love" (with the Cast of RuPaul's Drag Race All Stars, Season 5)	2020	Non-album single

== Filmography ==
=== Television ===
Year	Title	Role	Notes	Ref(s)
2011	RuPaul's Drag Race (season 3)	Herself	Contestant (9th place)	
2011	RuPaul's Drag Race: Untucked	Herself		
2011-12	RuPaul's Drag U	Herself		
2015	Skin Wars	Herself	Season 2 - episode 4	
2018	RuPaul's Drag Race (season 10)	Herself	Guest - Episode 1	
2018	Lip Sync Battle	Herself	Backup dancer	
2018	The Assassination of Gianni Versace: American Crime Story	Drag Queen	Cameo role - episode 2	
2019	RuPaul's Drag Race (season 11)	Herself	Guest - Episode 1	
2019	Lip Sync Battle	Herself	Background dancer	
2020	AJ and the Queen	Herself	Guest appearance	
2020	RuPaul's Drag Race All Stars (season 5)	Herself	Contestant (8th place)	
2020	RuPaul's Drag Race All Stars: Untucked (season 2)	Herself	Contestant (8th place)	
2021	The Browns	Herself	Guest appearance	
2026	RuPaul's Drag Race: UK vs. the World (season 3)	Herself	Contestant (3rd Place)	

=== Web series ===
Year	Title	Role	Ref.
2014	Transformations	Herself	
2015	Rooftop Lipsync	Herself	
2015-2019	Drag Queens React	Herself	
2016–19	Fashion Photo RuView	Herself	
2016–19	Wait, What?	Herself	
2017	M.U.G.	Herself	
2017	Spilling the Tea	Herself	
2018	Cosmo Queens	Herself	
2019	Wigs in a Blanket	Herself	
2019	Bootleg Opinions	Herself	
2019	Follow Me	Herself	
2019	Iconic	Herself	
2019	Reading Queens	Herself	
2019-23	The Pit Stop	Herself	
2020	Whatcha Packin'	Herself	
2021	Hey Qween!	Herself	
2023	Binge Queens: Drag Race Mexico	Herself	

=== Music videos ===
Year	Title	Artist
2016	Expensive	Todrick Hall
2017	Expensive (Deluxe Version)	Todrick Hall
2017	Stun	Alaska ft. Gia Gunn
2018	Oops I Think I Pooped	Pandora Boxx
2018	Excuse The Beauty	Latrice Royale
2018	Girly	John Duff
2019	Juice	Lizzo
2019	Star Maps	Aly & AJ
