= RuPaul's Drag Race All Stars season 5 =

2020 season of RuPaul's Drag Race All Stars

RuPaul's Drag Race All Stars
- Season 5
- Promotional poster for Season 5
- Hosted by: RuPaul
- Judges: RuPaul; Michelle Visage; Carson Kressley; Ross Mathews
- No. of contestants: 10
- Winner: Shea Couleé
- Runners-up: Jujubee; Miz Cracker
- Companion show: RuPaul's Drag Race: Untucked!
- No. of episodes: 8

Release
- Original network: VH1
- Original release: June 5 – July 24, 2020

Season chronology
- ← Previous; Season 4 Next → Season 6

The fifth season of RuPaul's Drag Race All Stars was announced by VH1 on August 19, 2019.

On February 20, 2020, the show's official Twitter account announced the season premiere date of June 5, 2020, on Showtime. Following the cast announcement on May 8, 2020, producers announced that the show would instead air on VH1 due to the COVID-19 pandemic, which caused "various scheduling and programming adjustments".

The official trailer announced a change in the elimination rules: Unlike seasons 2, 3, and 4 of All Stars, only a single challenge winner is named each week. The winning queen then lip syncs for her legacy against a guest Lip Sync Assassin from a previous season. If the challenge winner wins the lip sync, she gains the power to eliminate one of the queens in the bottom and win a $10,000 prize. If the Assassin wins, the eliminated queen is determined after a majority vote by the rest of the contestants, and the $10,000 prize rolls over to further episodes until a contestant wins the lip sync.

The winner of RuPaul's Drag Race All Stars received a one-year supply of Anastasia Beverly Hills Cosmetics and a cash prize of $100,000. All Stars 5 was the first All Stars season since All Stars 1 to have an Untucked aftershow. Shea Couleé was declared the winner, with Jujubee and Miz Cracker named runners up.

== Contestants ==
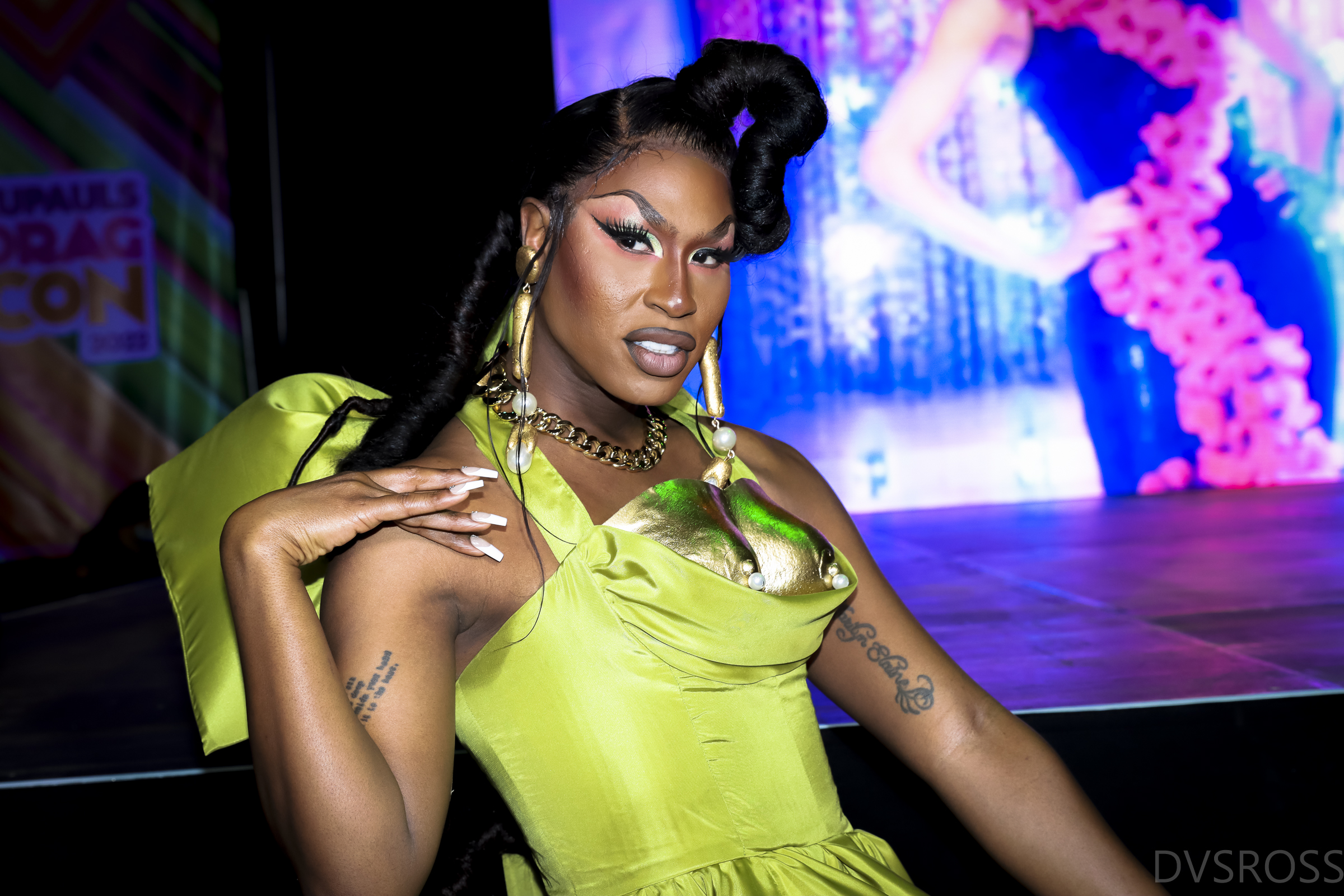
The winner, Shea Couleé.

Ages, names, and cities stated are at time of filming.

Contestants of RuPaul's Drag Race All Stars season 5 and their backgrounds
Contestant	Age	Hometown	Original season(s)	Original placement(s)	Outcome
Shea Couleé	30	Chicago, Illinois	Season 9	3rd place	Winner
Jujubee	34	Boston, Massachusetts	Season 2	3rd place	Runners-up
Jujubee	34	Boston, Massachusetts	All Stars 1	3rd place	Runners-up
Miz Cracker	35	New York City, New York	Season 10	5th place	Runners-up
Blair St. Clair	24	Washington, D.C.	Season 10	9th place	4th place
Alexis Mateo	39	Las Vegas, Nevada	Season 3	3rd place	5th place
Alexis Mateo	39	Las Vegas, Nevada	All Stars 1	5th place	5th place
India Ferrah	33	Las Vegas, Nevada	Season 3	10th place	6th place
Mayhem Miller	37	Riverside, California	Season 10	10th place	7th place (Note: Mayhem Miller voted to eliminate herself.)
Mariah Paris Balenciaga (Note: Mariah Paris Balenciaga was referred to as Mariah on season 3.)	37	Los Angeles, California	Season 3	9th place	8th place
Ongina	37	Los Angeles, California	Season 1	5th place	9th place (Note: Ongina voted to eliminate herself.)
Derrick Barry	35	Las Vegas, Nevada	Season 8	5th place	10th place

== Contestant progress ==
Legend:

Shea Couleé won RuPaul's Drag Race All Stars season 5.
Miz Cracker and Jujubee were the runners-up.
WIN indicates that the contestant won the challenge and the Lip Sync for Your Legacy.
TOP indicates that the contestant won the challenge, but lost the Lip Sync for Your Legacy.
SAFE indicates that the contestant was declared safe by the judges.
BTM (Bottom) indicates that the contestant was up for elimination.
ELIM (Eliminated) indicates that the contestant was eliminated.
Guest indicates that the contestant returned as a guest.

Contestants progress with placements in each episode
Contestant	Episode							
Contestant	1	2	3	4	5	6	7	8
Shea Couleé	SAFE	WIN	BTM	SAFE	WIN	BTM	BTM	Winner
Jujubee	SAFE	SAFE	TOP	SAFE	BTM	BTM	BTM	Runner-up
Miz Cracker	SAFE	SAFE	SAFE	WIN	BTM	TOP	WIN	Runner-up
Blair St. Clair	SAFE	SAFE	SAFE	SAFE	BTM	BTM	ELIM	Guest
Alexis Mateo	SAFE	SAFE	SAFE	SAFE	BTM	ELIM		Guest
India Ferrah	TOP	BTM	BTM	BTM	ELIM			Guest
Mayhem Miller	BTM	SAFE	SAFE	ELIM				Guest
Mariah Paris Balenciaga	SAFE	BTM	ELIM					Guest
Ongina	SAFE	ELIM						Guest
Derrick Barry	ELIM							Guest

== Lip syncs ==
Legend:

The contestant was eliminated after their first time in the bottom.
The contestant was eliminated after their second time in the bottom.
The contestant was eliminated after their third time in the bottom.
The contestant was eliminated after their fourth time in the bottom.
The contestant won the Lip Sync for the Crown and was declared the winner of the season.

Episode	Top All Star (Elimination)	vs.	Lip Sync Assassin (Elimination)	Song	Winner(s)	Bottom	Eliminated
1	India Ferrah (Derrick)	vs.	Yvie Oddly (Derrick)	"Livin' la Vida Loca" (Ricky Martin)	Yvie Oddly	Derrick, Mayhem	Derrick Barry
2	Shea Couleé (Ongina)	vs.	Alyssa Edwards (Ongina)	"Neutron Dance" (The Pointer Sisters)	Shea Couleé	India, Mariah, Ongina	Ongina
3	Jujubee (Mariah)	vs.	Monét X Change (Mariah)	"Juice" (Lizzo)	Monét X Change	India, Mariah, Shea	Mariah Paris Balenciaga
4	Miz Cracker (Mayhem)	vs.	Morgan McMichaels (Mayhem)	"Where Have You Been" (Rihanna)	Miz Cracker	India, Mayhem	Mayhem Miller
4	Miz Cracker (Mayhem)	vs.	Morgan McMichaels (Mayhem)	"Where Have You Been" (Rihanna)	Morgan McMichaels	India, Mayhem	Mayhem Miller
5	Shea Couleé (India)	vs.	Vanessa Vanjie Mateo (India)	"Open Your Heart" (Madonna)	Shea Couleé	Alexis, Blair, India, Jujubee, Miz Cracker	India Ferrah
6	Miz Cracker (Alexis)	vs.	Roxxxy Andrews (Alexis)	"One Last Time" (Ariana Grande)	Roxxxy Andrews	Alexis, Blair, Jujubee, Shea	Alexis Mateo
7	Miz Cracker (Blair)	vs.	Kennedy Davenport (Blair)	"Fancy" (Reba McEntire)	Miz Cracker	Blair, Jujubee, Shea	Blair St. Clair
Episode	Final All Stars			Song	Winner		
8	Jujubee vs. Miz Cracker vs. Shea Couleé			"Make Me Feel" (Janelle Monáe)	Shea Couleé		

== Voting history ==
The Top All Star won the Lip Sync for Your Legacy.
The Lip Sync Assassin won the Lip Sync for Your Legacy.
The contestant was up for elimination, but not eliminated.
The contestant was eliminated.
The elimination was determined by the Top All Star since they won the Lip Sync for Your Legacy.
The elimination was determined by the group's vote since the Lip Sync Assassin won the Lip Sync for Your Legacy.
The elimination was determined by both the group and the Top All Star's votes since the Lip Sync for Your Legacy resulted in a tie.

Summary of weekly voting and results
Episode	1	2	3	4	5	6	7
Deciding vote	Group	Shea	Group	Cracker	Shea	Group	Cracker
Deciding vote	Group	Shea	Group	Group	Shea	Group	Cracker
Shea	Derrick	Ongina	Mariah	Mayhem	India	Alexis	~~Blair~~
Jujubee	Mayhem	~~Ongina~~	~~Mariah~~	Mayhem	~~India~~	Alexis	~~Blair~~
Cracker	Derrick	~~Ongina~~	Mariah	Mayhem	~~India~~	~~Alexis~~	Blair
Blair	Derrick	~~Ongina~~	Mariah	Mayhem	~~India~~	Alexis	~~Jujubee~~
Alexis	Derrick	~~Ongina~~	Shea	Mayhem	~~India~~	Blair	
India	~~Derrick~~	~~Ongina~~	Mariah	Mayhem	~~Alexis~~		
Mayhem	Derrick	~~Ongina~~	Shea	Mayhem			
Mariah	Derrick	~~Ongina~~	India				
Ongina	Derrick	~~Ongina~~					
Derrick	Mayhem						
Eliminated	Derrick	Ongina	Mariah	Mayhem	India	Alexis	Blair

== Guest judges ==
- Ricky Martin, actor and singer
- Madison Beer, singer
- Tessa Thompson, actress and singer
- Martyn Lawrence Bullard, interior designer
- Nicole Byer, stand-up comedian
- Sarah Hyland, actress
- Jeffrey Bowyer-Chapman, actor and Canada's Drag Race judge
- Tommy Dorfman, actor
- Bebe Rexha, singer
- Jane Krakowski, actress and singer
- Sam Richardson, actor
- Todrick Hall, singer and choreographer

=== Special guests ===
Guests who appeared in episodes but did not judge on the main stage (in order of appearance):

Episode 2

- Leland, singer-songwriter, composer, and record producer
- Freddy Scott, composer and actor

Episode 8

- Monét X Change and Trinity the Tuck, contestants on season ten and nine, respectively, and winners of the fourth season of All Stars

== Episodes ==
No. overall	No. in season	Title	Original release date
34	1	"All Star Variety Extravaganza"	June 5, 2020
Ten all-stars enter the workroom. RuPaul comes in and introduces a new twist happening for the season. Instead of the top two all-stars lip-syncing for their legacy, only one all-star will be the winning queen of the week. That winner will lip-sync against a secret lip-sync assassin. All queens will then vote for which bottom all-star of the week should get eliminated. If the all-star wins the lip-sync, their chosen lipstick decides who to eliminate from the competition. If the lip-sync assassin wins the lip-sync, the votes cast by the other queens dictate who will get eliminated. For the mini-challenge, the queens read each other. Blair St. Clair and Jujubee win the mini-challenge. For the main challenge, the queens must perform a talent in front of the judges and a live audience.: Alexis Mateo - Lip-Syncing/Dancing; Blair St. Clair - Live Singing; Derrick Barry - Stand Up; India Ferrah - Lip-Syncing/Dancing; Jujubee - Live Singing; Mariah Paris Balenciaga - Spoken Word; Mayhem Miller - Live Singing; Miz Cracker - Lip-Syncing; Ongina - Dancing; Shea Couleé - Pole Dancing; On the runway, Alexis Mateo, India Ferrah and Miz Cracker receive positive critiques, with India Ferrah being the top all-star of the week. Derrick Barry, Mayhem Miller and Ongina receive negative critiques, with Derrick Barry and Mayhem Miller being the bottom two all-stars of the week. It is then revealed that Season 11's winner Yvie Oddly is this week's lip-sync assassin. India Ferrah and Yvie Oddly then lip-sync to "Livin' la Vida Loca" by Ricky Martin. Yvie Oddly wins the lip-sync and reveals that the group has voted to eliminate Derrick Barry from the competition.: Guest Judge: Ricky Martin; Mini-Challenge: Reading Is Fundamental; Mini-Challenge Winners: Blair St. Clair and Jujubee; Mini-challenge Prize: $2,000 gift card to Marek+Richard; Main Challenge: Perform a talent show in front of the judges and a live audience.; Challenge Winner: India Ferrah; Main Challenge Prize: 5-day trip to Reykjavik, Iceland. Hotel and airfare included courtesy of Pink Iceland; Lip Sync Assassin: Yvie Oddly; Lip Sync Song: "Livin' la Vida Loca" by Ricky Martin; Lip Sync for Your Legacy Winner: Yvie Oddly; Bottom Two: Derrick Barry and Mayhem Miller; Eliminated: Derrick Barry; Farewell Message: "SHOW UP. SHOW OUT. ♡Derrick Barry. I love you Jujubee"
35	2	"I'm in Love!"	June 12, 2020
India Ferrah reveals she would have eliminated Derrick Barry from the competition, had she won the lip-sync. For the main challenge, the queens will form girl groups where they must write, record and choreograph a performance to "I'm in Love!". They must pick a celebrity crush that they have and sing about them for the performance. Team India Ferrah: Alexis Mateo - Daddy Yankee; India Ferrah - Justin Timberlake; Jujubee - John Stamos; Team Blair St. Clair: Blair St. Clair - Hannibal Lecter; Mayhem Miller - Mr. Rogers; Miz Cracker - Sylvester Stallone; Team Shea Couleé: Mariah Paris Balenciaga - Jason Momoa; Ongina - Henry Cavill; Shea Couleé - Chadwick Boseman; On the runway, category is Love the Skin You're In. Blair St. Clair, Jujubee and Shea Couleé receive positive critiques, with Shea Couleé being the top all-star of the week. India Ferrah, Mariah Paris Balenciaga and Ongina receive negative critiques and are the bottom three all-stars of the week. Backstage, Ongina tells the girls that she's okay with going home, after thinking it's not fair for the other two queens in the bottom to go home, which upsets the other queens. It is then revealed that Season 5 and All-Stars 2 queen Alyssa Edwards is the lip-sync assassin this week. Shea Couleé and Alyssa Edwards then lip-sync to "Neutron Dance" by The Pointer Sisters. Shea Couleé wins the lip-sync and decides to eliminate Ongina from the competition.: Guest Judges: Madison Beer and Tessa Thompson; Main Challenge: Write, record, and choreograph a performance to "I'm in Love!" on the mainstage.; Runway Theme: Love the Skin You're In; Challenge Winner: Shea Couleé; Main Challenge Prize: 6-night all-inclusive trip for two to Puerto Vallarta at the Almar Resort; Lip Sync Assassin: Alyssa Edwards; Lip Sync Song: "Neutron Dance" by The Pointer Sisters; Lip Sync for Your Legacy Winner: Shea Couleé; Bottom Three: India Ferrah, Mariah Paris Balenciaga, and Ongina; Eliminated: Ongina; Farewell Message: "I can't wait for our friendships to blossom more outside of this workroom. I love you! Ongina ♡"
36	3	"Get a Room!"	June 19, 2020
It is revealed that Ongina voted for herself to go home, much to the dismay of the other queens. For the main challenge, the queens must design and present a signature hotel suite in teams. Miz Cracker, Mariah Paris Balenciaga and Shea Couleé have "The Golden Gals' Palace & Resort". Alexis Mateo, India Ferrah and Jujubee have "The GlamaZone". Blair St. Clair and Mayhem Miller have "The 24K Experience". On the runway, category is 3 Looks in 1. It is then announced that RuPaul's favorite hotel suite was Blair St. Clair's and Mayhem Miller's. However, her favorite performance was Jujubee's making Jujubee the top all-star of the week. India Ferrah, Mariah Paris Balenciaga and Shea Couleé receive negative critiques and are the bottom three all-stars of the week. It is then revealed that Season 10 and All Stars 4 winner Monét X Change is the lip-sync assassin this week. Jujubee and Monét X Change then lip-sync to "Juice" by Lizzo. Monét X Change wins the lip-sync and reveals that the group has voted to eliminate Mariah Paris Balenciaga from the competition.: Guest Judges: Nicole Byer and Martyn Lawrence Bullard; Main Challenge: Design and present a signature hotel suite.; Runway Theme: 3 Looks in 1; Challenge Winner: Jujubee; Main Challenge Prize: 7-night stay for two in the Penthouse Suite at The Grand Resort and Spa in Fort Lauderdale, Florida; Lip Sync Assassin: Monét X Change; Lip Sync Song: "Juice" by Lizzo; Lip Sync for Your Legacy Winner: Monét X Change; Bottom Three: India Ferrah, Mariah Paris Balenciaga, and Shea Couleé; Eliminated: Mariah Paris Balenciaga; Farewell Message: "Thanks for making this a better experience. Love, Mariah AKA Balenciaga AKA Paris AKA Successful AKA Bottom. Mug4Dayz ♡X♡"
37	4	"SheMZ"	June 26, 2020
Jujubee reveals she would have eliminated Mariah Paris Balenciaga from the competition, had she won the lip-sync. For the main challenge, the queens will improv in a spoof of the celebrity gossip show called SheMZ. Team 1: Alexis Mateo: A messy drag queen who's been fired from The Fake Housewives of Tuckahoe for being too trashy; Shea Couleé: A icy drag queen who's been fired from The Fake Housewives of Tuckahoe for being too fake; Team 2: Blair St. Clair: An obnoxious ungrateful daughter; Jujubee: An overprotective drag mother; Miz Cracker: A shady queen at the center of a college admissions scandal; Team 3: India Ferrah: A celebrity who's a chronic shoplifter; Mayhem Miller: A thirsty shop girl who catches the shoplifter in the act; On the runway, category is C'mon, Camo Couture! Alexis Mateo, Jujubee and Miz Cracker receive positive critiques, with Miz Cracker being the top all-star of the week. India Ferrah and Mayhem Miller receive negative critiques and are the bottom two all-stars of the week. It is revealed that Season 2 and All-Stars 3 queen Morgan McMichaels is the lip-sync assassin. Miz Cracker and Morgan McMichaels lip-sync to "Where Have You Been" by Rihanna. Miz Cracker and Morgan McMichaels both win the lip-sync. It is announced that both Miz Cracker and the queens voted to eliminate Mayhem Miller from the competition.: Guest Judge: Sarah Hyland; Main Challenge: Improv in a drag queen spoof of the celebrity gossip and drama television show, TMZ, called SheMZ.; Runway Theme: C'mon, Camo Couture!; Challenge Winner: Miz Cracker; Main Challenge Prize: 4-night stay in Montreal, Canada including hotel and airfare, courtesy of Tourisme/Montreal; Lip Sync Assassin: Morgan McMichaels; Lip Sync Song: "Where Have You Been" by Rihanna; Lip Sync for Your Legacy Winners: Miz Cracker and Morgan McMichaels; Bottom Two: India Ferrah and Mayhem Miller; Eliminated: Mayhem Miller; Farewell Message: "I am the QUEEN"
38	5	"Snatch Game of Love"	July 3, 2020
The queens are shocked when they find out that Mayhem Miller voted for herself to be eliminated from the competition. For the main challenge, the queens will play the Snatch Game of Love. The queens will be vying for the love of special guest judges Jeffrey Bowyer-Chapman and Tommy Dorfman Vying for Tommy Dorfman's love are: Alexis Mateo as Walter Mercado; India Ferrah as Jeffree Star; Miz Cracker as Lady Gaga; Vying for Jeffrey Bowyer-Chapman's love are: Blair St. Clair as Ellen DeGeneres; Jujubee as Eartha Kitt; Shea Couleé as Flavor Flav; On the runway, category is Prom Queen Fantasy. Shea Couleé is announced the top all-star of the week. Alexis Mateo and Jujubee receive positive critiques whereas Blair St Clair, India Ferrah and Miz Cracker receive negative critiques however RuPaul then announces from here on out, if you are not the top all-star of the week, you are the bottom all-star and are at risk of getting eliminated. It is then revealed that Season 10 and 11 queen Vanessa Vanjie Mateo is the lip-sync assassin. Shea Couleé and Vanessa Vanjie Mateo then lip-sync to "Open Your Heart" by Madonna. Shea Couleé wins the lip-sync and decides to eliminate India Ferrah from the competition.: Guest Judges: Jeffrey Bowyer-Chapman and Tommy Dorfman; Main Challenge: Impersonate celebrities for the game show "Snatch Game of Love"; Runway Theme: Prom Queen Fantasy; Challenge Winner: Shea Couleé; Main Challenge Prize: 7-night stay in Paris, including hotel and airfare, courtesy of misterb&b; Lip Sync Assassin: Vanessa Vanjie Mateo; Lip Sync Song: "Open Your Heart" by Madonna; Lip Sync for Your Legacy Winner: Shea Couleé; Bottom Five: Alexis Mateo, Blair St. Clair, India Ferrah, Jujubee and Miz Cracker; Eliminated: India Ferrah; Farewell Message: "Ladies, thank you all for showing me kindness still exists! The truth shall set you free!!! xoxo, India Ferrah. Humble ✓ Heart ✓ Happy ✓ Honest ✓ Love and Lashes!"
39	6	"The Charles Family Backyard Ball"	July 10, 2020
It is revealed that the group also chose to eliminate India Ferrah from the competition. For the main challenge, the queens must make two looks for the Charles Family Backyard Ball. The first look is a Country Cousin look. The second look is Backyard Eleganza, which must be made out of materials found in a garden. On the runway, Miz Cracker is revealed to be the top all-star of the week, with Alexis Mateo, Blair St. Clair, Jujubee and Shea Couleé being the bottom four queens of the week. It is then revealed that Season 5 and All-Stars 2 queen Roxxxy Andrews is this week's lip-sync assassin. Miz Cracker and Roxxxy Andrews lip-sync to "One Last Time" by Ariana Grande. Roxxxy Andrews wins the lip-sync and reveals that the queens have voted to eliminate Alexis Mateo from the competition.: Guest Judge: Bebe Rexha; Main Challenge: Present an original character, a "country cousin" of RuPaul, and an outfit made from materials found in a garden; Runway Theme: Country Cousin Realness and Backyard Eleganza; Challenge Winner: Miz Cracker; Main Challenge Prize: Five-night stay for two in London, United Kingdom including hotel and airfare, courtesy of The Lalit London; Lip Sync Assassin: Roxxxy Andrews; Lip Sync Song: "One Last Time" by Ariana Grande; Lip Sync for Your Legacy Winner: Roxxxy Andrews; Bottom Four: Alexis Mateo, Blair St. Clair, Jujubee and Shea Couleé; Eliminated: Alexis Mateo; Farewell Message: "Love you all, BAM. Be your best, but be happy ♡ AS5"
40	7	"Stand-Up Smackdown"	July 17, 2020
Miz Cracker reveals she would have eliminated Alexis Mateo from the competition, had she won the lip-sync. For the main challenge, the queens must perform a stand-up comedy routine. On the runway, category is Freak Out! Miz Cracker is revealed to be the top all-star of the week, with Blair St. Clair, Jujubee and Shea Couleé being the bottom three all-stars of the week. It is then revealed that Season 7 and All-Stars 3 queen Kennedy Davenport is the lip-sync assassin of the week. Miz Cracker and Kennedy Davenport then lip-sync to "Fancy" by Reba McEntire. Miz Cracker wins the lip-sync and decides to eliminate Blair St. Clair from the competition.: Guest Judges: Jane Krakowski and Sam Richardson; Main Challenge: Perform a stand-up comedy routine; Runway Theme: Freak Out!; Challenge Winner: Miz Cracker; Main Challenge Prize: Eight-night safari trip in South Africa, courtesy of South African Tourism; Lip Sync Assassin: Kennedy Davenport; Lip Sync Song: "Fancy" by Reba McEntire; Lip Sync for Your Legacy Winner: Miz Cracker; Bottom Three: Blair St. Clair, Jujubee and Shea Couleé; Eliminated: Blair St. Clair; Farewell Message: "Never stop dreaming & Never stop believing! Ps: And do the shimmy shush! I love you all so much! Daddy Rich! Blair St. Clair"
41	8	"Clap Back!"	July 24, 2020
For the final challenge, the queens must write, record and perform a verse to the remix of RuPaul's song "Clap Back".: Guest Judge: Todrick Hall; Main Challenge: Write, record, and perform a verse to the remix of RuPaul's song "Clap Back"; Runway Theme: All Star Eleganza; Final Three: Jujubee, Miz Cracker and Shea Couleé; Lip Sync Song: "Make Me Feel" by Janelle Monáe; Runners-up: Jujubee and Miz Cracker; Winner of RuPaul's Drag Race All Stars Season Five: Shea Couleé

== Ratings ==
Viewership and ratings per episode of RuPaul's Drag Race All Stars season 5
No.	Title	Air date	Rating (18–49)	Viewers (millions)
1	"All Star Variety Extravaganza"	June 5, 2020	0.28	0.615
2	"I'm in Love!"	June 12, 2020	0.25	0.567
3	"Get a Room!"	June 19, 2020	0.22	0.507
4	"SheMZ"	June 26, 2020	0.23	0.541
5	"Snatch Game of Love"	July 3, 2020	0.18	0.386
6	"The Charles Family Backyard Ball"	July 10, 2020	0.22	0.514
7	"Stand-Up Smackdown"	July 17, 2020	0.19	0.454
8	"Clap Back!"	July 24, 2020	0.27	0.567
