= RuPaul's Secret Celebrity Drag Race =

Reality competition

- Genre: Reality competition
- Based on: RuPaul's Drag Race
- Directed by: Nick Murray
- Judges: RuPaul; Michelle Visage; Ross Mathews; Carson Kressley
- Theme music composer: RuPaul
- Opening theme: "RuPaul's Drag Race" theme
- Ending theme: "American" (season 1); "I'm A Winner, Baby" (season 2)
- Country of origin: United States
- Original language: English
- No. of seasons: 2
- No. of episodes: 12

Production
- Executive producers: Fenton Bailey; Randy Barbato; Tom Campbell; RuPaul Charles; Steven Corfe; San Heng; Tim Palazzola; Mandy Salangsang
- Camera setup: Multi-camera
- Running time: 90 minutes
- Production company: World of Wonder

Original release
- Network: VH1
- Release: April 24, 2020 – September 30, 2022

Related
- RuPaul's Drag Race

RuPaul's Secret Celebrity Drag Race is an American reality competition series that premiered April 24, 2020 on VH1. A spin-off of RuPaul's Drag Race, the series features celebrities competing for charity, as mentored by alumni of the Drag Race franchise.

The first season consisted of self-contained episodes based on the format of the main series, each featuring three celebrity contestants competing in challenges to win money for their chosen charity. For the second season, the format was changed to a season-length competition focused on lip sync performances. The field of celebrities was concealed via drag personas, with their identity revealed upon elimination.

== Format ==
Both seasons of the series have featured celebrity contestants competing for charity, becoming drag performers mentored by alumni ("Queen Supremes") from past seasons of the RuPaul's Drag Race franchise.

In its first season, each episode was a self-contained competition between three contestants, who competed in "fan favorite" Drag Race challenges. Similarly to the main series, each episode featured mini and maxi challenges, followed by a final lip sync round to determine the winner.

The second season was retooled as a season-length competition focusing exclusively on lip sync performances, with some similarities to the music competition series The Masked Singer; the season began with a cast of nine contestants, identified only by drag personas. In each episode, the contestants give a solo lip sync performance for the judges and a studio audience. The bottom two contestants compete in a "Lip Sync for Your Life" round to determine who is safe, with the losing contestant eliminated and required to reveal their true identity. The last remaining celebrity at the end of the season would win $100,000 for their chosen charity.

The series maintains the same judging panel as the main series, consisting of RuPaul, Michelle Visage, Carson Kressley, and Ross Mathews.

== Series overview ==
Season	Contestants	Episodes	Originally released		Winner(s)	Runner(s)-up
Season	Contestants	Episodes	First released	Last released	Winner(s)	Runner(s)-up
1	12	4	April 24, 2020	May 15, 2020	Jordan Connor - "Babykins La Roux"; Vanessa Williams - "Vanqueisha De House"; Matt Iseman - "Bette Bordeaux"; Alex Newell - "Madam That Bitch"; Dustin Milligan - "Rachel McAdamsapple"; Hayley Kiyoko - "Queen Eleza Beth"	Jermaine Fowler - "Miss Mimi Teapot"; Nico Tortorella - "Olivette Isyou"; Loni Love - "Mary J. Ross"; Tami Roman - "Miss Shenita Cocktail"; Madison Beer - "Coral Fixation"; Phoebe Robinson - "Cocotini"
2	9	8	August 12, 2022	September 30, 2022	AJ McLean - "Poppy Love"	Tatyana Ali - "Chakra 7"; Mark Indelicato - "Thirsty von Trap"

== Broadcast ==
The series was initially announced in October 2019 under the working title RuPaul's Celebrity Drag Race, with the title changed prior to launch. The first season premiered on April 24, 2020, on VH1, as a four-part miniseries. In August 2021, VH1 renewed the series for a second season, which premiered on August 12, 2022.

== Awards and nominations ==
Year	Award	Category	Nominee(s)	Result	Ref.
2020	Queerty Awards	Next Big Thing	RuPaul's Secret Celebrity Drag Race	Won	
