= Mayhem Miller (drag queen) =

American drag queen and performer

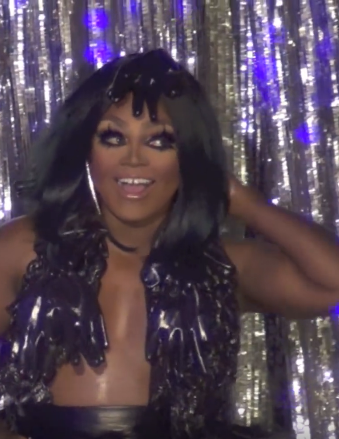
- Miller performing live in 2018
- Born: Dequan Armand Johnson; February 9, 1982 (age 44); Beverly Grove, California, U.S.
- Occupation: Drag queen
- Years active: 2002–present
- Known for: RuPaul's Drag Race (season 10); RuPaul's Drag Race All Stars (season 5); RuPaul's Drag Race: UK vs. the World (season 2)

Mayhem Miller, is the stage name of Dequan Armand Johnson (born February 9, 1982), an American drag queen, best known for competing on the tenth season of RuPaul's Drag Race (2018), the fifth season of RuPaul's Drag Race All Stars (2020), and the second series of RuPaul's Drag Race: UK vs. the World (2024).

== Early life ==
Johnson was born in Cedars-Sinai Medical Center in the Beverly Grove neighborhood of Los Angeles. He (Note: Johnson uses he/him pronouns both in and out of drag.) grew up in Riverside, California and South Central Los Angeles. He got the drag name "Mayhem Miller" from Tommy Lee and Pamela Anderson's sex tape. He started doing drag on May 10, 2002, the same year as fellow Drag Race alumna Raven and the year after Morgan McMichaels, whom Johnson worked with before Drag Race. Johnson's other drag colleagues are alum Detox and Delta Work. He auditioned for Drag Race every year beginning with season two.

== Career ==
Mayhem Miller was announced as one of fourteen contestants for the tenth season of RuPaul's Drag Race on February 22, 2018. He was declared the winner of the episode one sewing challenge. In episode three, He was in the bottom two and lip synced "Celebrity Skin" against Yuhua Hamasaki, and won. He was eliminated in episode five after losing a lip sync of "Man! I Feel Like a Woman!" against Monét X Change, and placed tenth overall.

Outside of Drag Race, Miller appeared in an episode of BuzzFeed's "Try Guys" in 2014, giving a drag makeover to Eugene Lee Yang as Cheyenne Pepper. He was one of the backup dancers for NeNe Leakes's lip sync of RuPaul's "Supermodel (You Better Work)" in the show, "Lip Sync Battle" in 2016. He played the character Blanquisha in the 2017 movie Cherry Pop with Detox, Bob the Drag Queen, Latrice Royale, and Tempest DuJour. He was with queens McMichaels, Laganja Estranja, Jaidynn Diore Fierce, and Farrah Moan and singer Rita Ora for the thirteen season of Germany's Next Topmodel in May 2018.

He was in the music video for Blair St. Clair's "Call My Life" in June 2018. An internet meme of one of Miller's 2011 video performances with overexaggerated eyes started spreading in November 2018. Miller competed in the Drag Race television special RuPaul's Drag Race Holi-slay Spectacular.

He appeared in the music video for Iggy Azalea's "Sally Walker" on March 14, 2019. He also appeared in a music video for Lizzo's song "Juice" on April 17, 2019. In 2019, Miller released his very own lipsticks in collaboration with Hank & Henry. In August 2019, he was featured in Women's Wear Daily magazine, alongside Kimora Blac, Mariah Balenciaga, and Kameron Michaels.

Miller was credited as a makeup artist for RuPaul's Secret Celebrity Drag Race, making over Jermaine Fowler during the premiere episode.

In 2020, Miller returned for the fifth season of RuPaul's Drag Race All Stars, placing 7th overall. In 2021, Mayhem returned as a Lip-Sync Assassin on the fifth episode of the sixth season of RuPaul's Drag Race All Stars, where he lost the lip-sync to Lizzo's song "Phone" against Ginger Minj.

Miller returned to compete in the second series of RuPaul's Drag Race: UK vs. the World which aired in February 2024. He was eliminated in the first episode by Marina Summers after failing the premiere talent show, bottoming a second time in the same challenge (following All Stars 5), meaning he finished last place in eleventh.

=== Music ===
Miller released his first single "Queen of the Party" featuring producer Brynn Taylor on December 7, 2018.

== Personal life ==
Johnson is gay. His drag daughters are Rhea Litré and Eugene Lee Yang (Cheyenne Pepper).

In July 2018, Johnson was refused services from an Uber driver in Minneapolis for being in drag. He expressed it on Twitter with support from his fans.

== Filmography ==
=== Film ===
Year	Title	Role
2017	Cherry Pop	Blanquisha
2021	The Bitch Who Stole Christmas	Bus Driver

=== Television ===
Year	Title	Role	Notes	Ref
2013	Tabatha Takes Over	Herself	Cameo appearance	
2016	Lip Sync Battle	Backup dancer	Guest	
2018	RuPaul's Drag Race	Herself	Contestant (10th place)	
2018	RuPaul's Drag Race: Untucked	Herself	Contestant (10th place)	
2018	Germany's Next Topmodel	Herself	Guest	
2018	RuPaul's Drag Race Holi-slay Spectacular	Herself	Contestant (Joint Winner)	
2019	Hey Qween!	Herself	Guest	
2020	AJ and the Queen	Herself	Guest	
2020	RuPaul's Drag Race	Kanye West; Andre Leon Talley	Cameo appearance (2 episodes)	
2020	RuPaul's Secret Celebrity Drag Race	Creative Consultant	Credited as Dequan Johnson	
2020	RuPaul's Drag Race All Stars (season 5)	Herself	Contestant (7th place)	
2020	RuPaul's Drag Race All Stars: Untucked	Herself	Contestant (7th place)	
2021	RuPaul's Drag Race All Stars (season 6)	Herself	"Lip-Sync Assassin" (Episode 5)	
2021	RuPaul's Drag Race All Stars: Untucked	Herself	Guest	
2023	Drag Me to Dinner	Herself	Hulu original	
2024	RuPaul's Drag Race: UK vs. the World (series 2)	Herself	Contestant (11th place)	

=== Music videos ===
Year	Title	Artist	Role
2015	”Not a Pearl”	Willam Belli	Herself
2018	"Call My Life"	Blair St. Clair	
2019	"Sally Walker"	Iggy Azalea	Funeral attendee
2019	"Juice"	Lizzo	
2020	"Ass Like Mine"	Morgan McMichaels	Herself
2020	"Nerves of Steel"	Erasure	Herself

=== Web series ===
Year	Title	Role	Ref
2014	Try Guys	Herself	
2018	Cosmo Queens	Herself	
2018	Whatcha Packin'	Herself	
2018	Hey Qween!	Herself	
2018	Queen to Queen	Herself	
2018	Countdown to the Crown	Herself	
2019	The Pit Stop	Herself	
2019	His Vintage Touch	Herself	
2019	Follow Me	Herself	
2020	ASMR Queens	Herself	
2020	The X Change Rate	Herself	
2020	Whatcha Packin	Herself	
2021	YIAY TIME	Herself	
2022	Binge Queens	Herself	
2023	Kerri Kares	Herself	
2023	The Try Guys Are Dead - The Funeral Roast	Herself	

- Bring Back My Girls (2024)

== Discography ==
=== Singles ===
Year	Title
2018	"Queen of the Party"

As Featured Artist

Title	Year	Album
"I'm in Love" (with the Cast of RuPaul's Drag Race All Stars, Season 5)	2020	Non-album single
