= Drag Race terminology =

Terminology associated with RuPaul's Drag Race

Logo for RuPaul's Drag Race

A number of slang terms have been used on Drag Race. Some terms in the list already existed within drag culture, but were more widely popularized by their use on various iterations of the show, while others originated within the franchise itself. During his 2018 appearance on The Late Show with Stephen Colbert, RuPaul described some of the show's terminology to host Stephen Colbert.

== List of terms and definitions ==
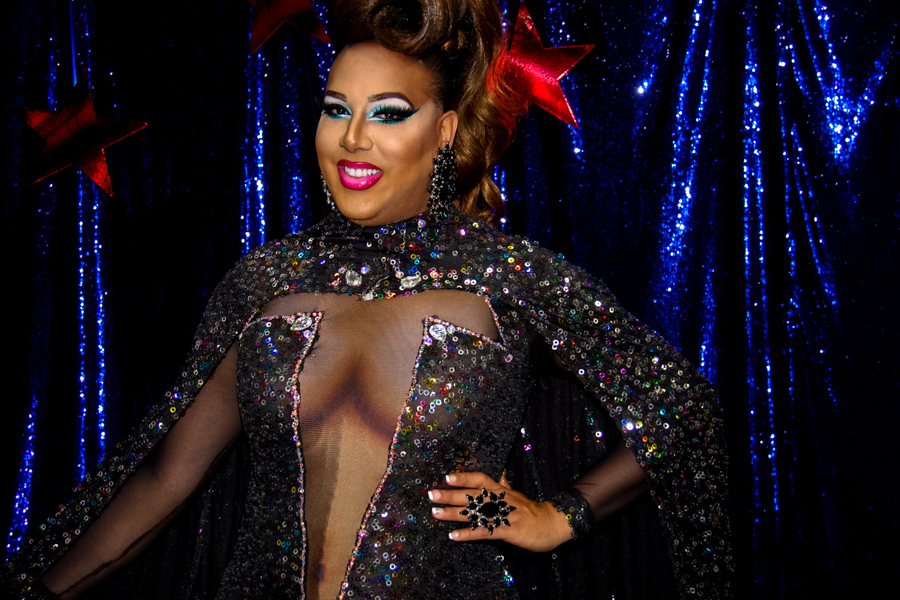
"Bam" is a joyous expression used by Alexis Mateo (pictured in 2018).

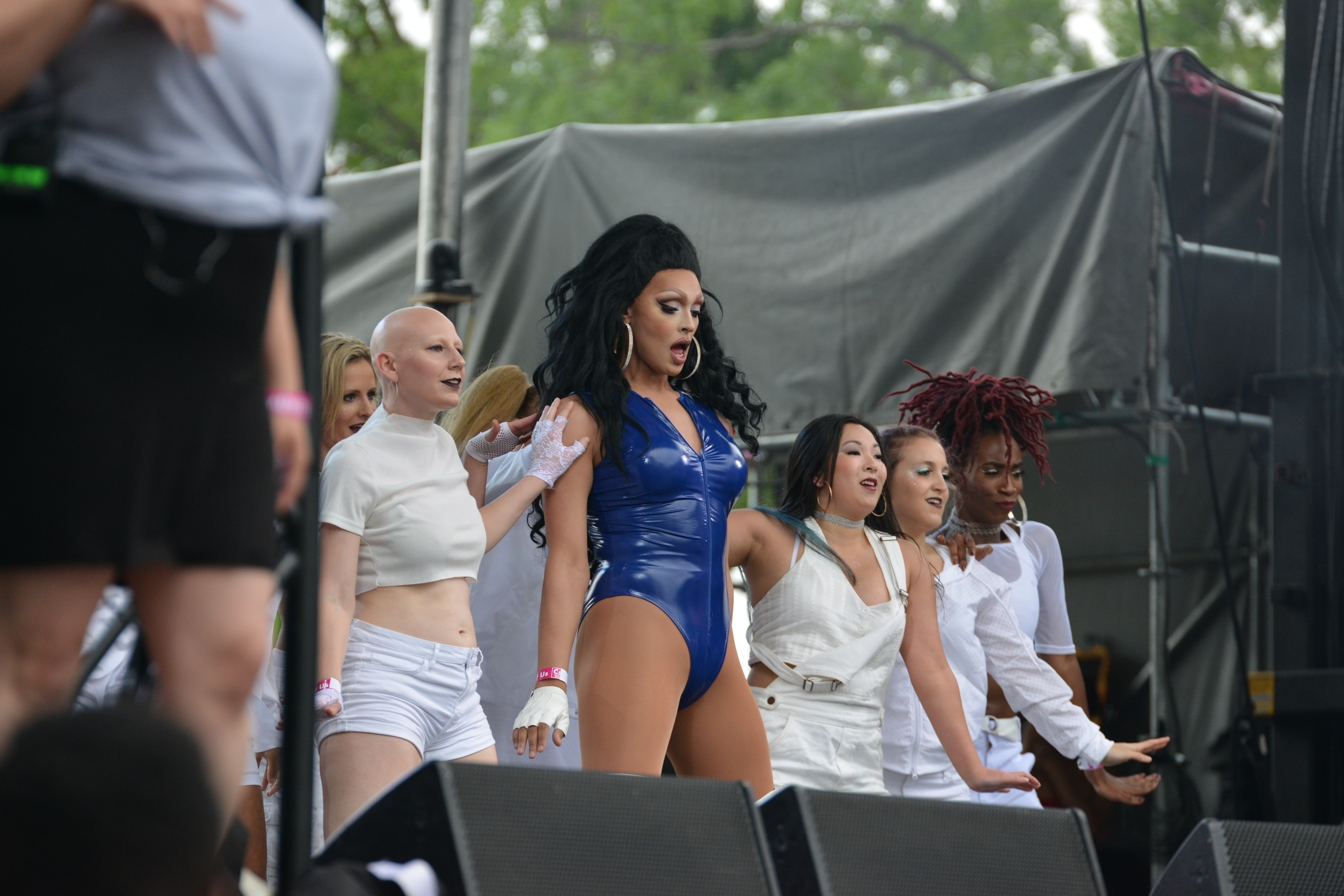
Tatianna (center) uses the catchphrase "choices".

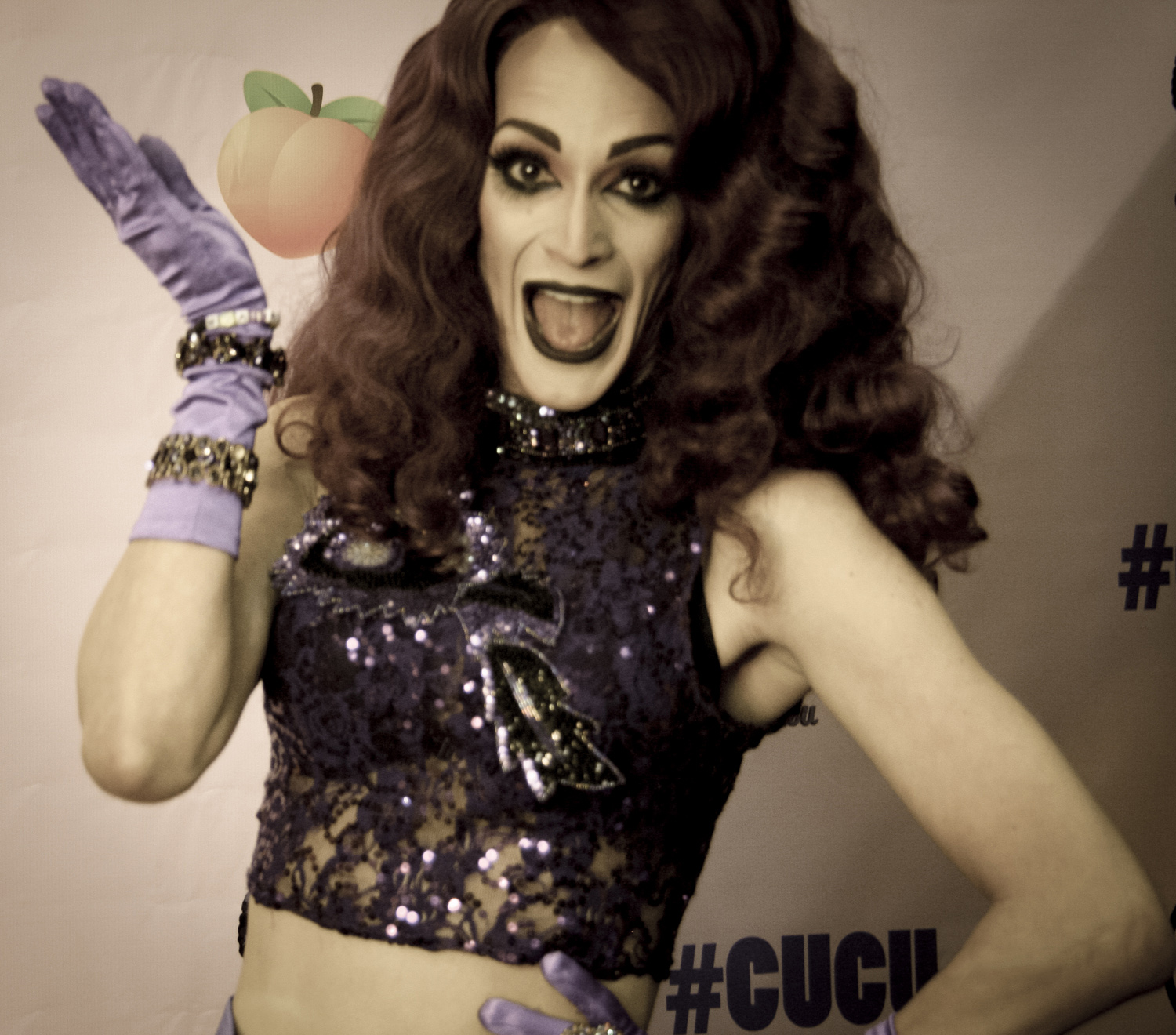
"Cucu" is Cynthia Lee Fontaine's name for the buttocks.

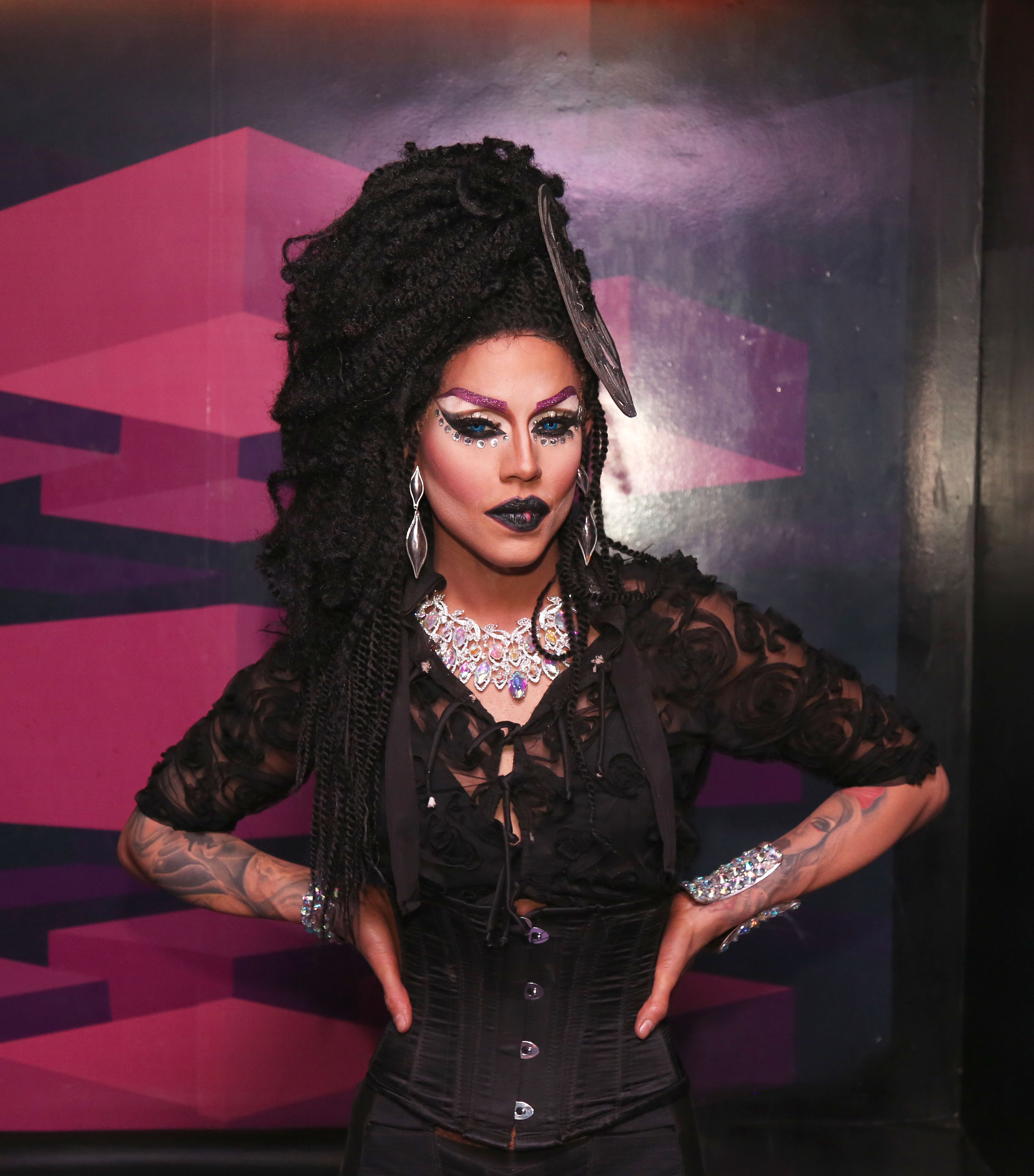
Yara Sofia (pictured in 2016) uses the catchphrase "echa pa lante", which translates to "go for it" in Spanish.

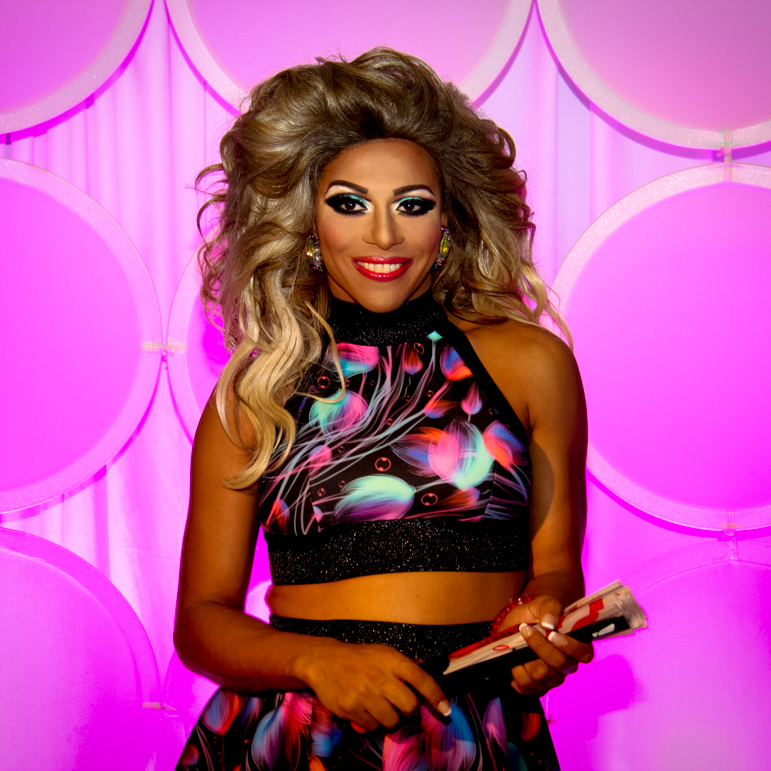
Shangela (pictured in 2017) uses the catchphrase "halleloo".

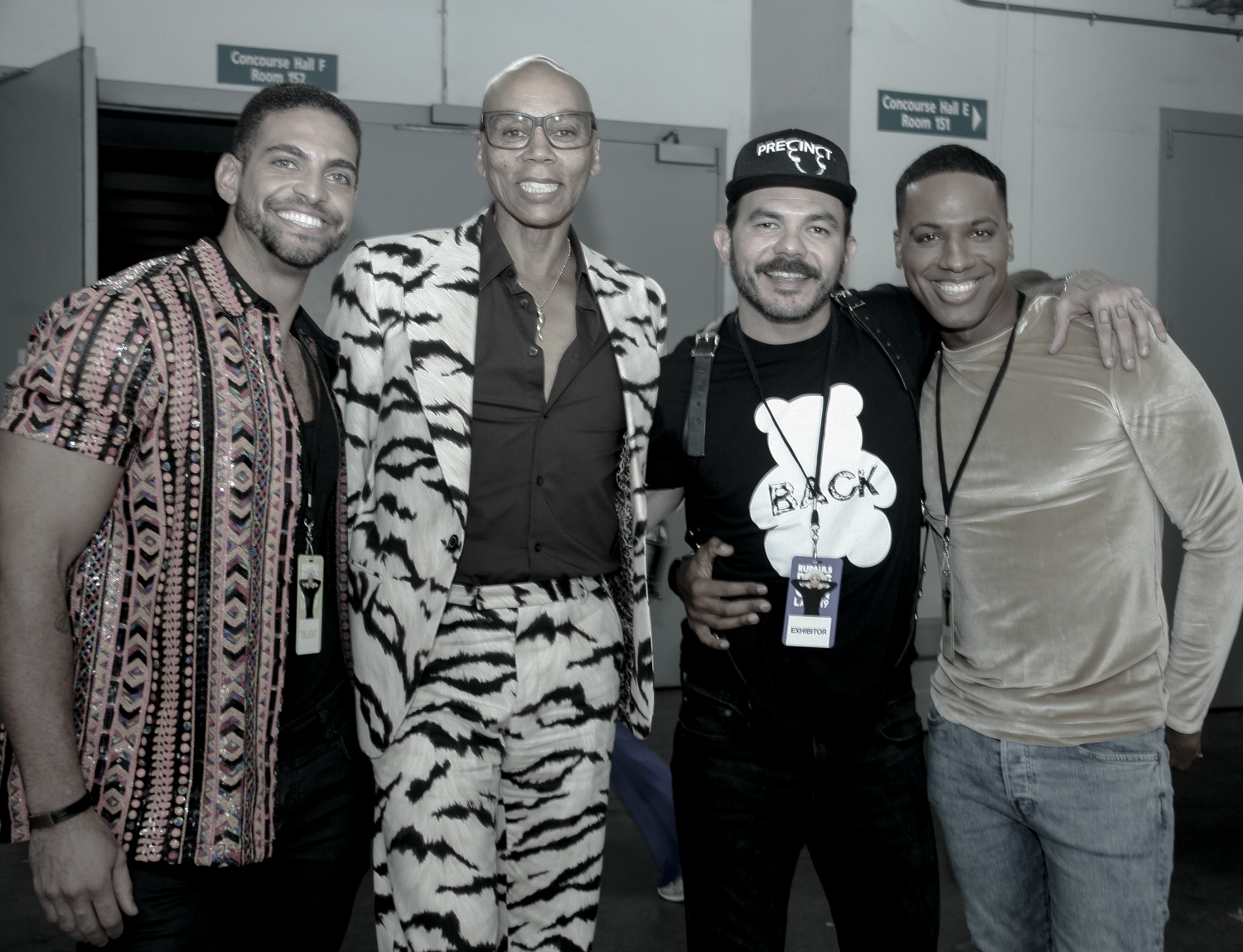
Pit Crew members with RuPaul (second from left), including Shawn Morales (second from right), in 2019

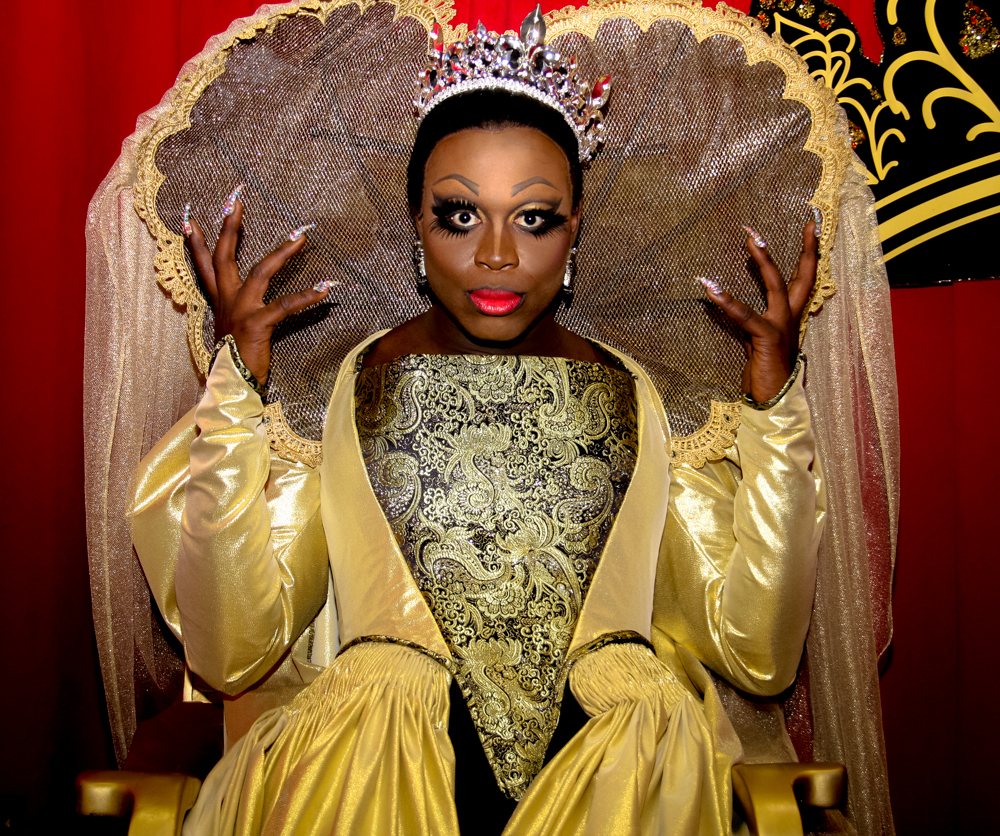
"Purse first" is a catchphrase used by Bob the Drag Queen, who later released a song by this name.

Slang terms used on the series have included:

RuPaul's Drag Race terminology
Term	Definition
American dream	
apolo-lie	a fake apology, coined by Widow Von'Du (season 12)
bam	a joyous expression used by Alexis Mateo (season 3; All Stars seasons 1 and 5), originally for season 3's "Life, Liberty & the Pursuit of Style" maxi challenge and later repeated by RuPaul
beat / beat one's face	to blend one's makeup, often with a sponge
best Judies / Judies	a gay man's gay best friend, usually platonically; the name of an All Stars season 4 makeover challenge
BGB / bye, girl, bye	term used when one queen is annoyed with another
big girl	a drag queen who wears plus-size clothing
body-ody-ody	an exclamation of when a drag queen with a feminine form shows off her figure
booger	a drag queen whose presentation is unpolished or messy, see: busted
break the dawn	to give all that one has to something
busted	being unpolished or messy
Bye, Felicia	a way of dismissing or shutting down another queen, or ending a conversation
chanté, you stay / shantay, you stay / shante, you stay	phrase used by RuPaul to declare then winner of a lip sync
charisma, uniqueness, nerve, and talent	euphemism for C.U.N.T, shown by the first letter of each word
chicken cutlets	gel inserts used to create cleavage
choices	a catchphrase used by Tatianna (season 2; All Stars season 2)
condragulations	drag wordplay for the word "congratulations"
cooking	allowing time for face powder to set
country realness	"authentic Southern style" and a season 2 runway category
cucu	Cynthia Lee Fontaine's (seasons 8 and 9) name for the buttocks
death drop	dance move where a queen dramatically falls back into a stroke pose, usually at the end of a lipsync or during a beat drop
drag mother / dragmother	an established drag queen who mentors a new queen, her "daughter"; many queens use the same last name as their drag mother, creating "family" lineages, sometimes called "houses"
eat it	a "confident expression" used by Latrice Royale (season 4; All Stars seasons 1 and 4) "when she is feeling fabulous... It essentially means that those around you must accept the fact that you're that great."
echa pa lante	a catchphrase translating to "go for it" in Spanish, used by Yara Sofia (season 3; All Stars season 1 and 6)
eleganza extravaganza / extravaganza eleganza	something possessing extreme elegance; sometimes a runway category
family	a group of queens who have been mentored by a drag "mother"; the group may also be referred to as a "house"
fierce	extremely well put together, well-performed, fashionable, beautiful; high praise. "Her make-up looked fierce." "Her lip sync performance was fierce."
fish / fishy	a term used to describe when a drag queen looks like a cisgender woman
gag / gagging	another term used in place of "stunned"
garage doors	one solid color of eyeshadow heavily applied over the entire lid and up to the eyebrow
girl / gurl	nickname for a drag queen from a fellow queen
go Mary-Kate	to wear multiple layers of clothing, in the style of Mary-Kate Olsen
halleloo	an expression of joy or praise used by Shangela (seasons 2 and 3; All Stars season 3) as another way of saying "hallelujah"; the phrase is "impossible to forget" and "without question, the first legitimate catch phrase that came out of this franchise", according to Screen Rant's Bernardo Sim
heather	"a conventionally pretty drag queen and member of the 'popular' clique", from the film Heathers
henny	an alternate pronunciation of "honey" and a catchphrase popularized by Stacy Layne Matthews (season 3), who returned for the All Stars season 4 episode "Super Girl Groups, Henny!"
hieeee	catchphrase popularized by Alaska Thunderfuck (season 5; All Stars season 2), sometimes said high-pitched; later used by other contestants, as well as RuPaul and Michelle Visage on most episodes of the podcast What's the Tea?
house	a group of drag queens who were all mentored by the same "mother"
hunty	a term of endearment, may be a portmanteau of "honey" and "cunty"
kai kai	a sexual or romantic relationship between two drag queens
ki ki / kiki	a gathering of friends, possibly for the purpose of gossipping (not to be confused with kai kai)
ladyboy	a synonym for a drag queen, and a song by RuPaul performed by season 2 contestants
leotarded	wearing a bodysuit
library	name of a group act in which queens verbally insult (or "read") each other about their acts, looks or personas, usually meant in jest
lip sync for your life	a lip-syncing challenge between an episode's bottom two queens, in which the loser is eliminated from the competition
Meryl Streep realness	serious acting, instead of going big during a performance, you act more reserved
Miss Vanjie	a catchphrase made "instantly famous" by Vanessa Vanjie Mateo (seasons 10 and 11) when she repeated the phrase three times while walking backward during her season 10 sashay away; according to Screen Rant, the catchphrase is "one of the most memorable" in the show's history and how some fans refer to Vanessa Vanjie Mateo
okurrr	a positive expression, derivative of "okay"
party	Adore Delano's (season 6; All Stars season 2) catchphrase used "as a reaction to something that was said, and can mean a myriad of things depending on the context"
piggy	Someone who is “constantly eating”, or consistently performing well. Coined by Jewels Sparkles in Season 17.
Pit Crew	ensemble of male models, often wearing revealing clothing (not in drag) who appear on camera for various segments
PMP	an acronym standing for "Post Modern Pimp-Ho"
purse first	catchphrase used by Bob the Drag Queen (season 8), who later released a song by this title
read / reading	verbally insulting another queen about their acts, looks, or persona, often in jest; the act of several queens taking turns to share insults is called a "library"
realness	authenticity, accuracy; embodiment of the truest version of something
resting on pretty	using your looks to move forward in the competition instead of being a well-rounded queen who can act, dance, do comedy, etc.
sashay away	phrase used by RuPaul when eliminating a queen
serve	presenting a specific concept or idea
sexcretary	a "sexy-looking" secretary
shade	an insult or negative comment; may be said behind one's back
she done already done had herses	a phrase popularized by RuPaul, referring to a time when RuPaul was at a restaurant in the pick-up line and somebody tried to take food that did not belong to her. The woman told the patron, "She done already done had herses." RuPaul adopted the phrase and uses it frequently, usually when "she-mail" comes on the screen for the contestants to see a video message
she owns everything	to be "the one true queen" or "the most fabulous", according to Marie Claire
sickening	used to refer to a queen who is exceptionally “amazing” or “flawless”
sissy that walk	walk confidently, usually down the runway; walk like a woman
Snatch Game	a challenge in which contestants showcase their best celebrity impersonations in a game show setting; Snatch Game is a parody of the classic television show Match Game (1962–1991), where contestants attempted to match celebrities' answers to "fill-in-the-blank" questions
snatched	small-waisted, or otherwise attractive and on-point
Soul Train realness	refers to the embodiment and expression of the unique style, energy, and authenticity associated with the dancers on the iconic television show "Soul Train," often referenced in voguing and ballroom culture
spilling the tea	sharing gossip
sprepper	a combination of Sprite and Dr. Pepper as explained by Carmen Carerra: It's not necessarily a bad thing but it isn't a good thing either; mediocre
T / tea / tee	gossip, juicy news
throw shade / throwing shade	to insult
tuck	noun: the illusion of a feminine crotch line; verb: the act of positioning one's penis and testicles back and up into the body to create a feminine silhouette of the crotch area
two piece and a biscuit	a Popeyes meal option and Mystique's (season 2) "secret to success"
werk / work	to own it on the runway
who-ho	a "ho" dressed like a Who from Dr. Seuss's fictional town of Whoville
yas / yas, queen!	derivative of "yes"; used to agree with or encourage something or someone

== See also ==
- LGBT slang
- List of LGBT slang terms
