= Queens in Space =

- RuPaul's Drag Race episode
- Episode no.: Season 3 Episode 3
- Directed by: Nick Murray
- Presented by: RuPaul
- Original air date: January 31, 2011

Guest appearances
- Lily Tomlin; Alessandra Torresani

"Queens in Space" is the third episode of the third season of the American television series RuPaul's Drag Race. It originally aired on January 31, 2011. The episode's main challenge tasks the contestants with acting in science fiction film trailers. Lily Tomlin and Alessandra Torresani are guest judges. Alexis Mateo and Shangela are both winners of the main challenge. Phoenix is eliminated from the competition after placing in the bottom and losing a lip-sync contest against Delta Work to "Bad Romance" (2009) by Lady Gaga. "Queens in Space" was followed by an episode of the companion series RuPaul's Drag Race: Untucked, which includes a fight between Mimi Imfurst and Shangela.

== Episode ==
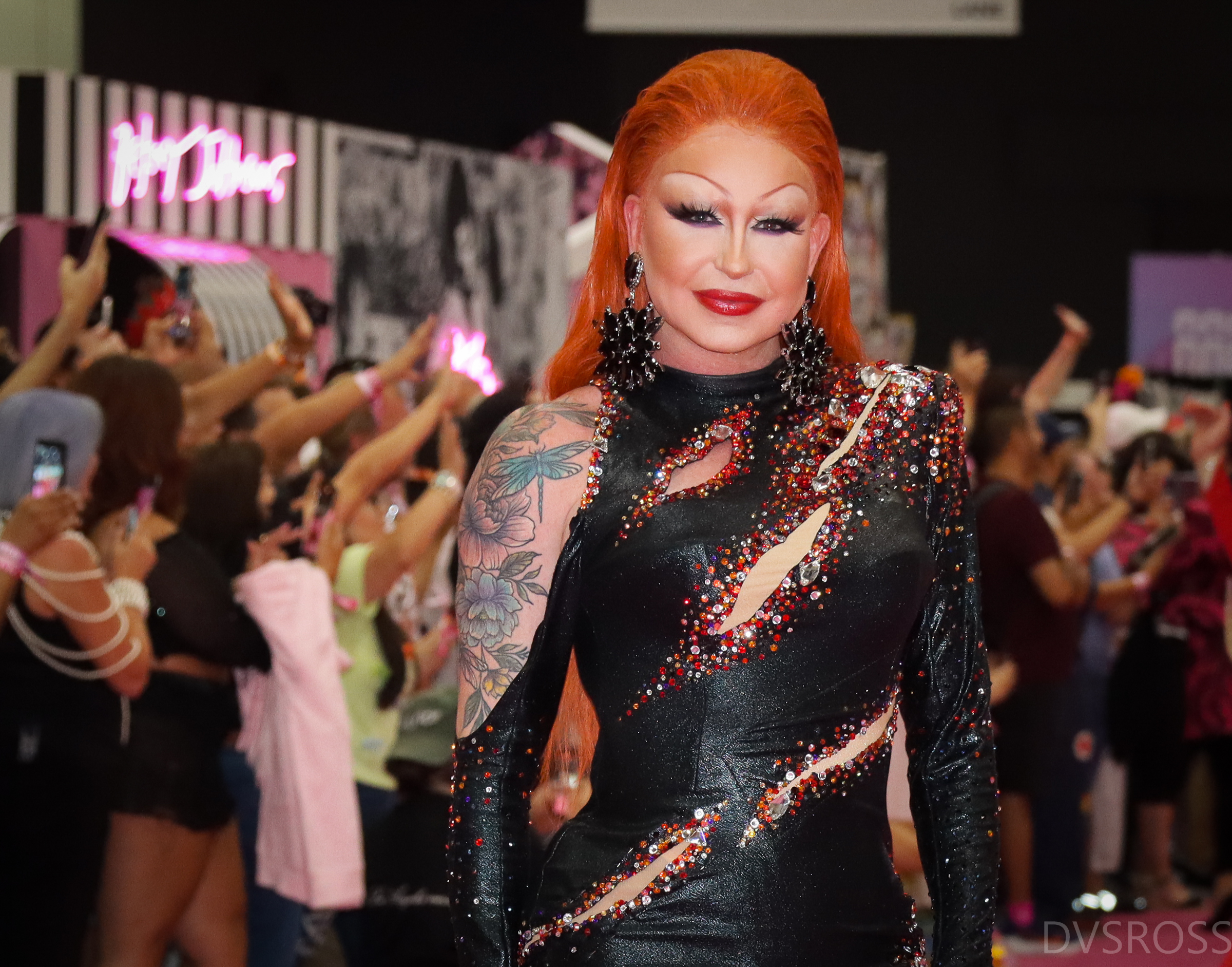
Phoenix (pictured at RuPaul's DragCon LA in 2024) is eliminated from the competition.

For the mini-challenge, the contestants are tasked with pairing up and trying to guess their partner's choices for different questions. Mariah and Phoenix win the mini-challenge and are named team leaders. They must choose teammates for the main challenge, which tasks the contestants with starring in trailers for two different installments of the Drag Queens in Outer Space science fiction spoof film saga. Team Mariah (Alexis Mateo, Mariah, Mimi Imfurst, Shangela, Stacy Layne Matthews, and Yara Sofia) star in Drag Queens in Outer Space: Return to Uranus. Team Phoenix (Carmen Carrera, Delta Work, India Ferrah, Manila Luzon, Phoenix, and Raja) star in Drag Queens in Outer Space: From Earth to Uranus.

Lily Tomlin and Alessandra Torresani are guest judges. The runway category is "Sci-Fi". After the contestants present their looks, the judges deliver their critiques, deliberate, then share the results with the group. Team Mariah is the winning team, and Alexis Mateo and Shangela are both declared winners of the challenge. Team Phoenix is the losing team. Carmen Carrera, Delta Work and Phoenix receive negative critiques, and Carmen Carrera is deemed safe. Delta Work and Phoenix face off in a lip-sync contest to "Bad Romance" (2009) by Lady Gaga. Delta Work wins the lip-sync and Phoenix is eliminated from the competition.

== Production and broadcast ==
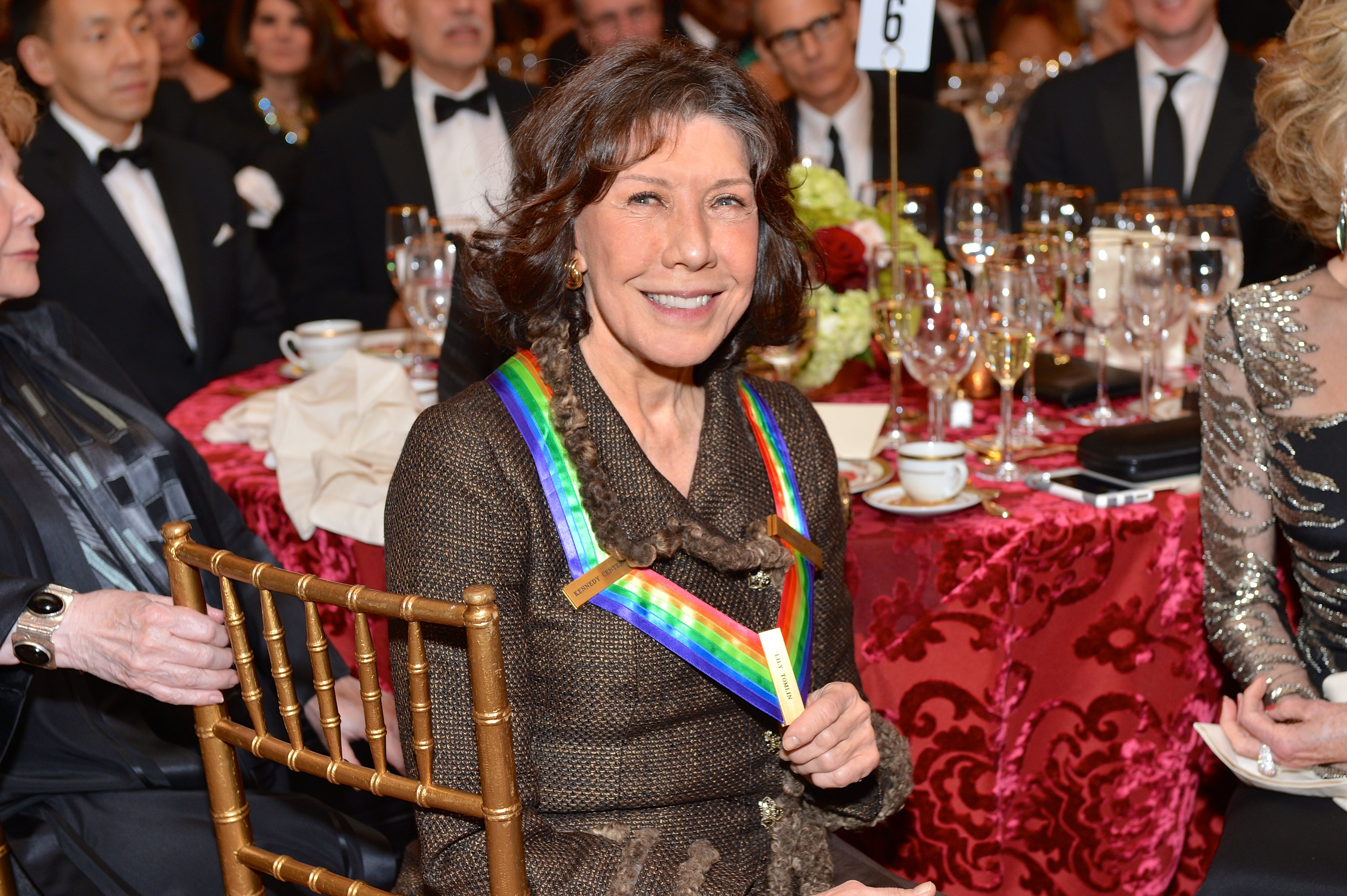
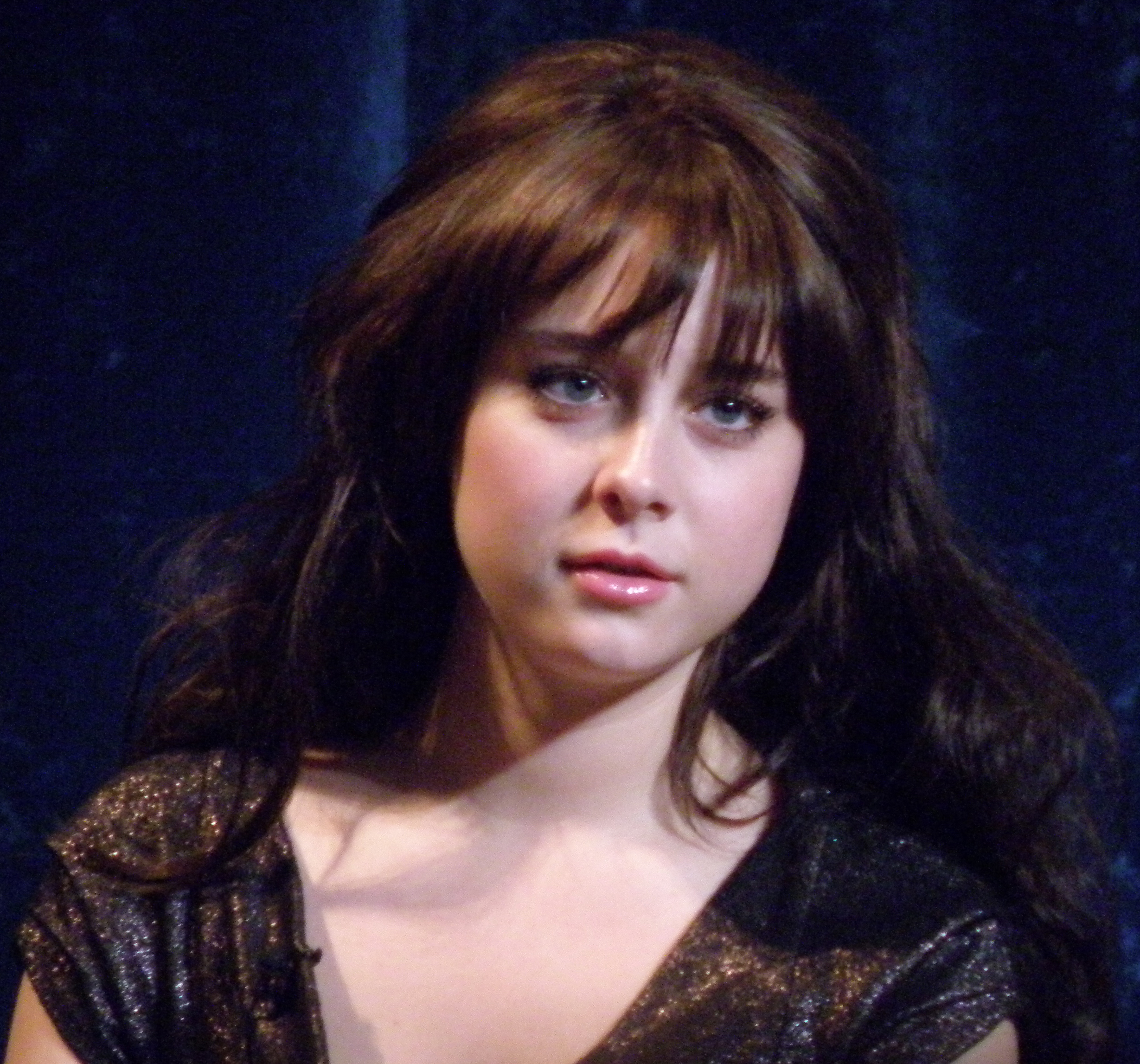
Lily Tomlin (top, pictured in 2014) and Alessandra Torresani (bottom, pictured in 2009) are guest judges.

The episode was directed by Nick Murray and originally aired on January 31, 2011.

Bustle said the episode sees the contestants act in "double-entendre-laden sci-fi scenes to a fair number of laughs and snaps". In 2014, the website's Anneliese Cooper said of the episode: "It's Ziggy Stardust meets shiny chrome futurism topped with shellacked, asymmetrical 'dos — high camp strutting through a jumble of B-movie schmaltz."

The show was followed by an episode of the companion series RuPaul's Drag Race: Untucked. During Untucked, Mimi Imfurst "provoked" Shangela to say her "I don't have a sugar daddy" speech, according to Pride.com. Shangela says, "I don't have a sugar daddy. I've never had a sugar daddy. If I wanted a sugar daddy, yes, I could probably go out and get one, because I am what? Sickening! You could never have a sugar daddy, because you are not-that-kind-of-girl! Bitch!" Both contestants throw their drinks at the other. The fight received over a million views by 2019. Alexis Mateo discussed the fight with Jonny McGovern on Hey Qween! in 2019.

=== Fashion ===
For the runway, Yara Sofia wears a replica of the final outfit from the Alexander McQueen collection Plato's Atlantis and a blonde wig. Raja's outfit is gold. India Ferrah has a white outfit and blonde hair. Alexis Mateo has a red outfit with a cape. Stacy Layne Mathews has a silver bodysuit. Shangela's outfit is also red. Mimi Imfurst, Phoenix, and Carmen Carrera wear headpieces. Mariah's outfit is black-and-white. Delta Work wears a blonde wig. Manila Luzon's outfit is black-and-yellow.

Delta Work's outfit was "co-opted from her performances" with the Dreamgirls Revue, according to Paper magazine.

== Reception and legacy ==
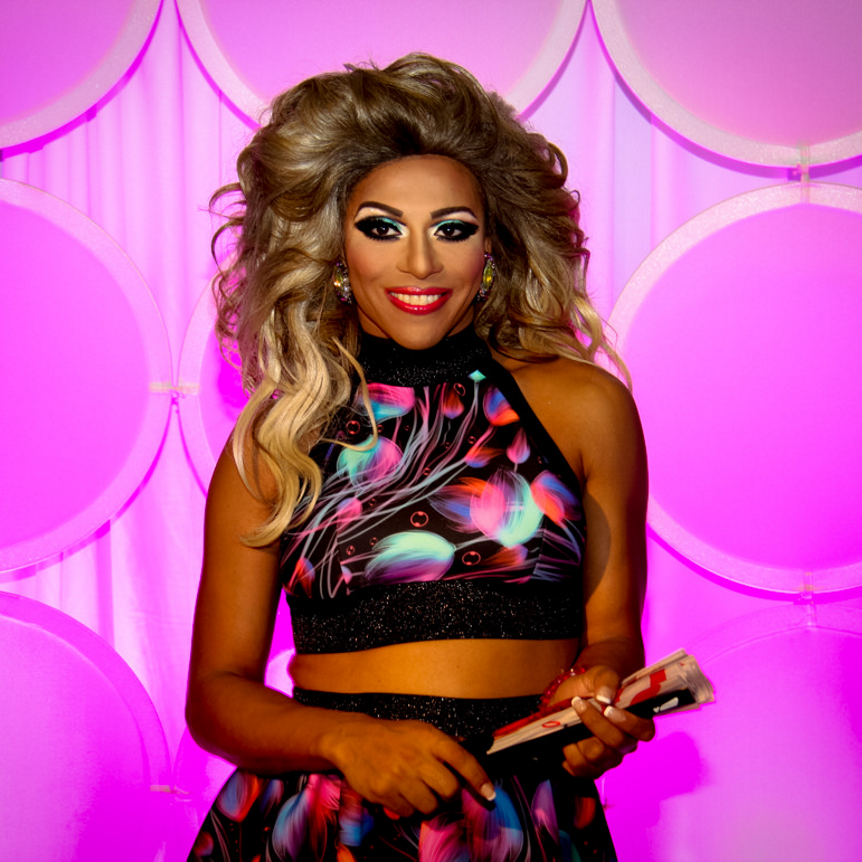
On the corresponding episode of RuPaul's Drag Race: Untucked, Shangela (pictured at RuPaul's DragCon LA in 2017) delivers her "sugar daddy" speech.

In 2017, Kyle Munzenrieder of W magazine said the main challenge "remains an all-time classic". Kevin O'Keeffe ranked the "Bad Romance" performance number 97 in INTO Magazine's 2018 "definitive ranking" of the show's lip-sync contests to date. Sam Brooks ranked the contest number 144 in The Spinoff's 2019 "definitive ranking" of the show's 162 lip-syncs to date. In 2024, Joan Summers of Paper said Delta Work's performance "remains a favorite across iterations of the show" and noted, "she's critical of the space-themed outfit now".

=== Untucked fight ===
Michael Cuby included the fight between Mimi Imfurst and Shangela on Untucked in Them magazine's 2018 list of the ten "messiest" fights in the spin-off's history. In 2018, Stephen Daw included Shangela's speech in Billboard's list of the ten "best reads" in Drag Race history, and IN Magazine said her speech was "the moment that really cemented Shangela in Drag Race herstory". Brett White included the fight in Decider's 2021 list of the ten "most shocking gags" in Drag Race history. In a 2021 article about Untucked, Joey Nolfi of Entertainment Weekly wrote, "Can you imagine Drag Race culture without Shangela's alleged sugar daddy?" Justin Smith included the fight in Screen Rant's 2021 list of the ten "most unforgettable Untucked moments". The website's Moon Abbott included Shangela's line "I don't have a sugar daddy" in 2021 list of her nine best quotes. Katcy Stephan called Shangela's speech "iconic" in Variety's 2023 list of the "most iconic moments" in Drag Race history. Bernardo Sim included the right in Out magazine's 2023 list of the show's 25 "most iconic and gag-worthy moments".

Aquaria recited part of Shangela's "sugar daddy" speech on an episode of the show's tenth season (2018). Loosey LaDuca and Luxx Noir London reference Shangela's speech on the show's fifteenth season (2023).
