= The Snatch Game (RuPaul's Drag Race season 3) =

- RuPaul's Drag Race episode
- Episode no.: Season 3 Episode 6
- Presented by: RuPaul

Guest appearances
- Amber Rose; Aisha Tyler

Episode chronology
- RuPaul's Drag Race season 3

"The Snatch Game" is the sixth episode of the third season of the American television series RuPaul's Drag Race. It originally aired on February 21, 2011. The episode's main challenge has contestants play Snatch Game. Aisha Tyler and Amber Rose are special guests.Stacy Layne Matthews wins the main challenge for her impersonation of Mo'Nique. Mariah is eliminated from the completion after placing in the bottom and losing a lip-sync contest against Delta Work to "Looking for a New Love" (1987) by Jody Watley.

== Episode ==
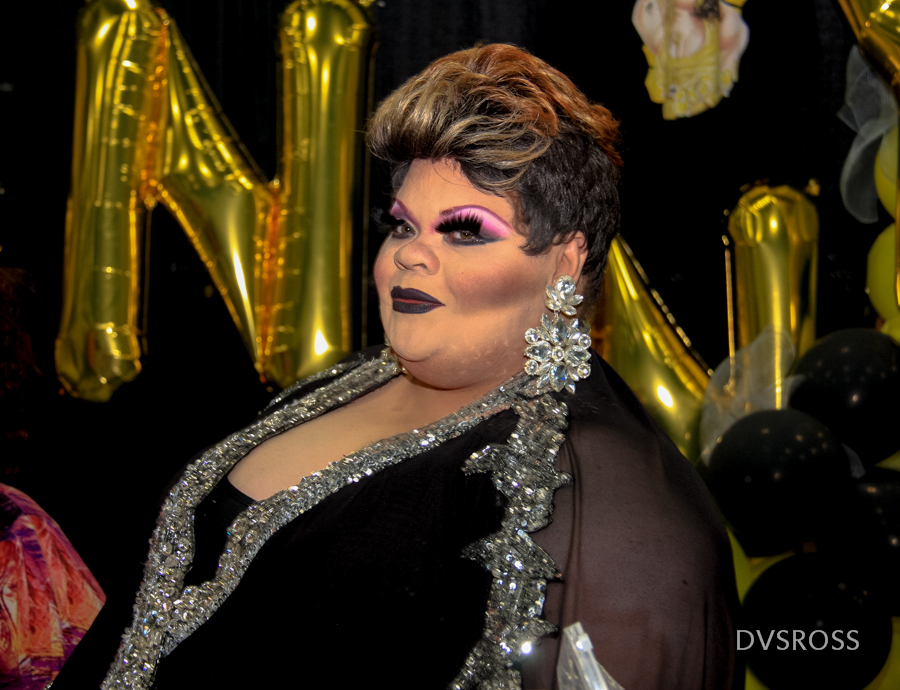
Stacy Layne Matthews (pictured in 2018) wins the episode's main challenge.

The contestants enter the workroom and read the message left on the mirror by India Ferrah. RuPaul greets the group and reveals the mini-challenge, which tasks the contestants with playing a game of "Shit RuPaul Says". Phrases include "two piece and a biscuit", "elegant extravaganza', 'available on iTunes', and 'she done already done had herses'. Delta Work wins the mini-challenge, earning her a phone call to a loved one back home.

RuPaul then reveals the main challenge, which tasks the contestants with impersonating celebrities during Snatch Game. Instead of making a phone call home herself, Delta Work lets Shangela use the prize. The contestants start to get into drag. RuPaul returns to the workroom to meet with each contestant, asking questions and offering advice. Before leaving, RuPaul shares that Amber Rose and Aisha Tyler are the celebrity guests and judges.

Mariah (pictured at RuPaul's DragCon LA in 2018) is eliminated from the competition.

After RuPaul leaves, Stacy Layne Matthews vents to Shangela about the feedback she received from RuPaul. Shangela encourages her to follow RuPaul's advice, prompting Stacy Layne Matthews to change her character. The Snatch Game commences, with RuPaul as the host and as guests. Following are the contestants and impersonated celebrities:

- Alexis Mateo as Alicia Keys
- Carmen Carrera as Jennifer Lopez
- Delta Work as Cher
- Manila Luzon as Imelda Marcos
- Mariah as Joan Crawford
- Raja as Tyra Banks
- Shangela as Tina Turner
- Stacy Layne Matthews as Mo'Nique
- Yara Sofia as Amy Winehouse

On elimination day, Stacy Layne Matthews shares about her relationship with her father to Shangela. Mariah shares about her upbringing. On the main stage, RuPaul welcomes fellow judges Michelle Visage and Santino Rice, as well as the guest judges. RuPaul shares the assignment of the main challenge and the runway category ("Best Drag"), then the fashion show commences. After the contestants present their looks, the judges deliver their critiques, deliberate, then share the results with the group. Stacy Layne Matthews is declared the winner of the main challenge. Delta Work and Mariah place in the bottom and face off in a lip-sync contest to "Looking for a New Love" (1987) by Jody Watley. Delta Work wins the lip-sync and Mariah is eliminated from the competition. Mariah returns to the workroom and uses lipstick to write a message on the mirror for the remaining contestants.

== Production and broadcast ==
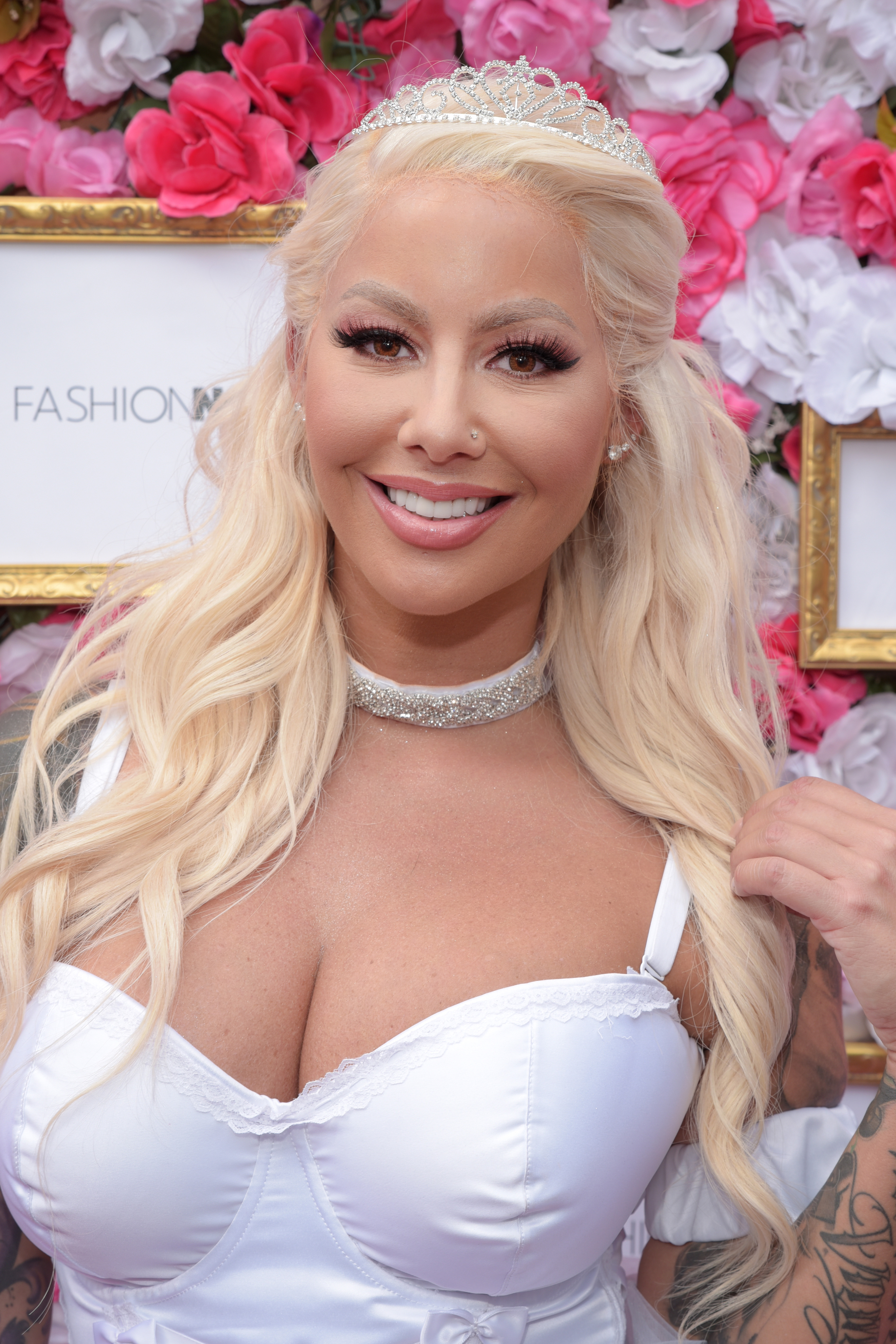
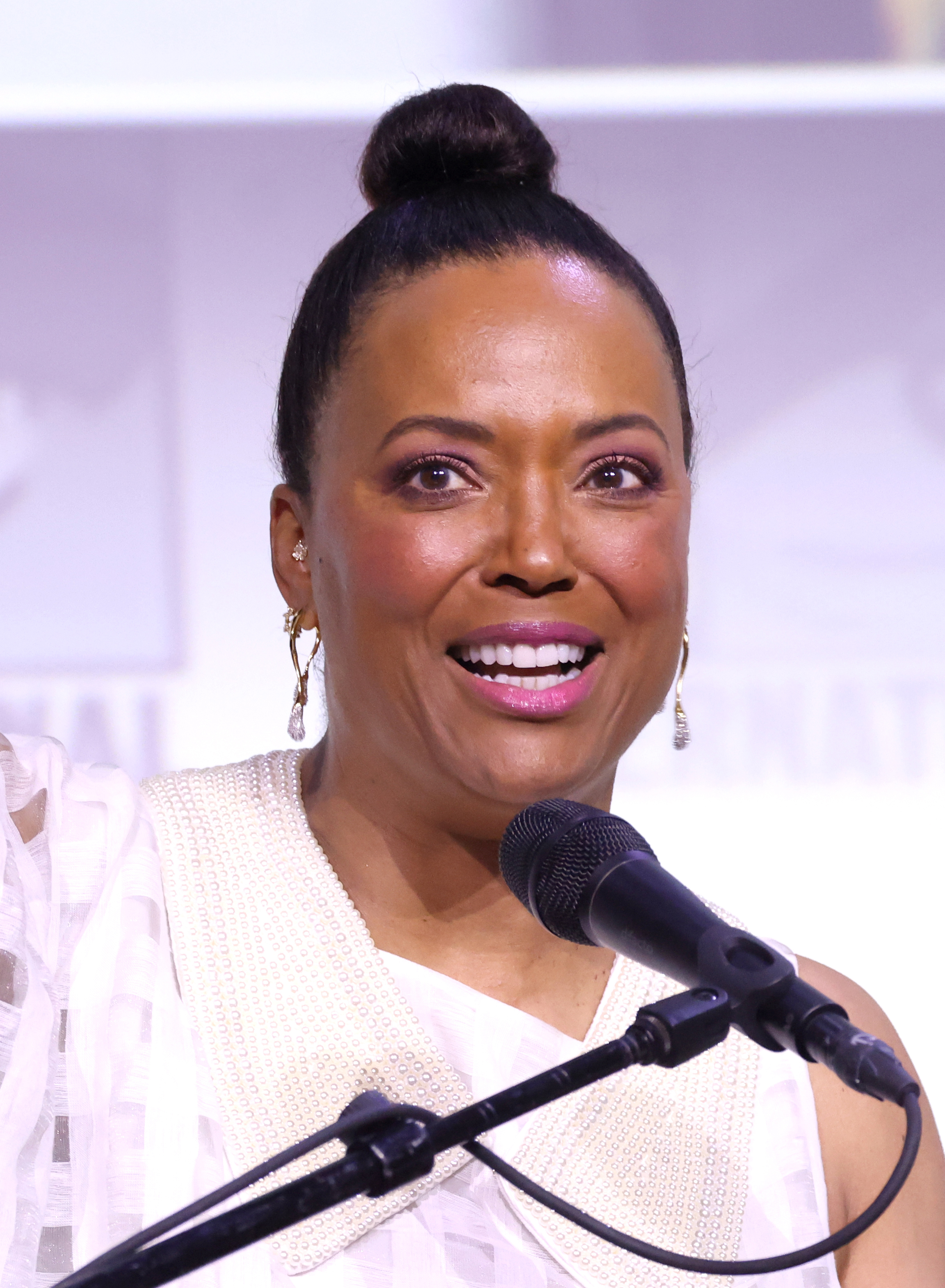
Amber Rose (left, pictured in 2018) and Aisha Tyler (right, pictured in 2025) are guest judges.

The episode originally aired on February 21, 2011. Shawn Morales is among members of the Pit Crew.

=== Fashion ===
In the workroom, RuPaul wears a pink suit and a yellow dress shirt. On the main stage, RuPaul wears a purple dress.

Yara Sofia wears a black dress and blonde dreadlocks. Shangla has a cream-colored gown and a hat with hair. Mariah wears a short black dress, matching high-heeled shoes, and a dark wig. Raja has a colorful skirt, rings around her neck, and a short dark wig. Alexis Mateo wears a red dress and a long dark wig. Carmen Carrera has a black-and-red outfit with matching shoes and a brown wig. Stacy Layne Matthews wears a black-and-gold outfit. Delta Work has a purple pantsuit and a red wig. Manila Luzon's outfit has blue, red, and white dress inspired by the flag of the Philippines.

== Reception ==
Tanner Stransky of Entertainment Weekly wrote, "Last night's episode was insane and beautiful and offensive because one of the most questionable contestants in Drag Race history — yes, I'm talking about SLM! — made it so by perfectly doing a drag impersonation of Mo’Nique circa Mary, the actresses' character from 2009’s Oscar-winning movie Precious."
