= The Hound (singer) =

- Birth name: John Robert Constantine
- Born: September 3, 1986 (age 38)
- Genres: Electropop
- Occupations: Singer; songwriter; record producer
- Instruments: Vocals; guitar; keyboards
- Years active: 2009–present
- Website: thehoundmusic.com

John Robert Constantine (born September 3, 1986), known professionally as The Hound is a Los Angeles based singer, songwriter, and record producer.

== Early life ==
Constantine was born in Los Angeles and was raised by his mother in the suburb of Santa Clarita. He studied voice and guitar at a young age and attended the Los Angeles County High School for the Arts, one of the top 5 art high schools in the U.S. studying voice, composition, and opera. While many of his peers went on to conservatory, Constantine went to Musicians Institute for Music Business, Audio Engineering and Production.

== Career ==
=== Orchid and Hound ===
After college, Constantine moved to San Francisco with his boyfriend Lawrence Alarcon. After their relationship ended, they formed the band Orchid and Hound in 2009, releasing two studio albums and an E.P., and played at South by Southwest in 2012 with One Little Indian Records. SF Weekly described their music as "bouncy piano melodies over somber lyrics that focus mainly on relationships. One barely notices that the lyrical content expresses a dour mood, as the music does just the opposite."

=== Can't Let You Go ===
Constantine moved to Downtown Los Angeles, and on August 4, 2017, released the single "Can't Let You Go," as The Hound. The electronic pop song was written, produced, and recorded by The Hound. It had a positive reception, with Paris Close of Billboard calling it a "hot blooded hit," alongside other musicians from the LGBTQ community. The video was directed by Adrian Anchondo and stars gay pornstar Adam Ramzi. The video portrays Ramzi and The Hound as boyfriends who have broken up and is told through choreography by Andrew Pearson. The video was called "unashamedly queer and sensual" by Kevin James Thornton in Huffington Post.
