= Stacy Layne Matthews =

American drag performer

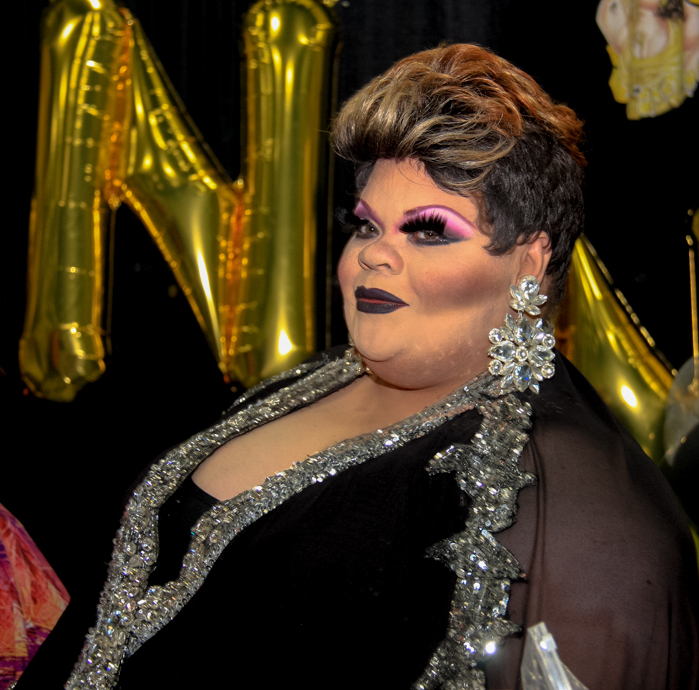
- Stacy Layne Matthews at RuPaul's DragCon LA, 2018
- Born: Back Swamp, North Carolina, U.S.
- Other name: Stacy Jones
- Education: University of North Carolina at Pembroke
- Occupation: Drag queen
- Television: RuPaul's Drag Race (season 3)

Stacy Layne Matthews is the stage name of Stacy Jones, a drag performer who competed on the third season of RuPaul's Drag Race. On the show, she popularized the word "henny", which became a nickname, and she won the Snatch Game challenge for her impersonation of Mo'Nique. Following Drag Race, Stacy Layne Matthews impersonated Mo'Nique in The HoMo'Nique Show, a parody of BET's The Mo'Nique Show, at Manhattan's Laurie Beechman Theater. She has also appeared on the fourth season of RuPaul's Drag Race All Stars and Teen Mom OG.

Originally from Back Swamp, North Carolina, Jones is a member of the Lumbee Tribe of North Carolina.

== Early life and education ==
Stacy Jones is originally from Back Swamp, North Carolina. She attended the University of North Carolina at Pembroke. Her first experience in drag was for a Halloween contest as a student at the university, which she won.

== Career ==
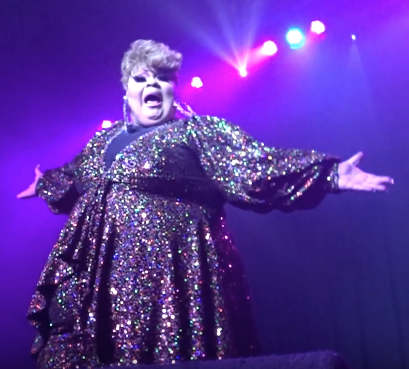
Stacy Layne Matthews in 2018

Jones competed as Stacy Layne Matthews on the third season of the reality competition television series RuPaul's Drag Race, which aired in 2011. She popularized the word "henny", which became a nickname, and placed eighth overall after ranking in the bottom two twice. Stacy Layne Matthews won the Snatch Game challenge on the sixth episode for her impersonation of Mo'Nique as her character in the film Precious (2009), and eliminated India Ferrah from the competition after winning a lip-sync contest to "Meeting in the Ladies Room" (1985) by Klymaxx. Stacy Layne Matthews was eliminated on the seventh episode, after placing in the bottom two of the design challenge, and losing a lip-sync contest against Alexis Mateo.

Stacy Layne Matthews is referenced in the song "Heather", a parody of Mariah Carey's "We Belong Together" (2005), by The AAA Girls, a supergroup with Drag Race contestants Alaska Thunderfuck, Courtney Act, and Willam Belli. "Heather" was released as a single for Access All Areas in 2017 and received a music video, in which Stacy Layne Matthews made a cameo appearance. Stacy Layne Matthews made multiple appearances on the fourth season (2018–2019) of the spin-off series RuPaul's Drag Race All Stars, during the "Super Girl Groups, Henny" musical theatre challenge, the "Jersey Justice" episode in which she played a court reporter, as well as the comedy roast challenge.

Sam Damshenas of Gay Times has said Stacy Layne Matthews is "one of the most beloved" contestants in the Drag Race franchise. Instinct magazine and other publications have described her as a "fan favorite". The "Meeting in the Ladies Room" battle was included in Out's 2018 list of twelve lip-syncs "that define [the show's] queer canon", and Pride.com's 2019 list of the seven closest lip-syncs in the show's history. In a 2019 list of Drag Race's most memorable catchphrases, Bernardo Sim of Screen Rant wrote, "It's fair to say that 'henny' has surpassed its Drag Race fame and entered the vocabulary of mainstream media. Overall, it is not rare to hear other celebrities saying 'henny' as an alternative pronunciation of 'honey,' perhaps without even necessarily being familiar with Stacy Layne Matthews." Hugh McIntyre ranked her impersonation of Mo'Nique eighteenth in Bustle's 2022 list of the show's best Snatch Game performances.

Following Drag Race, Stacy Layne Matthews took her impersonation of Mo'Nique to Manhattan's Laurie Beechman Theater with a three-day run of The HoMo'Nique Show, a parody of BET's The Mo'Nique Show, and interviewed guests included Randy Jones, Amanda Lepore, and Michael Musto. Stacy Layne Matthews also appeared on Teen Mom OG in 2018. She temporarily retired from drag in November 2023, citing mental health reasons, but announced her return to drag in January 2024 via an Instagram post.

== Personal life ==
Jones has called herself a "country queen". She is a member of the federally-recognized Lumbee Tribe of North Carolina. Jones came out as a trans woman following her appearance on Drag Race. Mo'Nique is among inspirations for her look and style. During the COVID-19 pandemic, Jones experienced financial and housing difficulties. She faced eviction and sought treatment for a health condition in 2021. She was hospitalized in 2023 and 2024.

== Filmography ==
=== Television ===
Year	Title	Role	Notes	Ref.
2011	RuPaul's Drag Race (season 3)	Herself/Contestant	8th place	
2018	Teen Mom OG (season 7)	Herself	Cameo	
2018	RuPaul's Drag Race All Stars (season 4)	Herself	Special guest	

== See also ==
- List of Lumbees
