= Shawn Morales =

American actor and model

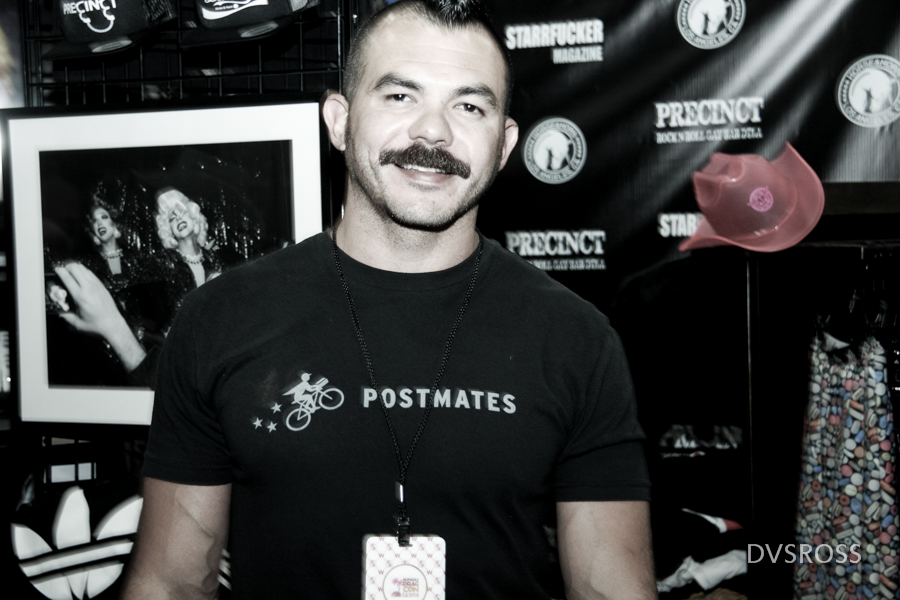
- Born: July 21, 1978 (age 48); Santa Monica, California
- Occupations: Model; Actor; Television Personality
- Years active: 2011–present
- Known for: RuPaul's Drag Race; RuPaul's Drag Race All Stars
- Spouse: Levi Packer (m. 2020)

Shawn Morales (born July 21, 1978) is an American model, actor, and nightlife personality based in Los Angeles, California.

== RuPaul's Drag Race ==
In 2011, while working as a gogo dancer at local gay bars, Shawn auditioned for the RuPaul's Drag Race "Pit Crew" (also known as the Scruff Pit Crew). They are a group of men who appear on each season of Drag Race. The men of the Pit Crew are typically dressed only in their underwear, assisting RuPaul and contestants in various challenges on the reality show. They usually have no dialogue on the show, mainly appearing as "eye candy" for viewers and contestants. Morales became the first non-African-American man to join the Pit Crew, joining in season three. He would also go on to appear in RuPaul's music video for the song "Champion." Morales remained with the show until he was axed before Season 7 began. No reason ever was given for Morales' departure from the show, but after a well-circulated Huffington Post article about Gold's Gym revoking Morales' gym membership due to his body odor, rumors swirled that there may have been a link between the two. Morales reprised his role in Season 10, as well as guest appearances on other RuPaul's Drag Race and their production company, World of Wonder's companion shows.

== Personal life ==
On November 5, 2020, Morales married his husband Levi Packer in Brownwood, Texas.

== Filmography ==
Television

Year	Title	Role	Notes	Ref.
2011	RuPaul's Drag Race	Himself (Pit Crew)	Season 3	
2012	RuPaul's Drag Race All Stars	Himself (Pit Crew)	Season 1	
2013	RuPaul's Drag Race	Himself (Pit Crew)	Season 5 (Ep. 8)	
2014	RuPaul's Drag Race	Himself (Pit Crew)	Season 6	
2015	RuPaul's Drag Race	Himself (Pit Crew)	Season 7	
2018	Dragula	Himself (Resurrected Body)	Season 2	
2018	RuPaul's Drag Race	Himself (Pit Crew)	Season 10	
2018	RuPaul's Drag Race Holi-slay Spectacular	Himself (Pit Crew)	TV special	
2019	RuPaul's Drag Race All Stars	Himself (Pit Crew)	Season 4	

Web series

Year	Title	Role	Notes	Ref.
2014	RuPaul Drives...	Himself	Web series starring RuPaul	
2014	Oh Pit Crew	Himself	Companion web series to RuPaul's Drag Race	
2015	Couple$ for Ca$h	Himself	Game show produced by World of Wonder	

Music video appearances

Title	Year	Director	Ref.
"Champion" (RuPaul)	2011	Mathu Andersen	
"I Wanna Have Some Fun" (Pandora Boxx)	2012	Ashley Esqueda	
"love you like a big schlong" (Willam Belli)	2012	Heaven Jones	
"Sissy That Walk" (RuPaul)	2014	Steven Corfe	
"Your Makeup Is Terrible" (Alaska Thunderfuck)	2014	Saša Numić	
"Original" (Orchid and Hound)	2015	Adrian Anchondo	
