= RuPaul's Drag Race season 3 =

2011 season of RuPaul's Drag Race

RuPaul's Drag Race
- Season 3
- Promotional poster for season three
- Hosted by: RuPaul
- Judges: RuPaul; Michelle Visage; Santino Rice; Billy B
- No. of contestants: 13
- Winner: Raja
- Runner-up: Manila Luzon
- Miss Congeniality: Yara Sofia
- Companion show: RuPaul's Drag Race: Untucked!
- No. of episodes: 16

Release
- Original network: Logo TV
- Original release: January 24 – May 2, 2011

Season chronology
- ← Previous; Season 2 Next → Season 4

The third season of RuPaul's Drag Race began airing on January 24, 2011, and ended its run on May 2 of the same year. Thirteen drag queens competed for the title of "America's Next Drag Superstar", a headlining spot on the Absolut Tour, a lifetime supply of Kryolan makeup, and a cash prize of $75,000.

This season had Michelle Visage replacing Merle Ginsberg at the judge's table and Billy Brasfield (better known as Billy B), Mike Ruiz, and Jeffrey Moran filling in for Santino Rice's absence during several episodes. Billy B, celebrity makeup artist and star of the HGTV mini-series Hometown Renovation, appeared as a judge in five episodes, whereas Mike Ruiz only judged for two episodes, and Jeffrey Moran for one; Moran only appeared for promotional reasons. Due to Billy B's continued appearances, he and Rice are now considered to have been alternate judges for the same seat at the judges table, both appearing side-by-side in the reunion special to announce Yara Sofia as the season's Miss Congeniality.

Other changes made included the introduction of a wildcard contestant from the past season, Shangela; an episode with no elimination; and a contestant, Carmen Carrera, being brought back into the competition after having been eliminated a few episodes prior. A new pit crew was also introduced consisting of Jason Carter and Shawn Morales.

The theme song playing during the runway every episode was changed to "Champion" while the song playing during the credits is "Main Event", both from RuPaul's album Champion. As with the previous season, each week's episode was followed by a behind-the-scenes show, RuPaul's Drag Race: Untucked. On December 6, 2011, Amazon.com released this season on DVD via their CreateSpace program.

The winner of the third season of RuPaul's Drag Race was Raja, with Manila Luzon being the runner-up.

== Contestants ==
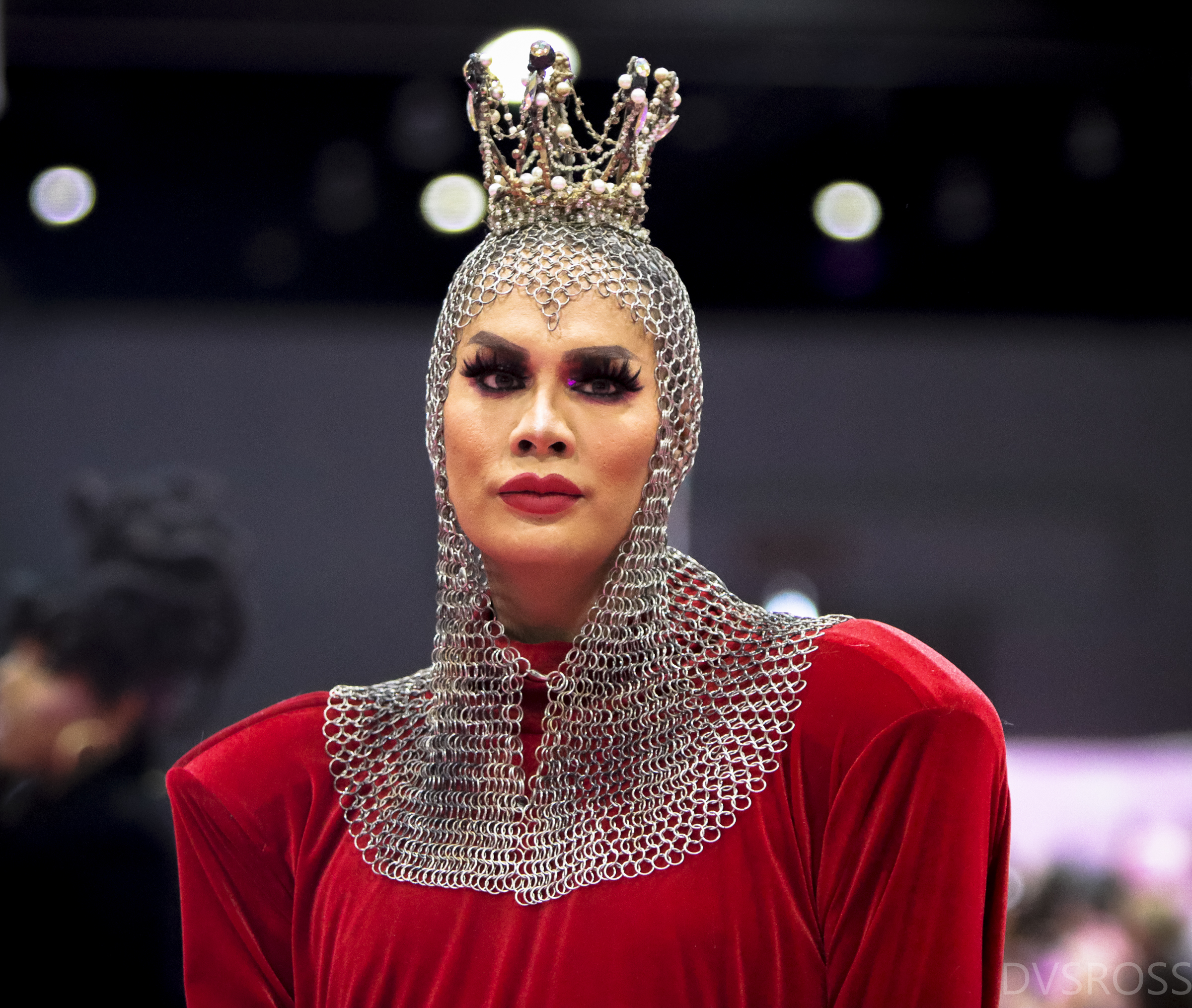
The winner, Raja

Ages, names, and cities stated are at time of filming.

Contestants of RuPaul's Drag Race season 3 and their backgrounds
Contestant	Age	Hometown	Outcome
Raja (Note: Raja Gemini is referred to as Raja on the show)	36	Los Angeles, California	Winner
Manila Luzon	28 (Note: The onscreen caption gives Manila's age as 25)	New York City, New York	Runner-up
Alexis Mateo	30	St. Petersburg, Florida	3rd place
Yara Sofia	26	Manatí, Puerto Rico	4th place (Note: Yara Sofia was voted Miss Congeniality by the viewers)
Carmen Carrera	25	Elmwood Park, New Jersey	5th place (Note: Carmen Carrera originally placed sixth before re-entering the competition)
Shangela (Note: Shangela Laquifa Wadley, simply referred to as Shangela on the show, originally competed on season 2 and placed twelfth)	28	Los Angeles, California	6th place
Delta Work	34	Norwalk, California	7th place
Stacy Layne Matthews	25	Raynham, North Carolina	8th place
Mariah (Note: Mariah Paris Balenciaga is referred to as Mariah on the show)	29	Atlanta, Georgia	9th place
India Ferrah	23	Dayton, Ohio	10th place
Mimi Imfurst	26	New York City, New York	11th place
Phoenix	29	Atlanta, Georgia	12th place
Venus D-Lite	26	Los Angeles, California	13th place

== Contestant progress ==
Legend:

Raja won RuPaul's Drag Race season 3.
Manila Luzon was the runner-up.
Yara Sofia was voted Miss Congeniality (Miss C) by the viewers.
WIN indicates that the contestant won the challenge.
SAFE indicates that the contestant was declared safe by the judges.
IMM (Immunity) indicates that the contestant was immune for the episode.
BTM (Bottom) indicates that the contestant was up for elimination.
ELIM (Eliminated) indicates that the contestant was eliminated.
Guest indicates that the contestant returned as a guest.

Contestants progress with placements in each episode
Contestant	Episode													
Contestant	2	3	4	5	6	7	8	9	10	11	12	13	15	16
Raja	WIN	IMM	SAFE	SAFE	SAFE	WIN	SAFE	SAFE	WIN	SAFE	BTM	SAFE	Winner	Guest
Manila Luzon	SAFE	SAFE	SAFE	WIN	IMM	SAFE	BTM	SAFE	SAFE	SAFE	WIN	WIN	Runner-up	Guest
Alexis Mateo	SAFE	WIN	WIN	IMM	SAFE	BTM	SAFE	WIN	SAFE	BTM	SAFE	BTM	Eliminated	Guest
Yara Sofia	SAFE	SAFE	SAFE	SAFE	SAFE	SAFE	SAFE	BTM	SAFE	WIN	SAFE	ELIM		Miss C
Carmen Carrera	SAFE	SAFE	SAFE	SAFE	SAFE	SAFE	SAFE	BTM	ELIM		ELIM			Guest
Shangela	BTM	WIN	SAFE	SAFE	SAFE	SAFE	WIN	SAFE	BTM	ELIM				Guest
Delta Work	SAFE	BTM	SAFE	SAFE	BTM	SAFE	ELIM							Guest
Stacy Layne Matthews	SAFE	SAFE	SAFE	BTM	WIN	ELIM								Guest
Mariah	SAFE	SAFE	SAFE	SAFE	ELIM									Guest
India Ferrah	SAFE	SAFE	BTM	ELIM										Guest
Mimi Imfurst	SAFE	SAFE	ELIM											Guest
Phoenix	SAFE	ELIM												Guest
Venus D-Lite	ELIM													Guest

== Lip syncs ==
Legend:

The contestant won the Lip Sync for the Crown and was declared the winner of the season.
The contestant was eliminated after their first time in the bottom.
The contestant was eliminated after their second time in the bottom.
The contestant was eliminated after their third time in the bottom.

Episode	Contestants			Song	Eliminated
2	Shangela	vs.	Venus D-Lite	"The Right Stuff" (Vanessa Williams)	Venus D-Lite
3	Delta Work	vs.	Phoenix	"Bad Romance" (Lady Gaga)	Phoenix
4	India Ferrah	vs.	Mimi Imfurst	"Don't Leave Me This Way" (Thelma Houston)	Mimi Imfurst
5	India Ferrah	vs.	Stacy Layne Matthews	"Meeting in the Ladies Room" (Klymaxx)	India Ferrah
6	Delta Work	vs.	Mariah	"Looking for a New Love" (Jody Watley)	Mariah
7	Alexis Mateo	vs.	Stacy Layne Matthews	"Knock on Wood" (Amii Stewart)	Stacy Layne Matthews
8	Delta Work	vs.	Manila Luzon	"MacArthur Park" (Donna Summer)	Delta Work
9	Carmen Carrera	vs.	Yara Sofia	"Mickey (Spanish version)" (Toni Basil)	None
10	Carmen Carrera	vs.	Shangela	"Believe" (Cher)	Carmen Carrera
11	Alexis Mateo	vs.	Shangela	"Even Angels" (Fantasia)	Shangela
12	Carmen Carrera	vs.	Raja	"Straight Up" (Paula Abdul)	Carmen Carrera
13	Alexis Mateo	vs.	Yara Sofia	"I Think About You" (Patti LaBelle)	Yara Sofia
Episode	Contestants			Song	Winner
15	Manila Luzon	vs.	Raja	"Champion (DJ BunJoe's Olympic Mix)" (RuPaul)	Raja

== Guest judges ==
Listed in chronological order:

- Bruce Vilanch, comedy writer, songwriter, and actor
- Mike Ruiz, photographer, director, and reality television personality
- Vanessa Williams, actress, singer, and former Miss America
- Lily Tomlin, actress and comedian
- Alessandra Torresani, actress
- La Toya Jackson, singer
- Susan Powter, motivational speaker and fitness guru
- Chloë Sevigny, actress and model
- Debbie Matenopoulos, television host
- Aisha Tyler, comedian and actress
- Amber Rose, model
- Eliza Dushku, actress
- Sara Rue, actress
- Rita Rudner, comedian
- Arden Myrin, comedian
- Cheryl Tiegs, model
- Johnny Weir, professional figure skater
- Jeffrey Moran, Absolut Vodka marketing/branding executive
- Jody Watley, R&B/pop singer
- Carmen Electra, actress
- Wayne Brady, actor, comedian, and singer
- Fantasia Barrino, singer, actress, and author
- Margaret Cho, actress and comedian
- Sharon Osbourne, television host and reality television personality
- Gigi Levangie, novelist and host of Logo's The Arrangement

== Episodes ==
No. overall	No. in season	Title	Original release date
22	1	"Casting Extravaganza"	January 24, 2011
The first episode shows behind the scenes of the casting process for the 2011 edition of "RuPaul's Drag Race". All the selected contestants are profiled; Manila's audition tape includes an endorsement from her boyfriend, Season 2's Sahara Davenport, while Raja reveals she has done make up for some substantial names in Hollywood, with her audition tape including an endorsement from Adam Lambert. India Ferrah demonstrates through video and old photos his early drag career which started at 14. Mimi and Stacy were premiered as the Big Girls of the Season. Phoenix talks about her start in drag. Venus D-lite and Delta Work are profiled, and it is revealed that they were chosen after auditioning for RuPaul and Santino Rice at an open casting call in Hollywood, California. Also featured are entrants who were not cast in this season, including several queens who would appear on future seasons: Madame LaQueer and Chad Michaels, who would go on to appear on Season 4; Alaska, Detox, and Penny Tration who would go on to appear on Season 5; Joslyn Fox, who would appear on Season 6; Katya Zamolodchikova, Sasha Belle, Mrs. Kasha Davis and Jasmine Masters who appeared on Season 7; Thorgy Thor and Dax ExclamationPoint from Season 8, and Season 11's Nina West. Audition tapes for new "Pit Crew" members are also shown with Shawn Morales and Jason Carter being selected to join the team.
23	2	"The Queen Who Mopped Xmas"	January 24, 2011
Twelve new queens enter the workroom. Shangela, who was eliminated first last season, made a comeback to compete again. For the first mini-challenge, the queens do a Christmas Card photoshoot on a trampoline. Raja wins the mini-challenge. For the main challenge, the queens create an outfit made from Christmas themed items. On the runway, Manila Luzon, Mimi Imfurst and Raja receive positive critiques, with Raja winning the challenge. Carmen Carrera, Shangela and Venus D-Lite receive negative critiques, with Carmen Carrera being safe. Shangela and Venus D-Lite lip-sync to "The Right Stuff" by Vanessa Williams. Shangela wins the lip-sync and Venus D-Lite is the first queen to sashay away.: Guest Judges: Bruce Vilanch, Mike Ruiz and Vanessa Williams; Mini-Challenge: Christmas Card Photoshoot on a trampoline; Mini-Challenge Winner: Raja; Main Challenge: Create an outfit made from Christmas themed items; Challenge Winner: Raja; Challenge Prize: A $2,000 gift card to Sequin Queen; Bottom Two: Shangela and Venus D-Lite; Lip-Sync Song: "The Right Stuff" by Vanessa Williams; Eliminated: Venus D-Lite; Farewell Message: "Don't be shady!!, Be a Lady!, Love ya, Venus D-Lite"
24	3	"Queens in Space"	January 31, 2011
For this week's mini-challenge, the queens pair up and try to guess their partner's choices for different questions. Mariah and Phoenix win the mini-challenge and are named team leaders, tasked with choosing teammates for the main challenge: starring in the trailers for two different installments of the Drag Queens in Outer Space Sci-Fi spoof film saga.: Team Mariah starring in Drag Queens in Outer Space: Return to Uranus : Alexis Mateo, Mariah, Mimi Imfurst, Shangela, Stacy Layne Matthews and Yara Sofia; Team Phoenix starring in Drag Queens in Outer Space: From Earth to Uranus : Carmen Carrera, Delta Work, India Ferrah, Manila Luzon, Phoenix and Raja; On the runway, category is Sci-Fi. Team Mariah is the winning team, with Alexis Mateo and Shangela both winning the challenge. Team Phoenix is the losing team. Carmen Carrera, Delta Work and Phoenix receive negative critiques, with Carmen Carrera being safe. Delta Work and Phoenix lip-sync to "Bad Romance" by Lady Gaga. Delta Work wins the lip-sync and Phoenix sashays away.: Guest Judges: Lily Tomlin and Alessandra Torresani; Mini-Challenge: In pairs, guess your partner's choices for different questions; Mini-Challenge Winners: Mariah and Phoenix; Main Challenge: In teams, star in the trailers for two different installments of the Drag Queens in Outer Space Sci-Fi spoof film saga; Runway Theme: Sci-Fi; Challenge Winners: Alexis Mateo and Shangela; Challenge Prize: A set of hand-sculpted silicone breast plates by Boobs for Queens; Bottom Two: Delta Work and Phoenix; Lip-Sync Song: "Bad Romance" by Lady Gaga; Eliminated: Phoenix; Farewell Message: "Be You Bitches (Boots) Loves, Phoenix"
25	4	"Totally Leotarded"	February 7, 2011
For this week's mini-challenge, the queens pair up and make a leotard using only duct tape. As winners of the mini-challenge, Carmen Carrera and Manila Luzon select their teammates for the main challenge: producing a fitness workout video.: Team Carmen Carrera: Carmen Carrera, Delta Work, India Ferrah, Mariah and Yara Sofia; Team Manila Luzon: Alexis Mateo, Manila Luzon, Mimi Imfurst, Raja, Shangela and Stacy Layne Matthews; On the runway, category is My Favorite Body Part. Alexis Mateo, Stacy Layne Matthews and Yara Sofia receive positive critiques, with Alexis Mateo winning the challenge. India Ferrah, Mariah and Mimi Imfurst receive negative critiques, with Mariah being safe. India Ferrah and Mimi Imfurst lip-sync to "Don't Leave Me This Way" by Thelma Houston. India Ferrah wins the lip-sync and Mimi Imfurst sashays away.: Guest Judges: Billy B., La Toya Jackson and Susan Powter; Mini-Challenge: In pairs, make a leotard using only duct tape; Mini-Challenge Winners: Carmen Carrera and Manila Luzon; Main Challenge: In teams, produce a fitness workout video; Runway Theme: My Favorite Body Part; Challenge Winner: Alexis Mateo; Challenge Prize: A $2,500 gift card to Gilt Groupe; Bottom Two: India Ferrah and Mimi Imfurst; Lip-Sync Song: "Don't Leave Me This Way" by Thelma Houston; Eliminated: Mimi Imfurst; Farewell Message: "mimiimfurst.com 'life is too short to live someone else's"
26	5	"QNN News"	February 14, 2011
For this week's mini-challenge, the queens pose for a scandalous Red Carpet photoshoot. For winning the mini-challenge, Carmen Carrera and Stacy Layne Matthews pick their teammates for the main challenge: producing a morning news show called "QNN News".: Team Carmen Carrera: Carmen Carrera, Delta Work, India Ferrah, Manila Luzon and Raja; Team Stacy Layne Matthews: Alexis Mateo, Mariah, Shangela, Stacy Layne Matthews and Yara Sofia; On the runway, category is Fabulous Drag. Manila Luzon and Shangela receive positive critiques, with Manila Luzon winning the challenge. India Ferrah, Mariah and Stacy Layne Matthews receive negative critiques, with Mariah being safe. India Ferrah and Stacy Layne Matthews lip-sync to "Meeting in the Ladies Room" by Klymaxx. Stacy Layne Matthews wins the lip-sync and India Ferrah sashays away.: Guest Judges: Billy B, Chloë Sevigny and Debbie Matenopoulos; Mini-Challenge: Scandalous Red Carpet photoshoot; Mini-Challenge Winners: Carmen Carrera and Stacy Layne Matthews; Main Challenge: In teams, produce a morning news show called "QNN News"; Runway Theme: Fabulous Drag; Challenge Winner: Manila Luzon; Challenge Prize: A $2,000 gift card to Wig USA; Bottom Two: India Ferrah and Stacy Layne Matthews; Lip-Sync Song: "Meeting in the Ladies Room" by Klymaxx; Eliminated: India Ferrah; Farewell Message: "Never Give Up, You're all stars...India Ferrah"
27	6	"The Snatch Game"	February 21, 2011
For this week's mini-challenge, the queens play a game of "Shit RuPaul Says". Delta Work wins the mini-challenge. For the main challenge, the queens play the Snatch Game. Aisha Tyler and Amber Rose star as the celebrity contestants. The cast consisted of: Alexis Mateo as Alicia Keys; Carmen Carrera as Jennifer Lopez; Delta Work as Cher; Manila Luzon as Imelda Marcos; Mariah as Joan Crawford; Raja as Tyra Banks; Shangela as Tina Turner; Stacy Layne Matthews as Mo'Nique; Yara Sofia as Amy Winehouse; On the runway, category is Best Drag. Alexis Mateo, Raja and Stacy Layne Matthews receive positive critiques, with Stacy Layne Matthews winning the challenge. Delta Work, Mariah and Yara Sofia receive negative critiques, with Yara Sofia being safe. Delta Work and Mariah lip-sync to "Looking for a New Love" by Jody Watley. Delta Work wins the lip-sync and Mariah sashays away.: Guest Judges: Aisha Tyler and Amber Rose; Mini-Challenge: Shit RuPaul Says; Mini-Challenge Winner: Delta Work; Main Challenge: Snatch Game; Runway Theme: Best Drag; Challenge Winner: Stacy Layne Matthews; Challenge Prize: A cruise for 2 to the Bahamas courtesy of Al and Chuck Travel; Bottom Two: Delta Work and Mariah; Lip-Sync Song: "Looking for a New Love" by Jody Watley; Eliminated: Mariah; Farewell Message: "Condragulations Raja. Mug4Dayz! Mariah"
28	7	"Face, Face, Face of Cakes"	February 28, 2011
For this week's mini-challenge, the queens do a nude photoshoot. Carmen Carrera wins the mini-challenge. For the main challenge the queens create an outfit inspired by a bakery cake.: Alexis Mateo - Cheesecake; Carmen Carrera - Princess Cake; Delta Work - Angel Food Cake; Manila Luzon - Carrot Cake; Raja - Chocolate Lava Cake; Shangela - Pineapple Upside Down Cake; Stacey Layne Matthews - Red Velvet Cake; Yara Sofia - Strawberry Shortcake; On the runway, Delta Work, Manila Luzon, Raja and Yara Sofia receive positive critiques, with Raja winning the challenge. Alexis Mateo, Carmen Carrera, Shangela and Stacy Layne Matthews receive negative critiques, with Carmen Carrera and Shangela being safe. Alexis Mateo and Stacy Layne Matthews lip-sync to "Knock on Wood" by Amii Stewart. Alexis Mateo wins the lip-sync and Stacy Layne Matthews sashays away.: Guest Judges: Billy B., Eliza Dushku and Sara Rue; Mini-Challenge: Nude photoshoot; Mini-Challenge Winner: Carmen Carrera; Main Challenge: Create an outfit inspired by a bakery cake; Challenge Winner: Raja; Main Challenge Prize: A shopping spree at L.A. Eyeworks; Bottom Two: Alexis Mateo and Stacy Layne Matthews; Lip Sync Song: "Knock on Wood" by Amii Stewart; Eliminated: Stacy Layne Matthews; Farewell Message: "Be a lady! You're All Amazing. Stacy Layne “Bryant” Matthews XOX"
29	8	"Ru Ha Ha!"	March 7, 2011
For this week's mini-challenge, the queens read each other to filth. Shangela wins the mini-challenge. For the main challenge, the queens perform a stand-up comedy routine in front of the judges and a live audience. On the runway, Carmen Carrera, Raja, Shangela and Yara Sofia receive positive critiques, with Shangela winning the challenge. Delta Work and Manila Luzon receive negative critiques, and are announced as the bottom two. They lip-sync to "MacArthur Park" by Donna Summer. Manila Luzon wins the lip-sync and Delta Work sashays away.: Guest Judges: Billy B., Rita Rudner and Arden Myrin; Mini-Challenge: Reading is Fundamental; Mini-Challenge Winner: Shangela; Main Challenge: Perform a stand-up comedy routine in front of the judges a live audience; Challenge Winner: Shangela; Challenge Prize: An original, custom designed gown from Miami Elite Designs; Bottom Two: Delta Work and Manila Luzon; Lip-Sync Song: "MacArthur Park" by Donna Summer; Eliminated: Delta Work; Farewell Message: "WORK HEATHERS xoxo Delta"
30	9	"Life, Liberty and the Pursuit of Style"	March 14, 2011
For this week's mini-challenge, the queens decorate regular bras using rhinestones. Manila Luzon wins the mini-challenge. For the main challenge, the queens film a patriotic message addressed to US military personnel overseas. On the runway, category is Patriotic Drag. Alexis Mateo and Shangela receive positive critiques, with Alexis Mateo winning the challenge. Carmen Carrera, Manila Luzon, Raja and Yara Sofia receive negative critiques, with Manila Luzon and Raja being safe. Carmen Carrera and Yara Sofia lip-sync to "Mickey (Spanish Version)" by Toni Basil. Both queens win the lip-sync and no one goes home.: Guest Judges: Cheryl Tiegs and Johnny Weir; Mini-Challenge: Decorate regular bras using rhinestones; Mini-Challenge Winner: Manila Luzon; Main Challenge: Film a patriotic message addressed to US military personnel overseas; Runway Theme: Patriotic Drag; Challenge Winner: Alexis Mateo; Challenge Prize: A three-piece luxury luggage set from Antler Luggage; Bottom Two: Carmen Carrera and Yara Sofia; Lip-Sync Song: "Mickey (Spanish Version)" by Toni Basil; Eliminated: None; Carmen Carrera's Stay Message: "I kiss Johnny Weir! Carmen Carrera"; Yara Sofia's Stay Message: "I'm still here! Echa Pa Lante xoxo Y.S."
31	10	"RuPaul-a-palooza"	March 21, 2011
For this week's mini-challenge, the queens play a game of musical chairs. Manila Luzon wins the mini-challenge. For the main challenge, the queens perform RuPaul's song "Superstar" in different music genres.: Alexis Mateo - Hip Hop; Carmen Carrera - Reggae; Manila Luzon - Disco; Raja - Punk Rock; Shangela - Country; Yara Sofia - Pop; On the runway, Manila Luzon, Raja and Yara Sofia receive positive critiques, with Raja winning the challenge. Alexis Mateo, Carmen Carrera and Shangela receive negative critiques, with Alexis Mateo being safe. Carmen Carrera and Shangela lip-sync to "Believe" by Cher. Shangela wins the lip-sync and Carmen Carrera sashays away.: Guest Judges: Jeffrey Moran, Jody Watley, and Carmen Electra; Mini-Challenge: Play a game of musical chairs; Mini-Challenge Winner: Manila Luzon; Main Challenge: Perform RuPaul's song "Superstar" in different music genres; Challenge Winner: Raja; Challenge Prize: An original, custom gown by Marco Marco; Bottom Two: Carmen Carrera and Shangela; Lip-Sync Song: "Believe" by Cher; Eliminated: Carmen Carrera; Farewell Message: "Heathers better win."
32	11	"The Hair Ball"	March 28, 2011
For this weeks mini-challenge, the queens create beach-themed headpieces. Raja wins the mini-challenge. For the main challenge, the queens create three looks for The Hair Ball: A Classic Look from Another Era, A Modern Red Carpet Look and A Fantasy Hair Outfit On the runway, Manila Luzon, Raja and Yara Sofia receive positive critiques, with Yara Sofia winning the challenge. Alexis Mateo and Shangela receive negative critiques, and are announced as the bottom two. They lip-sync to "Even Angels" by Fantasia. Alexis Mateo wins the lip-sync and Shangela sashays away. At the end of the episode, RuPaul tells the other queens that the judges will be voting one of the eliminated queens back into the competition.: Guest Judges: Wayne Brady and Fantasia Barrino; Mini-Challenge: Create beach-themed headpieces; Mini-Challenge Winner: Raja; Main Challenge: The Hair Ball; Runway Themes: A Classic Look from Another Era, A Modern Red Carpet Look and A Fantasy Hair Outfit; Challenge Winner: Yara Sofia; Challenge Prize: An Alaskan cruise for 2 from Al and Chuck Travel; Bottom Two: Alexis Mateo and Shangela; Lip-Sync Song: "Even Angels" by Fantasia; Eliminated: Shangela; Farewell Message: "Always live your dreams and believe in second chances. Halleloo! Love Shangela"
33	12	"Jocks in Frocks"	April 4, 2011
At the beginning of the episode, RuPaul reveals that the judges have voted back Carmen Carrera, and she officially returns to the competition. For the mini-challenge, the queens play a game of Dunk-A-Queen, in which the queens will have to dunk their opponents. Alexis Mateo wins the mini-challenge. For the main challenge, the queens makeover heterosexual male athletes. On the runway, Alexis Mateo, Manila Luzon and Yara Sofia receive positive critiques, with Manila Luzon winning the challenge. Carmen Carrera and Raja receive negative critiques, and are announced as the bottom two. They lip-sync to "Straight Up" by Paula Abdul. Raja wins the lip-sync and Carmen Carrera sashays away.: Guest Judges: Mike Ruiz, Margaret Cho and Sharon Osbourne; Returned: Carmen Carrera; Mini-Challenge: Dunk-A-Queen; Mini-Challenge Winner: Alexis Mateo; Main Challenge: Makeover heterosexual male athletes; Challenge Winner: Manila Luzon; Challenge Prize: A cruise for 2 to the Bahamas courtesy of Al and Chuck Travel; Bottom Two: Carmen Carrera and Raja; Lip-Sync Song: "Straight Up" by Paula Abdul; Eliminated: Carmen Carrera; Farewell Message: "Good bye AGAIN!! Best of luck to everyone. Turn it out & don't be a sprepper! xoxo Carmen"
34	13	"The Money Ball"	April 11, 2011
For this week's mini-challenge, the queens create a marketable drag product and deliver a sales pitch for it on fictitious home shopping network "RuVC". Yara Sofia wins the mini-challenge. For the main challenge, the queens create three looks for The Money Ball: Swimsuit Body Beautiful, Cocktail Attire After 5 and Evening Gown Eleganza. On the runway, Manila Luzon and Raja receive positive critiques, with Manila Luzon winning the challenge. Alexis Mateo and Yara Sofia receive negative critiques, and are announced as the bottom two. They lip-sync to "I Think About You" by Patti LaBelle. Alexis Mateo wins the lip-sync and Yara Sofia sashays away.: Guest Judges: Mike Ruiz, La Toya Jackson and Gigi Levangie; Mini-Challenge: Create a marketable drag product and deliver a sales pitch for it on fictitious home shopping network "RuVC"; Mini-Challenge Winner: Yara Sofia; Main Challenge: The Money Ball; Runway Themes: Swimsuit Body Beautiful, Cocktail Attire After 5 and Evening Gown Eleganza; Challenge Winner: Manila Luzon; Challenge Prize: A collection of fine jewelry from Kathy Ireland Jewelry; Bottom Two: Alexis Mateo and Yara Sofia; Lip-Sync Song: "I Think About You" by Patti LaBelle; Eliminated: Yara Sofia; Farewell Message: "Echa pa' lante, no mires pa' atras pa' coger impulso, and you know what f&%k you haha" (Push forward, don't look back to gain momentum, and you know what f&#k you haha)
35	14	"RuPaul Rewind"	April 18, 2011
A look back at the highlights, low-lights and previously unseen footage from the first 13 episodes. Chaz Bono made a cameo appearance during the episode's opening scene as a spot light operator. Season two winner Tyra Sanchez as well as runner-ups Raven and Jujubee returned to the provide their opinions on the season's highlights.
36	15	"Grand Finale"	April 25, 2011
For the final challenge of the season, the queens star in RuPaul's music video "Champion (DJ BunJoe's Olympic Mix)". On the runway, Alexis Mateo is eliminated from the competition, leaving Manila Luzon and Raja as the top two queens of the season. They lip-sync to "Champion (DJ BunJoe's Olympic Mix)" by RuPaul. It is then announced that Raja is the winner, leaving Manila Luzon as the runner-up.: Main Challenge: Star in RuPaul's music video "Champion (DJ BunJoe's Olympic Mix)"; Eliminated: Alexis Mateo; Farewell Message: "Always know your place. The jig is up!!! Siempre, Alexis"; Top Two: Manila Luzon and Raja; Lip-Sync Song: "Champion (DJ BunJoe's Olympic Mix)" by RuPaul; Runner-up: Manila Luzon; Farewell Message: "Positive Always! I Love You Mommy & Daddy! Manila Luzon :)"; Winner of RuPaul's Drag Race Season Three: Raja
37	16	"Reunited"	May 2, 2011
The queens all return for the reunion. Discussions include: Mimi Imfurst picking up India Ferrah during their lip-sync, all the girls' issues with Shangela during the season, and the "Heathers" vs. the "Boogers". It is then announced that Yara Sofia is this season's Miss Congeniality.: Miss Congeniality: Yara Sofia

== Ratings ==
Episode	Title	Viewers (in millions)	Households^{1}	Ages 18–49^{1}	Network
2	The Queen who Mopped Xmas	0.449	-	0.4/1	LOGO
3	Queens in Space	0.560	0.3/1	0.3/1	VH1
4	Totally Leotarded	0.478	0.3/1	0.2/1	VH1
5	QNN News	0.537	0.4/1	0.3/1	VH1
6	The Snatch Game	0.503	0.3/1	0.2/1	VH1
7	Face, Face, Face of Cakes	0.486	0.4/1	0.2/1	VH1
8	Ru Ha Ha	0.483	0.3/1	0.2/1	VH1

^{1}Based upon point/share system for Nielsen ratings. The first number represents the percentage of households within the population viewing the program (known as points). The second number (known as shares) is how many households were expected to view the program, within the population. For example, Episode 8 has a point/share of "0.3/1". This means .3% of households viewed the program from the expected 1%, showing .7% of the show's audience were watching a different program.

== Controversy ==
=== Raja's win leaked ===
Before the season even started airing, blogger Perez Hilton revealed Raja as the winner to the public, causing an uproar from fans. It also led to the show's crowning format being changed, with the finale taped with several different winning outcomes. The true outcome would then be announced during the broadcast of the finale in an attempt to conceal the winner's identity and prevent any spoilers from taking place. This took place from the following season-onwards.
