= Orchid and Hound =

Pop duo

- Origin: San Francisco, CA, United States
- Genres: Pop
- Years active: 2009–present
- Members: John Constantine; Lawrence Alarcon
- Website: http://www.orchidandhound.com

Orchid and Hound is a pop duo composed of John Constantine and Lawrence Alarcon. Their music has been described as pop music paired with lush arrangements and strong vocal harmonies with influences of Björk, Jacques Brel and Queen.

== Early history and formation ==
John Constantine and Lawrence Alarcon met as teenagers attending Los Angeles County High School for the Arts, one of top five art high schools in the U.S. They soon began dating, eventually moving to San Francisco's Tenderloin district together in 2006. Despite a tumultuous break-up, the two remained close, and in 2009 decided to formally establish a band. Orchid and Hound made their debut on September 22, 2009 at San Francisco gay bar The Stud. The name, according to Alarcon, refers to "the duality of [their] personalities", with the orchid representing Alarcon's reserved nature and the hound describing Constantine's more outspoken tendencies.

== Gaining momentum (2009–present) ==
The duo quickly followed up their debut with several performance around San Francisco and Los Angeles, including gigs at Hotel Café and El Rio. Currently, Orchid and Hound are working on their debut album, scheduled for a Fall 2010 release. While doing so, they continue to tour extensively in Los Angeles and San Francisco. In 2010, they performed in the One Little Indian showcase at South by Southwest. The performance was well-received; Angry Song named them part of that year's "Top of the Crop." On April 14, 2010, Orchid and Hound launched a project with Kickstarter to raise a goal of $2,000 in 90 to manufacture their debut album. In less than 5 days they had raised 105% of their goal.

In November 2013 Orchid and Hound released their single (and music video) entitled "Go On". In early 2014 the San Francisco-based pop duo returned to Los Angeles, California indefinitely to continue their musical efforts. They released the single (and music video) ""If You Stay"" to commemorate the move.

== Discography ==
- The Boyfriend (2012)
- Better Than a Saint EP (2013)
- If You Stay Single (2014)
- Solo EP (2015)
