= Alexis Mateo =

Puerto Rican drag queen

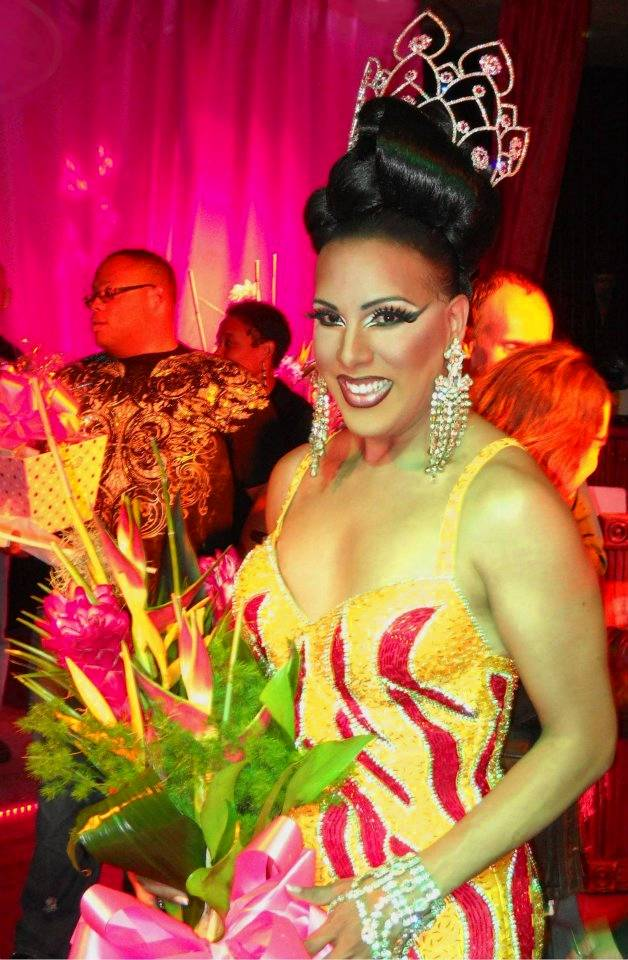
- Mateo in 2012
- Born: Alexis Mateo Pacheco; July 24, 1979 (age 47); Florida, Puerto Rico
- Education: Interamerican University of Puerto Rico (BA)
- Occupation: Drag queen
- Years active: 2006–present
- Known for: RuPaul's Drag Race (season 3); RuPaul's Drag Race All Stars (season 1); RuPaul's Drag Race All Stars (season 5); Canada's Drag Race: Canada vs. the World (season 2); Drag Race México: Latina Royale
- Website: www.missalexismateo.com

Alexis Mateo Pacheco (born July 24, 1979), best known as Alexis Mateo, is a Puerto Rican drag queen, performer, reality television personality, fashion designer, and the winner of All American Goddess 2016, Miss Gay Days 2016, National Showgirl 2017, and Miss Continental Elite 2025. She became internationally known as a contestant on season three of RuPaul's Drag Race, seasons one and five of RuPaul's Drag Race All Stars, season two of Canada's Drag Race: Canada vs. the World, and Drag Race México: Latina Royale, becoming the first queen in the entire franchise to compete five times. Alexis Mateo is also drag mother of viral sensation and "RuGirl" Vanessa Vanjie Mateo.

== Early life ==
Born in 1979, Alexis Mateo began her drag career in Puerto Rico's gay nightclub circuit before relocating in 2001 to Orlando, Florida, where she worked as a dancer and performer at Disney World. In addition to her drag career, which began in 2006, she is a fashion designer and won the 2001 Inter Fashion Award for Best Fashion Designer.

== Career ==
While residing in Central Florida, she won many gay pageants including Miss Florida US of A, Miss Florida Latina, Miss Orlando, Miss Central Florida, Miss Lakeland, Miss Waterside, Miss Suncoast, Miss Suncoast America, Miss ASAP, Miss Lakeland America, Miss Orlando Latina, Miss Florida International, and Sunshine State All American Goddess.

Mateo has been active in AIDS awareness and activism. After being featured in a Gilead Sciences ad titled "Red Ribbon Runway" with fellow Drag Race co-stars Manila Luzon, Delta Work, Shangela Laquifa Wadley, and Carmen Carrera, the dress she was featured wearing was auctioned off by Logo in commemoration of World AIDS Day. Proceeds from the auction were donated to the National Association of People with AIDS. In 2012, along with other RuPaul's Drag Race contestants, Mateo appeared in the music video "Queen" by band Xelle (which featured former drag race contestant Mimi Imfurst as a member). She was one of thirty drag queens featured in Miley Cyrus's 2015 VMA performance.

=== RuPaul's Drag Race ===
Mateo joined as a cast member on the third season of Logo's reality series, RuPaul's Drag Race, which premiered on the network on January 29, 2011. Mateo won three of the main challenges (Episodes 2, 3, and 8) before making it to the top three, where she was eliminated in the season finale which aired on April 25, 2011.

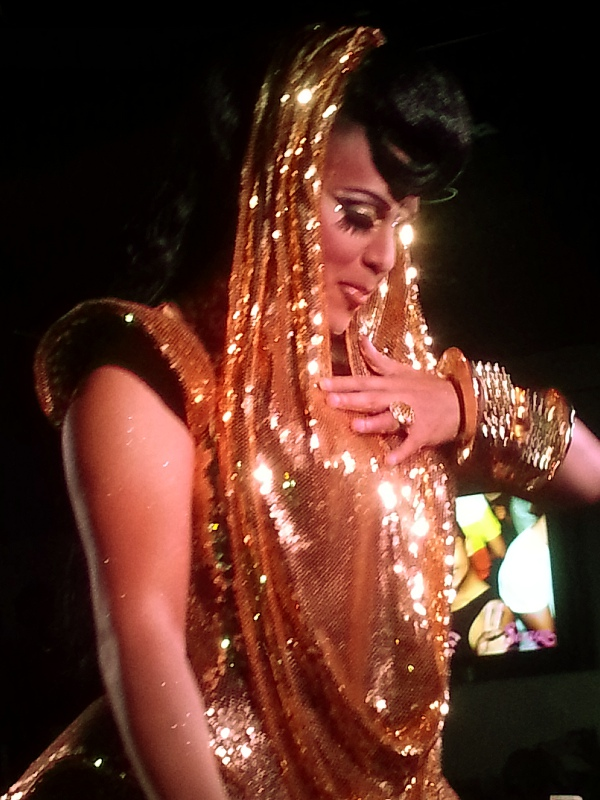
Alexis performing "Come & Get It" by Selena Gomez in June 2013.

Mateo served as a guest professor on the third episode of the third season of Drag Race spin-off series RuPaul's Drag U. On August 6, 2012, it was announced that Mateo was one of twelve past Drag Race contestants selected to join the cast of RuPaul's Drag Race: All Stars that premiered on the Logo network on October 22, 2012. Teamed with contestant Yara Sofia to form Team Yarlexis, the duo was eliminated in the fourth episode of the series which aired on November 12, 2012.

Mateo made a guest appearance in the premiere episode of AJ and the Queen in 2020.

On May 8, 2020, Mateo was announced as one of the ten queens competing on the fifth season of RuPaul's Drag Race All Stars. Mateo was eliminated in episode 6, ultimately placing 5th. Her elimination came largely because of accusations from India Ferrah that Mateo had campaigned against eventual winner Shea Couleé. Mateo was vindicated in the series finale when Ferrah's claims were shown to be lies, and Shea apologized for jumping to conclusions.

In March, Alexis Mateo, alongside the rest of the RuPaul's Drag Race Live! cast, performed with Katy Perry during her Play concert residency at Resorts World Las Vegas.

== Pageant Titles ==
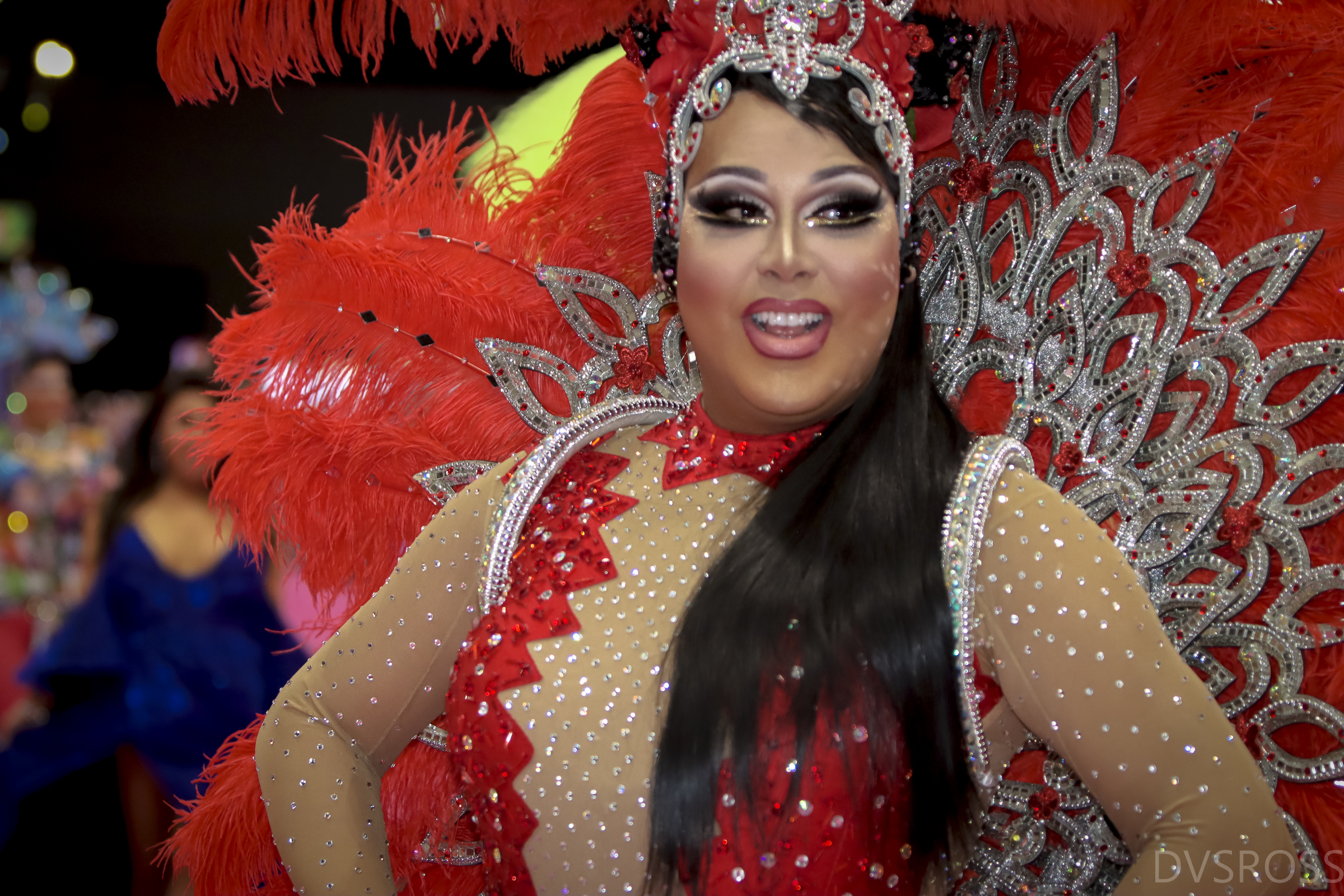
Alexis Mateo at RuPaul's DragCon LA in 2022

Mateo has competed in many pageants and holds many titles, including:

- Miss Lakeland 2004, winner
- Miss Gay Florida USofA 2006, winner
- Miss Gay Florida America 2007, 1st alternate
- Miss Gay Florida America 2008, 1st alternate
- Miss Orlando Latina 2009
- Miss Gay Florida International 2010, winner
- Miss Parliament House 2012, 1st alternate
- Miss Heart of Florida 2013, 1st alternate
- Miss Gay Georgia USofA 2013, 1st alternate
- Miss Tampa Bay International 2013, winner
- Sunshine State All American Goddess 2014, winner
- Miss Gay Southern States USofA 2014, winner
- Miss North Florida FI 2015, winner
- Miss Florida FI 2015, 1st alternate
- Miss Gay USofA 2015, 3rd alternate
- Miss Tampa Pride 2016, winner
- Miss Gay Days 2016, winner
- Kentucky All American Goddess 2016, winner
- All American Goddess 2016, winner
- National Showgirl 2017, winner
- Miss Continental Elite 2025, winner

Mateo is also a former Miss Florida Latina, Miss Orlando, Miss Central Florida, Miss Waterside, Miss Suncoast, Miss Suncoast America, Miss Lakeland America and Miss ASAP.

== Personal life ==
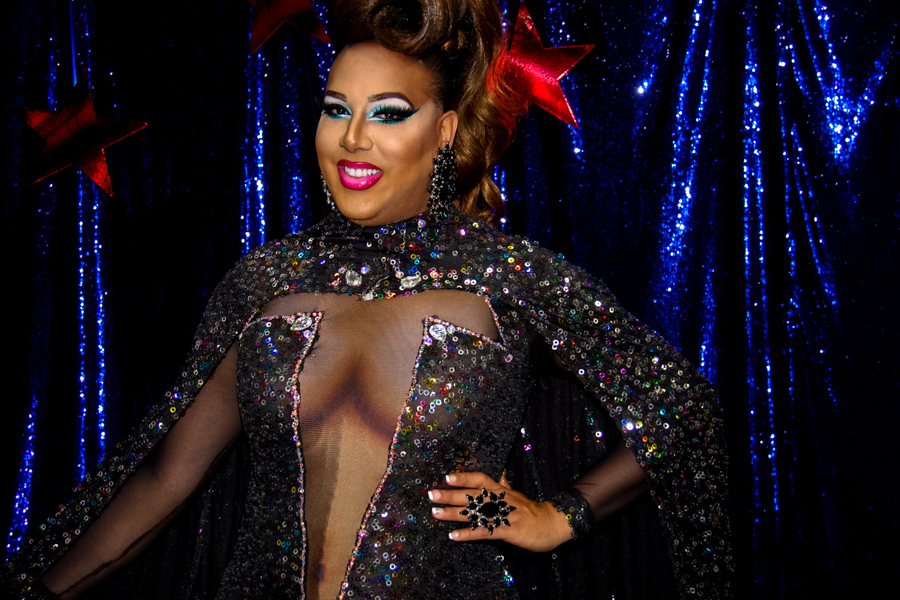
Alexis Mateo at RuPaul's DragCon LA in 2018

Mateo resides in Las Vegas, Nevada, where she performs at gay venues and events both locally and throughout the United States. In April 2011, Mateo along with fellow contestant Yara Sofia launched a boycott of a Tampa beauty supply shop after the two claimed they had been told to leave the store because of their sexual orientation. Her drag daughter is season 10 and season 11 Drag Race contestant Vanessa Vanjie Mateo. On March 1, 2018, her Instagram account was hacked and deleted, forcing him to make a new one.

== Discography ==
=== Singles ===
==== Featured singles ====
Title	Year	Album
"Big Girl" (Joelapussy featuring Alyssa Edwards and Alexis Mateo)	2013	non-album single

As Featured Artist

Title	Year	Album
"I'm in Love" (with the Cast of RuPaul's Drag Race All Stars, Season 5)	2020	Non-album single

== Filmography ==
=== Television ===
Year	Title	Role	Notes	Ref(s)
2011	RuPaul's Drag Race	Herself	Contestant; 3rd Place (Season 3, 16 episodes)	
2011	RuPaul's Drag Race: Untucked	Herself	Contestant (Season 2, 13 episodes)	
2012	RuPaul's Drag Race All Stars	Herself	Contestant; 5th/6th Place (Season 1, 4 episodes)	
2012	RuPaul's Drag Race All Stars: Untucked	Herself	Contestant (Season 1, 4 episodes)	
2013	RuPaul's Drag U	Herself	Drag Professor (Season 3, 1 episode)	
2020	AJ and the Queen	Herself	Guest appearance	
2020	RuPaul's Drag Race All Stars	Herself	Contestant; 5th Place (Season 5, 7 episodes)	
2020	RuPaul's Drag Race All Stars: Untucked	Herself	Contestant (Season 2)	
2021	Drag Race España	Herself	Guest appearance (Season 1)	
2021	RuPaul's Drag Race All Stars	Herself	Lip-Sync Assassin (Season 6, episode 7)	
2021	RuPaul's Drag Race All Stars: Untucked	Herself	Season 3	
2022	Drag Race España	Herself	Guest judge (Season 2)	
2023	Drag Me to Dinner	Herself	Hulu original reality series	
2024	Canada's Drag Race: Canada vs. the World	Herself	Contestant; Runner-up (Season 2, 6 episodes)	
2026	Drag Race México: Latina Royale	Herself	Contestant; 5th place (Season 1, 10 episodes)	

=== Web series ===
Year	Title	Role	Notes	Ref
2019	Hey Qween!	Herself	Guest	
2019	Drag Queen Video Dates	Herself	Guest	
2020	Besties For Cash	Herself	Guest	
2020	Whatcha Packin	Herself	Guest	
2020	Dragueando	Herself	Host	
2021–present	Fashion Photo RuView	Herself	Guest	
2022	Portrait of a Queen	Herself	Episode: "Jaida Essence Hall"	
2023	Give It To Me Straight	Herself	Guest	
2023	Binge Queens: Drag Race Mexico	Herself	Host	
2023	LGBTQ Herstory Month: Honoring Latinx Heroes	Herself	Web special	
2024	RuPaul's Drag Race Live Untucked	Herself	WOWPresents Plus original	
2024	Very Delta	Herself	Guest	

=== Music videos ===
Year	Title	Artist
2011	Champion	RuPaul
2012	Responsitrannity	RuPaul
2012	Queen	Xelle
2020	Bitch Please	Derrick Barry, Nebraska Thunderfuck, & Velo
