= Side Hustles (RuPaul's Drag Race All Stars) =

2021 American television episode

- RuPaul's Drag Race All Stars episode
- Episode no.: Season 6 Episode 3
- Presented by: RuPaul
- Original air date: July 1, 2021

Guest appearances
- Tia Mowry (guest judge); Laganja Estranja

Episode chronology
- RuPaul's Drag Race All Stars (season 6)

"Side Hustles" is the third episode of the sixth season of the American television series RuPaul's Drag Race All Stars. It originally aired on July 1, 2021. The episode's main challenge tasks the contestants with writing and starring inn commercials promoting their "side hustles". Tia Mowry is a guest judge. Laganja Estranja also makes a guest appearance.

== Episode ==
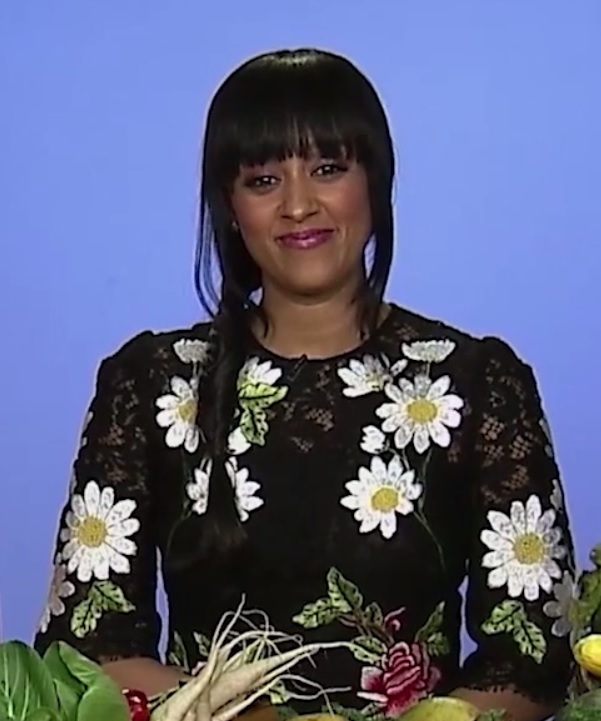
Tia Mowry is a guest judge.

For the main challenge, the contestants are tasked with teaming up to write and star in commercial that promote their side hustle. A'keria C. Davenport, Ginger Minj, Jan, and Silky Nutmeg Ganache are on Team 1. Their side hustle is Rent-a-Queen. Pandora Boxx, Ra'Jah O'Hara, Trinity K. Bonet, and Yara Sofia are on Team 2. Their side hustle is Drag Fixers. Eureka!, Kylie Sonique Love, and Scarlet Envy are on Team 3. Their side hustle is Drag Exorcists.

Tia Mowry is a guest judge. On the runway, the contestants must redeem a look that they wore in their previous season. Team 2 is considered the winning team, with Trinity K. Bonet being the Top All Star of the week. Team 3 is deemed safe. The four members of Team 1 place in the bottom.

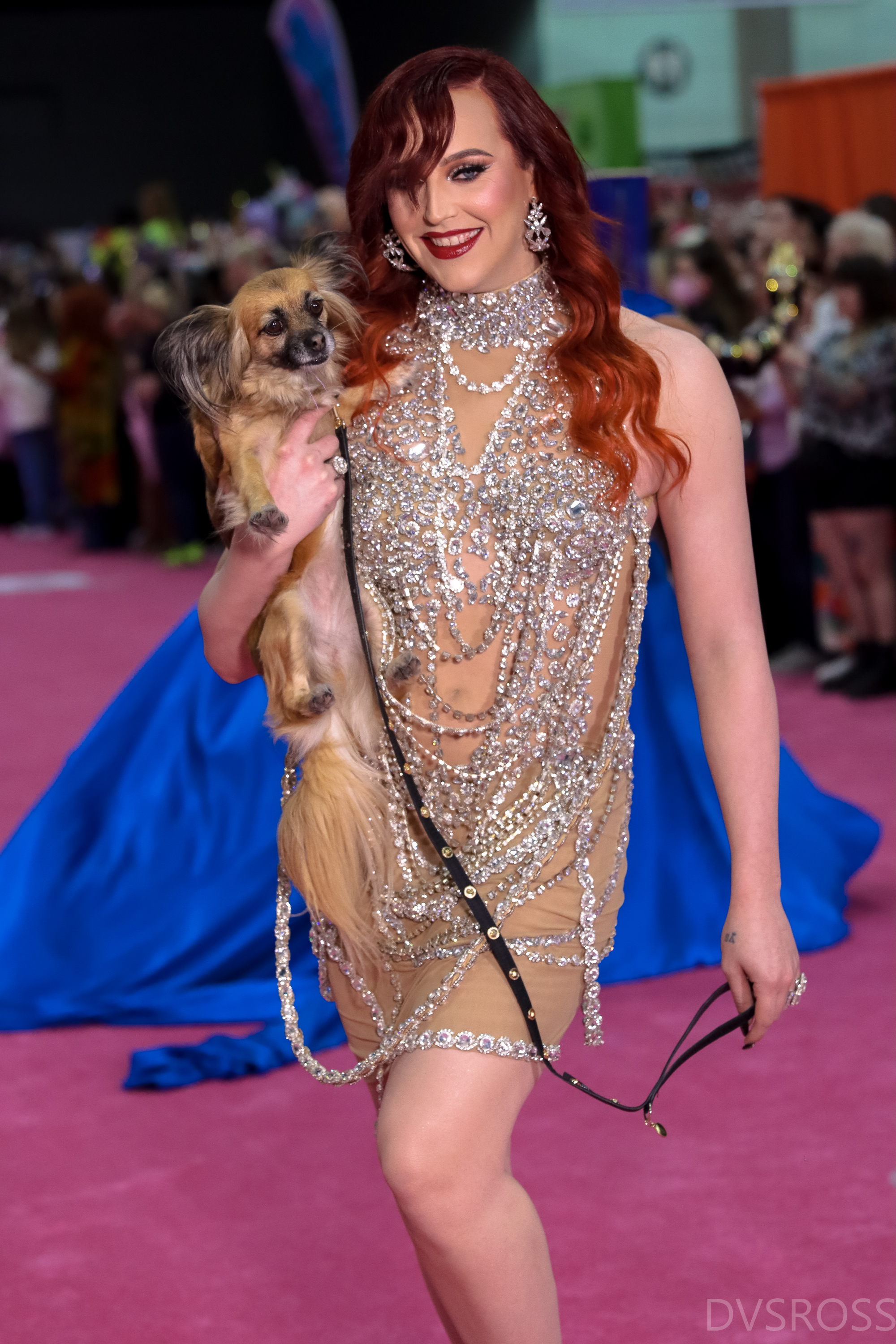
Laganja Estranja (pictured in 2023) makes a guest appearance.

It is revealed that Season 6's Laganja Estranja is this week's Lip Sync Assassin. Laganja Estranja is announced the winner and reveals that the group has chosen to eliminate Silky Nutmeg Ganache from the competition.

== Production ==
The episode originally aired on July 1, 2021.

=== Fashion ===
For the main challenge, Ra'Jah O'Hara wears an outfit similar to her eleventh season promo look. Ginger Minj wears a robe with Jan's face.

For the fashion show, Scarlet Envy recreates her entrance look from the eleventh season, which had a Renaissance print. Kylie Sonique Love recreates an outfit she wore impersonating Lady Gaga for the Snatch Game on the second season.

== Reception ==
According to Gay Times, the episode's lip-sync contest "has gone down in history as one of the best". In 2021, the website's Damshenas wrote, "Laganja's return was met with overwhelmingly positive reviews from fans and critics, particularly for her epic stunts on the main stage, and viewers came out in droves on social media to demand a full-length comeback from the star for an upcoming season". Damshenas ranked the lip-sync first in a 2021 list of contests on the season to date and wrote, "Laganja Estranja's entrance is worth the top spot alone. Give it an Emmy. Fuck it, give it the EGOT."

In 2022, Jaime Lubin of Honeysuckle Magazine said the performance was one of the competition's most watched, with approximately 3.5 million views on YouTube. McKinley Franklin of Screen Rant called the contest "iconic" in 2024, writing: "Laganja performed many demanding stunts and dance moves, shocking RuPaul and the rest of the judges in the process. There was no doubt she won the lipsync, and it was one of the top moments from All Stars season 6." Charlie Duncan of PinkNews called Laganja Estraja's performance "legendary" in 2025. Bernardo Sim of Out ranked the lip-sync third in a 2025 list of the show 30 best contests to date.
