= Rudemption Lip-Sync Smackdown =

- RuPaul's Drag Race All Stars episode
- Episode no.: Season 6 Episode 10
- Presented by: RuPaul
- Original air date: August 19, 2021

Episode chronology
- RuPaul's Drag Race All Stars (season 6)

"Rudemption Lip-Sync Smackdown" is the tenth episode of the sixth season of the American television series RuPaul's Drag Race All Stars. It originally aired on August 19, 2021. The episode has the season's eliminated contestants compete in a series of lip-sync contests to earn a place back in the competition. Silky Nutmeg Ganache defeats multiple contestants, though the winner of the tournament is not revealed.

== Episode ==
The episode starts with a video montage of the season's eliminated contestants. The four remaining contestants return to the Werk Room after Eureka's elimination on the previous episode. Carson Kressley appears in a video message and reveals that the eliminated contestants have been competing in the "game within a game", a series of lip-sync contests called "RuPaul's Secret RuDemption Lip Sync Smackdown". He says which contestants have competed in the tournament to fight their way back into the competition. The finalists watch the lip-syncs.

The first lip-sync is between Serena ChaCha and Jiggly Caliente, who perform to "Free Your Mind" (1992) by En Vogue. Jiggly Caliente wins, then competes against Silky Nutmeg Ganache to "Girls Just Want to Have Fun" (1983) by Cyndi Lauper. Silky Nutmeg Ganache wins the lip-sync and continues to win contests against Yara Sofia to "Point of No Return" (1985) by Exposé and Scarlet Envy to "Song for the Lonely" (2002) by Cher. RuPaul reveals that A'keria C. Davenport chose not to participate in the tournament. Silky Nutmeg Ganache asks to perform solo, which RuPaul allows. Silky Nutmeg Ganache lip-syncs to "Barbie Girl" (1997) by Aqua. She then defeats Jan and Pandora Boxx in lip-syncs to "Heartbreaker" (1979) by Pat Benatar and "Focus" (2015) by Ariana Grande, respectively. In the final lip-sync, Eureka and Silky Nutmeg Ganache face off to "Since U Been Gone" (2004) by Kelly Clarkson. Kressley reveals the result will be shared until the next episode.

== Broadcast and production ==
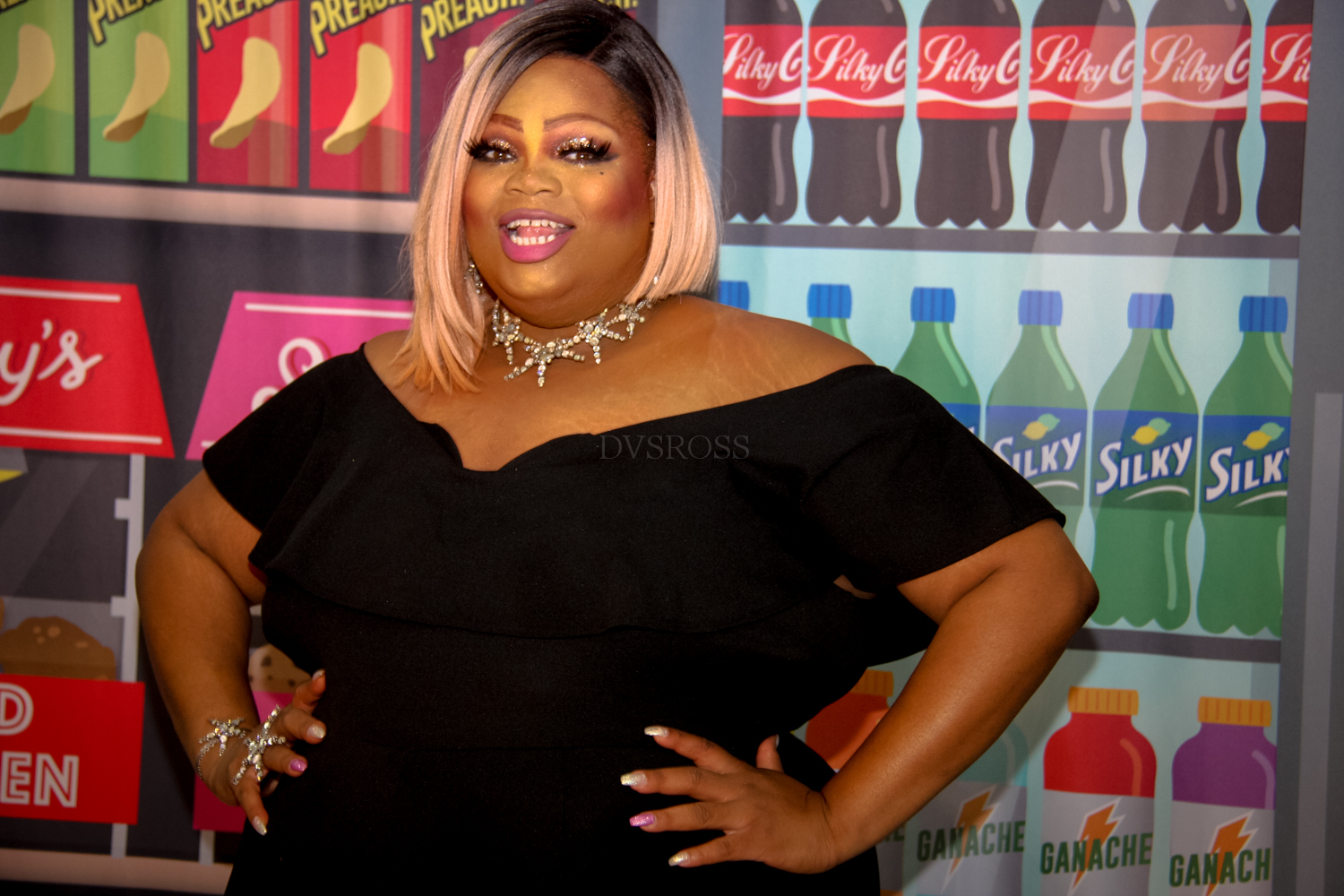
The episode sees Silky Nutmeg Ganache win multiple lip-sync contests against fellow competitors.

The episode originally aired on August 19, 2021.

=== Fashion and performances ===
For "Girls Just Want to Have Fun", Jiggly Caliente and Silky Nutmeg Ganache both wear outfits with animal prints. Jiggly Caliente has tall black boots, a dark wig, and a lollipop. Silky Nutmeg Ganache pulls out glassware, ice, and a bottle of Crown Royal from her outfit to make a drink. For "Point of No Return", Yara Sofia wears a blonde wig and an outfit with a tartan print, part of which she removes. Silky Nutmeg Ganache has a purple wig and removes part of her outfit to reveal pants with blue-and-red fringe. She pours water from a plastic bottle across herself. For "Song for the Lonely", Scarlet Envy wears a purple catsuit, tall boots, and a large brown wig. Silky Nutmeg Ganache has a short red dress and butterfly accessories on her face and wig. She pulls out and twirls a flag.

For "Barbie Girl", Silky Nutmeg Ganache starts with a green outfit, a blonde wig, and a vail over her face. She removes the green cover to reveal a half-female, half-male look. She alternates between the two looks to match the song's female and male vocals. For "Heartbreaker", Jan has a purple outfit with a cape and a brown wig. Silky Nutmeg Ganache starts with a ruffled coat and a large brown wig. She removes the coat and wig to reveal a black-and-blue outfit and a blue wig. She also uses and smashes a fake guitar. For "Focus", Pandora Boxx has a kaftan, black boots, and a blonde wig. Silky Nutmeg Ganache wears a white outfit with matching boots and a brown wig. For "Since U Been Gone", Eureka wears a colorful outfit, sunglasses, her mother's life alert device, and a green wig. Silky Nutmeg Ganache has an inflated outfit and a brown wig. She starts the performance eating potato chips from a plastic bag, then starts to exercise. She struggles to remove the outer covering of her outfit, which gets stuck on her leg.

== Reception ==
Paul McCallion of Vulture rated the episode five out of five stars. Mel Wang of Rolling Stone Philippines said Jiggy Caliente's "Free Your Mind" performance was "fierce". Kevin O’Keeffe included the "Barbie Girl" in Xtra Magazine's list of the ten best lip-syncs of 2021. In 2022, Bernardo Sim of Out said Silky Nutmeg Ganache's performance in the episode earned her the title of "lip sync guru".
