= Mimi Imfurst =

American drag queen (born 1983)

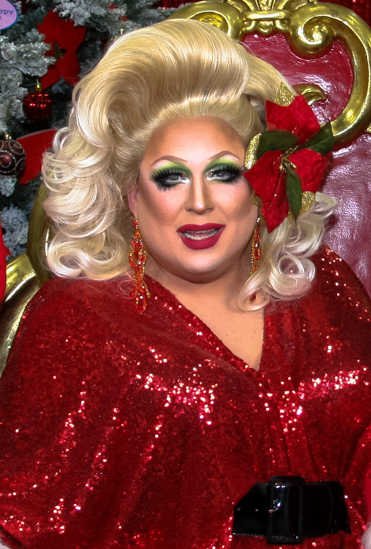
- Imfurst at RuPaul's DragCon in May 2019
- Born: Braden Stewart Chapman; March 2, 1983 (age 43); Hanson, Massachusetts, U.S.
- Education: Marymount Manhattan College
- Occupations: Drag performer, singer-songwriter

Mimi Imfurst (born March 2, 1983), the stage name of Braden Stewart Chapman (or Braden Stewart Maurer-Burns), is an American drag performer. He appeared on the third season of RuPaul's Drag Race and the first season of RuPaul's Drag Race All Stars and was a founding member of the girl group Xelle. In 2017, he became the first U.S. drag queen to perform in Cuba, lip-syncing to Madonna's "Express Yourself" with a group of local dancers.

== Early life ==
Imfurst was born in Hanson, Massachusetts, and raised in Maine from an early age. He had been bullied by his peers and assaulted by a school employee. In his teens, Imfurst was homeless after he was kicked out of his parents' home, allegedly due to his sexuality. He later was adopted by a lesbian couple and started doing drag at the age of 16. Imfurst attended Marymount Manhattan College.

== Career ==
Mimi Imfurst originally went by the drag name Delilah DeMistra, which was inspired by Hedy Lamarr's character in Samson and Delilah.

Mimi Imfurst is perhaps best known for his annual Christmas show where he portrays Jesus's mother Mary, for which he appears in Nick & Norah's Infinite Playlist.

In 2010, Imfurst acted in several Off-Broadway plays, including Boylesque, a parody of the film Burlesque, which opened at the Laurie Beechman Theatre. He also acted in Mayo on Your Breakfast at Tiffany's at the Bowery Poetry Club, Ilja Sapiroe's The Diary of Anne Frankenstein at 13th St. Repertory Theatre, and Thank You for Being a Friend, a parody of The Golden Girls. Imfurst starred in the title role in Rhoda Heartbreak.

Imfurst was featured in the web series Queens of Drag: NYC by gay.com in 2010. The series featured fellow New York drag queens Bianca Del Rio, Dallas DuBois, Hedda Lettuce, Lady Bunny, Peppermint and Sherry Vine.

Mimi Imfurst auditioned three times before becoming a contestant on the third season of RuPaul's Drag Race. He placed high in the first two challenges but was eliminated in the episode "Totally Leotarded" after lifting fellow contestant India Ferrah over his head during their lip-sync. Imfurst was among 12 former contestants brought back for the first season of RuPaul's Drag Race All Stars. He was partnered with Pandora Boxx to form Team Mandora, but was eliminated in the first episode. In the show's fifth season, Jinkx Monsoon impersonated Imfurst for the main challenge during the episode "Lip Synch Extravaganza Eleganza".

In 2011, Imfurst appeared in an Entertainment Weekly photo spread along with Pandora Boxx that featured Melissa McCarthy channeling Divine. Imfurst also appeared on the cover of Next Magazine with Carmen Carrera and Manila Luzon. The same year, Imfurst starred as Rodney in the Off-Broadway play My Big Gay Italian Wedding.

In December 2014, an animated version of Imfurst appeared in the RuPaul's Drag Race: Dragopolis 2.0 mobile app.

Mimi Imfurst has appeared on Celebrity Apprentice and The Howard Stern Show. Imfurst also performs as a stand-up comedian, having opened for Kathy Griffin and Mo'Nique.

In 2017, Mimi became the first American drag queen to perform in Cuba since the embargo.

In May 2018, two Philadelphia performers alleged that Mimi made unwanted advances over Facebook Messenger and said they engaged in sexually explicit role‑play chats because they feared being blacklisted from the local drag scene if they refused. Mimi issued a statement acknowledging initiating late‑night sexual conversations, noting that the exchanges made some people uncomfortable, and apologizing; Mimi stated the chats were believed to be consensual at the time and that the impact was not understood.

== Xelle ==
Xelle (stylized as XELLE, pronounced excel) is an American pop "girl group", originally consisting of members Mimi Imfurst, JC Cassis, and Rony G. The group first met in 2010 when Imfurst hosted a karaoke bash.

For Xelle's first music video "Party Girl," the group started a successful Kickstarter campaign, meeting their goal of $3,000. "Party Girl" was directed by Hilarion Banks and costumes were provided by Geoffrey Mac. "Invincible," Xelle's second single was released on February 14, 2012, with proceeds of the song going to GLSEN. "Invincible" features fan-submitted videos holding signs that deal with victimization and bullying issues.

Xelle's music video for "Queen", dedicated to the late Sahara Davenport, featured appearances by Imfurst's fellow RuPaul's Drag Race contestants Alexis Mateo, Jiggly Caliente, Jujubee, Manila Luzon, Pandora Boxx, Phi Phi O'Hara, Raven, Shannel, Tammie Brown and Yara Sofia. Xelle has appeared on Big Ang and Jersey Couture.

Imfurst departed Xelle in July 2013, with an official statement released by the group on their web page August 1, 2013.

=== Discography ===
Extended plays

- Queens (2012)

Singles

Year	Title	Album
2011	"Party Girl" (feat. Mimi Imfurst)	Queens
2012	"Invincible" (feat. Mimi Imfurst)	Queens
2012	"Queen" (feat. Mimi Imfurst)	Queens
2013	"Hologram" (feat. Mimi Imfurst)	Queens
2013	"Red Flag"	Non-album single
2014	"Sweat"	Non-album single

== Discography ==
=== Singles ===
Year	Title	Album
2013	"Another Lie"	Non-album single
2013	"Sandwich"	Non-album single
2013	"Someone to Screw"	Non-album single

== Filmography ==
=== Film ===
Year	Title	Role	Notes
2008	Nick & Norah's Infinite Playlist	Himself	
2010	Whorrey Potter and the Sorcerer's Balls	Fag Hagrid	
2012	Nous York	Chanteur hôtel de luxe	

=== Television ===
Year	Title	Role	Notes
2010	What Would You Do?	Himself	
2011	One Night Stand Up	Himself	Episode 10: Dragtastic NYC
2011	RuPaul's Drag Race	Himself	11th Place (Eliminated in Episode 3)
2011, 2012	RuPaul's Drag Race: Untucked	Himself	
2011	NewNowNext Awards	Himself	
2012	RuPaul's Drag Race: All Stars	Himself	11th/12th Place (Dual Elimination with Pandora Boxx in Episode 1)
2013	Nurse Jackie		Season 5, Episode 2: "Luck of the Drawing"

=== Web series ===
Year	Title	Role	Notes
2010	Queens of Drag: NYC	Himself	Produced by gay.com

== See also ==
- LGBT culture in New York City
- List of LGBT people from New York City
- NYC Pride March
