= RuPaul's Drag Race All Stars season 6 =

2021 season of RuPaul's Drag Race All Stars

RuPaul's Drag Race All Stars
- Season 6
- Promotional poster for season 6
- Hosted by: RuPaul
- Judges: RuPaul; Michelle Visage; Carson Kressley; Ross Mathews
- No. of contestants: 13
- Winner: Kylie Sonique Love
- Runners-up: Eureka!; Ginger Minj; Ra'Jah O'Hara
- Companion show: RuPaul's Drag Race: Untucked!
- No. of episodes: 12

Release
- Original network: Paramount+; WOW Presents Plus
- Original release: June 24 – September 2, 2021

Season chronology
- ← Previous; Season 5 Next → Season 7

The sixth season of RuPaul's Drag Race All Stars premiered on June 24 and concluded on September 2, 2021. The first two episodes of the season aired on the same day. On August 20, 2020, VH1 renewed both RuPaul's Drag Race and All Stars for its thirteenth and sixth season respectively. On February 24, 2021, ViacomCBS announced the sixth season of the show would move from VH1 to Paramount+, an online streaming service. However, the season is still broadcast by the same networks abroad.

The cast was announced via the RuPaul's Drag Race YouTube channel on May 26, 2021.

The winner of RuPaul's Drag Race All Stars received a one-year supply of Anastasia Beverly Hills Cosmetics and a cash prize of $100,000. Kylie Sonique Love was declared as the winner, with Eureka!, Ginger Minj, and Ra'Jah O'Hara as runners-up.

== Contestants ==
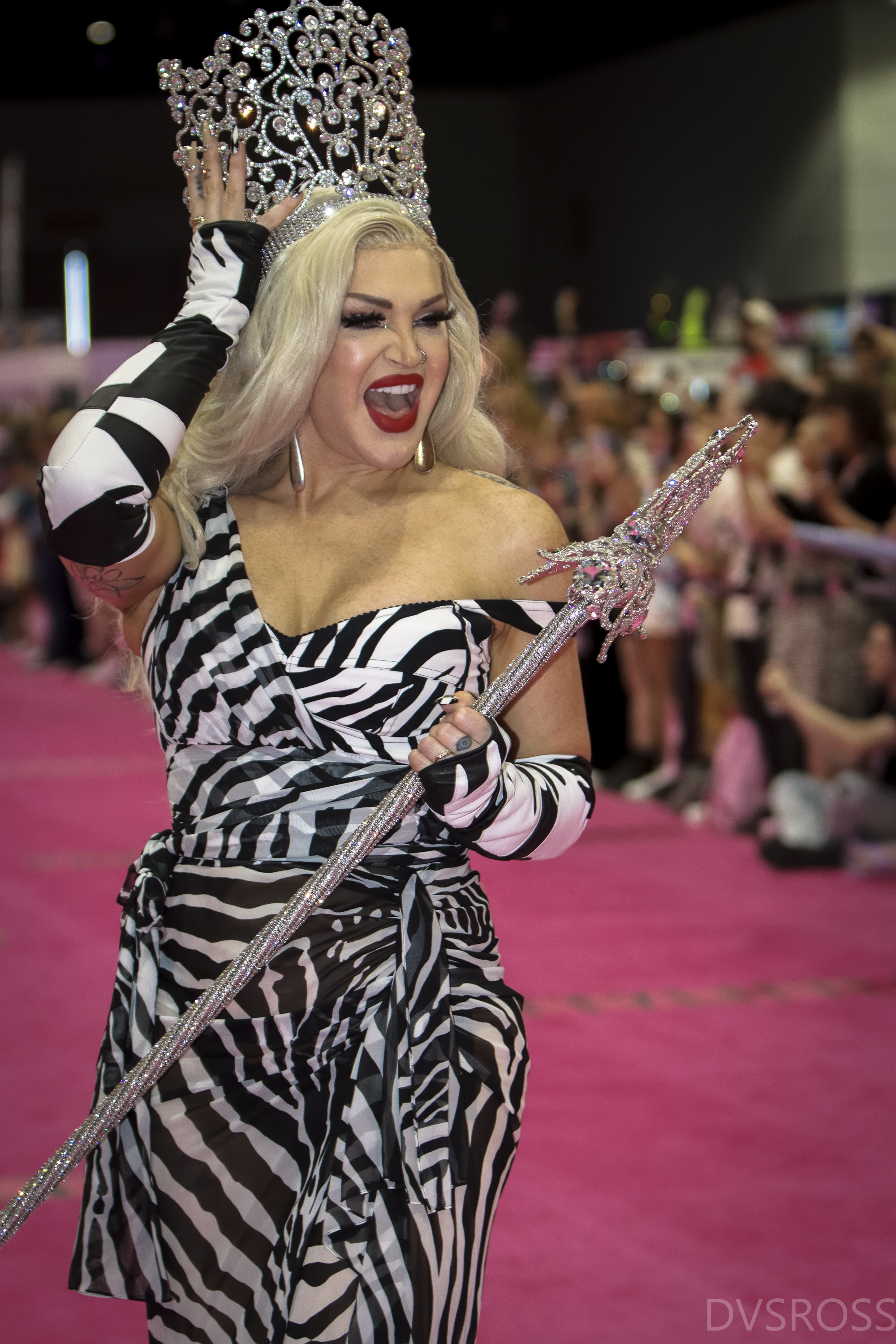
The winner, Kylie Sonique Love

Ages, names, and cities stated are at time of filming.

Contestants of RuPaul's Drag Race All Stars season 6 and their backgrounds
| Contestant | Age | Hometown | Original season(s) | Original placement(s) | Outcome |
|---|---|---|---|---|---|
| Kylie Sonique Love (Note: Kylie Sonique Love is referred to as Sonique on season 2.) | 37 | Los Angeles, California | Season 2 | 9th place | Winner |
| Eureka! (Note: Eureka O'Hara is referred to as Eureka on seasons 9 and 10 and as Eureka! on this one.) | 30 | Los Angeles, California | Season 9 | 11th place | Runners-up (Note: Eureka! placed fifth before re-entering the competition.) |
| Eureka! | 30 | Los Angeles, California | Season 10 | Runner-up | Runners-up |
| Ginger Minj | 35 | Orlando, Florida | Season 7 | Runner-up | Runners-up |
| Ginger Minj | 35 | Orlando, Florida | All Stars 2 | 8th place | Runners-up |
| Ra'Jah O'Hara (Note: Ra'Jah Davenport O'Hara is referred to as Ra'Jah O'Hara on the show.) | 34 | Dallas, Texas | Season 11 | 9th place | Runners-up |
| Trinity K. Bonet (Note: Trinity Kardashian Bonet is referred to as Trinity K. Bonet on the show.) | 29 | Atlanta, Georgia | Season 6 | 7th place | 5th place |
| Pandora Boxx | 48 | Los Angeles, California | Season 2 | 5th place (Note: The contestant was voted Miss Congeniality on her original season.) | 6th place |
| Pandora Boxx | 48 | Los Angeles, California | All Stars 1 | 11th place | 6th place |
| Jan (Note: Jan Sport is referred to as Jan on the show.) | 27 | New York City, New York | Season 12 | 8th place | 7th place |
| A'keria C. Davenport (Note: A'keria Chanel Davenport is referred to as A'keria C. Davenport on the show.) | 32 | Dallas, Texas | Season 11 | 3rd place | 8th place |
| Scarlet Envy | 28 | New York City, New York | Season 11 | 10th place | 9th place |
| Yara Sofia | 36 | Las Vegas, Nevada | Season 3 | 4th place | 10th place |
| Yara Sofia | 36 | Las Vegas, Nevada | All Stars 1 | 5th place | 10th place |
| Silky Nutmeg Ganache | 29 | Los Angeles, California | Season 11 | 3rd place | 11th place |
| Jiggly Caliente | 39 | New York City, New York | Season 4 | 8th place | 12th place |
| Serena ChaCha | 29 | Fort Lauderdale, Florida | Season 5 | 13th place | 13th place |

== Contestant progress ==
Legend:

Kylie Sonique Love won RuPaul's Drag Race All Stars season 6.
Eureka!, Ginger Minj and Ra'Jah O'Hara were the runners-up.
WIN indicates that the contestant won the challenge and the Lip Sync for Your Legacy.
TOP indicates that the contestant won the challenge, but lost the Lip Sync for Your Legacy.
IN indicates that the contestant won the final RuDemption lip sync and re-entered the competition.
SAFE indicates that the contestant was declared safe by the judges.
BTM (Bottom) indicates that the contestant was up for elimination.
ELIM (Eliminated) indicates that the contestant was eliminated.
LOSS indicates that the contestant lost one of the RuDemption lip syncs and did not return to the competition.
QUIT indicates that the contestant did not participate in the RuDemption lip sync and did not return to the competition.
Guest indicates that the contestant returned as a guest.

Contestants progress with placements in each episode
| Contestant | Episode | | | | | | | | | | | |
| Contestant | 1 | 2 | 3 | 4 | 5 | 6 | 7 | 8 | 9 | 10 | 11 | 12 |
|---|---|---|---|---|---|---|---|---|---|---|---|---|
| Kylie Sonique Love | SAFE | SAFE | SAFE | SAFE | BTM | WIN | SAFE | SAFE | BTM | Guest | BTM | Winner |
| Eureka! | SAFE | SAFE | SAFE | SAFE | SAFE | SAFE | SAFE | SAFE | ELIM | IN | WIN | Runner-up |
| Ginger Minj | SAFE | SAFE | BTM | SAFE | WIN | SAFE | SAFE | WIN | BTM | Guest | BTM | Runner-up |
| Ra'Jah O'Hara | SAFE | WIN | SAFE | SAFE | SAFE | BTM | SAFE | SAFE | TOP | Guest | BTM | Runner-up |
| Trinity K. Bonet | BTM | SAFE | TOP | SAFE | SAFE | SAFE | TOP | BTM | BTM | Guest | ELIM | |
| Pandora Boxx | SAFE | SAFE | SAFE | SAFE | SAFE | SAFE | BTM | ELIM | | LOSS | | |
| Jan | SAFE | SAFE | BTM | TOP | BTM | SAFE | ELIM | | | LOSS | | |
| A'keria C. Davenport | SAFE | SAFE | BTM | BTM | SAFE | ELIM | | | | QUIT | | |
| Scarlet Envy | SAFE | SAFE | SAFE | SAFE | ELIM | | | | | LOSS | | |
| Yara Sofia | TOP | BTM | SAFE | ELIM | | | | | | LOSS | | |
| Silky Nutmeg Ganache | SAFE | SAFE | ELIM | | | | | | | LOSS | | |
| Jiggly Caliente | SAFE | ELIM | | | | | | | | LOSS | | |
| Serena ChaCha | ELIM | | | | | | | | | LOSS | | |

== Lip syncs ==
Legend:

The contestant was eliminated after their first time in the bottom.
The contestant was eliminated after their second time in the bottom.
The contestant was eliminated after their third time in the bottom.
The contestant was eliminated after their fourth time in the bottom.
The contestant won the RuDemption lip sync and advanced to the next one.
The contestant won the final RuDemption lip sync and re-entered the competition.
The contestant won the Lip Sync for the Crown and was declared the winner of the season.

| Episode | Top All Star (Elimination) | vs. | Lip Sync Assassin (Elimination) | Song | Winner(s) | Bottom | Eliminated |
|---|---|---|---|---|---|---|---|
| 1 | Yara Sofia (Trinity) | vs. | Coco Montrese (Serena) | "Uptown Funk" (Mark Ronson ft. Bruno Mars) | Coco Montrese | Serena, Trinity | Serena ChaCha |
| 2 | Ra'Jah O'Hara (Jiggly) | vs. | Brooke Lynn Hytes (Jiggly) | "Miss You Much" (Janet Jackson) | Brooke Lynn Hytes | Jiggly, Yara | Jiggly Caliente |
| 2 | Ra'Jah O'Hara (Jiggly) | vs. | Brooke Lynn Hytes (Jiggly) | "Miss You Much" (Janet Jackson) | Ra'Jah O'Hara | Jiggly, Yara | Jiggly Caliente |
| 3 | Trinity K. Bonet (Silky) | vs. | Laganja Estranja (Silky) | "Physical" (Dua Lipa) | Laganja Estranja | A'keria, Ginger, Jan, Silky | Silky Nutmeg Ganache |
| 4 | Jan (A'keria) | vs. | Jessica Wild (Yara) | "Womanizer" (Britney Spears) | Jessica Wild | A'keria, Yara | Yara Sofia |
| 5 | Ginger Minj (Scarlet) | vs. | Mayhem Miller (Jan, Scarlet) | "Phone" (Lizzo) | Ginger Minj | Jan, Kylie, Scarlet | Scarlet Envy |
| 6 | Kylie Sonique Love (A'keria) | vs. | Manila Luzon (A'keria) | "Dirrty" (Christina Aguilera ft. Redman) | Kylie Sonique Love | A'keria, Ra'Jah | A'keria C. Davenport |
| 7 | Trinity K. Bonet (Jan) | vs. | Alexis Mateo (Jan, Pandora) | "Dance Again" (Jennifer Lopez ft. Pitbull) | Alexis Mateo | Jan, Pandora | Jan |
| 8 | Ginger Minj (Pandora) | vs. | Heidi N Closet (Pandora) | "Sugar Walls" (Sheena Easton) | Ginger Minj | Pandora, Trinity | Pandora Boxx |
| 9 | Ra'Jah O'Hara (Eureka!) | vs. | Kameron Michaels (Eureka!) | "Boom Clap" (Charli XCX) | Kameron Michaels | Eureka!, Ginger, Kylie, Trinity | Eureka! |
| Episode | Eliminated contestants | | | Song | Winner | | |
| 10 (Note: The eliminated queens were asked to participate in the RuDemption Lip Sync Smackdown to win re-entry into the competition. Each week, the just-eliminated queen lip-synced with the winner of the previous week’s RuDemption lip sync until one contestant returned.) | Jiggly Caliente | vs. | Serena ChaCha | "Free Your Mind" (En Vogue) | Jiggly Caliente | | |
| 10 | Jiggly Caliente | vs. | Silky Nutmeg Ganache | "Girls Just Want to Have Fun" (Cyndi Lauper) | Silky Nutmeg Ganache | | |
| 10 | Silky Nutmeg Ganache | vs. | Yara Sofia | "Point of No Return" (Exposé) | Silky Nutmeg Ganache | | |
| 10 | Scarlet Envy | vs. | Silky Nutmeg Ganache | "Song for the Lonely" (Cher) | Silky Nutmeg Ganache | | |
| 10 | Silky Nutmeg Ganache (Note: A'keria C. Davenport chose not to participate in the RuDemption Lip Sync Smackdown. Silky Nutmeg Ganache opted to lip-sync alone.) | | | "Barbie Girl" (Aqua) | Silky Nutmeg Ganache | | |
| 10 | Jan | vs. | Silky Nutmeg Ganache | "Heartbreaker" (Pat Benatar) | Silky Nutmeg Ganache | | |
| 10 | Pandora Boxx | vs. | Silky Nutmeg Ganache | "Focus" (Ariana Grande) | Silky Nutmeg Ganache | | |
| 10 | Eureka! | vs. | Silky Nutmeg Ganache | "Since U Been Gone" (Kelly Clarkson) | Eureka! | | |
| Episode | Top All Star (Elimination) | vs. | Lip Sync Assassin (Elimination) | Song | Winners | Bottom | Eliminated |
| 11 | Eureka! (Trinity) | vs. | Jaida Essence Hall (Trinity) | "Good Golly, Miss Molly" (Little Richard) | Eureka! | Ginger, Kylie, Ra'Jah, Trinity | Trinity K. Bonet |
| 11 | Eureka! (Trinity) | vs. | Jaida Essence Hall (Trinity) | "Good Golly, Miss Molly" (Little Richard) | Jaida Essence Hall | Ginger, Kylie, Ra'Jah, Trinity | Trinity K. Bonet |
| Episode | Final All Stars | | | Song | Winner | | |
| 12 | Eureka! vs. Ginger Minj vs. Kylie Sonique Love vs. Ra'Jah O'Hara | | | "Stupid Love" (Lady Gaga) | Kylie Sonique Love | | |

== Voting history ==
Legend:

The Top All Star won the Lip Sync for Your Legacy.
The Lip Sync Assassin won the Lip Sync for Your Legacy.
The Lip Sync Assassin won the Lip Sync for Your Legacy, but due to a tie in the group's vote, the Top All Star determined the elimination.
The contestant was up for elimination, but not eliminated.
The eliminated queen's vote.
The elimination was determined by the Top All Star, having they won the Lip Sync for Your Legacy.
The elimination was determined by the group's vote, having the Lip Sync Assassin won the Lip Sync for Your Legacy.
The elimination was determined by both the group and the Top All Star's votes, having the lip sync resulted in a tie.
The elimination was determined by the Top All Star due to a tie in the group's vote after the Lip Sync Assassin won the Lip Sync for Your Legacy.

Summary of weekly voting and results
| Episode | 1 | 2 | 3 | 4 | 5 | 6 | 7 | 8 | 9 | 11 |
|---|---|---|---|---|---|---|---|---|---|---|
| Deciding vote | Group | Ra'Jah | Group | Group | Ginger | Kylie | Trinity (Note: In episode 7, although Trinity lost the Lip Sync for Your Legacy, her vote was used to break the tie resulted from the group's votes.) | Ginger | Group | Eureka! |
| Deciding vote | Group | Group | Group | Group | Ginger | Kylie | Trinity | Ginger | Group | Group |
| Kylie | Serena | Jiggly | Silky | Yara | ~~Scarlet~~ | A'keria | Jan | ~~Pandora~~ | Eureka! | Trinity |
| Eureka! | Serena | Jiggly | A'keria | Yara | ~~Jan~~ | ~~A'keria~~ | Pandora | ~~Pandora~~ | Trinity | Trinity |
| Ginger | Serena | Jiggly | A'keria | Yara | Scarlet | ~~A'keria~~ | Pandora | Pandora | Eureka! | Trinity |
| Ra'Jah | Serena | Jiggly | A'keria | Yara | ~~Jan~~ | ~~A'keria~~ | Jan | ~~Pandora~~ | ~~Eureka!~~ | Trinity |
| Trinity | Serena | Yara | ~~Silky~~ | Yara | ~~Jan~~ | ~~A'keria~~ | Jan | ~~Pandora~~ | Eureka! | Ra'Jah |
| Pandora | Serena | Jiggly | Silky | Yara | ~~Scarlet~~ | A'keria | Jan | ~~Trinity~~ | | |
| Jan | Serena | Jiggly | Silky | ~~A'keria~~ | ~~Scarlet~~ | ~~A'keria~~ | Pandora | | | |
| A'keria | Serena | Jiggly | Silky | Yara | ~~Scarlet~~ | ~~Ra'Jah~~ | | | | |
| Scarlet | Serena | Jiggly | Silky | Yara | ~~Jan~~ | | | | | |
| Yara | ~~Trinity~~ | Jiggly | Silky | A'keria | | | | | | |
| Silky | Serena | Jiggly | A'keria | | | | | | | |
| Jiggly | Serena | Yara | | | | | | | | |
| Serena | Trinity | | | | | | | | | |
| Eliminated | Serena | Jiggly | Silky | Yara | Scarlet | A'keria | Jan | Pandora | Eureka! | Trinity |

== Guest judges ==
Listed in chronological order:

- Big Freedia, rapper
- Tia Mowry, actress
- Jamal Sims, choreographer
- Aisha Tyler, actress and comedian
- Emma Roberts, actress and singer
- Zaldy, fashion designer
- Tina Knowles, businesswoman and fashion designer
- Charli XCX, English singer and songwriter
- Justin Simien, filmmaker and actor

=== Special guests ===
Guests who appeared in episodes, but did not judge on the main stage.

Episode 1

- Miss Piggy (Eric Jacobson), Muppet character

Episode 5

- Bianca Del Rio, drag queen, winner of the sixth season of RuPaul's Drag Race

Episode 6

- Angela Bassett, actress and director

Episode 7

- Leland, songwriter and record producer
- Freddy Scott, composer and actor

Episode 8

- Cheyenne Jackson, actor and singer
- Fortune Feimster, writer, comedian and actress

Episode 9

- Bianca Del Rio as Dina Saur from Drag Tots
- Latrice Royale as Lady Liber-T from Drag Tots

Episode 11

- Alec Mapa, actor and comedian
- Jermaine Fowler, actor and writer

Episode 12

- Tanya Tucker, singer
- Jamal Sims, choreographer
- Shea Couleé, drag queen, winner of the fifth season of RuPaul's Drag Race All Stars

== Episodes ==
| No. overall | No. in season | Title | Original release date |
|---|---|---|---|
| 42 | 1 | "All Star Variety Extravaganza" | June 24, 2021 |
Thirteen All Stars enter the workroom. For the mini-challenge, the queens must read each other. Ginger Minj wins the mini-challenge. For the main challenge, the queens must perform a talent show in front of the judges.: A'keria C. Davenport: Lip sync performance; Eureka!: Live singing; Ginger Minj: Live singing; Jan: Live singing; Jiggly Caliente: Lip sync performance; Kylie Sonique Love: Live singing; Pandora Boxx: Lip sync performance; Ra'Jah O'Hara: Speed sewing; Scarlet Envy: Bubble burlesque; Serena ChaCha: Lip sync performance; Silky Nutmeg Ganache: Piano playing and singing; Trinity K. Bonet: Stand-up comedy; Yara Sofia: Lip sync performance; On the runway, Ru tells the queens that the All Stars rules from last season will be in effect this season as well. Pandora Boxx, Ra'Jah O'Hara and Yara Sofia receive positive critiques, with Yara being the Top All Star of the week. Serena ChaCha, Silky Nutmeg Ganache and Trinity K. Bonet receive negative critiques, with Serena and Trinity being the bottom two queens. It is then revealed that Season 5 and All Stars 2 contestant Coco Montrese is this week's Lip Sync Assassin. Yara and Coco lip-sync to "Uptown Funk" by Mark Ronson ft. Bruno Mars. Coco Montrese wins the lip sync and reveals that the group has chosen to eliminate Serena ChaCha from the competition.: Mini-challenge: Reading Is Fundamental; Mini-challenge winner: Ginger Minj; Mini-challenge prize: $2,500 gift card from ISLYNYC; Maxi challenge: Perform a talent show in front of the judges.; Maxi challenge winner: Yara Sofia; Maxi challenge prize: Seven-nights stay at a luxury villa in Italy, courtesy of MyGayGetaway; Lip Sync Assassin: Coco Montrese; Lip sync song: "Uptown Funk" by Mark Ronson ft. Bruno Mars; Lip Sync for Your Legacy winner: Coco Montrese; Bottom two: Serena ChaCha and Trinity K. Bonet; Eliminated: Serena ChaCha; Farewell message: "ChaCha, echa pa' fuera and buy some wigs. XOXO Serena ChaCha"
| 43 | 2 | "The Blue Ball" | June 24, 2021 |
Yara Sofia reveals that she would have eliminated Trinity K. Bonet from the competition, had she won the lip sync. For the main challenge, the queens will present three looks on the runway for the Blue Ball, with categories being Blue Betta Werk, Blue Jean Baby and Blue Ball Bonanza. On the runway, Eureka!, Kylie Sonique Love and Ra'Jah O'Hara receive positive critiques, with Ra'Jah being the Top All Star of the week. A'keria C. Davenport, Jiggly Caliente and Yara Sofia receive negative critiques, with Jiggly and Yara being the bottom two of the week. It is then revealed that Season 11's runner-up Brooke Lynn Hytes is this week's Lip Sync Assassin. Ra'Jah and Brooke Lynn lip-sync to "Miss You Much" by Janet Jackson. After an amazing lip sync, Ru announces both queens the winners of the lip sync. Brooke Lynn reveals that the group has voted to eliminate Jiggly Caliente. Ra'Jah also reveals Jiggly's lipstick, therefore sending the latter home.: Guest judge: Big Freedia; Maxi challenge: The Blue Ball; Runway themes: Blue Betta Werk, Blue Jean Baby and Blue Ball Bonanza; Maxi challenge winner: Ra'Jah O'Hara; Maxi challenge prize: $5,000, courtesy of Planet Pepper and $5,000 worth of Orbucks from Orbitz; Lip Sync Assassin: Brooke Lynn Hytes; Lip sync song: "Miss You Much" by Janet Jackson; Lip Sync for Your Legacy winners: Brooke Lynn Hytes and Ra'Jah O'Hara; Bottom two: Jiggly Caliente and Yara Sofia; Eliminated: Jiggly Caliente; Farewell message: "It's been REAL! You may call me Jiggly!"
| 44 | 3 | "Side Hustles" | July 1, 2021 |
For this week's main challenge, the queens will team up and write and star in a commercial that promotes their side hustle. Team 1 consists of A'keria C. Davenport, Ginger Minj, Jan and Silky Nutmeg Ganache. Their side hustle is Rent-a-Queen. Team 2 consists of Pandora Boxx, Ra'Jah O'Hara, Trinity K. Bonet and Yara Sofia. Their side hustle is Drag Fixers. Team 3 consists of Eureka!, Kylie Sonique Love and Scarlet Envy. Their side hustle is Drag Exorcists. On the runway, the queens must redeem a look that they wore in their previous season. Team 2 is considered the winning team, with Trinity K. Bonet being the Top All Star of the week. Team 3 is critiqued and deemed safe. Team 1 receives all negative critiques, with all four of the queens being the bottom four queens. It is revealed that Season 6's Laganja Estranja is this week's Lip Sync Assassin. After a jaw-dropping performance, Laganja Estranja is announced the winner and reveals that the group has chosen to eliminate Silky Nutmeg Ganache from the competition.: Guest judge: Tia Mowry; Maxi challenge: Write and star in a commercial that promotes their side hustle; Runway theme: Rudemption Runway; Maxi challenge winner: Trinity K. Bonet; Maxi challenge prize: $5,000 and $5,000 worth of Orbucks from Orbitz; Lip Sync Assassin: Laganja Estranja; Lip sync song: "Physical" by Dua Lipa; Lip Sync for Your Legacy winner: Laganja Estranja; Bottom four: A'keria C. Davenport, Ginger Minj, Jan, and Silky Nutmeg Ganache; Eliminated: Silky Nutmeg Ganache; Farewell message: "#AllBlackLivesMatter #TransLivesMatter"
| 45 | 4 | "Halftime Headliners" | July 8, 2021 |
Trinity K. Bonet reveals she would have eliminated Silky Nutmeg Ganache from the competition, had she won the lip sync. For the main challenge, the queens will perform in the All Stars 6 Hall of Fame Halftime Show. Each queen will perform as a celebrity and perform a live medley of RuPaul songs.: A'keria C. Davenport as Prince; Eureka! as Madonna; Ginger Minj as Fergie; Jan - Lady Gaga; Kylie Sonique Love as Steven Tyler; Pandora Boxx as Carol Channing; Ra'Jah O'Hara as Diana Ross; Scarlet Envy as Katy Perry; Trinity K. Bonet as Beyoncé; Yara Sofia as Shakira; On the runway, category is The Frill of It All. Eureka!, Jan and Trinity K. Bonet receive positive critiques, with Jan being the Top All Star of the week. A'keria C. Davenport, Ginger Minj and Yara Sofia receive negative critiques, with A'keria and Yara being the bottom two queens. It is revealed that Season 2's Jessica Wild is this week's Lip Sync Assassin. Her and Jan lip-sync to "Womanizer" by Britney Spears. Jessica Wild wins the lip sync and reveals that the group has chosen to eliminate Yara Sofia from the competition.: Guest judge: Jamal Sims; Maxi challenge: All Stars 6 Hall of Fame Half-Time Show; Runway theme: The Frill of It All; Maxi challenge winner: Jan; Maxi challenge prize: $5,000, courtesy of Mane Club and $5,000 worth of Orbucks from Orbitz; Lip Sync Assassin: Jessica Wild; Lip sync song: "Womanizer" by Britney Spears; Lip Sync for Your Legacy winner: Jessica Wild; Bottom two: A'keria C. Davenport and Yara Sofia; Eliminated: Yara Sofia; Farewell message: "Fuck You All! I'm kidding HAHAHA You Guys are Hilarious ✡✡✡ Yara Sofia"
| 46 | 5 | "Pink Table Talk" | July 15, 2021 |
Jan reveals she would have eliminated A'keria C. Davenport from the competition, had she won the lip sync. For the main challenge, the queens will team up and host a talk show called "Pink Table Talk". Team 1 consists of A'keria C. Davenport, Eureka! and Trinity K. Bonet, and their topic is about Sex. Team 2 consists of Kylie Sonique Love, Ra'Jah O'Hara and Scarlet Envy, and their topic is about Motherhood. Team 3 consists of Ginger Minj, Jan and Pandora Boxx, and their topic is about Body. On the runway, category is Clash of the Patterns. Team 1 is declared the winning team, however, RuPaul announces that her favorite performance was from Ginger Minj, announcing her as the Top All Star of the week. Jan, Kylie Sonique Love and Scarlet Envy receive negative critiques, with all three being the bottom queens of the week. Season 6 winner Bianca Del Rio initially appears as a joke, before it is revealed that Season 10 and All Stars 5's Mayhem Miller is this week's true Lip Sync Assassin. Her and Ginger Minj lip-sync to "Phone" by Lizzo. Ginger wins the lip sync and eliminates Scarlet Envy from the competition.: Guest judge: Aisha Tyler; Maxi challenge: Host a talk show called "Pink Table Talk"; Runway theme: Clash of the Patterns; Maxi challenge: Ginger Minj; Maxi challenge prize: $5,000; Lip Sync Assassin: Mayhem Miller; Lip sync song: "Phone" by Lizzo; Lip Sync for Your Legacy winner: Ginger Minj; Bottom three: Jan, Kylie Sonique Love, and Scarlet Envy; Eliminated: Scarlet Envy; Farewell message: "Bubbles pop. Keep blowing. Love, Scarlet"
| 47 | 6 | "Rumerican Horror Story: Coven Girls" | July 22, 2021 |
For the main challenge the queens will act in a parody of American Horror Story called RuMerican Horror Story: Coven Girls. The roles are as follows: A'keria C. Davenport as Gabby; Eureka! as Kathy Bates; Ginger Minj as Emma; Jan as Leia; Kylie Sonique Love as Jessica; Pandora Boxx as Frances and Joan Crawford; Ra'Jah O'Hara and Trinity K. Bonet as Sarah and Angela, the conjoined twins; On the runway, category is Oh My Goth!. Ginger Minj, Jan and Kylie Sonique Love receive positive critiques, with Kylie being the Top All Star of the week. A'keria C. Davenport, Eureka! and Ra'Jah O'Hara receive negative critiques, with A'keria and Ra'Jah being the bottom two queens of the week. It is revealed that Season 3, All Stars 1 and All Stars 4's Manila Luzon is this week's Lip Sync Assassin. Kylie Sonique Love and Manila Luzon lip-sync to "Dirrty" by Christina Aguilera ft. Redman. Kylie wins the lip sync and eliminates A'keria C. Davenport from the competition.: Guest judge: Emma Roberts; Maxi challenge: Act in RuMerican Horror Story: Coven Girls; Runway theme: Oh My Goth!; Maxi challenge winner: Kylie Sonique Love; Maxi challenge prize: Seven-nights vacation in southern Italy; Lip Sync Assassin: Manila Luzon; Lip sync song: "Dirrty" by Christina Aguilera ft. Redman; Lip Sync for Your Legacy winner: Kylie Sonique Love; Bottom two: A'keria C. Davenport and Ra'Jah O'Hara; Eliminated: A'keria C. Davenport; Farewell message: "I AM THE MOOD + THE MOMENT! The light is 4EVA bright Miz A$$ Almighty"
| 48 | 7 | "Show Up Queen" | July 29, 2021 |
For this week's main challenge, the queens will write their own verse to "Show Up Queen" in teams. Team 1 consists of Eureka!, Ginger Minj and Kylie Sonique Love. Team 2 consists of Jan, Pandora Boxx, Ra'Jah O'Hara and Trinity K. Bonet. On the runway, category is Hot Tropics. Eureka!, Ginger Minj, Kylie Sonique Love, Ra'Jah O'Hara and Trinity K. Bonet receive positive critiques, with Trinity being the Top All Star of the week. Jan and Pandora Boxx receive negative critiques and both are the bottom two queens of the week. It is revealed that Season 3, All Stars 1 and All Stars 5's Alexis Mateo is this week's Lip Sync Assassin. Trinity K. Bonet and Alexis Mateo lip-sync to "Dance Again" by Jennifer Lopez ft. Pitbull. Alexis wins the lip sync. She reveals that the group vote is tied between Jan and Pandora Boxx. RuPaul then explains that since the group vote was tied, the deciding vote would be the Top All Star's one. Trinity then reveals she wanted to eliminate Jan from the competition.: Guest judge: Zaldy; Maxi challenge: In groups, write your own verse to "Show Up Queen"; Runway theme: Hot Tropics; Maxi challenge winner: Trinity K. Bonet; Maxi challenge prize: $5,000, courtesy of Snag Tights; Lip Sync Assassin: Alexis Mateo; Lip sync song: "Dance Again" by Jennifer Lopez ft. Pitbull; Lip Sync for Your Legacy winner: Alexis Mateo; Bottom two: Jan and Pandora Boxx; Eliminated: Jan; Farewell message: "I love you all SO much. Thank you for loving, supporting and caring for me. You're all SO special. I'm SO proud of you all. Keep slaying! I bow to you all! NOT THIS."
| 49 | 8 | "Snatch Game of Love" | August 5, 2021 |
For the main challenge, the queens will play the Snatch Game of Love. The queens will be vying for the love of special guest judges Cheyenne Jackson and Fortune Feimster Vying for Cheyenne Jackson's love are: Ginger Minj as Phyllis Diller; Kylie Sonique Love as Dolly Parton; Trinity K. Bonet as Whitney Houston; Vying for Fortune Feimster's love are: Eureka! as Divine; Pandora Boxx as Kim Cattrall; Ra'Jah O'Hara as La Toya Jackson; On the runway, category is Pop Art. Eureka!, Ginger Minj and Kylie Sonique Love receive positive critiques, with Ginger being the Top All Star of the week. Pandora Boxx and Trinity K. Bonet receive negative critiques and are the bottom two queens of the week. It is announced that Season 12's Heidi N Closet is this week's Lip Sync Assassin. Ginger and Heidi lip-sync to "Sugar Walls" by Sheena Easton. Ginger Minj wins the lip sync and decides to eliminate Pandora Boxx from the competition.: Guest judge: Tina Knowles; Snatch Game of Love guests: Cheyenne Jackson and Fortune Feimster; Maxi challenge: Impersonate celebrities for the game show "Snatch Game of Love"; Runway theme: Pop Art; Maxi challenge winner: Ginger Minj; Maxi challenge prize: $5,000, courtesy of Barefoot Wine; Lip Sync Assassin: Heidi N Closet; Lip sync song: "Sugar Walls" by Sheena Easton; Lip Sync for Your Legacy winner: Ginger Minj; Bottom two: Pandora Boxx and Trinity K. Bonet; Eliminated: Pandora Boxx; Farewell message: "It was lovely working with most of you! *wink* So long, and thanks for all the fish. ♥ Pandora"
| 50 | 9 | "Drag Tots" | August 12, 2021 |
For this week's mini-challenge, the queens will vote in a series of class superlatives. Ginger Minj and Kylie Sonique Love win the mini-challenge. For the main challenge, the queens are tasked to transform themselves into magical live-action characters, that pay a visit to Drag Tots. The characters are as follows: Eureka! as Alexandria McQueen; Ginger Minj as Taralynn Dubois Devereaux Belle Jr. III (Tara Belle); Kylie Sonique Love as Miss Behave; Ra'Jah O'Hara as I'Siya Queen; Trinity K. Bonet as Fierce Furlicia the Feline; On the runway, Ra'Jah O'Hara is announced the Top All Star of the week. It is then revealed that for the remainder of the competition the queens that do not win the challenge will all be up for elimination. It is revealed that Season 10's Kameron Michaels is this week's Lip Sync Assassin. Ra'Jah and Kameron lip-sync to "Boom Clap" by Charli XCX. Kameron Michaels wins the lip sync and reveals that the group has chosen to eliminate Eureka! from the competition.: Guest judge: Charli XCX; Mini-challenge: All Star Class Superlatives; Mini-challenge winners: Ginger Minj and Kylie Sonique Love; Mini-challenge prize: $1,000 tip, courtesy of the United States Department of Education; Maxi challenge: Create a magical live-action character; Maxi challenge winner: Ra'Jah O'Hara; Maxi challenge prize: $5,000; Lip Sync Assassin: Kameron Michaels; Lip sync song: "Boom Clap" by Charli XCX; Lip Sync for Your Legacy winner: Kameron Michaels; Bottom four: Eureka!, Ginger Minj, Kylie Sonique Love and Trinity K. Bonet; Eliminated: Eureka!; Farewell message: "Kylie: You're the best and most beautiful spirit. Ra'Jah: Your heart is pure gold. Trinity: You're a fighter in the best way, NEVER STOP. Ginger: You're a star and a big girl ICON. What an amazing top 4. You're all weiners to me! ♥ Eureka"
| 51 | 10 | "Rudemption Lip-Sync Smackdown" | August 19, 2021 |
After Eureka's elimination, the four remaining queens find out that the previously eliminated queens have been participating in the RuDemption Lip Sync Smackdown, in order to return to the competition. Each week, after their elimination, the contestants have been lip-syncing to fight their way back into the competition. The Top Four then watches how all the lip syncs went down. After beating Serena ChaCha in the first round, Jiggly Caliente lip-syncs against Silky Nutmeg Ganache. Silky wins the lip sync against Jiggly and continues to win the lip syncs against Yara Sofia, Scarlet Envy, Jan, and Pandora Boxx. A'keria C. Davenport chose not to participate in the smackdown. In the final lip sync, Eureka! and Silky battle each other, but the result will only be revealed the next week.
| 52 | 11 | "The Charisma, Uniqueness, Nerve and Talent Monologues" | August 26, 2021 |
After the camera feed cuts out, the queens find out that Eureka! rejoins them in the competition. For the mini-challenge, the queens will do a pride photoshoot. Kylie Sonique Love wins the mini-challenge. For the main challenge, the queens are tasked to write and perform a monologue, in which they tell a story about their life as drag queens. On the runway, category is Oops, I Did It Again - "A Fashionable Fashion Fail". It is revealed that Eureka! is the Top All Star of the week, leaving Ginger Minj, Kylie Sonique Love, Ra'Jah O'Hara and Trinity K. Bonet as the bottom four queens of the week. It is revealed that Season 12 winner Jaida Essence Hall is this week's Lip Sync Assassin. Eureka! and Jaida lip-sync to "Good Golly, Miss Molly" by Little Richard. Both Eureka! and Jaida Essence Hall are declared winners. Eureka! reveals she has chosen to eliminate Trinity K. Bonet and Jaida reveals the group has also voted to eliminate Trinity from the competition.: Returned: Eureka!; Guest judge: Justin Simien; Mini-challenge: Pride quick drag photoshoot; Mini-challenge winner: Kylie Sonique Love; Mini-challenge prize: Levi's 2021 Pride collection; Maxi challenge: Write and perform a Charisma, Uniqueness, Nerve and Talent monologue; Runway theme: Oops, I Did It Again - "A Fashionable Fashion Fail"; Maxi challenge winner: Eureka!; Maxi challenge prize: $5,000, courtesy of Levi's; Lip Sync Assassin: Jaida Essence Hall; Lip sync song: "Good Golly, Miss Molly" by Little Richard; Lip Sync for Your Legacy winners: Eureka! and Jaida Essence Hall; Bottom four: Ginger Minj, Kylie Sonique Love, Ra'Jah O'Hara and Trinity K. Bonet; Eliminated: Trinity K. Bonet; Farewell Message: "What a Fantastic 4! yalls NUM 1 FAN! T.K.B"
| 53 | 12 | "This Is Our Country" | September 2, 2021 |
For the final main challenge of the season, the final four queens are tasked to write and perform their own verse to RuPaul and Tanya Tucker's new song "This Is Our Country". The queens then walk the runway one last time. It is revealed that all four of them will be lip-syncing to "Stupid Love" by Lady Gaga. Kylie Sonique Love is then declared the winner, leaving Eureka!, Ginger Minj and Ra'Jah O'Hara as the runners-up.: Maxi challenge: Write, record, and perform a verse to RuPaul's song "This Is Our Country"; Runway theme: All Star Hall of Fame Eleganza Extravaganza; Lip sync song: "Stupid Love" by Lady Gaga; Runners-up: Eureka!, Ginger Minj and Ra'Jah O'Hara; Winner of RuPaul's Drag Race All Stars season 6: Kylie Sonique Love
