= Whorrey Potter and the Sorcerer's Balls =

- Directed by: Dominic Ford
- Written by: Dominic Ford
- Based on: Harry Potter and the Sorcerer's Stone by Steve Kloves; Harry Potter and the Sorcerer's Stone by J.K. Rowling
- Produced by: Dominic Ford
- Starring: Cameron Adams; Eddie Diaz; Mimi Imfurst; Luke Marcum; Daniel Nardicio; Ryan Raz; Matthew Rush; Robert Van Damme
- Cinematography: Dominic Ford
- Edited by: Dominic Ford
- Music by: Dominic Ford
- Production company: Dominic Ford Features
- Distributed by: Dominic Ford
- Release dates: February 20, 2010 (CineKink); March 29, 2010 (U.S.)
- Running time: 74 minutes
- Country: United States
- Language: English

Whorrey Potter and the Sorcerer's Balls is a 2010 American 3D gay pornographic fantasy adventure comedy film directed by Dominic Ford. It is a parody of the 2001 film Harry Potter and the Sorcerer's Stone, which is based on the novel Harry Potter and the Philosopher's Stone by J.K. Rowling. It is the first 3D gay pornographic film. The film stars Cameron Adams, Eddie Diaz, Mimi Imfurst, Luke Marcum, Daniel Nardicio, Ryan Raz, Matthew Rush, and Robert Van Damme.

== Plot ==
Whorrey Potter is a young gay man who lives with his abusive family members. To cope with them, Whorrey goes to his room, has a dream, and begins to masturbate. A drag queen named Fag Hagrid appears in his bedroom and tells him that he is a wizard and has been accepted into Cockwarts Academy, a castle and school for wizards. Fag Hagrid takes Whorrey to Diaphram Alley, a marketplace that sells magical objects and contains international locations, to get school supplies. After buying a wand, he goes to Cockwarts and befriends fellow wizards, Himmione Grainghim and Ron Weasy. After learning spells from Professor Queerell, Whorrey receives an invisibility cloak and the trio discover that Professor Queerell is planning on stealing the Sorcerer's Balls. They ask Fag Hagrid what it is and she explains that they contain liquid which grants the drinker immortality and that it is guarded in the school. Fag Hagrid tells them how to avoid the guard. Ron uses the invisibility cloak and reveals his penis. The Guard sees him and begins performing oral sex on him. Himmione opens a door to a chamber by resting onto a dildo. Whorrey enters the chamber, goes to the Mirror of Desire, takes the Sorcerer's Balls and encounters Professor Queerell who reveals the spirit of an evil wizard named Lord Voldemorecock has been on the back of his head. Lord Voldemorecock casts a spell on Whorrey and they have sex. Himmione later has sex with the Guard and Lord Voldemorecock has sex with Ron. Himmione casts a levitation spell on himself, Whorrey, and Ron and they have a threesome.

== Cast ==
- Luke Marcum as Whorrey Potter
- Mimi Imfurst as Fag Hagrid
- Cameron Adams as Himmione Grainghim
- Eddie Diaz as Ron Weasy
- Daniel Nardicio as Clerk Kent
- Matthew Rush as Lord Voldemorecock
- Ryan Raz as Professor Queerell
- Robert Van Damme as The Guard

== Production ==
The film was shot in Budapest, Stockholm, London, New York and Fire Island. Production took place in 2009. The film was filmed in 3D and used green screens.

== Reception ==
The film was noted as a parody of the Harry Potter universe. The film also attracted indirect attention when Emma Watson, who played one of the characters in the original film series, was reported having enjoyed meeting the actor who plays the parody version of her role. The Chicago Tribune mentioned the title of the film in a reflexion about the weight of porn in men's fantasies. Le Journal de Montréal evoked the film as an example in the trend of porn parodies and translates the title in French as "Potter le putassier et les boules du sorcier"

=== Accolades ===
Award	Date of ceremony	Category	Recipients	Result	Ref.
GAYVN Awards	September 24, 2010	Best Actor	Luke Marcum	Nominated	
