= Pandora Boxx =

American drag queen (born 1972)

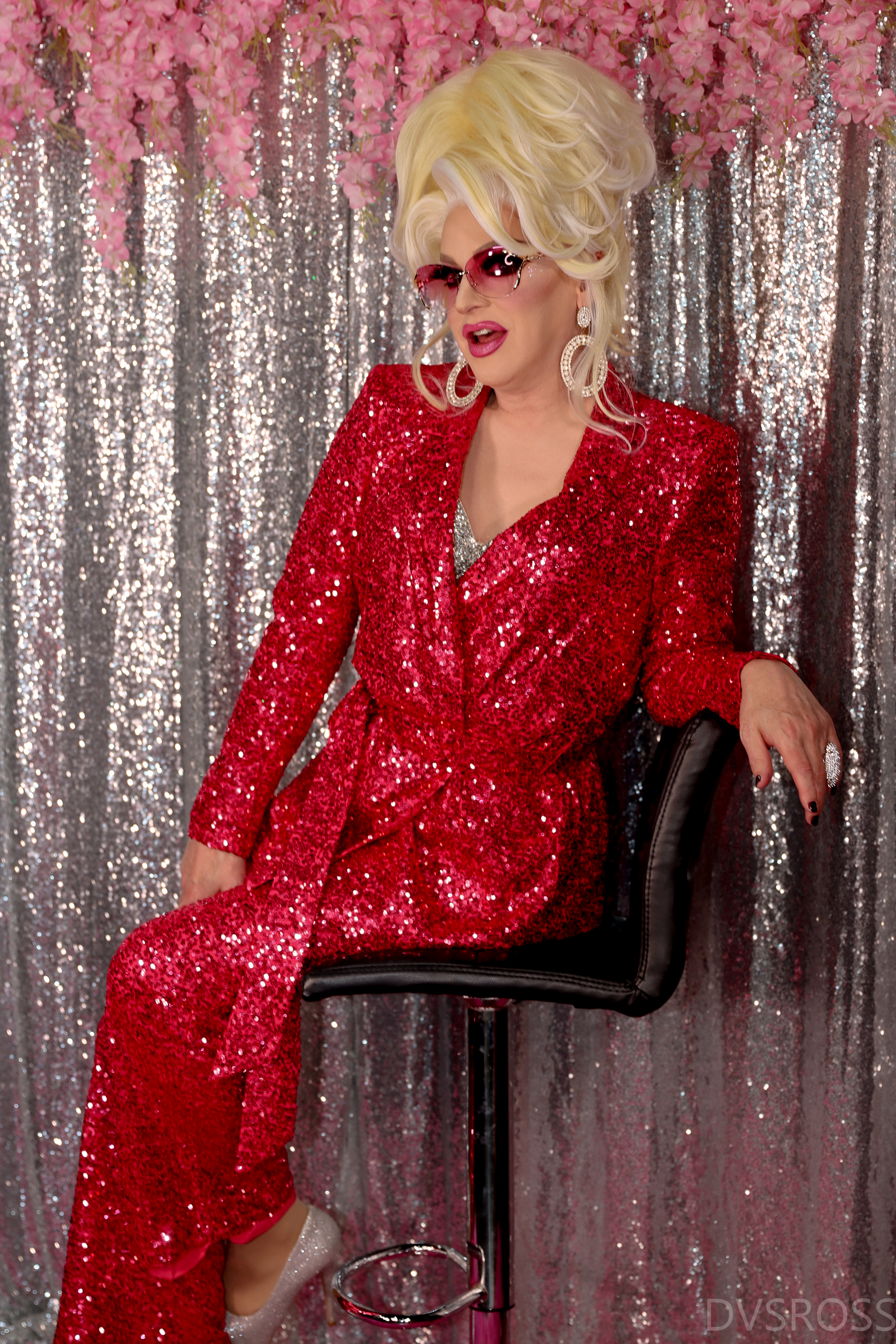
- Pandora Boxx in 2023
- Born: Michael R. Steck; May 2, 1972 (age 54); Jamestown, New York, U.S.
- Education: St. John Fisher University
- Occupations: Drag queen; reality television personality; comedian; singer; actress
- Years active: 1997–present
- Known for: RuPaul's Drag Race (season 2)
- Title: Miss Congeniality
- Predecessor: Nina Flowers
- Successor: Yara Sofia
- Spouse: Ian Dinse (m. 2022)
- Website: www.pandoraboxx.com

Michael Steck (born May 2, 1972), better known by the stage name Pandora Boxx, is an American drag queen, comedian, reality television personality, and singer. Hailing from Rochester, New York, Boxx competed in the second season of RuPaul's Drag Race, placing fifth and winning the title of Miss Congeniality, and subsequently returned for the first and sixth seasons of RuPaul's Drag Race All Stars. Boxx also appeared in all three seasons of the Drag Race spin-off series RuPaul's Drag U. Outside of reality television, Pandora Boxx has released several singles and performed in film, television, and theater.

== Early life ==
Michael Steck was born to Sharon Steck in Jamestown, New York. He has a sister, Susanne. The family later moved to Olean, New York. Steck graduated from Canandaigua Academy in 1991. Steck was inspired to do drag after watching the eventual season six contestant Darienne Lake perform at an outdoor festival in Rochester, New York. For his first show at the gay bar Infinity in Rochester, Steck chose his drag name as a play on words of Pandora's box, an artifact found in Greek mythology.

== Career ==
In 2008, Boxx wrote, directed, produced, and appeared in Mrs. Kasha Davis: The Life of an International Housewife Celebrity, starring fellow drag performer from Rochester's Tilt nightclub, Mrs. Kasha Davis. She also wrote a play, The Lipstick Massacre, which was directed by David Henderson, starred Boxx and Mrs. Kasha Davis, and premiered in November 2009 in Rochester. The plot follows a commercial actress, Daphne Von Hausenpfeffer, a fading commercial actress who becomes the prime suspect when other actresses auditioning for the same roles begin to disappear.

Boxx auditioned twice before becoming a contestant on the second season of RuPaul's Drag Race, which aired in 2010. While on the show, she impersonated Carol Channing on "Snatch Game", a Match Game parody challenge. Performing well in the show's challenges, her failure to win one resulted in RuPaul calling her "the Susan Lucci of this competition." She was eliminated in the eighth episode, "Golden Gals". After her elimination, Entertainment Weekly called her their pick for "America's Next Drag Superstar". She was later voted the Miss Congeniality of her season.

After her elimination, Boxx appeared on the three seasons of the Drag Race spin-off series RuPaul's Drag U. She also appeared in a television commercial for Absolut Vodka that aired during the third season of Drag Race dressed as a Bloody Mary. In 2011, she hosted an episode of Logo's One Night Stand Up, a comedy special filmed live in the Bowery Ballroom in New York City. Other performers included Bianca Del Rio, Hedda Lettuce, and Kelly Mantle. Later that year, Boxx appeared in an Entertainment Weekly photo spread along with Mimi Imfurst that featured Melissa McCarthy channeling Divine. In September 2011, Boxx released her first single "Cooter!"

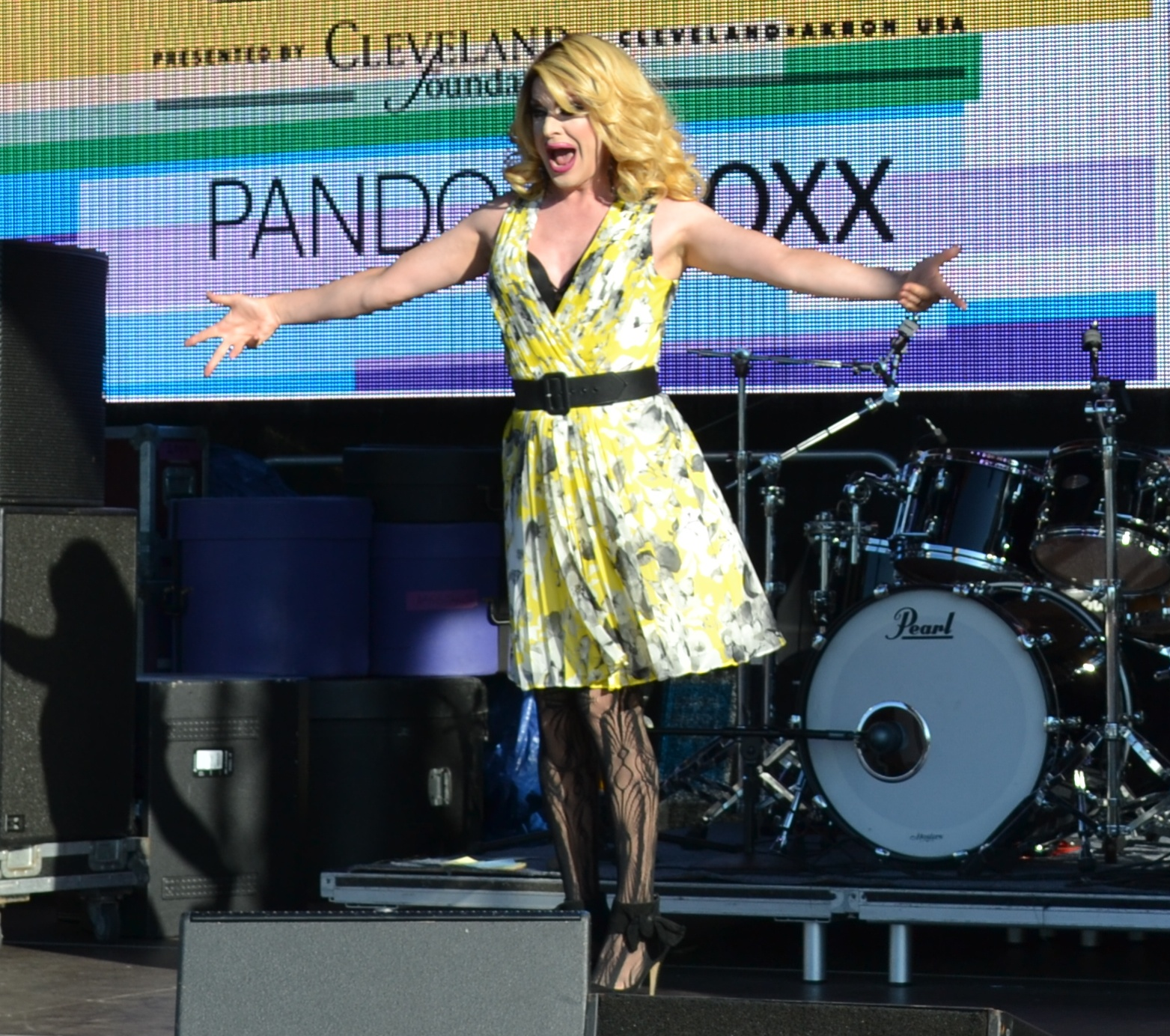
Boxx performing in 2014 at the Gay Games Festival Village in Cleveland

Boxx and Sherry Vine released "Give Me All Your Muff", a parody of "Give Me All Your Luvin'" by Madonna in 2012. In addition, Boxx released several singles in 2012: a cover version of Samantha Fox's song "I Wanna Have Some Fun" and the original song "Nice Car! (Shame About Your Penis)". In 2012, Sharon Needles won the online voting to appear on RuPaul's Drag Race: All Stars, but revealed that she was not going to participate due to the fact she was the reigning winner of the fourth season. Needles also confirmed that Boxx was her replacement and would appear on the show. Boxx, along with team partner Mimi Imfurst, formed Team Mandora. They were the first two contestants eliminated on All Stars, placing 11th and 12th.

After appearing on All Stars 1, Boxx was featured as a playable character along with Manila Luzon and Yara Sofia for RuPaul's Drag Race: Dragopolis, a mobile video game. In 2013, Boxx began hosting Drag Center, a series of RuPaul's Drag Race recaps for NewNowNext. She also released a single with Adam Barta called "You Seemed Shady to Me", which appeared in the top 50 of the iTunes comedy single charts. She was one of thirty drag queens featured in Miley Cyrus's performance of her song "Dooo It!" at the 2015 MTV Video Music Awards.

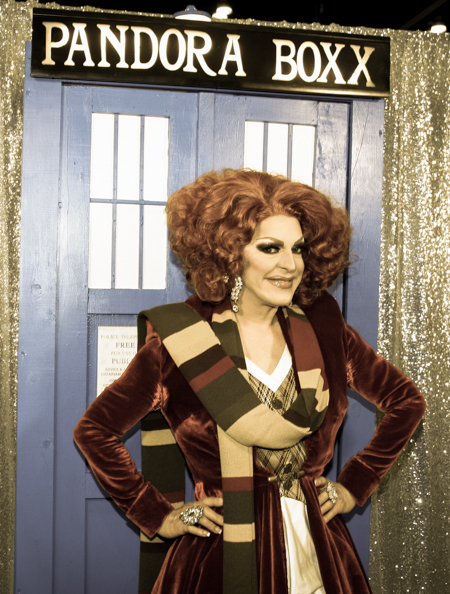
Boxx at RuPaul's DragCon LA in 2018

In September 2018, Boxx released "Oops I Think I Pooped", a parody of Katy Perry's song "This Is How We Do". The music video featured fellow RuPaul's Drag Race's contestants Alaska Thunderfuck, Jasmine Masters and Mariah Paris Balenciaga, as well as Jai Rodriguez from Queer Eye. In May 2019, Boxx appeared on stage during Christine and the Queens' performance during the season 11 finale of RuPaul's Drag Race.

In May 2021, it was revealed that Pandora would be competing in the sixth season of RuPaul's Drag Race All Stars alongside 12 other contestants, including fellow season 2 contestant Kylie Sonique Love and fellow All Stars season 1 contestant Yara Sofia. She performed at the inaugural Jamestown LGBTQ Pride Festival in June 2021.

== Personal life ==
Steck is gender-fluid. Steck became engaged to Ian Dinse on Christmas Day, 2010, making an announcement via Twitter. They married on April 24, 2022.

== Discography ==
=== Albums ===
List of studio albums, with release date and label shown
Title	Details
Boxx	Released: July 16, 2024; Label: Pandorable; Formats: Streaming, digital download

=== Singles ===
Title	Year	Album
"Cooter!"	2011	Non-album singles
"I Wanna Have Some Fun" (featuring Tim Permanent)	2012	Non-album singles
"Nice Car! (Shame About Your Penis)" (featuring Shango)	2012	Non-album singles
"You Seemed Shady to Me" (featuring Adam Barta)	2012	Non-album singles
"Different"	2014	Non-album singles
"Unicorn"	2015	Non-album singles
"Oops I Think I Pooped"	2018	Non-album singles
"Ridiculous" (featuring Electropoint)	2021	Non-album singles
"Cooter: The Ballad"	2024	Non-album singles

==== As featured artist ====
Title	Year	Album	Ref(s)
"Show Up Queen" (as part of the cast of RuPaul's Drag Race All Stars, Season 6)	2021	Non-album single	

== Filmography ==
=== Film ===
Year	Title	Role	Notes
2008	A Voice from the Lantern	Marvelous Marvin	Short film
2008	Mrs. Kasha Davis: The Life of an International Housewife Celebrity	Delores Matterhatter	Short film; director and writer
2013	X Confident	Iris	Short film
2020	Workhouse Queen	Herself	Documentary
2021	The Bitch Who Stole Christmas	Townsfolk #3	
TBD	MEAT	Mabel Bergmann	

=== Television ===
Year	Title	Role	Notes
1997	Ricki Lake	Herself	Episode: "Get A Grip, Doll...You're Too Fat To Be A Drag Queen"
2003	Boys Will Be Girls	Herself	VH1 Documentary
2010	RuPaul's Drag Race	Herself	Contestant (5th Place)
2010, 2012	RuPaul's Drag Race: Untucked	Herself	
2010–12	RuPaul's Drag U	Herself	
2010	Jeffery & Cole Casserole		Season 2, Episode 5: "The Teen Moms"
2010	The Real Housewives of Atlanta	Guest	Season 3, Episode 3: "White Hot"
2011	One Night Stand Up	Herself	Episode 10: Dragtastic NYC
2012	Are You There, Chelsea?	Tiffany	Episode 8: "Dee Dee's Pillow"
2012	RuPaul's Drag Race: All Stars	Herself	Contestant (11th/12th Place)
2013	She's Living for This	Herself	Season 2, Episode 1
2014	People You Know	Adora Jarr	Episode: "Moving On"
2017	Talk Show The Game Show	Herself	Contestant
2018	Some Kind of Wonderful	Mrs. Betty / Danny	Pilot
2018	RuPaul's Drag Race	Herself (Guest)	Season 10, Episode 1
2020	AJ and the Queen	Herself	Guest appearance
2021	RuPaul's Drag Race All Stars (season 6)	Herself	Contestant (6th Place)
2021	RuPaul's Drag Race All Stars: Untucked	Herself	Contestant (6th Place)
2023	#TheDish	Herself	Tubi exclusive

=== Theater ===
Year	Title	Role	Theatre	Ref(s)
2016	America's Drag Stars	Herself	Borgata Music Box	
2017	Psycho: The Musical Parody	Lila Crane	San Francisco's Oasis Nightclub	

=== Music video appearances ===
Year	Song	Director
2012	"Queen" (Xelle)	JC Cassis
2013	"Ru Girl" (Alaska Thunderfuck)	Carly Usdin
2014	"Ransom" (MOXXI)	Kavan the Kid & Nova Rockafeller
2015	"Not A Pearl" (Willam)	Kain O'Keeffe
2015	"The Hillary Song"(Adrian Anchondo)	Adrian Anchondo
2016	"I Fucked Your Dad" (Kevin Yee ft. Pandora Boxx)	Unknown
2017	"Expensive" (Deluxe Edition) (Todrick Hall)	Todrick Hall & Matthew Macar
2018	"Call My Life" (Blair St. Clair)	Shawn Adeli & Brad Hammer
2022	"Werq!" (Eureka O'Hara)	Brad Hammer

=== Web series ===
Year	Title	Role	Notes	Ref
2014	Ring My Bell	Herself	Guest	
2015	Drag Center	Herself	Host	
2016	Look At Huh!	Herself	Guest	
2017	Spilling The Tea	Herself	Panelist	
2019	Tails of the City: Pets 4 Pets	Herself	Guest	
2019	The Pit Stop	Herself	Guest	
2020	The Golden Pandemic	Rose	Starring role	
2020	Queen With a Cause	Joanna	Episode: "Plastic"	
2021	Whatcha Packin'	Herself	Guest	
2021	Ruvealing the Look	Herself	Guest	
2021	Binge Queens	Herself	Guest	
2023	The David Pakman Show	Herself	Guest	
2023	A Queen Who	Herself	Guest	
2023	Bring Back My Girls	Herself	Guest	
2024	Very Delta	Herself	Guest	
