= Kylie Sonique Love =

American drag queen (born 1983)

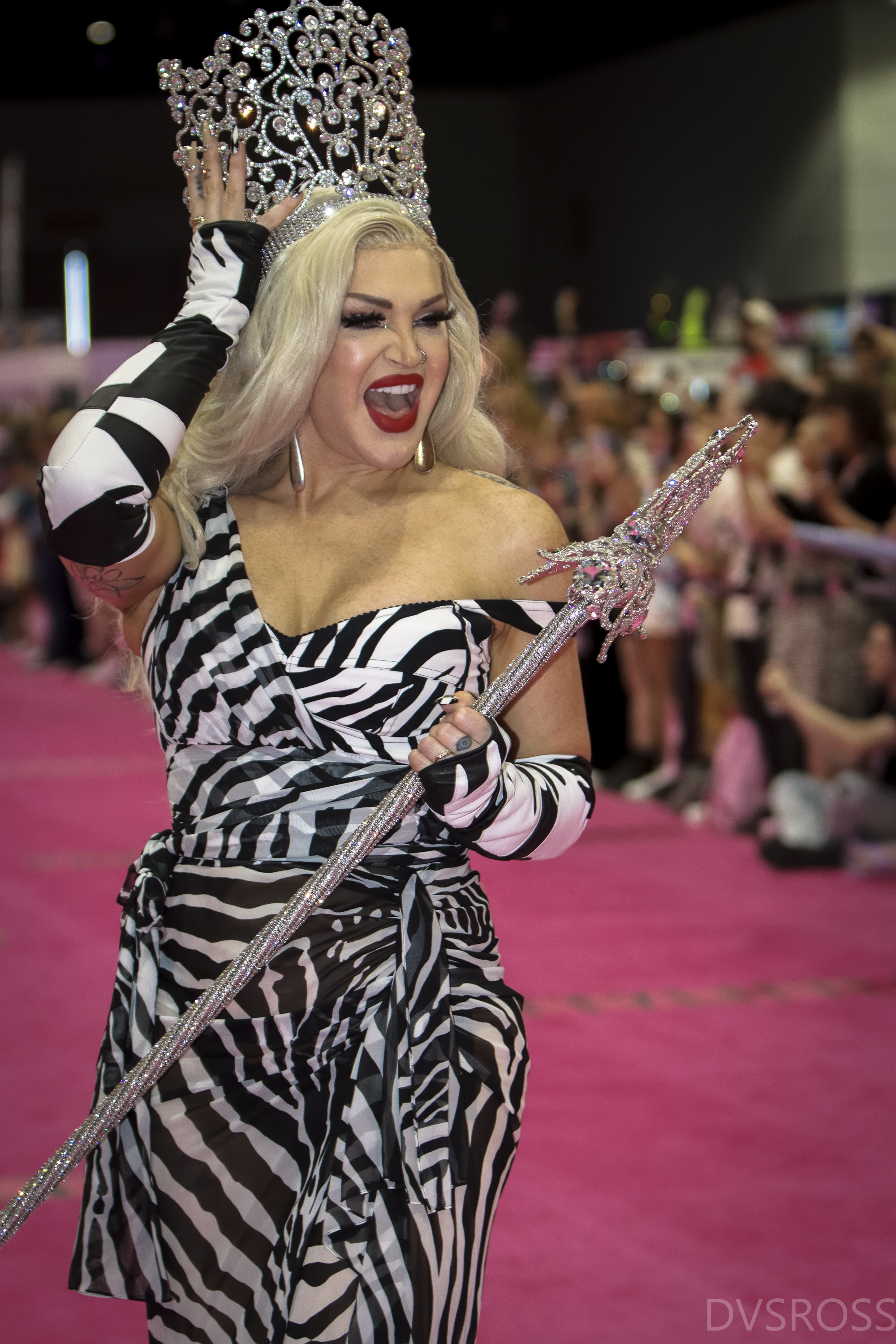
- Kylie Sonique Love at RuPaul's DragCon LA, 2022
- Born: May 2, 1983 (age 43); Albany, Georgia, U.S.
- Other name: Sonique
- Education: Albany Technical College
- Occupations: Entertainer, dancer
- Television: RuPaul's Drag Race (season 2); RuPaul's Drag Race All Stars (season 6); RuPaul's Drag Race Holi-slay Spectacular
- Website: kyliesoniquelove.com

Kylie Sonique Love (born May 2, 1983), formerly known as Sonique, is an American entertainer, singer, dancer, model and reality television personality. She rose to prominence as a contestant on the second season of RuPaul's Drag Race in 2009, and achieved further popularity by winning the sixth season of RuPaul's Drag Race All Stars eleven years later in 2021. Love was the first person to come out as transgender on an American reality TV show. Upon winning All Stars 6, Love became the second trans woman to win an installment of the Drag Race franchise, and was the first to win an American series. Additionally, in 2020, she co-hosted Translation Season 1, the first talk show on a major network hosted by an all-trans cast. Her first single, "Santa, Please Come Home", was released in 2018.

== Early life ==
Kylie Sonique Love was born on May 2, 1983, in Albany, Georgia. She came out as transgender to her mother at 15 and later was sent to military school Fort Stewart to become "more masculine". She received a GED at the Albany Technical College. Her "drag mother" is retired Atlanta performer The Goddess Raven, a national pageant titleholder. She is pansexual.

== Career ==
=== Drag ===
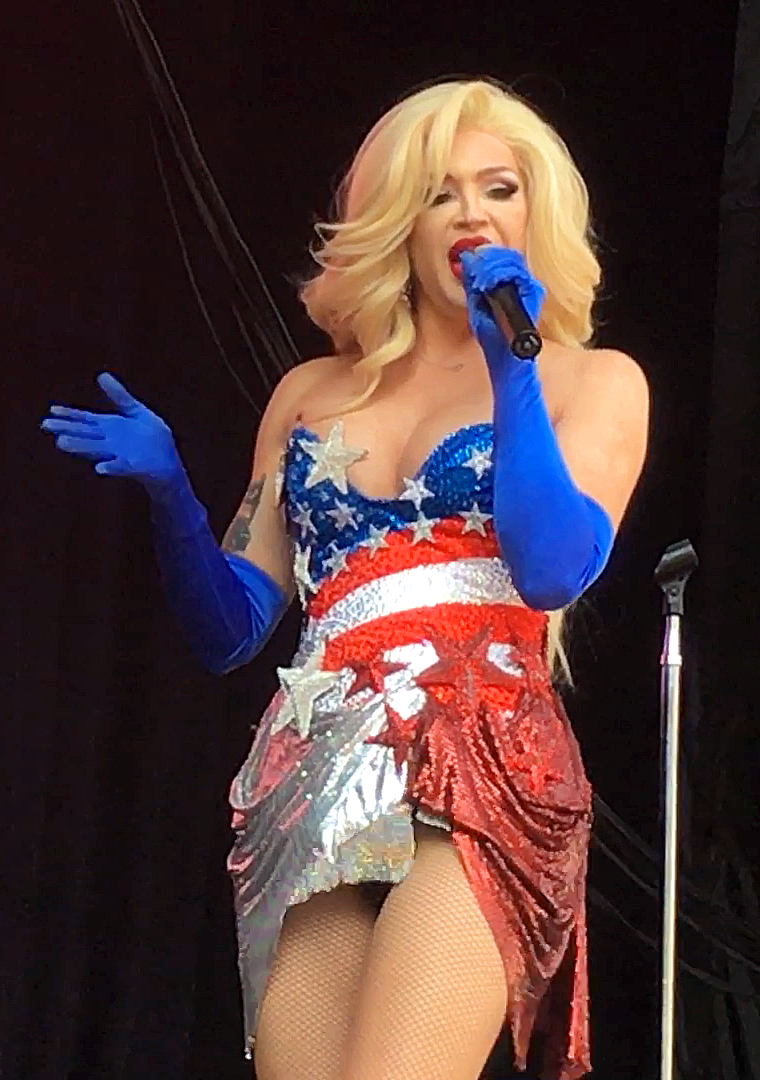
Kylie Sonique Love performing in 2021

Love was announced to be one of twelve contestants for the second season of RuPaul's Drag Race on February 1, 2010. She was placed in the bottom two in episode four and was eliminated after losing a lip sync to "Two of Hearts" by Stacey Q against Morgan McMichaels. She later revealed that she is a transgender woman during the reunion episode of that season. In 2015, Love was one of the 30 performers that appeared as a backup dancer for Miley Cyrus' Video Music Awards performance.

In June 2018, Love was a backup dancer with McMichaels and Farrah Moan for Christina Aguilera at Los Angeles Pride. She subsequently appeared in the RuPaul's Drag Race Holi-slay Spectacular with seven other Drag Race alumni on December 7, 2018. She also appeared as a guest for the first challenge in the premiere episode of season eleven of Drag Race. Love appeared in a music video for Lizzo's song "Juice", which was released on April 17, 2019.

In 2020, Love co-hosted Translation on Out TV, the first talk show on a major network to be hosted by an all-trans cast. Love was announced as one of thirteen contestants competing on the sixth season of RuPaul's Drag Race All Stars on May 26, 2021, where she competed under the name Kylie Sonique Love, after previously competing under the mononym Sonique. On September 2, she was announced as the winner, becoming the first transgender winner in a U.S. version of the show.

=== Music ===
In 2004 at age 19, Love auditioned for American Idol for its third season. She was with Jennifer Hudson in the Atlanta auditions. She sang Crazy in Love by Beyonce and Lady Marmalade, where she gave judge Simon Cowell a lap dance. She also became friends with judge Paula Abdul. Kylie contributed to Tammie Brown's 2018 EP A Little Bit of Tammie. She released her first single, "Santa, Please Come Home", the same day as the premiere of the Holi-slay Spectacular. She released her second single, "Hey Hater", on April 24, 2019.

=== Other ventures ===
In June 2022, she was a featured model for Playful Promises' lingerie Pride Campaign.

== Filmography ==
=== Film ===
Year	Title	Role
2021	The Bitch Who Stole Christmas	Dolly Parton
TBA	Dope Queens	Monika

=== Television ===
Year	Title	Role	Notes	Ref
2010; 2019	RuPaul's Drag Race	Contestant	Season 2, 5 episodes (9th place)	
2010; 2019	RuPaul's Drag Race	Herself	Guest; Season 11, episode 1: "Whatcha Unpackin?"	
2010	RuPaul's Drag Race: Untucked	Herself	Season 1, 4 episodes	
2010	The Real Housewives of Atlanta	Herself	Guest; Season 3, episode 3	
2018	RuPaul's Drag Race Holi-slay Spectacular	Contestant	1 episode (Joint Winner)	
2019	Busy Tonight	Herself	Guest; Season 1, episode 80	
2020–present	Translation	Co-host		
2021	RuPaul's Drag Race All Stars	Contestant	Season 6, 12 episodes (Winner)	
2021	RuPaul's Drag Race All Stars: Untucked	Herself	Season 3, 12 episodes	
2021	Dragging the Classics: The Brady Bunch	Jan Brady		
2024	RuPaul's Drag Race All Stars	Herself	Special guest; Season 9, episode 12: "Grand Finale Variety Extravaganza: Part 2"	

=== Music videos ===
Year	Title	Artist	Ref.
2015	"Not a Pearl"	Willam	
2015	"Es Una Pasiva (Boy Is a Bottom Español)"	Willam	
2019	"Juice"	Lizzo	
2021	"Do It Like Dolly"	Kylie Sonique Love	
2021	"Gooey"	Cazwell featuring Kylie Sonique Love	

=== Web series ===
Year	Title	Role	Notes	Ref.
2013	Ring My Bell	Herself	Guest	
2018	Hey Qween!	Herself	Guest	
2018	Cosmo Queens	Herself	Guest	
2019	Drag Queens React	Herself	Guest, Episode: "Giving Birth"	
2019	Bootleg Opinions	Herself	Guest, Episode: "Drag Race UK Season 1 Episode 2"	
2019	Follow Me	Herself	Episode: "Mayhem Miller"	
2019	Be$tie$ for Ca$h	Herself	Guest, WOW+ Exclusive	
2020	Working Out Is a Drag	Herself	Guest	
2021	Drag Us Weekly	Herself	Guest	
2021	Whatcha Packin'	Herself	Guest	
2021	Ruvealing the Look	Herself	Guest	
2021	Binge Queens	Herself	Guest	
2021	Binge	Herself	Podcast; guest	
2023	The Pit Stop	Herself	Guest, Episode: The Pit Stop AS8 E02 🏁 | Bianca Del Rio & Kylie Sonique Love Squad Up!	
2023	Bring Back My Girls	Herself	Episode: "All Stars 6"	
2025	The Pit Stop	Herself	Guest, Episode: The Pit Stop AS10 E08 🏁 Monét X Change & Kylie Sonique Love Can't Stop!	

== Discography ==
=== EPs ===
Title	Details
Hey Hater (Erik Vilar Official Remix)	Released: May 14, 2021; Label: KSL Bops; Formats: Digital download, streaming

=== Singles ===
==== As lead artist ====
Year	Title	Album	Writer(s)	Producer(s)	Ref(s)
2018	"Santa, Please Come Home"	Non-album single	Wendy Ho	No producer credited	
2019	"Hey Hater"	Non-album single	Kylie Sonique Love	Aaron Zepeda, Love	
2019	"Hey Hater, Pt. 2"	Non-album single	Love	No producer credited	
2020	"Just Thinking"	Non-album single	Love	No producer credited	
2020	"11:11"	Non-album single	Love	No producer credited	
2020	"Toxic"	Non-album single	Bloodshy, Cathy Dennis, Pontus Winnberg, Henrik Jonback	No producer credited	
2021	"Straight to the Top"	Non-album single	Love	No producer credited	
2021	"I'm So Lonesome I Could Cry"	Non-album single	Hank Williams	No producer credited	
2021	"Two Timing Daddy"	Non-album single	Love	No producer credited	
2021	"My Buddy and Me"	Non-album single	Love	No producer credited	
2021	"Gooey" (with Cazwell)	Non-album single	Cazwell	Cazwell, Barbeau, Richie Beretta, Craig C	
2021	"Do It Like Dolly"	Non-album single	Love, John Duff	Samjgarfield, KOIL PreAmple, Duff	
2021	"Complete Me"	Non-album single	Love, John Duff	Samjgarfield, Duff	
2023	"God's Child (Baila Conmigo)" (with Timo Nuñez)	Non-album single	Love, Timo Nuñez	No producer credited	
2023	"Ex Miss"	Non-album single	Drew Louis, Jayelle, Love	Drew Louis	
2024	"Lost Angel"	Non-album single	Louis, Love	Drew Louis	

==== As featured artist ====
Year	Title	Album	Ref(s)
2018	"The Whale Song" (Tammie Brown featuring Michael Catti, Jeff Musial, Alyson Montez, Ricky Rebel, Kelly Mantle, and Bad Dance Crew)	Non-album single	
2019	"Bad Bitch" (Justin Symbol featuring Trash Can Cut)	Non-album single	
2021	"Show Up Queen" (The Cast of RuPaul's Drag Race All Stars, Season 6)	Non-album single	
2021	"This Is Our Country" (RuPaul and Tanya Tucker featuring The Cast of RuPaul's Drag Race All Stars, Season 6)	Non-album single	
2022	"Escobar (Remix)" (Timo Nuñez, Itslitobbs)	Non-album single	
2023	"Light in the Dark" (Trinity the Tuck featuring Aria B. Cassadine & Kylie Sonique Love)	Trinity Ruins Christmas: The Musical	
2023	"Good Enough" (Trinity the Tuck featuring Alaska Thunderfuck, Jimbo, Manila Luzon, Ginger Minj, Aria B. Cassadine, Kylie Sonique Love)	Trinity Ruins Christmas: The Musical	

== Awards and nominations ==
Year	Award-giving body	Category	Work	Results	Ref.
2022	Queerty Awards	Drag Royalty	Herself	Nominated	
2022	WOWIE Awards	Breakout Stars of 2022	Herself	Won	
2022	MTV Movie & TV Awards	Best Reality Return	RuPaul's Drag Race All Stars	Nominated	

Preceded by Shea Couleé	Winner of RuPaul's Drag Race All Stars; US All Stars 6	Succeeded by Jinkx Monsoon
