= Yara Sofia =

Puerto Rican drag queen

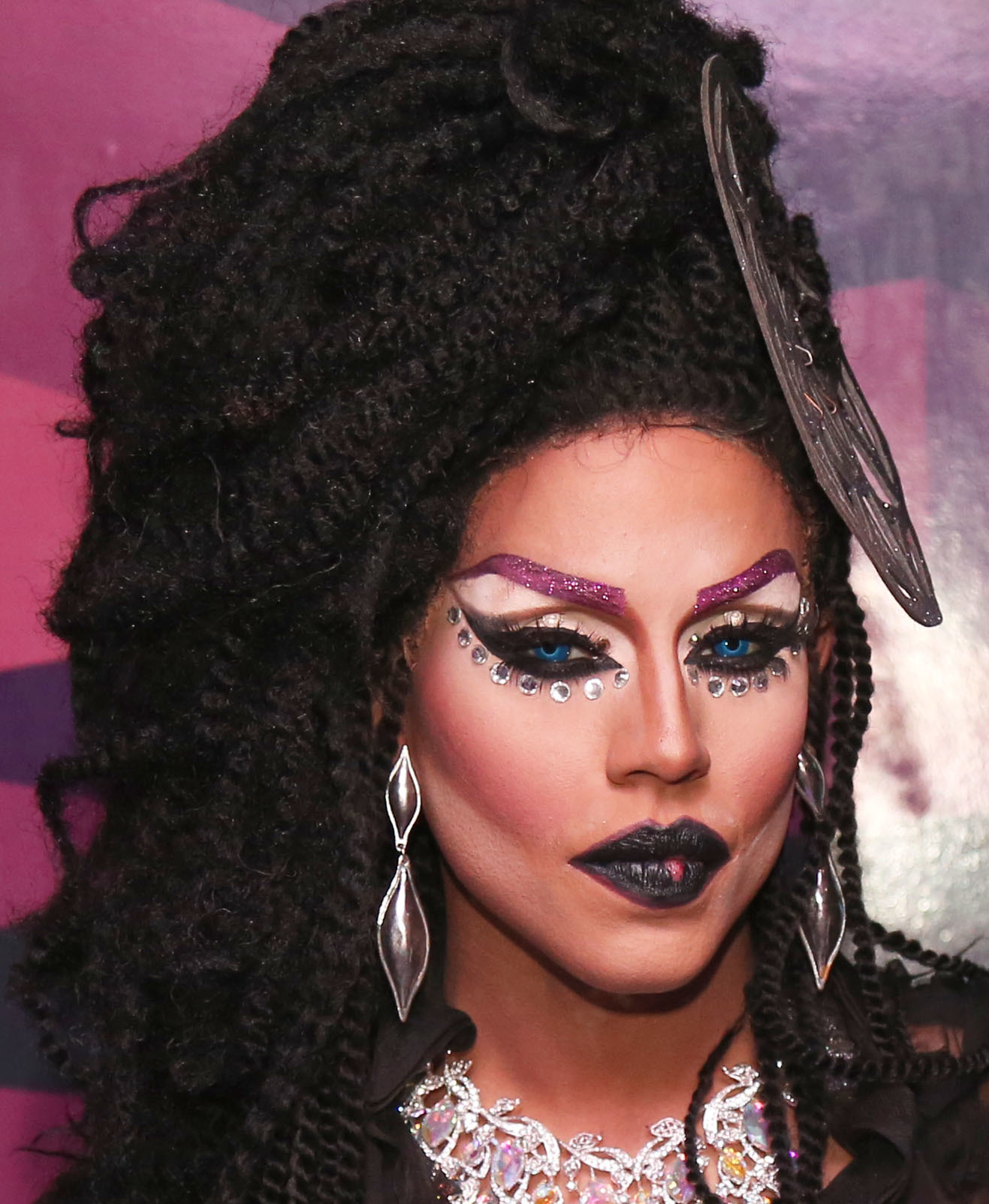
- Sofia in February 2016
- Born: Gabriel Burgos Ortiz; May 8, 1984 (age 41); San Juan, Puerto Rico
- Education: University of the Sacred Heart (BFA)
- Occupation(s): Drag queen, make-up artist, reality television personality, seamstress.
- Known for: RuPaul's Drag Race (season 3); RuPaul's Drag Race All Stars (season 1 and season 6)
- Title: Miss Congeniality
- Predecessor: Pandora Boxx
- Successor: Latrice Royale

Yara Sofia is the stage name of Gabriel Burgos Ortiz (born May 8, 1984), a Puerto Rican drag queen, professional make-up artist, and reality television personality.

She is most known for appearing on RuPaul's Drag Race season 3, where she won Miss Congeniality, and All Stars season 1, where she was partnered with Alexis Mateo. In 2021, Sofia returned to compete on All Stars season 6. In June 2021, she released "Jiggle!", her debut single.

== Biography ==
Although born in San Juan, Ortiz was raised in the small town of Manatí, Puerto Rico. While her mother was pregnant with her, she had expected Yara to be a girl for the majority of her pregnancy, and had even denied the doctor informing her of her baby's sex until she was revealed to be male. Her drag career began at local San Juan gay nightclub Krash (also known as Eros), where in 2005, she won her first gay pageant title "Miss Road to Diva." Later, in 2006, Ortiz earned a Bachelor of Fine Arts degree in theater from the Universidad del Sagrado Corazón in San Juan. Her name originates from a beauty pageant that was held at her former dance studio, where she chose the name Cuba. She also selected the name Yara after a girl she attended school with, and was gifted the surname Sofia by a friend of hers who also competed in the pageant.

== Career ==
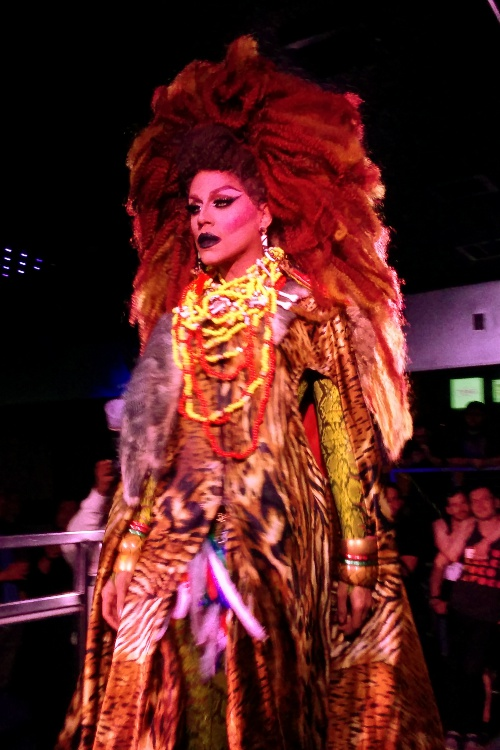
Yara in June 2015

=== RuPaul's Drag Race ===
Sofia was announced as a cast member on the third season of Logo's popular reality series, RuPaul's Drag Race, which premiered on the network on January 29, 2011. With a heavy, yet comically perceived accent and a popular catchphrase (Echa Pa'lante which translates to Go Forward) she became a fan favorite due to her unique use of makeup, wigs, contact lenses and fashion. She won the challenge in episode 11 where the contestants had to create three different looks for a hair themed fashion show. She was eliminated in what was considered a very emotional lip sync against fellow contestant Alexis Mateo in the thirteenth episode of the season, which first aired on April 22, 2011. During the reunion special, which aired on May 2, 2011, Sofia won the annual Miss Congeniality award.

On 6 August 2012, it was announced that Sofia was one of twelve past Drag Race contestants selected to join the cast of RuPaul's Drag Race: All Stars that premiered on the Logo network on 22 October 2012. Due to the team twist of the season, she teamed with Alexis Mateo to form Team Yarlexis. The duo was eliminated in the fourth episode of the series which aired on 12 November 2012, coming in the 3rd-place position amongst the teams, with Sofia therefore placing 5th/6th overall with Mateo.

Sofia appeared among other Drag Race alumni as a guest in episode one of season ten in January 2018.

On the 26th of May she was announced to be part of the cast for RuPaul's Drag Race All Stars 6, alongside 12 other queens, including fellow All Stars 1 contestant Pandora Boxx. She won the Variety Show on the first episode and lost the Lip-Sync For Your Legacy against Lip-Sync Assassin Coco Montrese. She was later eliminated on the fourth episode, Halftime Headliners, placing 10th overall.

=== Other ventures ===
In 2012, along with other RuPaul's Drag Race contestants, Sofia appeared in the music video "Queen" for New York City-based girl group Xelle, fronted by alum Mimi Imfurst. Sofia also appeared in the music video "Werqin' Gurl" by season two, three and All Stars season three alum Shangela.

Outside of Drag Race, Sofia was a playable character with Pandora Boxx and Manila Luzon for the "RuPaul's Drag Race: Dragopolis" app.

Sofia appeared with other alum for an episode of the Game Show Network show Skin Wars in May 2016.

On November 6, 2017, Sofia was a featured performer in Queens United, a benefit show created by Phi Phi O'Hara in an effort to raise money to people affected by Hurricane Maria.

Sofia co-hosted the Tucking 101: Now You See It, Now You Don’t at RuPaul's DragCon LA in 2018.

She cites Lady Gaga, Alexander McQueen, and Michael Kors as her inspirations.

== Filmography ==
=== Television ===
Year	Title	Role	Notes
2011	RuPaul's Drag Race (season 3)	Herself	Contestant; 4th Place
2011	RuPaul's Drag Race: Untucked	Herself	Contestant; 4th Place
2012	RuPaul's Drag Race All Stars (season 1)	Herself	Contestant; 5th/6th Place
2012	RuPaul's Drag Race All Stars: Untucked (season 1)	Herself	Contestant; 5th/6th Place
2016	Skin Wars	Herself	Episode: "Miss Skin Wars"
2018	RuPaul's Drag Race (season 10)	Herself	Guest - Episode 1
2021	RuPaul's Drag Race All Stars (season 6)	Herself	Contestant; 10th Place
2021	RuPaul's Drag Race All Stars: Untucked	Herself	Contestant; 10th Place
2022	Drag Race España (season 2)	Herself	Guest appearance, episode 10

=== Web series ===
Year	Title	Role	Notes	Ref.
2013	Ring My Bell	Herself	Guest	
2013	Transformations	Herself	Guest	
2013	WOW Shopping Network	Herself	Guest	
2014	Couple$ for Ca$h	Herself	Guest	
2020	Envy of My Boogie	Herself	Guest	
2021	Whatcha Packin'	Herself	Guest	
2021	Ruvealing the Look	Herself	Guest	

=== Music videos ===
Year	Title	Artist	Ref.
2012	"Queen"	Xelle	
2012	"Werqin' Girl"	Shangela	
2012	"Responsitranity"	RuPaul	

== Discography ==
Singles

Year	Song	Album	Ref
2021	"Jiggle!"	Non-album singles	
