= Grand Finale (RuPaul's Drag Race season 11) =

Episode of RuPaul's Drag Race

- RuPaul's Drag Race episode
- Episode no.: Season 11; Episode 14
- Original air date: May 30, 2019

Episode chronology
← Previous "Reunited"	Next → "I'm That Bitch"
- RuPaul's Drag Race season 11

"Grand Finale" is the fourteenth episode of the eleventh season of the American television series RuPaul's Drag Race. It originally aired on May 30, 2019. The episode sees the top four contestants compete in a lip-sync tournament to determine the season's winner. The season's contestants also return to present looks and join the live audience. Tiffany Pollard, Christine and the Queens, and Love Connie make guest appearances. Yvie Oddly is declared the winner after defeating runner-up Brooke Lynn Hytes in the tournament's final lip-sync.

== Episode ==
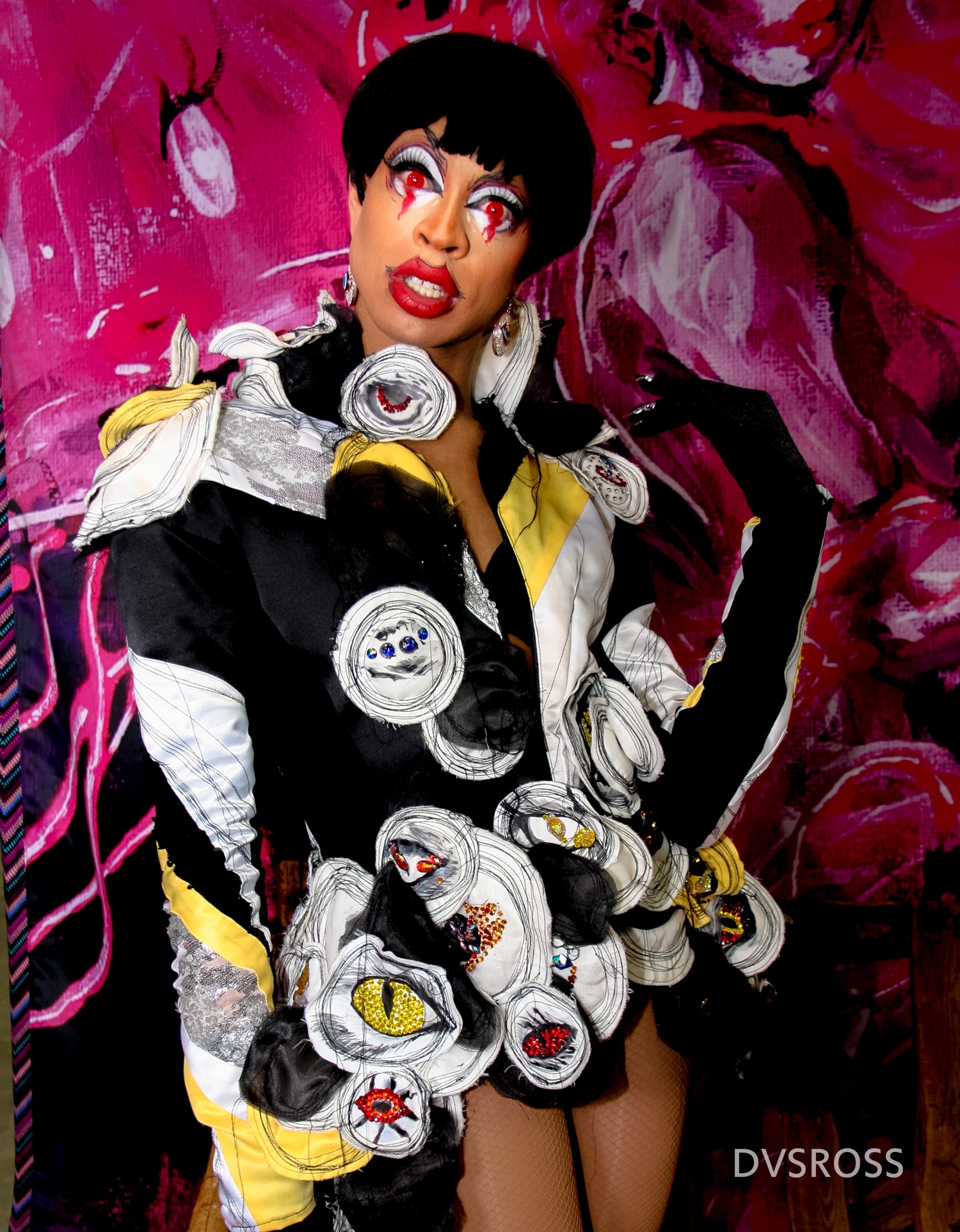
Yvie Oddly (pictured at RuPaul's DragCon LA in 2019) is crowned the season's winner.

All of the contestants return for the grand finale. After the contestants enter the stage one at a time, RuPaul welcomes the live audience and shares that the four finalists (A'keria C. Davenport, Brooke Lynn Hytes, Silky Nutmeg Ganache, and Yvie Oddly) will face off in a lip-sync tournament to determine the season's winner. Judges Michelle Visage, Ross Mathews, and Carson Kressley watch from one of the theater's side balconies. For each finalist, RuPaul introduces a video montage, then follows with an interview on the stage and with family members and friends in the audience. Another video montage narrated by RuPaul discusses the Stonewall riots, shows clips from the show and of the LGBTQ community, and reminds viewers to vote.

In one outro to a commercial break, Kahanna Montrese and Mercedes Iman Diamond perform to a remix of "Opulence", referencing their work on the season's second episode "Good God Girl, Get Out". In another segment, RuPaul shares a video montage about Visage and her breasts, then Visage discusses her experience with breast implant illness. In a different outro, Christine and the Queens performs a cover of RuPaul's song "Sissy That Walk" while former contestants from the show present looks on the runway. Another bit sees Vanessa Vanjie Mateo meet people on the street as part of her campaign to compete in the finale. RuPaul jokingly declares her the season's winner. Love Connie dances in another outro to a commercial.

Silky Nutmeg Ganache is selected to participate in the first lip-sync contest, based on a spin of a wheel. She chooses to compete against Brooke Lynn Hytes, who selects a box with "Bootylicious" (2001) by Destiny's Child. Brooke Lynn Hytes wins and Silky Nutmeg Ganache is eliminated from the competition. The second lip-sync contest is between A'keria C. Davenport and Yvie Oddly to "SOS" (2006) by Rihanna. Yvie Oddly wins and A'keria C. Davenport is eliminated from the competition. Monét X Change, last season's Miss Congeniality, returns to crown Nina West as this season's title holder. Reigning winner Aquaria returns for an interview with RuPaul. The final lip-sync contest is between Brooke Lynn Hytes and Yvie Oddly to "The Edge of Glory" (2011) by Lady Gaga. Yvie Oddly is deemed the winner, making Brooke Lynn Hytes the runner-up.

== Production and broadcast ==
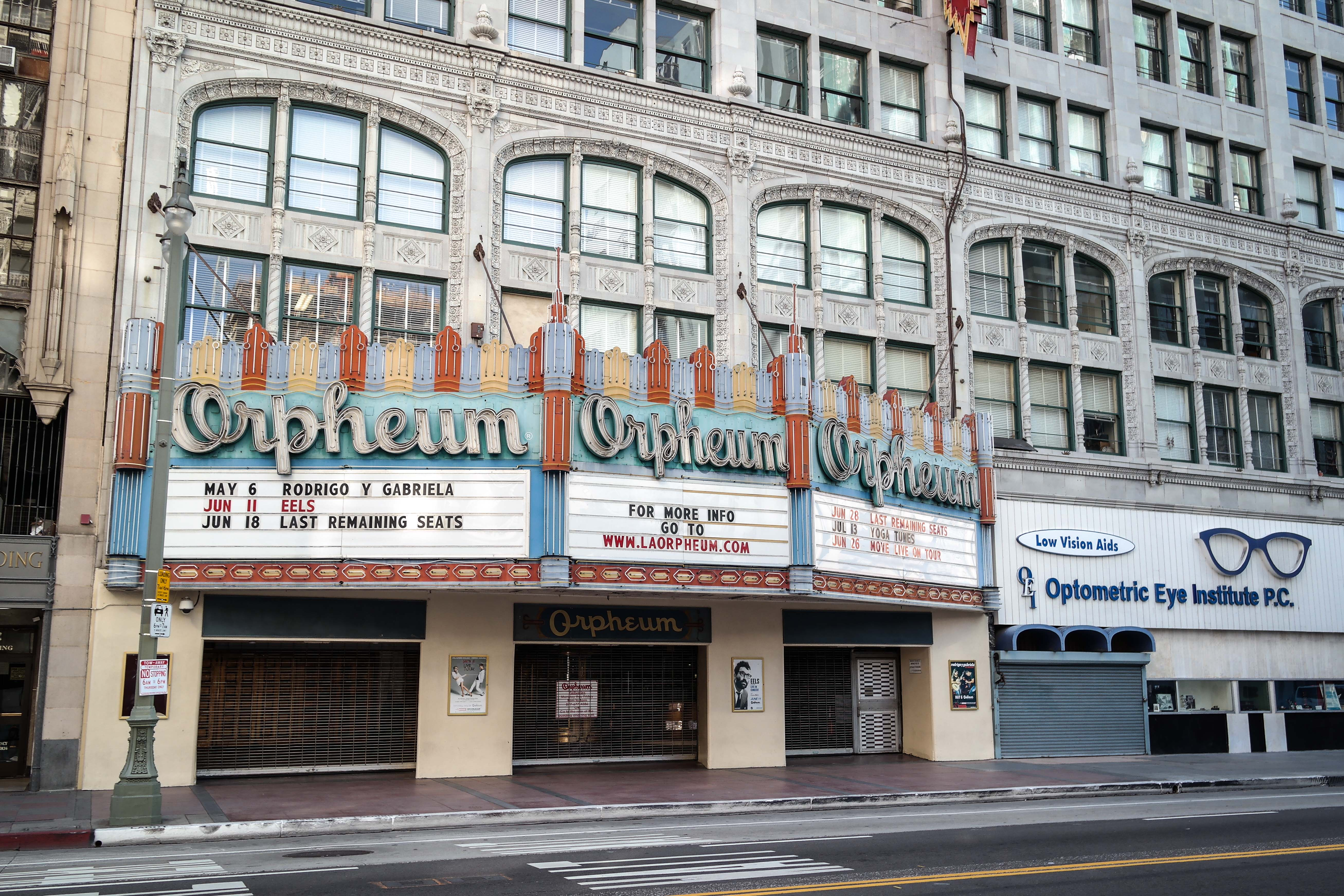
The episode was filmed at the Orpheum Theater (exterior pictured in 2014) in Los Angeles.

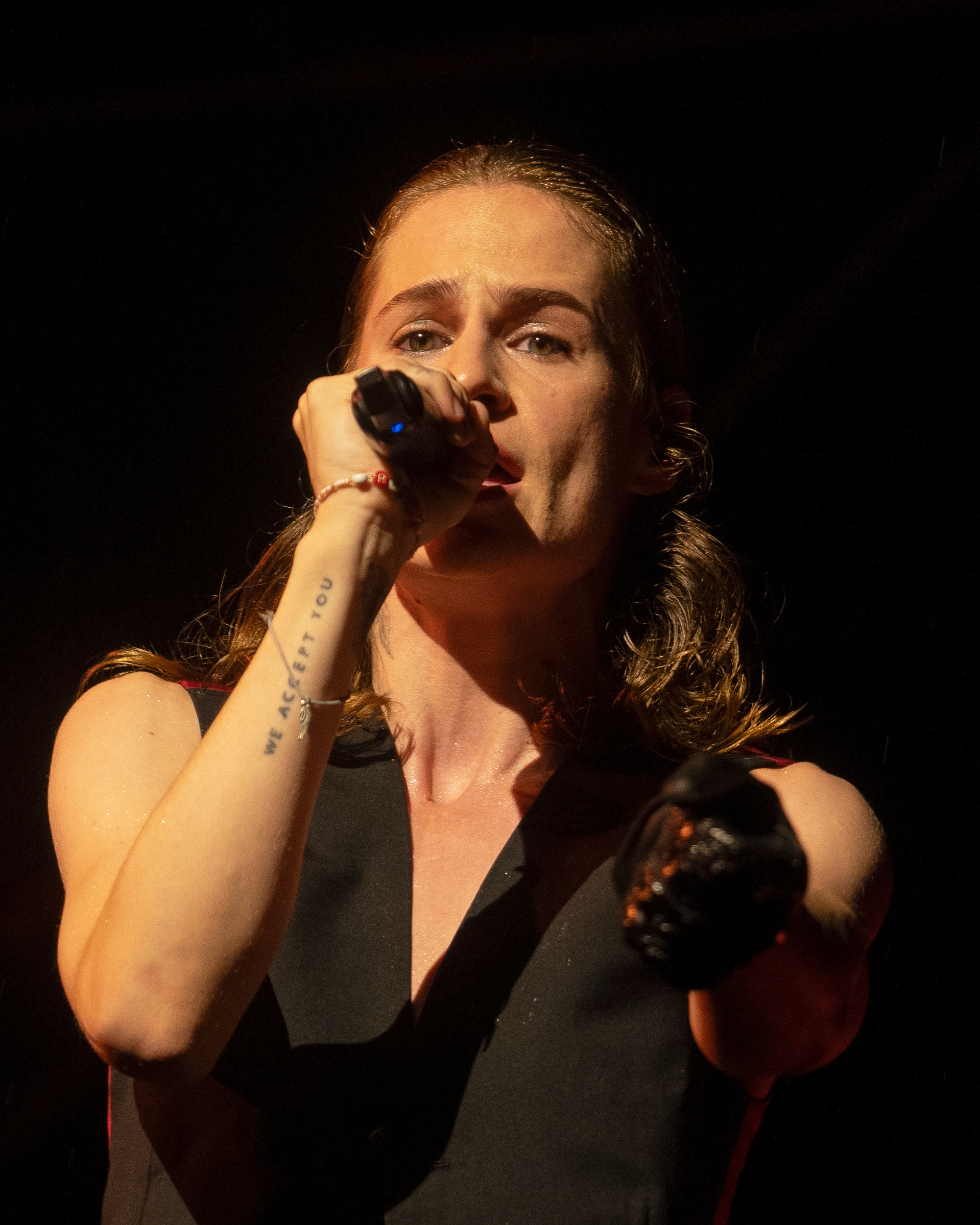
Rahim Redcar (pictured in 2023) performs a cover of RuPaul's "Sissy That Walk" as Christine and the Queens.

The originally was filmed at the Orpheum Theater in Los Angeles, California, in May 20219. Filming took approximately five hours. Multiple endings were filmed. Tiffany Pollard makes a guest appearance in Brooke Lynn Hytes's video montage. The episode originally aired on May 30, 2019.

This season marked the first time the four finalists gathered for the finale. The finalists watched at a private screening hosted by VH1 in partnership with Levi Strauss & Co. at the company’s headquarters in San Francisco.

=== Fashion ===
RuPaul wears a green dress and a blonde wig. For the runway walk at the start of the episode, Soju wears a geisha-inspired red dress. Kahanna Montrese has gold boots and a large decorative backpack. Honey Davenport's outfit is black and gold. Mercedes Iman Diamond has a red dress with matching high-heeled shoe and a blonde wig. Ariel Versace has a pink tulle dress and white high-heels. Scarlet Envy wears a red dress and a red wig. Ra'Jah O'Hara has a black dress and a dark wig with streaks of purple. Plastique Tiara's outfit has white. Shuga Cain pulls off part of her outfit and she wears a headpiece. Nina West has a red paper doll-inspired dress with the back cut out to give the illusion of her exposed buttocks, as well as a pink wig. Vanessa Vanjie Mateo's outfit has an animal print. She wears a blonde wig.

For her interview with RuPaul, Brooke Lynn Hytes wears a white dress with a matching headpiece. Silky Nutmeg Ganache has a black outfit with many hanging beads. Yvie Oddly's red outfit gives the appearance of flesh removal and she also wears a headpiece. For their appearances, Monét X Change wears a yellow dress and Aquaria wears a bird-inspired outfit.

For the lip-sync tournament, Brooke Lynn Hytes wears a black-and-red outfit and a short blonde wig. Silky Nutmeg Ganache starts with a pink dress and a large afro. She removes both, revealing a pink-and-white outfit and another wig. She removes these as well, revealing a blue-and-white outfit with a light blue wig. A'keria C. Davenport wears a blue outfit, part of which she removes, and a red wig. Yvie Oddly has a colorful outfit with yellow boots and a pink wig. Her green shorts have the text "Free Britney". For the final contest, Brooke Lynn Hytes starts with a black cover over her outfit with the text "Reveal", as well as a blonde wig. She removes then cover to reveal a bodysuit. Yvie Oddly has a gold-and-brown outfit with a mirrored headpiece.

== Reception ==
Kate Kulzick of The A.V. Club gave the episode a rating of 'B'. Writing for Vulture, Matt Rogers rated the episode three out of five stars. Joey Nolfi of Entertainment Weekly described the final lip-sync contest as "epic". Out magazine noted the reaction received by Yvvie Oddly's father.
