= Whatcha Unpackin? =

- RuPaul's Drag Race episode
- Episode no.: Season 11; Episode 1
- Original air date: February 28, 2019

Guest appearances
- Miley Cyrus (guest judge); Adore Delano; Delta Work; Derrick Barry; Eureka; Farrah Moan; Ginger Minj; Jasmine Masters; Kimora Blac; Manila Luzon; Mariah Balenciaga; Ongina; Raja; Raven; Sonique; Victoria "Porkchop" Parker

Episode chronology
← Previous "Grand Finale"	Next → "Good God Girl, Get Out"
- RuPaul's Drag Race season 11

"Whatcha Unpackin?" is the first episode of the eleventh season of the American television series RuPaul's Drag Race. It originally aired on February 28, 2019. The episode's main challenge tasks contestants with creating outfits from materials belonging to former competitors. Miley Cyrus is a guest judge.

Brooke Lynn Hytes wins the main challenge. Soju is eliminated from the competition after placing in the bottom two and losing a lip-sync contest against Kahanna Montrese to Cyrus' song "The Best of Both Worlds".

The episode earned director Nick Murray a nomination in the Outstanding Directing for a Reality Program category at the 71st Primetime Emmy Awards and American fashion designer Zaldy a nomination in the Excellence in Variety, Reality-Competition, Live Television category at the 22nd Costume Designers Guild Awards.

== Episode ==
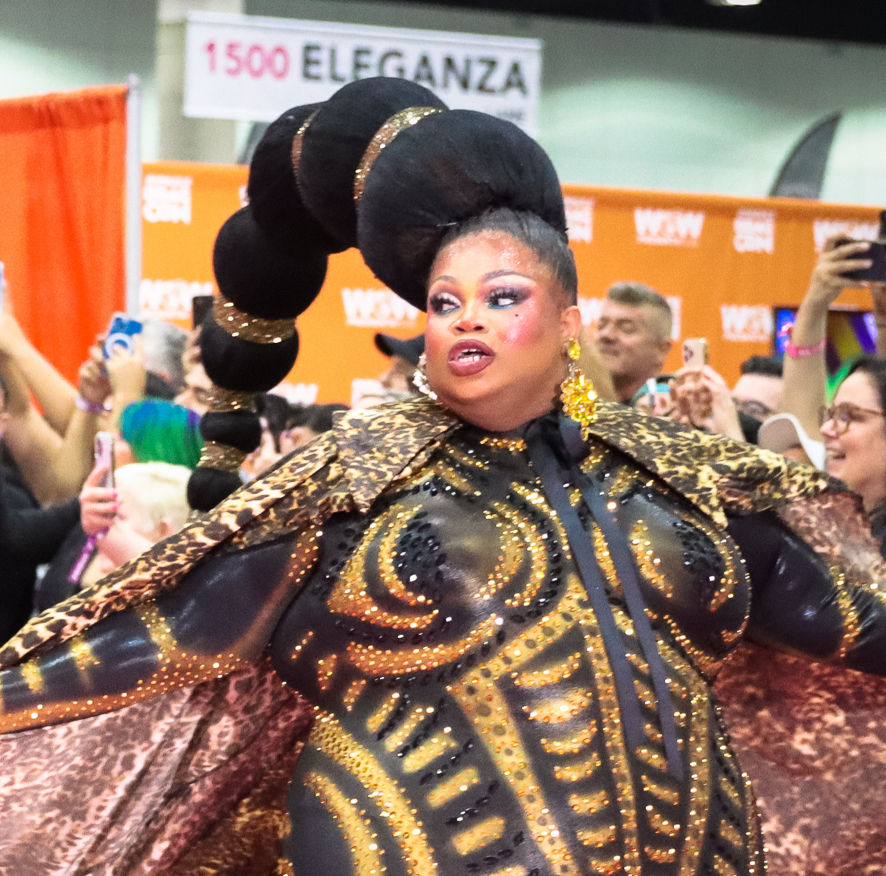
Silky Nutmeg Ganache wins the mini-challenge.

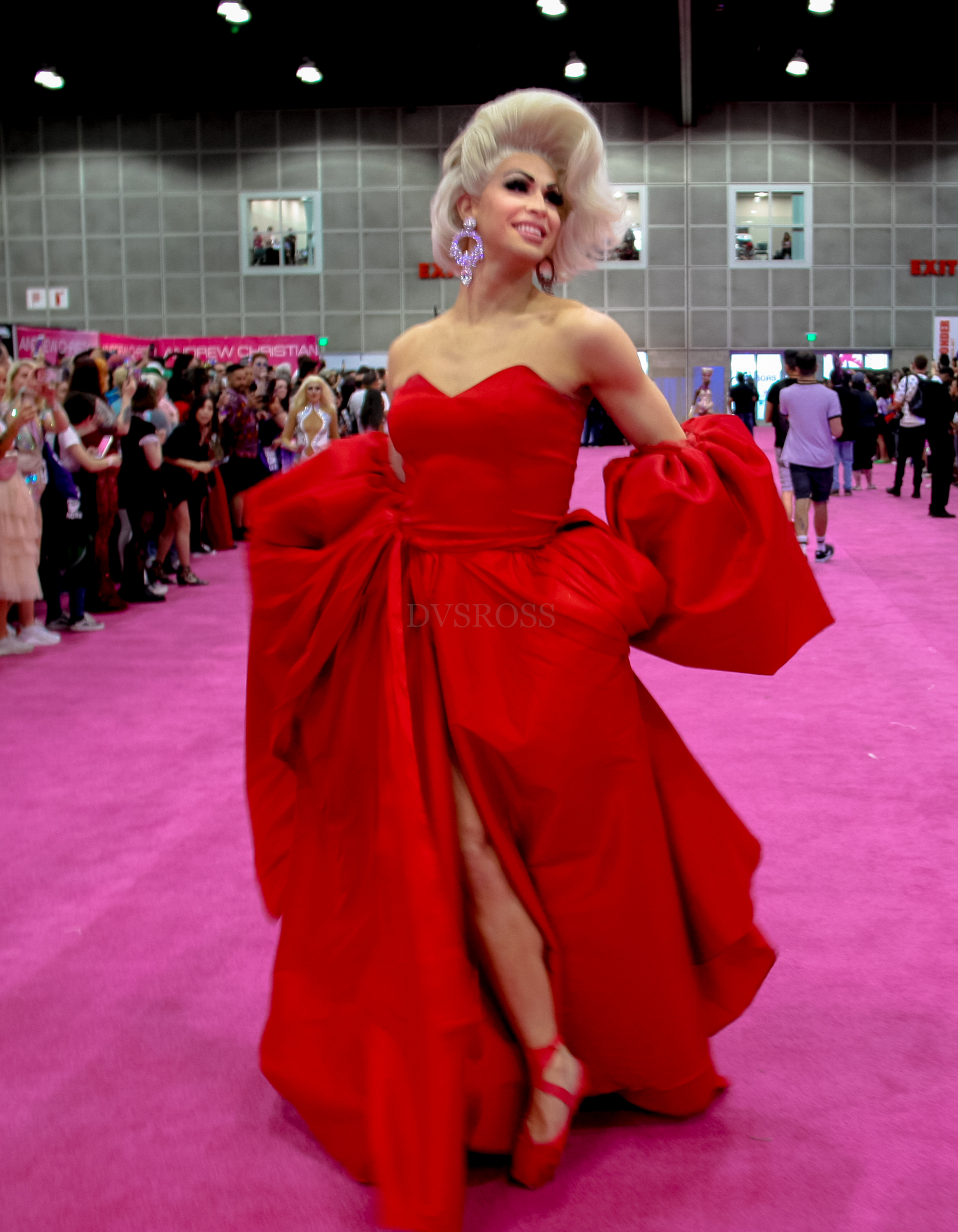
Brooke Lynn Hytes wins the episode's main challenge.

Fourteen new contestants enter the Werk Room. Vanessa Vanjie Mateo, who was eliminated first in the tenth season, returns to compete again. RuPaul enters and welcomes the group, then reveals the mini-challenge, which tasks contestants with participating in a photo shoot with former Drag Race competitors. The pairs are:

- Scarlet Envy with Raja
- Shuga Cain with Jasmine Masters
- Honey Davenport with Manila Luzon
- Ra'Jah O'Hara with Ginger Minj
- Vanessa Vanjie Mateo with Farrah Moan
- Brooke Lynn Hytes with Ongina
- Plastique Tiara with Sonique
- Soju and Victoria "Porkchop" Parker
- Ariel Versace with Eureka O'Hara
- Nina West with Raven
- Mercedes Iman Diamond with Delta Work
- Kahanna Montrese with Derrick Barry
- A'keria C. Davenport with Kimora Blac
- Silky Nutmeg Ganache with Mariah Paris Balenciaga
- Yvie Oddly with Adore Delano

The contestants get out of drag in the Werk Room after the photo shoots. RuPaul returns and reveals the main challenge, which tasks contestants with creating outfits using materials in trunks "belonging" to former competitors. RuPaul also reveals Silky Nutmeg Ganache is the winner of the mini-challenge, which means she gets to assign the trunks. Following are the paired contestants and trunk owners:

- A'keria C. Davenport – BeBe Zahara Benet
- Ariel Versace – Laganja Estranja
- Brooke Lynn Hytes – Detox
- Honey Davenport – BenDeLaCreme
- Kahanna Montrese – Katya
- Mercedes Iman Diamond – Bianca Del Rio
- Nina West – Thorgy Thor
- Plastique Tiara – Sasha Velour
- Ra'Jah O'Hara – Kennedy Davenport
- Scarlet Envy – Violet Chachki
- Shuga Cain – Sharon Needles
- Silky Nutmeg Ganache – Peppermint
- Soju – Kim Chi
- Vanessa Vanjie Mateo – Valentina
- Yvie Oddly – Alaska

The contestants start to design their looks. Disguised as Barry Johnson ("BJ"), guest judge Miley Cyrus goes undercover be pretending to be a member of the crew in the Werk Room. Cyrus reveals herself and meets the contestants. On the main stage, RuPaul welcome fellow judges Michelle Visage, Carson Kressley, and Ross Mathews, as well as Cyrus. A'keria C. Davenport, Brooke Lynn Hytes, Plastique Tiara, and Vanessa Vanjie Mateo receive positive critiques, and Brooke Lynn Hytes wins the challenge. Kahanna Montrese, Mercedes Iman Diamond, Nina West, and Soju receive negative critiques, and Mercedes Iman Diamond and Nina West are deemed safe. Kahanna Montrese and Soju place in the bottom and face off in a lip-sync to "The Best of Both Worlds" (2006) by Cyrus. Kahanna Montrese wins the lip-sync and Soju is eliminated from the competition.

== Production ==
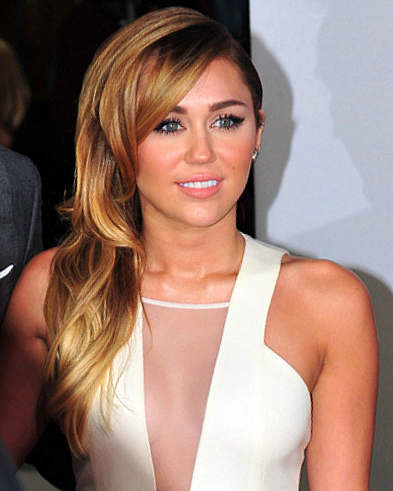
Miley Cyrus is a guest judge

The episode originally aired on February 28, 2019.

Vanessa Vanjie Mateo is the first contestant to enter the Werk Room. She hides behind a screen while some of the other contestants arrive. When the contestants mention her, she reveals herself to the group as a returning competitor.

Contestant Soju discusses having a cyst on the main stage, prompting her to become a "viral sensation", according to Gay Times. Stephen Saw of Billboard described Soju's story "sweet-but-stomach-curling".

=== Fashion ===
Scarlet Envy's entrance look is inspired by The Birth of Venus (pictured).

For her entrance look, Vanessa Vanjie Mateo wears a red dress, red high heels, and a blonde wig. Nina West wears a yellow dress and a black hat. She has sunglasses, black gloves, and a black handbag. Shuga Cain has a black catsuit and a light purple wig. Plastique Tiara's dress is purple. Mercedes Iman Diamond wears a white dress and carries long jewels. Scarlet Envy has a handfan and a red wig. Her outfit depicts The Birth of Venus. Honey Davenport's outfit is black and yellow. A'keria C. Davenport's outfit is black and silver. She has large earrings. Yvie Oddly has a green dress and gold jewelry. She controls a toy car with a remote. Silly Nutmeg Ganache has a blue outfit, from which she pulls out a chocolate chip cookie. Brook Lynn Hytes presents a Red Serge-inspired outfit. She wears a blonde wig. Ariel Versace's dress is white and her blonde wig has colorful ends. Ra'Jah O'Hara's outfit appears to be made of newspapers. Kahanna Montrese has a light pink wig. Soju wears an outfit inspired by a black-and-white martial arts uniform.

For the photo shoot, Raja's red outfit has exaggerated shoulders. Jasmine Masters has a purple gown. Manila Luzon wears a white outfit and a blonde wig. Ginger Minj wears a black dress and a blonde wig. Farrah Moan has a pink dress and a light pink wig. Ongina has a red dress. Sonique has a blonde wig. Victoria "Porkchop" Parker has a black and silver gown. Eureka has a black and purple dress and a blonde wig. Raven has a short white dress. Delta Work gas a black and gold dress. Derrick Barry gas a dark blue outfit with blue boots and a blonde wig. Kimora Black has a red outfit and red boots. Mariah Paris Balenciaga's outfit is red. Adore Delano wears black leather, black boots, and a black hat.

For the fashion show, Plastique Tiara wears a dress with red roses. She also has a rose in her hair. Brook Lynn Hytes has a blue and yellow superhero outfit. Honey Davenport wears a blue and pink outfit with pink ruffles and a pink headpiece. Arial Versace has a green cannabis- and Poison Ivy-inspired outfit with fake marijuana leaves. She has a red wig. Yvie Oddly wears a short pink dress, pink shoes, and a plastic jacket. A'keria C. Davenport's exaggerated hair is made from multiple wigs. Scarlet Envy has a red dress, a matching hat, and a black boa. Soju's look is inspired by Korean fashion. Ra'Jah O'Hara has tall red boots and a rainbow belt. Mercedes Iman Diamond has a blue outfit and blue boots. Shuga Cain wears a black dress with matching shoes and a blonde wig. Vanessa Vanjie Mateo's dress is red with a black print. Silky Nutmeg Ganache has a pencil skirt with green sequins. Nina West's dress is orange and she wears a similarly-colored wig. Kahana Montrese has an asymmetrical black-and-red outfit.

== Reception ==
Kate Kulzick of The A.V. Club gave the episode a rating of 'B'. Kevin O'Keeffe opined, "For 90 minutes, this episode does a lot to set the season up moving forward. Unfortunately, setting up narrative forces is a bit like setting up chess pieces: dull. Combined with some odd pacing, and Season 11’s first installment is a far cry from the razor-sharp premiere of All Stars 4." Sam Brooks ranked "Best of Both World" number 150 in The Spinoff's 2019 "definitive ranking" of the show's 162 lip-sync performances to date. Out magazine said "it was pretty clear that Kahanna out-performed her costar".

The episode earned director Nick Murray a nomination in the Outstanding Directing for a Reality Program category at the 71st Primetime Emmy Awards. It also earned Zaldy a nomination in the Excellence in Variety, Reality-Competition, Live Television category at the 22nd Costume Designers Guild Awards.

== See also ==
- Miley Cyrus videography
