= Digital Drag Fest =

Drag event series

- Start date: March 27, 2020
- End date: May 30, 2020
- No. of shows: 200+

Digital Drag Fest was a digital drag concert series hosted by Producer Entertainment Group. Beginning on March 27, 2020, it was originally supposed to be a limited engagement until April 12 but, due to overwhelming demand, the series was extended to May 30. The aim of the series is to allow drag and LGBTQ performers who have had shows cancelled due to the COVID-19 pandemic a chance to perform for their fans. 50 percent of the proceeds from the event's merchandise would be donated to GLAAD, and several performers from the event also pledged a portion of their ticket sales to the organization.

== Performances ==
- March 27, 2020 - Michelle Visage, Nina West (twice), Monét X Change, John Cameron Mitchell, Alaska (twice)
- March 28, 2020 - A'keria Chanel Davenport, Silky Nutmeg Ganache, Ginger Minj, Miz Cracker (twice)
- March 29, 2020 - Alaska (three times), BenDeLaCreme, Jinkx Monsoon (four times), Trinity The Tuck (twice)
- March 30, 2020 - Landon Cider, Jaida Essence Hall
- April 1, 2020 - Manila Luzon, Brandon Stansell
- April 2, 2020 - Jiggly Caliente, Sherry Vine
- April 3, 2020 - Shea Couleé, Valentina, The Boulet Brothers (twice), Jujubee, Monét X Change, Jackie Beat, BenDeLaCreme, Nicky Doll, Todrick Hall
- April 4, 2020 - Dahlia Sin, Jinkx Monsoon, Widow Von'Du, Divina de Campo (twice), Trinity The Tuck, Alaska (three times), Peppermint, AB Farrelly, Sharon Needles (twice), Alexis Michelle
- April 5, 2020 - Sharon Needles, Todrick Hall, Silky Nutmeg Ganache, Baga Chipz (twice), Vinegar Strokes, Delta Work, Shuga Cain, Jinkx Monsoon, Scarlet Envy, John Cameron Mitchell, Raja Gemini, Tom Goss, Rhea Litré
- April 6, 2020 - Nina West, Virginia West, Brita Filter, Ginger Minj, Marti Gould Cummings, Jan Sport, Cynthia Lee Fontaine, Heklina
- April 7, 2020 - Ian Verdun, Mercedes Iman Diamond, Tina Burner, Sasha Colby, Heidi N Closet, Maddelynn Hatter
- April 8, 2020 - Dusty Ray Bottoms, Betty Bitschlap, Kimora Blac, Nina West, Varla Jean Merman, Miz Cracker (twice), Fena Barbitall
- April 9, 2020 - Blu Hydrangea, Cheryl Hole, Rosé, Rock M Sakura (twice), Venus D Lite, Honey Davenport
- April 10, 2020 - Crystal, Sum Ting Wong, Latrice Royale (twice), Ginger Minj, Aja, Candis Cayne, BenDeLaCreme, Sonique,
- April 11, 2020 - Tinus, Todrick Hall, Kitty Tray, Daniel Franzese, Sharon Needles (twice), Aurora Sexton, Jinkx Monsoon, Laganja Estranja, Leah Allyce Canali
- April 12, 2020 - Lady German, Silky Nutmeg Ganache, Gia Gunn, Pandora Boxx, Jan Sport, Jackie Cox, John Cameron Mitchell
- April 13, 2020 - Manila Luzon (twice), Peppermint
- April 14, 2020 - Nicky Doll
- April 15, 2020 - Miz Cracker (twice), Geoffrey Mac, Raja Gemini
- April 16, 2020 - Tammie Brown, Jai Rodriguez, Laganja Estranja
- April 17, 2020 - Sum Ting Wong, The Boulet Brothers (twice), Mimi Imfurst (as Carole Baskin), Gloria Swansong, BenDeLaCreme, Delta Work, Jonny McGovern & Juicy Red Couture
- April 18, 2020 - Lady Starlight, Jackie Cox, Shea Coulee, Todrick Hall, Bob the Drag Queen (three times), Calpernia Addams, Jan Sport, Mrs. Kasha Davis, Lagoona Bloo, Jinkx Monsoon
- April 19, 2020 (Snatch Game Day) - Ginger Minj (as Adele), Baga Chipz (as Margaret Thatcher), Alexis Michelle (as Liza Minnelli), Kennedy Davenport (as Little Richard, Bob the Drag Queen (as Carol Channing) Alaska (as Mae West) (twice), Trinity The Tuck (as Caitlyn Jenner), Nina West (as Jo Anne Worley), Jinkx Monsoon (as Little Edie) (twice), Sharon Needles (as Michelle Visage)
- April 20 - Alaska & Jeremy, Jackie Beat, Sherry Vine, Deven Green
- April 21 (Drag Out The Vote Day) - Ginger Minj, Brita Filter (twice), Jackie Cox, Jan Sport, Alaska
- April 22 - Dahlia Sin, Ariel Versace, Heidi N Closet, Karina Kay
- April 23 - The Katherine, Pandora Boxx, Hibiscus, Kennedy Davenport, Indigo, Kendoll, Heklina, Jaja the Qween
- April 24 - Blu Hydrangea, Cheryl Hole, Maddelyn Hatter, Crystal, Frankie Grande, Tracy Young, Jinkx Monsoon, Brandon Stansell, Jill Sobule, Adam Mac
- April 25 -Baga Chipz, Divina De Campo, Tynomi Banks, Jujubee, BenDeLaCreme (twice), Todrick Hall, Priyanka, Sharon Needles, Mocha Diva
- April 26 - Cascada, Karma B, Maxi Glamour, Stephen Trask, Marla Jean Merman, Nina West (twice), John Cameron Mitchell, Big Dipper, Kelly Osbourne, Tammie Brown
- April 27 - Rock M Sakura, Nicky Doll
- April 28 - Scarlet Envy
- April 29 - Blair St. Clair, Jan Sport, Manila Luzon, Candis Cayne
- April 30 - Jinkx Monsoon, Ginger Minj, Miz Cracker, Delta Work, Sherry Vine, Jackie Beat
- May 1 - Alaska, Sharon Needles,
- May 2 - Jinkx Monsoon, Jan Sport, Latrice Royale, Nicky Doll, Sharon Needles
- May 3 - Silky Nutmeg Ganache, BenDeLaCreme, Abhora, Trinity The Tuck, Widow Von'Du, Sharon Needles
- May 7 - Miz Cracker
- May 8 - Mrs. Kasha Davis, Tammie Brown, Alaska
- May 9 - Jackie Cox, Jinkx Monsoon, Alaska, Jan Sport, Nicky Doll, Latrice Royale, Brandon Stansell
- May 10 - Silky Nutmeg Ganache, Landon Cider, Bob the Drag Queen, Alaska (twice), BenDeLaCreme, Trinity The Tuck, Widow Von'Du, Raja
- May 12 - Rock M. Sakura
- May 14 - Gloria Swansong, Jinkx Monsoon, Aja, Sherry Vine, Fena Barbitall
- May 15 - Tammie Brown, Geoffrey Mac, Latrice Royale, Miz Cracker, Kennedy Davenport, Rock M. Sakura, Raja
- May 16 (The Grammy Museum Presents: Writing with Pride) - Trixie Mattel, Justin Tranter, & Leland, Alaska, Bright Light Bright Light, Nina West, Ginger Minj, Wrabel, Manila Luzon, Jinkx Monsoon, Sharon Needles, BeBe Zahara Benet
- May 17 - Divina De Campo, Bob the Drag Queen, Darienne Lake, BenDeLaCreme (twice), Jackie Cox, Delta Work, Jackie Beat, Calpernia Addams, Lesley Wolf, Mindy Fire, Aquarella
- May 21 - Garrett Clayton, Delighted ToBeHere, Kennedy Davenport, Candis Cayne, Alexis Michelle
- May 22 - Nichole S. Panic, Kaykay Lavelle, Cynthia Lee Fontaine, Nicky Doll
- May 23 - Leah Allyce Canali, Jill Sobule, Widow Von'Du, Manila Luzon, Heidi N Closet, Alaska, Frankie Grande, Hibiscus
- May 24 - Jujubee, Jonny McGovern & Lady Red Couture: DDF Awards Red Carpet Pre-Show, Digital Drag Fest Awards 2020, The Boulet Brothers (twice)
- May 28 - Jackie Beat
- May 29 - Sophie B. Hawkins, Jinkx Monsoon, Brandon Stansell, Laganja Estranja
- May 30 - Paola Hoffman, Simona Sventura, Crystal, Cheryl Hole, Tina Twirler
