= Diva Worship =

- RuPaul's Drag Race episode
- Episode no.: Season 11; Episode 3
- Presented by: RuPaul
- Original air date: March 14, 2019

Guest appearances
- Guillermo Díaz (guest judge); Troye Sivan (guest judge)

Episode chronology
| ← Previous "Good God Girl, Get Out" | Next → "Trump: The Rusical" |
- RuPaul's Drag Race season 11

"Diva Worship" is the third episode of the eleventh season of the American television series RuPaul's Drag Race. It originally aired on March 14, 2019. The episode's main challenge tasks the contestants with performing in evangelical-inspired talk shows worshipping music divas. Guillermo Díaz and Troye Sivan are guest judges. Nina West wins the main challenge. Honey Davenport is eliminated from the competition after placing in the bottom six and losing a lip-sync contest to "Waiting for Tonight (Hex Hector Mix)" by Jennifer Lopez.

== Episode ==
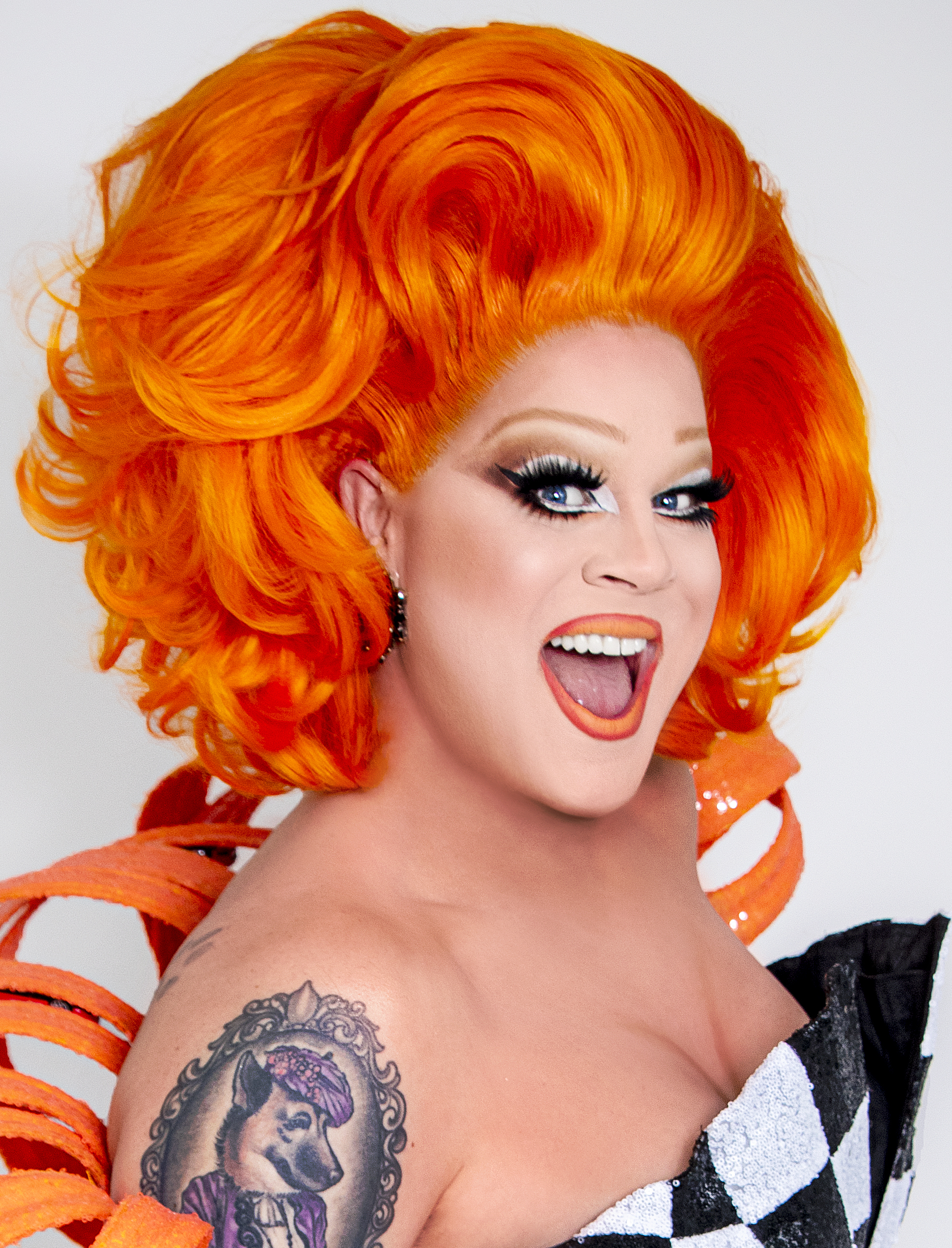
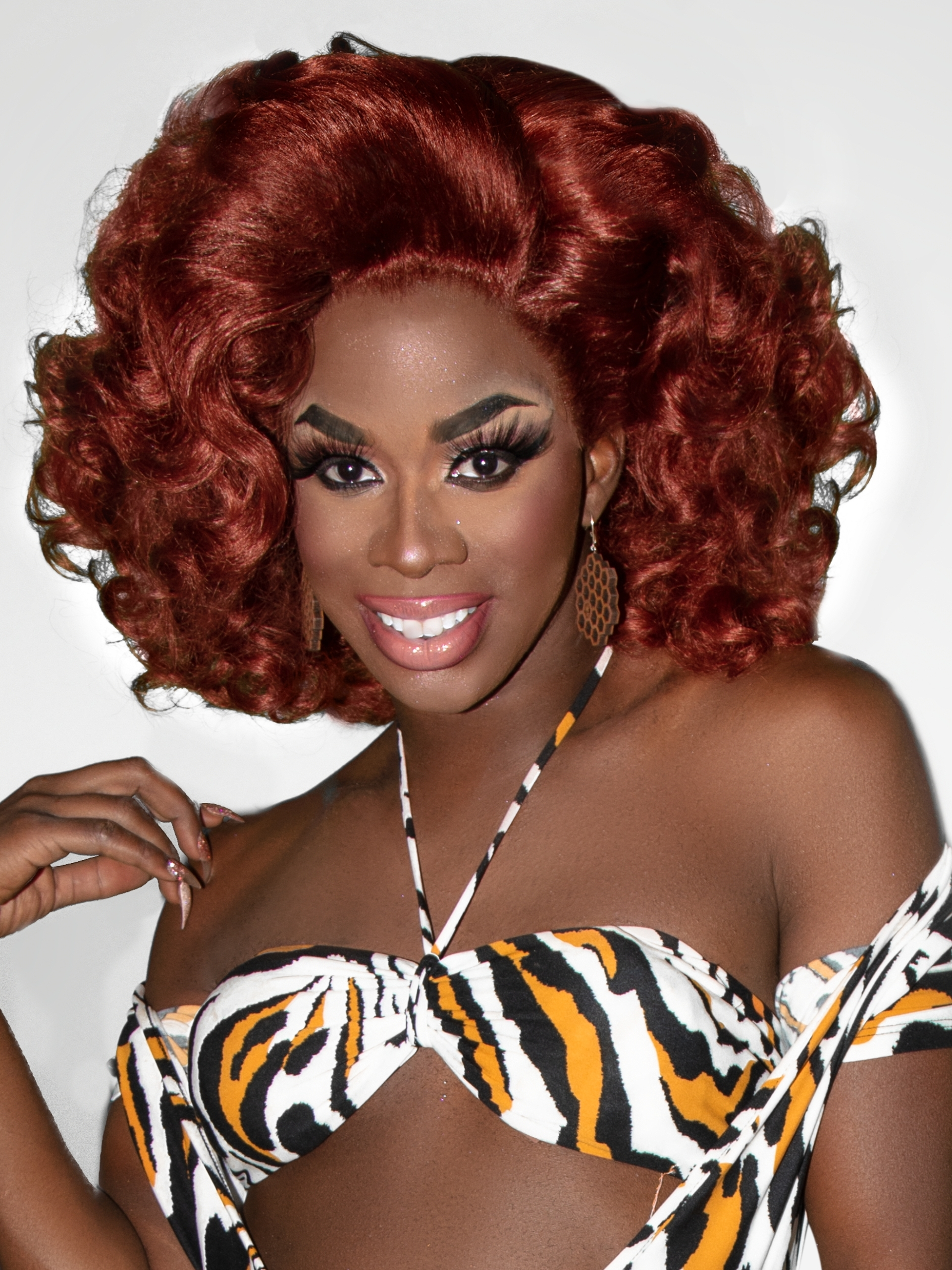
Nina West (left, pictured in 2020) wins the episode's main challenge; Honey Davenport (right, pictured in 2020) is eliminated from the competition.

The contestants return to the Werk Room after Kahanna Montrese's elimination on the previous episode. On a new day, RuPaul greets the group and reveals the mini-challenge, which tasks the contestants with "seducing" (using a humorous power of persuasion) their way into a Seduction concert. Nina West and Ra'Jah O'Hara win the mini-challenge.

RuPaul then reveals the main challenge, which tasks the contestants with starring in one of two "she-vangelical" (evangelical-inspired) talk shows worshipping divas. As the winners of the mini-challenge, Nina West and Ra'Jah O'Hara are captains and select their fellow team members. The groups start to brainstorm about which diva they want to worship. The team with Ariel Versace, Brooke Lynn Hytes, Mercedes Iman Diamond, Nina West, Silky Nutmeg Ganache, Vanessa Vanjie Mateo, and Yvie Oddly select Britney Spears. The team with A'keria C. Davenport, Honey Davenport, Plastique Tiara, Ra'Jah O'Hara, Scarlet Envy, and Shuga Cain select Mariah Carey. RuPaul returns to the Werk Room to meet with both groups, asking questions and offering advice. The groups film with Ross Mathews.

On elimination day, the contestants make final preparations in the Werk Room for the fashion show. Some of the contestants notice the connection between Brooke Lynn Hytes and Vanessa Vanjie Mateo. Others talk about Mercedes Iman Diamond's religion (Islam). Yvie Oddly gets nude to paint her entire body pink. On the main stage, RuPaul welcomes judges Michelle Visage and Mathews, as well as guest judges Guillermo Díaz and Troye Sivan. RuPaul reveals the runway category ("Fringe"), then the fashion show commences. The judges deliver their critiques, deliberate, then share the results with the group. Team Britney Spears is the winning team, and Nina West wins the challenge. Team Mariah Carey is the losing team, and A'keria C. Davenport, Honey Davenport, Plastique Tiara, Ra'Jah O'Hara, Scarlet Envy, and Shuga Cain are announced as the bottom six. They face off in a lip-sync contest to "Waiting for Tonight (Hex Hector Mix)" by Jennifer Lopez. A'keria C. Davenport, Plastique Tiara, Ra'Jah O'Hara, Scarlet Envy, and Shuga Cain win the lip-sync and Honey Davenport is eliminated from the competition.

== Production and broadcast ==
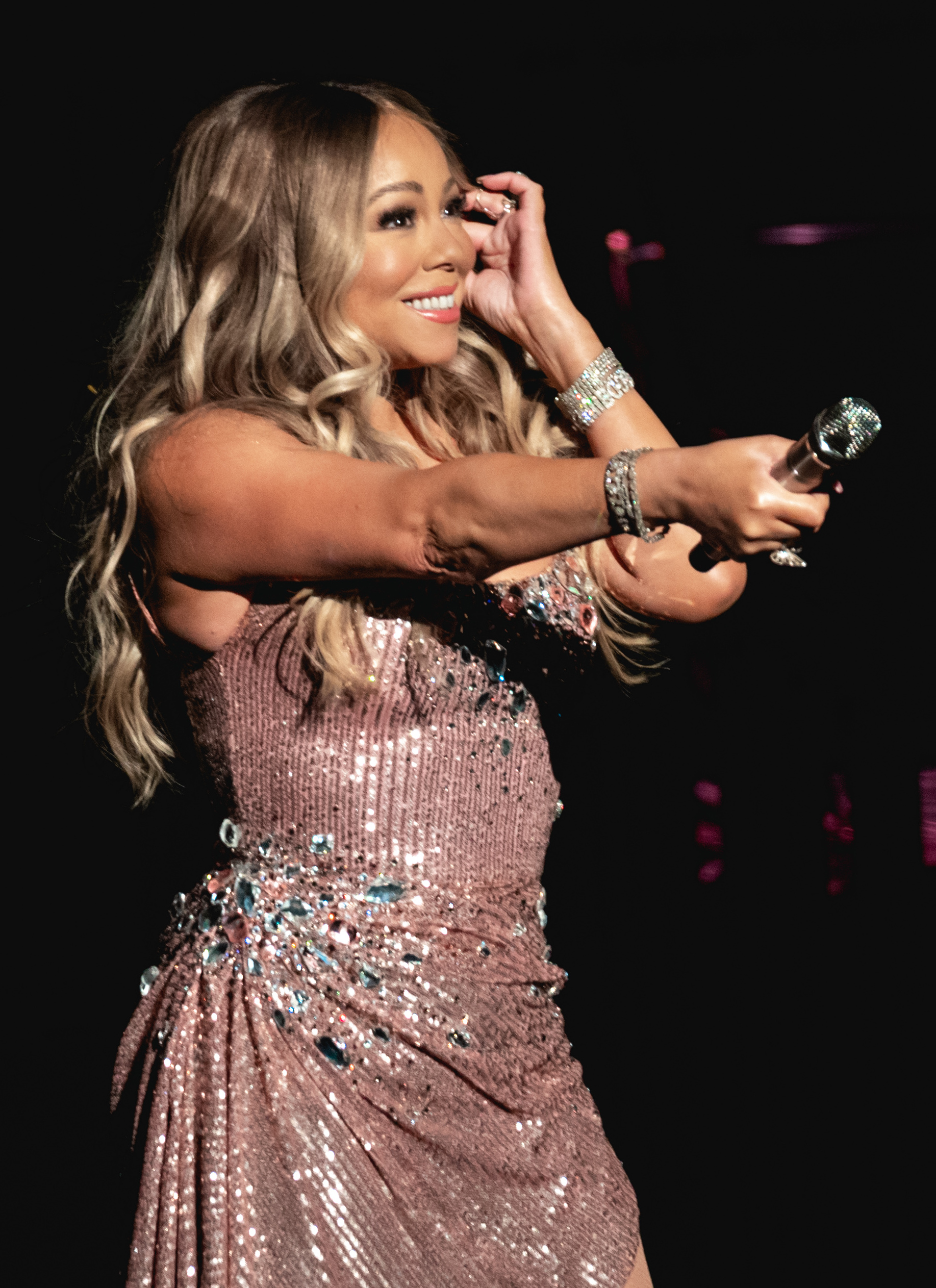
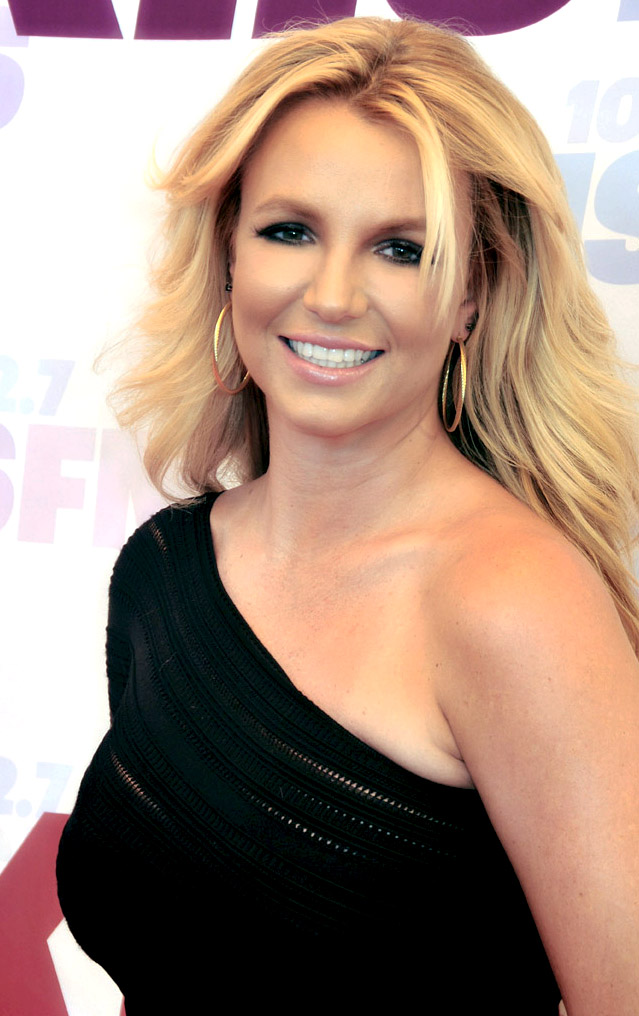
The episode sees contestants "worship" divas Mariah Carey (left, pictured in 2019) and Britney Spears (right, pictured in 2013).
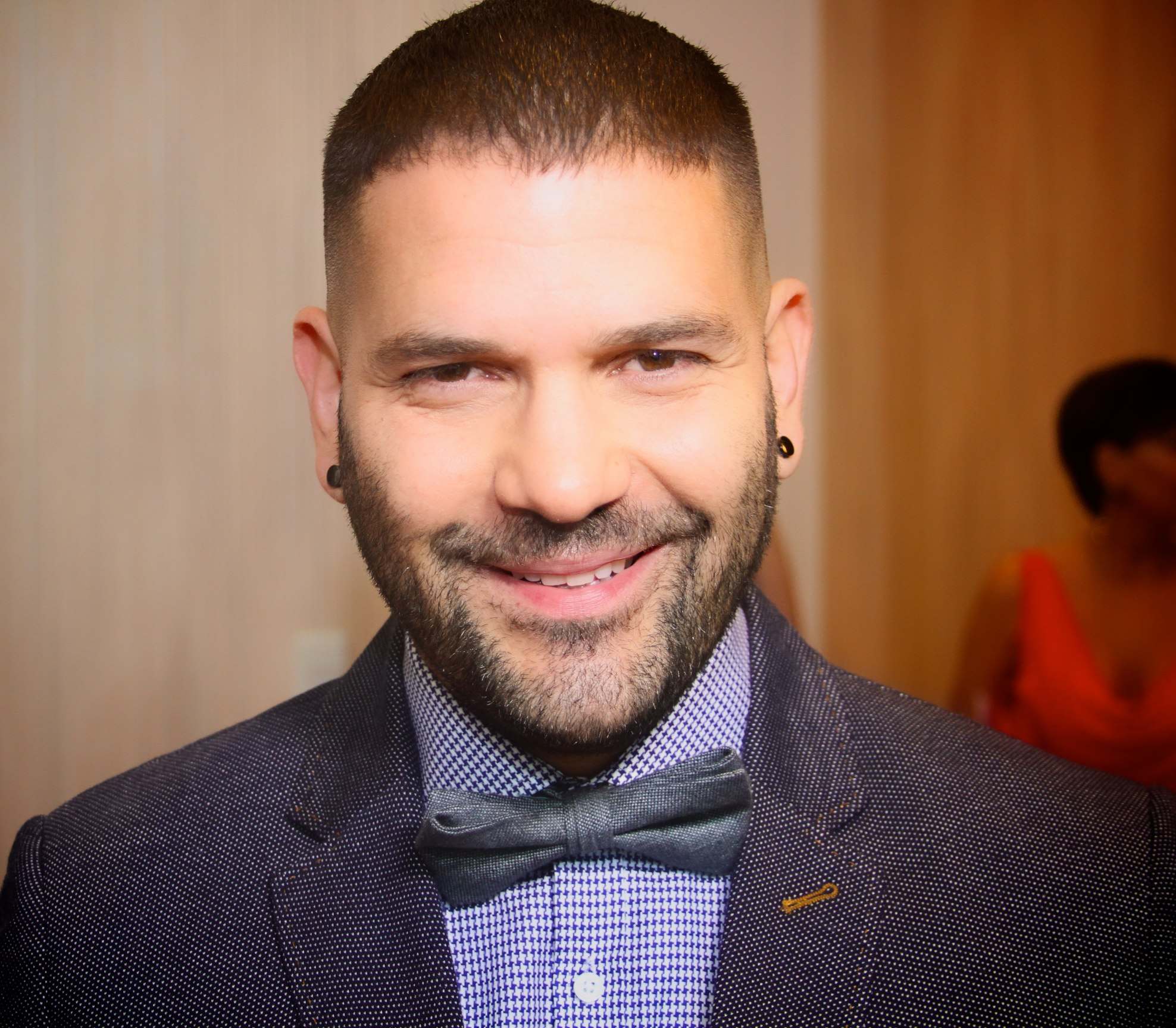
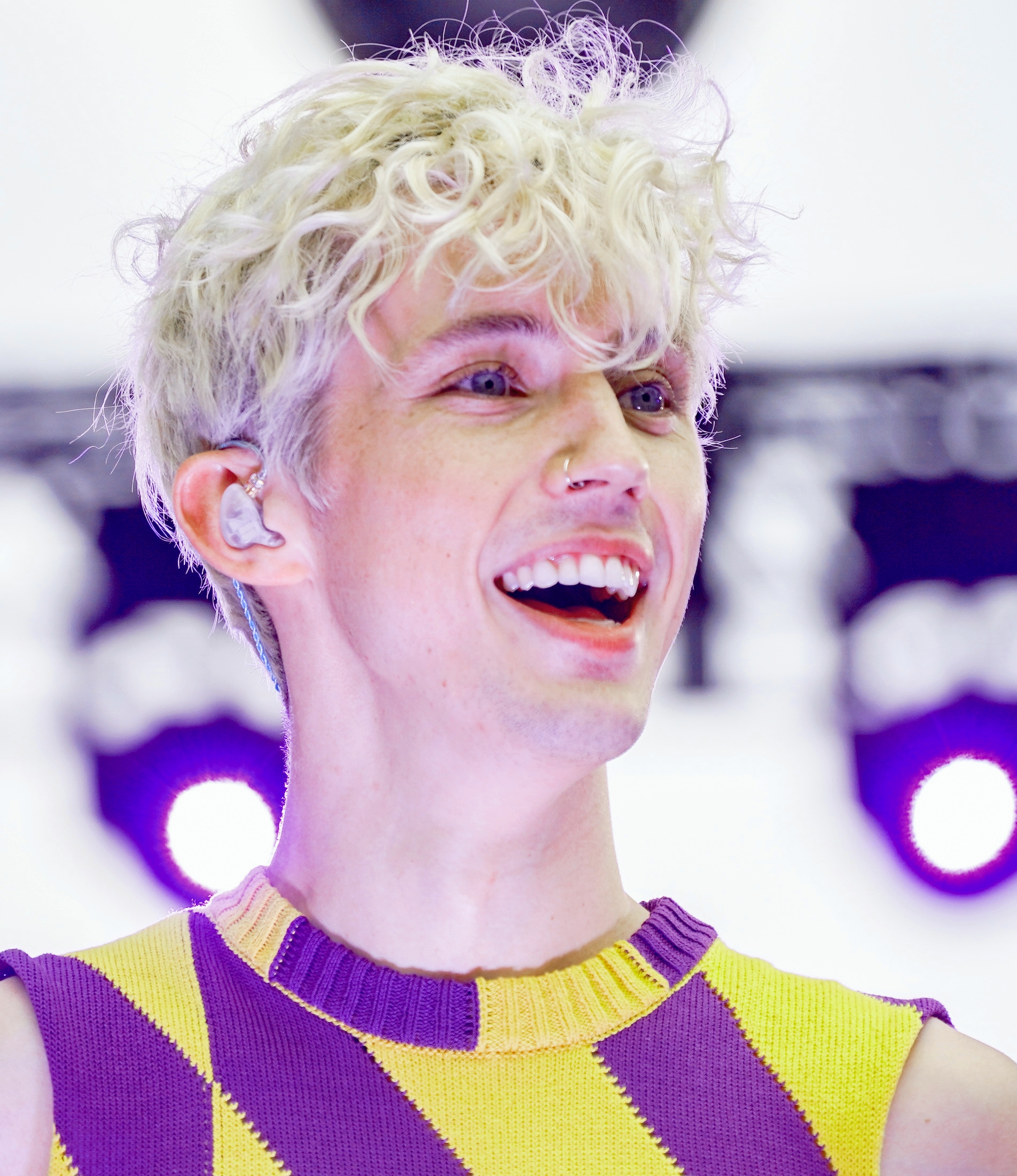
Guillermo Díaz (left, pictured in 2013) and Troye Sivan (right, pictured in 2018) are guest judges.

The episode originally aired on March 14, 2019.

The six-person lip-sync contest spawned multiple memes. Honey Davenport, who stumbled off the stage during the contest, has said, "I was thinking, ‘This can not be the moment that I go home. This cannot be the way it ends for me.’ I just had so much more to offer in that competition and I did not want this to be my final bow."

=== Fashion ===
For the fashion show, the contestants present looks with fringe. Honey Davenport's Lady Gaga-inspired outfit is black and she wears a large black hat. Scarlet Envy wears a short white outfit and a matching wig. Shuga Cain has a Native American-inspired look with feathers. Her wig is brown. Plastique Tiara has a long ponytail. A'keria C. Davenport has a black-and-gold outfit with a large headpiece. R'Jah O'Hara has a red outfit with tall matching boots and a red wig. Nina West also wears a headpiece. Brooke Lynn Hytes wears a Coachella and Woodstock-inspired floral outfit and a long blonde wig. Vanessa Vanjie Mateo has a Cher- and Bob Mackie-inspired short red outfit and a long brown wig. Yvie Oddle's outfit resembles a jellyfish. Mercedes Iman Diamond's outfit is neon green and she wears a red wig. Ariel Versace's holographic-inspired outfit is light blue and pink; she wears a pink wig. Silky Nutmeg Ganache has a blue dress, white shoes, and a dark wig.

== Reception ==
Kate Kulzick of The A.V. Club gave the episode a rating of 'B+'. Writing for Vulture, Matt Rogers rated the episode three out of five stars. Emma Kelly of Metro described the Carey sketch as "disastrous" and Ryan Shea of Instinct called the team's performance "a monstrosity". Kevin O'Keeffe of Xtra Magazine opined, "I think Honey was destined to go this week with or without a six-way lip sync, what with her disastrous musical tribute to Mariah Carey. But her flailing about on the ground to the tune of 'Waiting for Tonight' did her no favours." Joey Nolfi of Entertainment Weekly said the "I don't know her" meme in which Carey shares her thoughts on Lopez "made the Mariah Carey team lip-syncing to a Jennifer Lopez song at the end extra hilarious". Rashad Sultana of Queerty questioned why producers chose to use the song's dance remix. Sam Brooks ranked the "Waiting for Tonight" performance number 156 in The Spinoff's 2019 "definitive ranking" of the show's 162 lip-sync contests to date.

== See also ==
- Cultural impact of Mariah Carey
