= Good God Girl, Get Out =

- RuPaul's Drag Race episode
- Episode no.: Season 11; Episode 2
- Presented by: RuPaul
- Original air date: March 7, 2019

Guest appearances
- Bobby Moynihan (guest judge); Sydelle Noel (guest judge); Derrick Barry

Episode chronology
| ← Previous "Whatcha Unpackin?" | Next → "Diva Worship" |
- RuPaul's Drag Race season 11

"Good God Girl, Get Out" is the second episode of the eleventh season of the American television series RuPaul's Drag Race. It originally aired on March 7, 2019. The episode's main challenge tasks the contestants with performing in drag film adaptions of Black Panther (2018) and Get Out (2017). Bobby Moynihan and Sydelle Noel are guest judges. Scarlet Envy and Yvie Oddly win the main challenge. Kahanna Montrese is eliminated from the competition after placing in the bottom and losing a lip-sync contest against Mercedes Iman Diamond to "Work Bitch" (2013) by Britney Spears.

== Episode ==
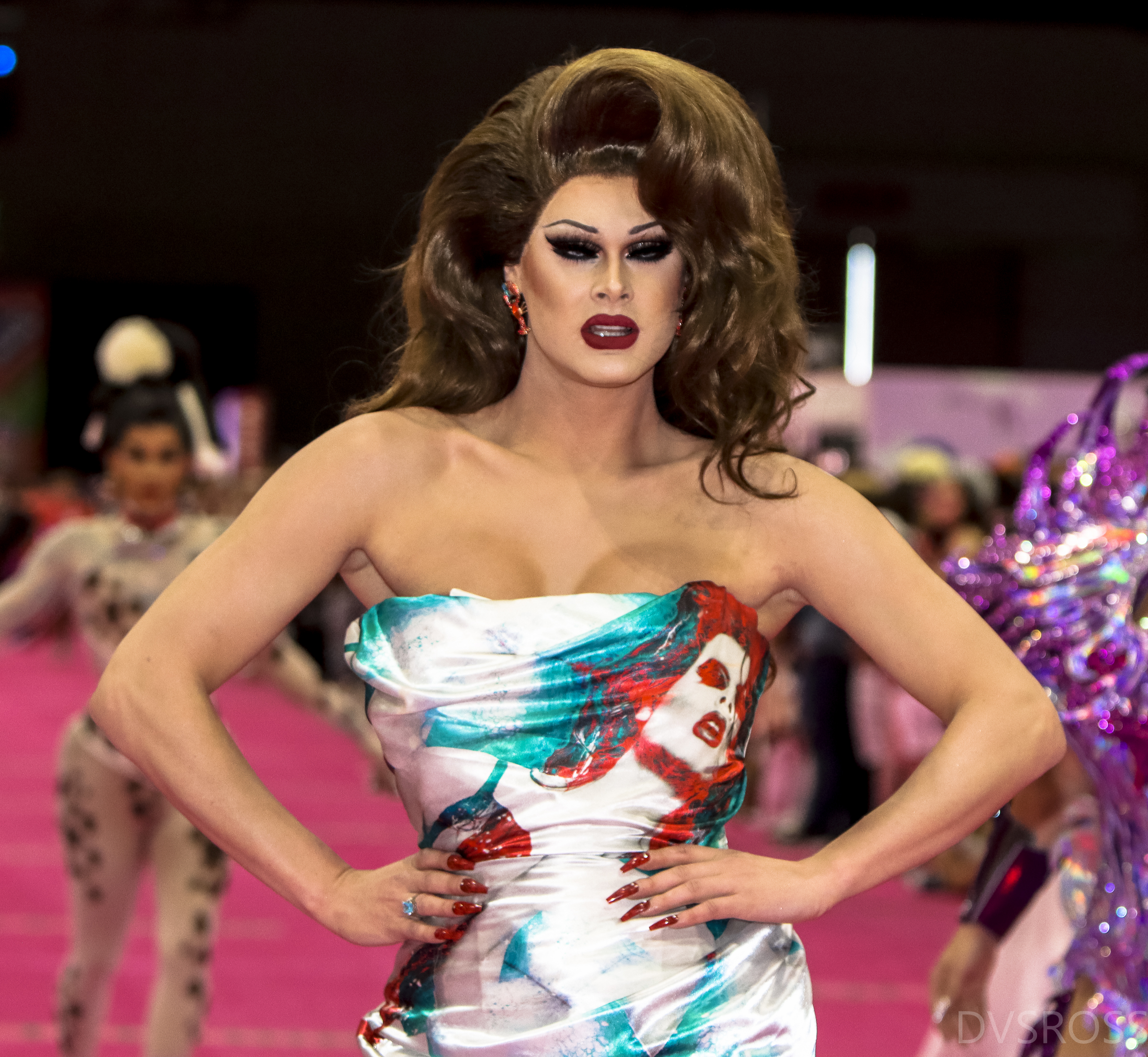
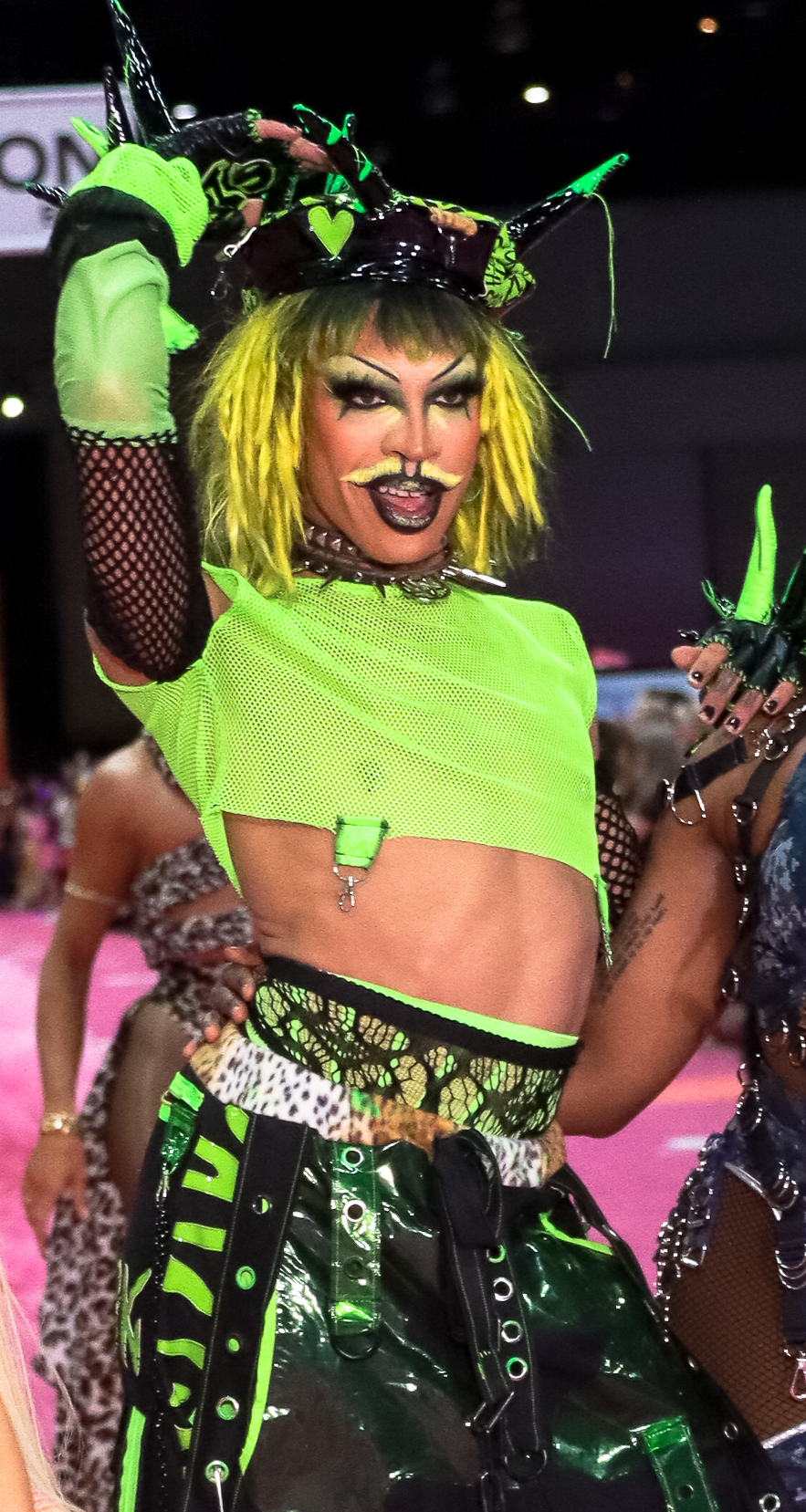
Scarlet Envy (left, pictured at RuPaul's DragCon LA in 2022) and Yvie Oddly (right, pictured at the same event in 2023) are the winners of the episode's main challenge.

For this episode's mini-challenge, the contestants photobomb celebrity pictures. Brooke Lynn Hytes and Silky Nutmeg Ganache win the mini-challenge. For the main challenge, the contestants are tasked with performing in drag film adaptions of Black Panther (2018) and Get Out (2017). Team Good God Girl, Get Out! includes A'keria C. Davenport, Kahanna Montrese, Mercedes Iman Diamond, Silky Nutmeg Ganache, Scarlet Envy, Vanessa Vanjie Mateo, and Yvie Oddly. Team Why It Gotta Be Black, Panther? includes Ariel Versace, Brooke Lynn Hytes, Honey Davenport, Nina West, Plastique Tiara, Ra'Jah O'Hara, and Shuga Cain.

On the main stage, RuPaul welcomes judges Michelle Visage and Ross Mathews, as well as guest judges Bobby Moynihan and Sydelle Noel. RuPaul reveals the runway category ("What's Your Sign?"), then the fashion show commences. The judges deliver their critiques, deliberate, then share the results with the group. Plastique Tiara, Scarlet Envy, Shuga Cain, and Yvie Oddly receive positive critiques, and Scarlet Envy and Yvie Oddly win the challenge. Ariel Versace, Brooke Lynn Hytes, Kahanna Montrese, and Mercedes Iman Diamond receive negative critiques, and Ariel Versace and Brooke Lynn Hytes are deemed safe. Kahanna Montrese and Mercedes Iman Diamond place in the bottom and face off in a lip-sync contest to "Work Bitch" (2013) by Britney Spears. Mercedes Iman Diamond wins the lip-sync and Kahanna Montrese is eliminated from the competition.

== Production and broadcast ==
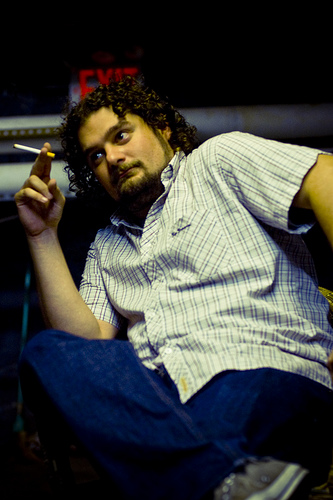
Bobby Moynihan is a guest judge.

The episode originally aired on March 7, 2019.

During the main challenge, Mercedes Iman Diamond struggles with the line, "Opulence, you own everything", which is derived from the 1990 documentary film Paris Is Burning and closely resembles a lyric from Brooke Candy's song "Opulence" (2014). Instead, Mercedes Iman Diamond repeats, "Oppalence! You earn everything!" The scene became a meme and was given a dance remix. Mercedes Iman Diamond has said: "I practiced! I worked with Monique Heart a couple weeks ago, and we practiced but it still wasn’t working! I was so scared for that episode because I thought I made a fool of myself because I couldn’t pronounce the word and I thought people were going to laugh at me and make fun of me, but it turned into the opposite. Even Brooke Candy messaged me! She tweeted about me and messaged me."

=== Fashion ===
Brooke Lynn Hytes represents Pisces. Plastique Tiara represents Aries. Ra'Jah O'Hara represents Capricorn. Nina West and Honey Davenport represent Leo. Shuga Cain represents Scorpio. Ariel Versace also represents Aries, and Silky Nutmeg Ganache also represents Capricorn. Yvie Oddly's "digital lion" look represents Leo. Vanessa Vanjie Mateo represents Libra. A'keria C. Davenport represents Pisces. Mercedes Iman Diamond represents Sagittarius. Kahanna Montrese represents Aries. Scarlet Envy represents Pisces and creates bubbles on the runway.

== Reception ==
Kate Kulzick of The A.V. Club gave the episode a rating of 'B'. Writing for Vulture, Matt Rogers rated the episode four out of five stars. Bernardo Sim of Screen Rant said the episode was the season's best. J’na Jefferson of Vibe said "I saw the first spark of a champion" in A'keria C. Davenport during the episode's main challenge. Harvey Day ranked "Oppalence! You earn everything!" fourth in BBC's list of "funny memes from the last 10 years". Stephen Daw of Billboard opined, "We’re living for the 'opulence' memes, but we need Mercedes to show us some opulence of her own if she wants to stay in the competition."
