= Mercedes Iman Diamond =

Kenyan-American drag performer

- Born: December 12, 1987 (age 38); Mombasa, Kenya
- Other name: Curran
- Occupation: Drag queen
- Television: RuPaul's Drag Race (season 11)

Mercedes Iman Diamond is the stage name of Curran, a Kenyan-American drag performer who competed on season 11 of the American television series RuPaul's Drag Race. Curran was born and raised in Mombasa, Kenya, and moved to Minneapolis, Minnesota, where he created the drag persona Mercedes Iman Diamond and competed in pageants. Mercedes Iman Diamond was the first Muslim contestant on Drag Race; Internet memes of her appearance on the show went viral, and her lines in a parody film challenge inspired a dance remix by Adam Joseph.

== Early life ==
Curran was born on December 12, 1987, in Mombasa, Kenya. He moved to the United States at the age of eleven and created his drag persona Mercedes Iman Diamond at the Minneapolis club Gay 90s a decade later.

== Career ==
Mercedes Iman Diamond has a background in pageantry; she won the Miss Gay 90s pageant in 2016. She was also named Miss City of the Lakes, and was the second alternate in the pageant Miss Minnesota Continental.

Mercedes Iman Diamond was the first Muslim contestant on RuPaul's Drag Race; she competed in season 11 (2019). In the premiere episode "Whatcha Unpackin?", she performed poorly in the photo shoot mini-challenge and wore an outfit for the runway that was inspired by former Drag Race contestant Bianca Del Rio. The acting challenge on the second episode "Good God Girl, Get Out" required her to dance and recite dialogue in a parody of Get Out (2017) that was inspired by the film Paris Is Burning (1990). Internet memes of her struggling to pronounce "opulence" went viral, and her vocals received a dance remix from American singer-songwriter Adam Joseph. During a lip-sync battle to "Work Bitch" (2013) by Britney Spears, she subsequently eliminated her partner in the challenge Kahanna Montrese from the competition.

Despite her initial reluctance to discuss her identity, on the third episode ("Diva Worship"), Mercedes Iman Diamond described her experience of being racially profiled and placed on the No Fly List for years because she was from Kenya. She also said she had suffered from a stroke during a pageant as a result of demanding travel requirements. On the fourth episode "Trump: The Rusical", she portrayed Ivanka Trump in the Grease-inspired Rusical (musical theatre challenge) about Donald Trump and the women in his life. Her performance placed her in the bottom two and she was eliminated from the competition after losing a lip-sync against Ra'Jah O'Hara to James Brown's "Living in America" (1985).

She continues to perform in drag shows and has large followings on social media. She and Drag Race contestant Jaidynn Diore Fierce performed at the first drag brunch in Ely, Minnesota, in 2022.

== Personal life ==
Curran lives in Minneapolis. He is gay.

Mercedes Iman Diamond is the "drag daughter" (mentee) of Prada Diamond.

== Filmography ==
=== Television ===
- RuPaul's Drag Race (season 11)

=== Web series ===
- Whatcha Packin' (2019)
- Look at Huh (2020)

== See also ==
- LGBTQ people and Islam
