= Roscoe's =

Gay bar in Chicago, Illinois, U.S.

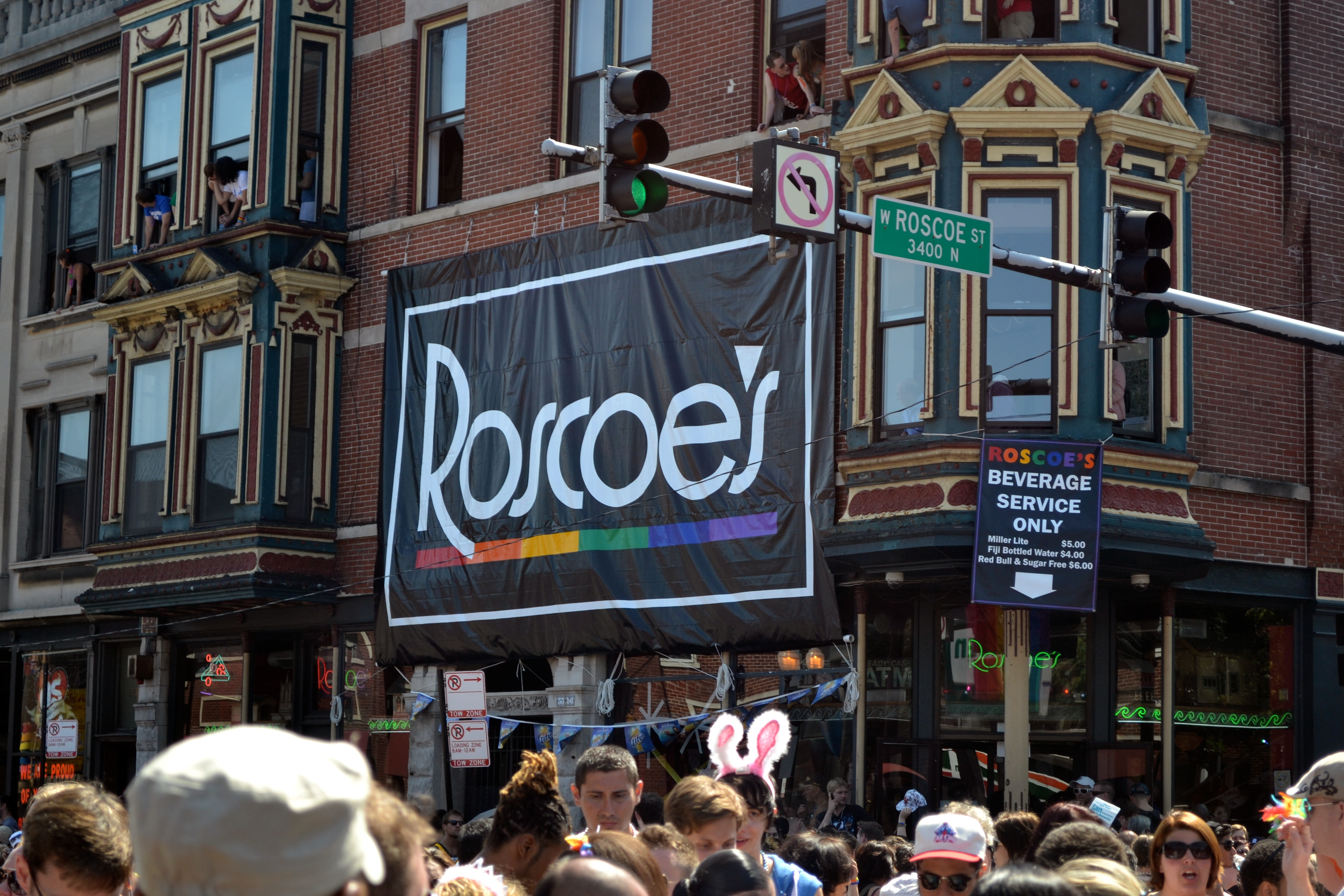
- Interactive map of Roscoe's
- Address: 3356 North Halsted Street; Chicago, Illinois; United States
- Coordinates: 41°56′36.5″N 87°38′58.5″W
- Type: Gay bar

Construction
- Opened: 1987

Website
- roscoes.com

Roscoe's Tavern, or simply Roscoe's, is a gay bar in Chicago, in the U.S. state of Illinois.

== Description ==
Roscoe's is a gay bar in Chicago. It has multiple bars, a dance floor, and an outdoor patio. Logo TV has said the bar is "known as a haunt for younger gay guys and their straight girlfriends". Roscoe's plays music videos and hosts drag performances, as well as karaoke, dueling pianos, and RuPaul's Drag Race viewing parties.

== History ==
The bar opened in 1987.

Mick Jagger visited the bar in 2018, where he saw performances by RuPaul's Drag Race contestants Aja and Milk. For the thirteenth season of RuPaul's Drag Race, contestant Denali performed a virtual lip sync from Roscoe's. Kevin Aviance performed at the bar in 2023.

== Reception ==
Frommer's has rated the bar one out of three stars. CBS Chicago included Roscoe's in a 2010 list of the top five gays bars in Boystown. In 2015, the ride-sharing company Lyft recognized the bar as one of Chicago's most-visited restaurants and bars. Grace Perry included Roscoe's in Eater Chicago's 2018 list of the city's fourteen "essential" LGBTQ bars.
