= Soju (drag queen) =

South Korean-American drag queen

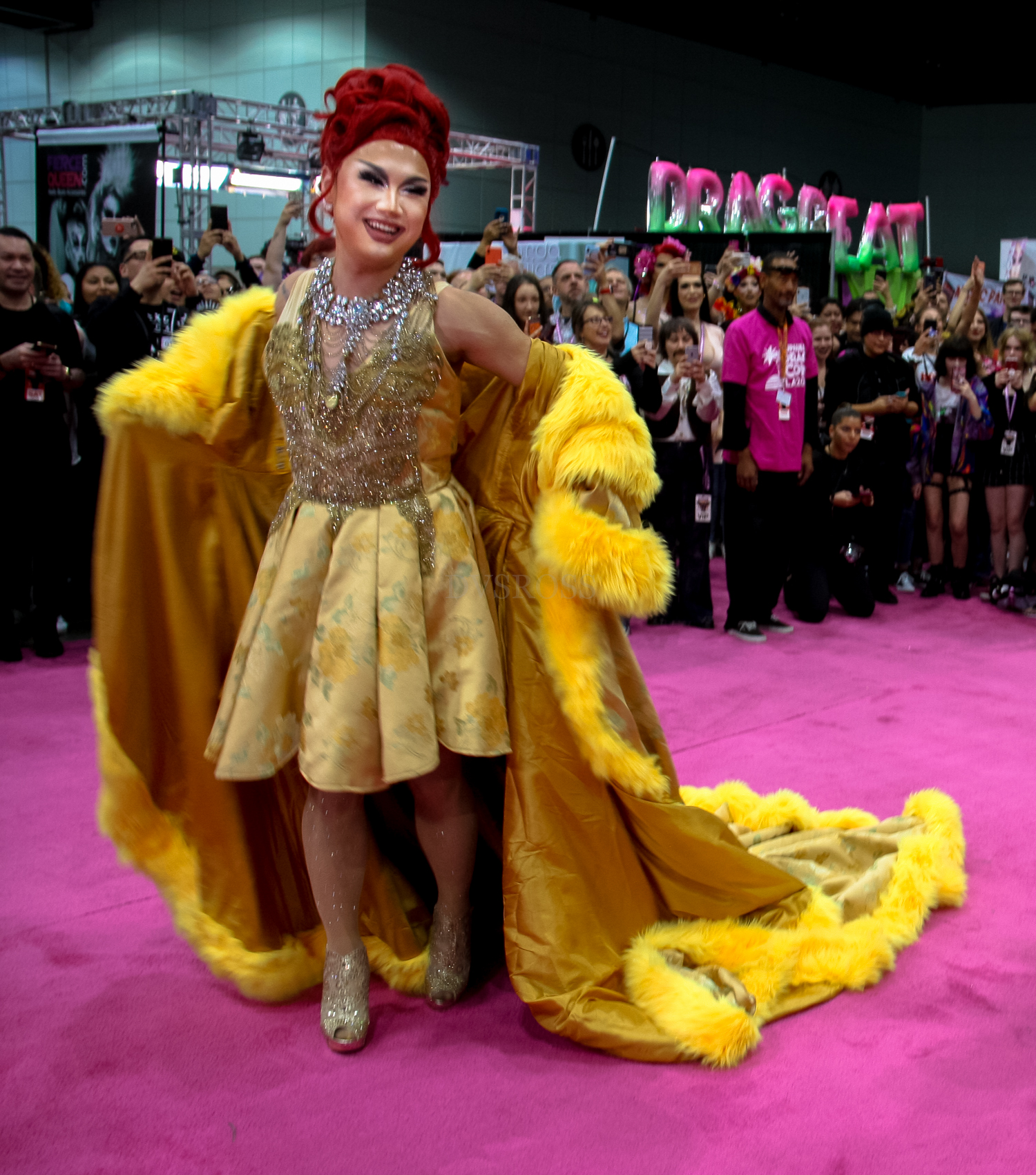
- Soju in 2019
- Born: Hyunsoo Ha (하현수); May 12, 1991 (age 35); Seoul, South Korea
- Other name: Tony Hyunsoo Ha
- Occupations: Drag queen; singer
- Years active: 2016–2021
- Known for: RuPaul's Drag Race

YouTube information
- Channel: Soju
- Genres: Comedy; review; vlog
- Subscribers: 64,800
- Views: 6.3 million

Korean name
- Hangul: 하현수
- RR: Ha Hyeonsu
- MR: Ha Hyŏnsu
- Last updated: April 2020

Soju is the former stage name of Tony Hyunsoo Ha, a South Korean and American retired drag queen, singer and television/YouTube personality. Soju is best known for her online reviews of the reality show RuPaul's Drag Race, until being cast on the show's eleventh season.

== Early life ==
Ha was born on May 12, 1991, in Seoul, South Korea. His family moved to Cedar Rapids, Iowa when he was ten years old, due to his father's military background. He came out as gay when he was 21 and his drag mother is Kahmora Hall. Ha's original drag name was Soju Love, but later shortened to just Soju, which is taken from the drink of the same name.

== Career ==
Outside of drag, Ha is the owner of a taekwondo academy.

Soju was announced as one of fifteen contestants on the eleventh season of RuPaul's Drag Race on January 24, 2019. She was eliminated in the first episode after doing poorly in the sewing challenge and losing a lip sync to "The Best of Both Worlds" by Hannah Montana against Kahanna Montrese. A conversation between Soju and the judges about a cyst became a viral meme within the Drag Race fandom.

After season eleven, YouTuber Miles Jai became the co-host for the third season of Shot with Soju. Comedian Margaret Cho appeared in the first episode of the season in March 2019. In 2019, World of Wonder announced that Soju was set to star in her own webseries, I Want To Be A K-Pop Idol with Soju. The series aired for four episodes before its apparent cancellation in August 2019. Soju is one of the founders and performers of the touring LGBTQ+ K-Pop drag show Seoul Train Party. She appeared in the music video for Lizzo's song "Juice" on April 17, 2019.

=== Music ===
Soju released her first single "So Juicy" with a music video on January 11, 2018. Her second single, "K-Pop Idol Reject" featuring Edward Avila was released on November 6, 2018. In an interview with Billboard, Soju stated, "We want to bring more foreigners, we want to see queer people in K-pop. It's slowly changing - the industry is very conservative and very old school, so it will take a while for them to change. But it's happening."

== Personal life ==
Soju lives in Chicago, as of 2017. On January 21, 2021, Soju was accused of sexual assault. On March 9, 2021, Soju announced that she had quit drag to focus on her mental health and that she wouldn't be returning. In 2022 Soju returned to Instagram.

== Filmography ==
=== Television ===
Year	Title	Role	Notes
2018	How Far Is Tattoo Far?	Herself	
2019	RuPaul's Drag Race	Herself	Contestant (15th place)
2019	RuPaul's Drag Race: Untucked	Herself	

=== Music videos ===
Year	Title	Artist
2018	"So Juicy"	Soju
2018	"K-Pop Idol Reject"	Soju
2019	"Juice"	Lizzo
2020	"Hype"	Yvie Oddly (ft.Vanessa Vanjie Mateo)

=== Web series ===
Year	Title	Role
2016–19	Shot with Soju	Host
2018	Cosmo Queens	Herself
2019	Whatcha Packin'	Herself
2020	Silky's Snack Shack	Herself

== Discography ==
=== Singles ===
Title	Year
"So Juicy"	2018
"K-Pop Idol Reject"	2018
