= Kahanna Montrese =

American drag performer

- Born: Tyrone Hardiman; March 25, 1993 (age 33); Denver, Colorado, U.S.
- Television: RuPaul's Drag Race (season 11)

Kahanna Montrese is the stage name of Tyrone Hardiman (born March 25, 1993), an American drag performer most known for competing on season 11 of RuPaul's Drag Race and RuPaul's Drag Race All Stars.

== Career ==
Kahanna Montrese first performed in drag on March 25, 2011; her 18th birthday. She competed on season 11 of RuPaul's Drag Race. She was eliminated on the second episode ("Good God Girl, Get Out"). She has been described as "Las Vegas's hip-hop showgirl" and someone who "merges street influences with upscale high fashion couture". Her drag "mother" is season 5 contestant Coco Montrese. In 2019, she released a single and music video for "Scores". The video features Manila Luzon, Peppermint, and Trinity the Tuck. Kahanna Montrese and other cast members of RuPaul's Drag Race Live! appeared on the season 14 finale (2022). She also appeared at the 64th Annual Grammy Awards (2022). She competed on the eighth season of RuPaul's Drag Race All Stars (2023) and placed 6th overall.

== Personal life ==
Kahanna Montrese was born in Denver, Colorado, and raised in Panama City, Florida. During her childhood, she frequently participated in gymnastics. She now lives in Las Vegas, Nevada, as of 2019.

== Discography ==
=== Singles ===
==== As lead artist ====
Title	Year	Notes	Ref.
"Scores"	2019	PEG Records	

==== As featured artist ====
Title	Year	Album
"Money, Success, Fame, Glamour" (Glam Rock version) (with the cast of RuPaul's Drag Race All Stars, season 8)	2023	Non-album single
"Joan! The Unauthorized Rusical" (with the cast of RuPaul's Drag Race All Stars, season 8)	2023	Joan! The Unauthorized Rusical Album

== Filmography ==
=== Television ===
Year	Title	Role	Notes	Ref
2019	RuPaul's Drag Race (season 11)	Herself	Contestant (14th place)	
2019	RuPaul's Drag Race: Untucked	Herself	Contestant (14th place)	
2022	RuPaul's Drag Race (season 14)	Herself	Special guest; Episode: "Reunited" & "Grand Finale"	
2023	RuPaul's Drag Race All Stars	Herself	Contestant (6th Place)	
2023	RuPaul's Drag Race All Stars: Untucked	Herself	Contestant (6th Place)	

=== Web series ===
Year	Title	Role	Notes	Ref
2019	Make 7 Decisions by Glamour	Herself	Guest	
2019	Whatcha Packin'	Herself	Guest	
2019	LGBTQuiz	Herself	Guest	
2019	Trailblazer Honors	Herself	Guest; VH1 special	
2019	Makeup Tutorial	Herself	Guest	
2019	Queen to Queen	Herself	Guest with Shuga Cain & Scarlet Envy	
2020	Hey Qween!	Herself	Guest with Coco Montrese	
2020	Supbruh	Herself	Host; 7 episodes	
2023	Meet the Queens	Herself	Stand-alone special RuPaul's Drag Race All Stars 8	
2023	EW News Flash	Herself	Guest	
2023	BuzzFeed Celeb	Herself	Guest	
2023	React to TikTok Trends by Allure	Herself	Guest	

=== Music videos ===
Year	Title	Directed	Notes	Ref
2019	"Scores"	Brad Hammer	Produced by: Producer Entertainment Group & Brad Hammer Productions	
