= Ra'Jah O'Hara =

American drag performer (born 1984)

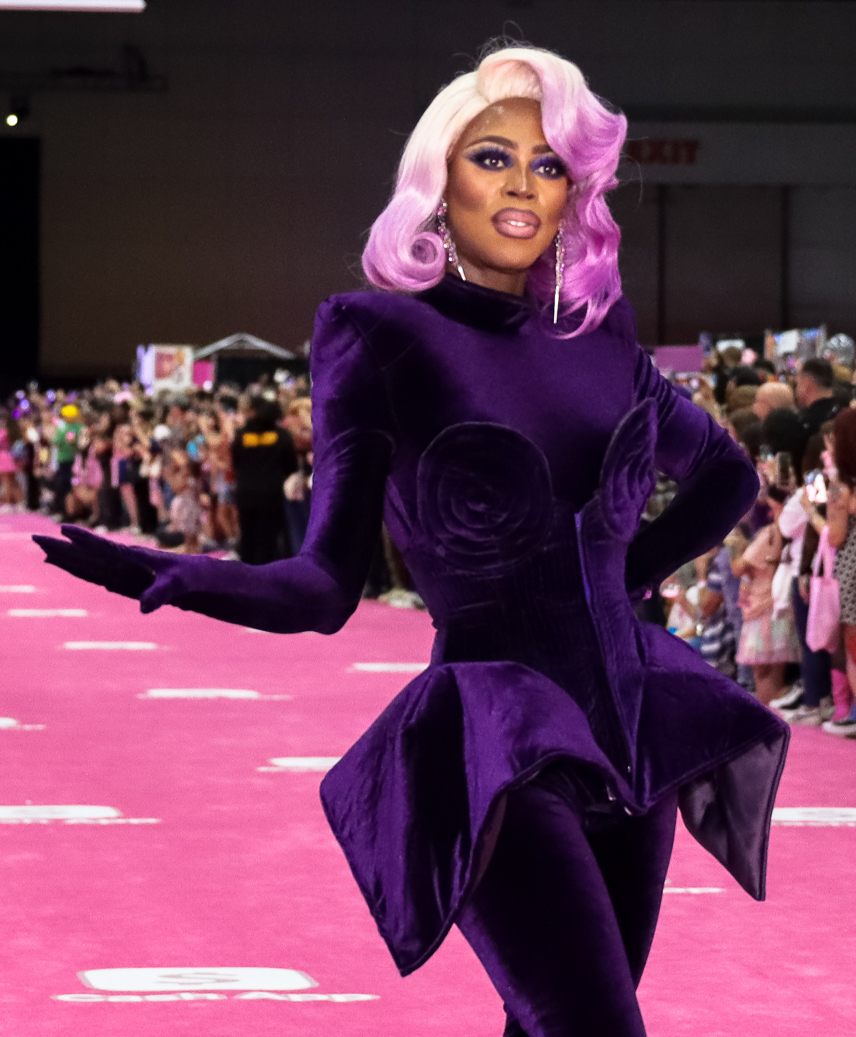
- Ra'Jah O'Hara at RuPaul's DragCon LA, 2023
- Born: Bennie Roy Miller; December 31, 1984 (age 41); Dallas, Texas, U.S.
- Other names: Ra'Jah D. O'Hara; Ra'Jah Davenport O'Hara
- Occupation: Drag queen
- Television: RuPaul's Drag Race (season 11); RuPaul's Drag Race All Stars (season 6); Canada's Drag Race: Canada vs. the World (season 1)

Benni Miller (born Bennie Roy Miller; December 31, 1984), better known by the stage name Ra'Jah O'Hara, is an American drag queen best known for winning the first season of Canada's Drag Race: Canada vs. the World. She previously competed on the eleventh season of RuPaul's Drag Race in 2019 and the sixth season of RuPaul's Drag Race All Stars in 2021.

== Career ==
Ra'Jah O'Hara was announced to be one of fifteen contestants competing on the eleventh season of RuPaul's Drag Race on January 24, 2019. In the third episode, she was involved in the show's first ever six-way lip sync with Honey Davenport, A'keria C. Davenport, Plastique Tiara, Scarlet Envy, and Shuga Cain, which she survived. She later lip-synced again against Mercedes Iman Diamond and Scarlet Envy, sending them both home respectively to James Brown's "Living in America" and Donna Summer's "Last Dance". The following episode, she lip synced again with A'keria C. Davenport to Sheena Easton's "Strut", where she was sent home. Ra'Jah O'Hara competed in pageants prior to Drag Race. She originally was billed as Ra'jah O'Hara Narcisse. Her drag mothers are pageant titleholders Sha'Niah Ellis Narcisse, Silkie O'Hara Munro, and Kelexis Davenport.

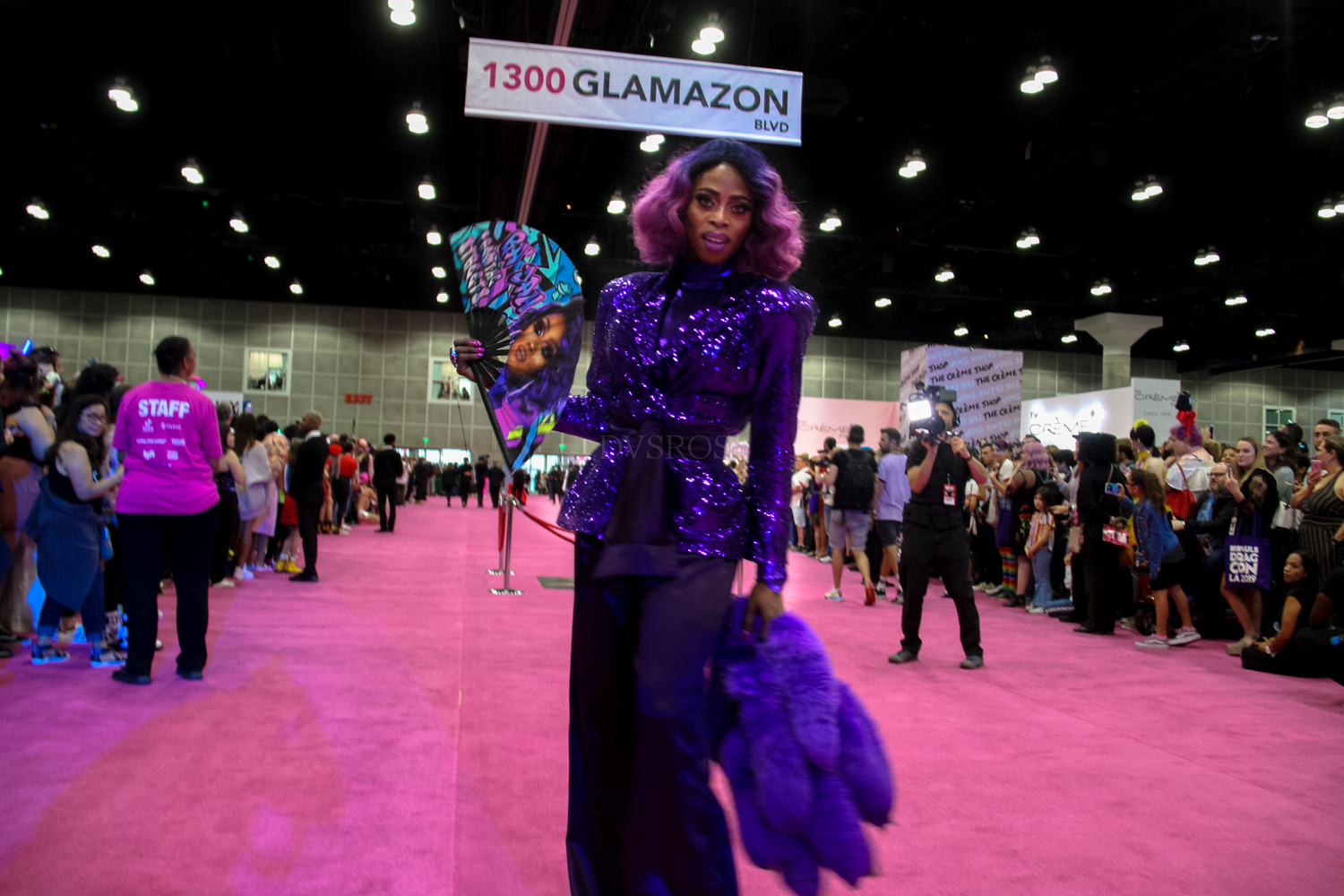
Ra'Jah O'Hara at RuPaul's DragCon LA in 2019

In June 2021, Ra'Jah O'Hara was announced as one of the thirteen contestants competing on the sixth season of RuPaul's Drag Race All Stars. In the second episode of the series, she was declared the winner of the main challenge. She lip-synced to Janet Jackson's "Miss You Much" against Season 11 runner-up and co-host of Canada's Drag Race, Brooke Lynn Hytes. They were both declared winners. Ra'Jah O'Hara sent home fellow contestant Jiggly Caliente in addition to winning $20,000. She also won the main challenge in the ninth episode, but lost the lip sync to Charli XCX's "Boom Clap" against Kameron Michaels. She finished the season as a runner-up with two wins and two bottoms in the sixth and the eleventh episode.

In October 2022, Ra'Jah O'Hara was announced to compete in the premiere season of the international All Stars series based in Canada, Canada's Drag Race: Canada vs. the World. In the second episode, the Snatch Game, she placed in the Top 2 with the winner of the second season of Canada's Drag Race, Icesis Couture, in which she lost the Lip sync to "Sk8er Boi" by Avril Lavigne against her. On December 23, 2022, Ra'Jah O'Hara was declared the winner of the season, beating fellow Season 11 contestant Silky Nutmeg Ganache in a Lip Sync for the Crown to "River Deep – Mountain High" by Celine Dion. She won $100,000 and was crowned the first ever "Queen of the Mother-Pucking World.”

== Education ==
Miller attended the Booker T. Washington High School for the Performing and Visual Arts.

== Personal life ==
Miller was born to Telesia Ann Miller and lives in Dallas, Texas. Miller is a member of the Drag Haus of Davenport, with Drag Race alum Kennedy Davenport, Sahara Davenport, Monet X Change, Honey Davenport and A'keria C. Davenport.

== Filmography ==
=== Television ===
Year	Title	Role	Notes	Ref
2019	RuPaul's Drag Race	Contestant	Season 11, 9 episodes (9th place)	
2019	RuPaul's Drag Race: Untucked	Herself	Season 11, 7 episodes	
2021	Cruel Summer	Minna Plenty	Season 1, 1 episode	
2021	RuPaul's Drag Race All Stars	Contestant	Season 6, 12 episodes (Runner-up)	
2021	RuPaul's Drag Race All Stars: Untucked	Herself	Season 3, 12 episodes	
2022	Canada's Drag Race: Canada vs. the World	Contestant	Season 1, 6 episodes (Winner)	
2023	RuPaul's Drag Race All Stars	Lip Sync Assassin	Season 8; Episode: "The Supermarket Ball"	
2023	RuPaul's Drag Race All Stars: Untucked	Herself	Episode: "Untucked - The Supermarket Ball"	
2023	Canada's Drag Race	Herself	Guest judge (Season 4; Episode 2: "QV-She")	
2024	Canada's Drag Race: Canada vs. the World	Herself	Guest judge (Season 2; Episode 6: "Grand Finale")	

=== Theatre ===
Year	Title	Role	Theatre	Ref(s)
2021	Death Drop	TBA	Various	

=== Web series ===
Year	Title	Role	Notes	Ref
2019	Queen to Queen	Herself	With Honey Davenport and Mercedes Iman Diamond	
2019	Whatcha Packin’	Herself	Guest	
2019	Countdown to the Crown	Herself	Season 11	
2019	Castmates for Cash	Herself	With Silky Nutmeg Ganache	
2021	BINGE	Herself	Podcast; guest	
2021	Whatcha Packin’	Herself	Guest	
2021	Ruvealing the Look	Herself	Guest	
2022	Meet The Queens	Herself	Stand-alone special Canada's Drag Race Vs The World	
2022	EW News Flash	Herself	With Silky Nutmeg Ganache	
2023-24	Bring Back My Girls	Herself	Guest; season 2 (2 episodes)	

=== Music videos ===
Year	Title	Artist	Ref.
2021	"Wig Remix"	Serena ChaCha	
2021	"Do It Like Dolly"	Kylie Sonique Love	
2023	"True Colors"	Kylie Sonique Love	

== Discography ==
=== As featured artist ===
Title	Year	Album
"Show Up Queen" (with the Cast of RuPaul's Drag Race All Stars, Season 6)	2021	Non-album single
"This Is Our Country" (RuPaul and Tanya Tucker featuring The Cast of RuPaul's Drag Race All Stars, Season 6)	2021	Non-album single
"Bonjour, Hi" (SRV Version) (The cast of Canada's Drag Race: Canada Vs the World)	2022	Non-album single
