= Silky Nutmeg Ganache =

American drag performer (born 1990)

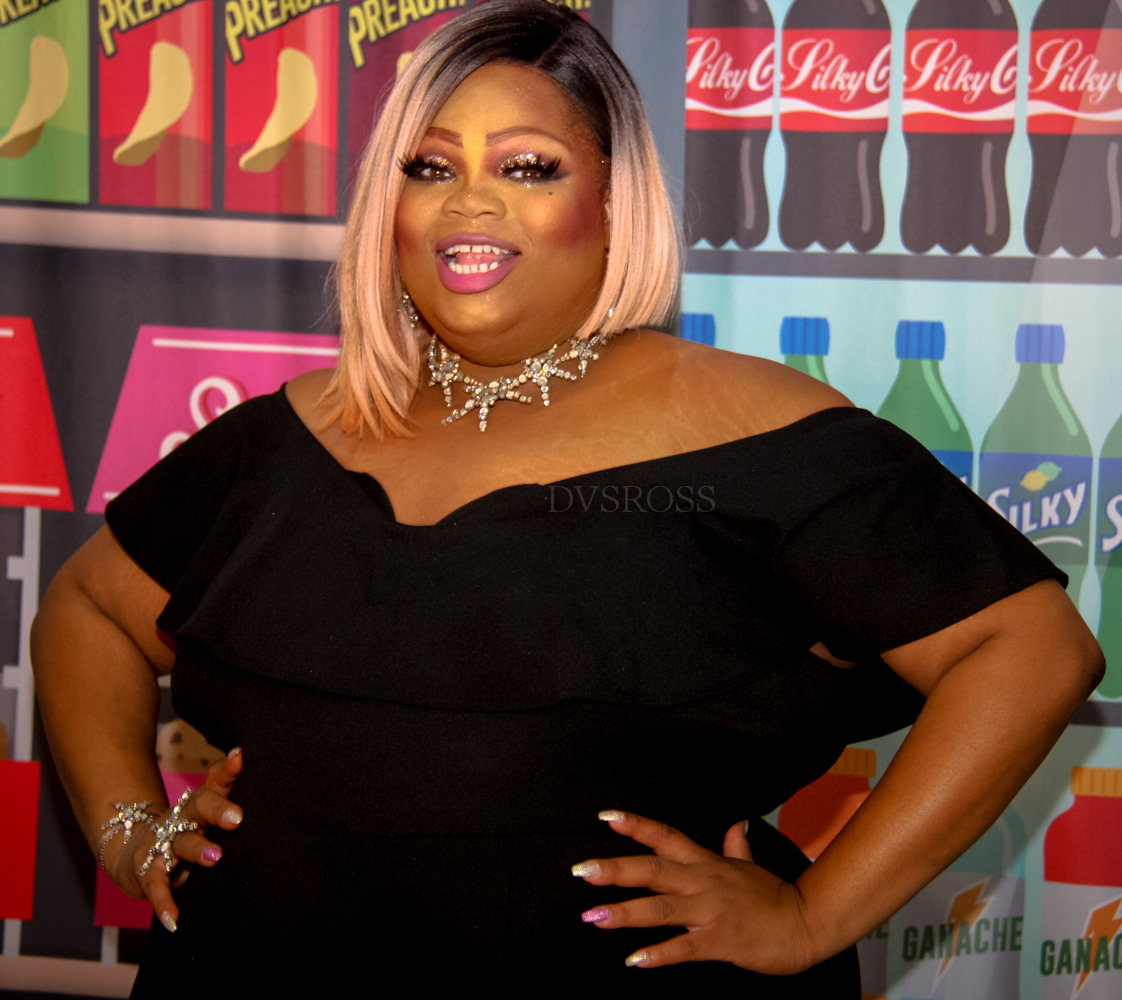
- Silky Nutmeg Ganache at RuPaul's DragCon LA in 2019
- Born: Reginald Homer Steele; December 31, 1990 (age 35); Moss Point, Mississippi, U.S.
- Education: Wabash College (BA); Indiana Wesleyan University (MBA)
- Occupation: Drag queen
- Years active: 2012-present
- Television: RuPaul's Drag Race (season 11); RuPaul's Drag Race All Stars (season 6); Canada's Drag Race: Canada vs. the World (season 1)
- Website: silkyganache.com

Silky Nutmeg Ganache (born December 31, 1990) is an American drag performer most known for competing on the eleventh season (2019) of RuPaul's Drag Race and on the sixth (2021) and eleventh (2026) seasons of RuPaul's Drag Race All Stars. She has also been involved in numerous Drag Race spin-offs, including RuPaul's Drag Race: Vegas Revue (2020) and RuPaul's Secret Celebrity Drag Race (2022). She also competed in the first Canadian-based international All Stars spin-off series, Canada's Drag Race: Canada vs. the World in 2022, finishing as the runner-up.

== Early life and education ==
Silky Nutmeg Ganache was born on December 31, 1990 as Reginald Homer Steele, into an African American Pentecostal family in Moss Point, Mississippi, but eventually moved to Chicago as a young adult. Growing up, she was an avid fan of the Food Network, and most frequently watched Emeril Lagasse’s programs. She is a Hurricane Katrina survivor, and, as a result of the flooding sustained during the natural disaster, only a few visual records of her childhood exist. She came out to her family as gay when she was in her senior year of high school. She earned her MBA in organizational leadership from Indiana Wesleyan University in December 2017. According to Silky Nutmeg Ganache's website, she is currently pursuing her PhD. Because of her Master's and PhD pursuit, she is often jokingly referred to as "The Reverend Dr. Silky Nutmeg Ganache".

She went to Wabash College, an all-male college, where she came out as gay to her college community during her junior year of college, and she thought of her original drag name, "Lasagna Frozeen", which was considered alongside the name "Honeybutta Biscuit Superbottom". (Note: Spelling indefinite; may be spelled "Honeybutter", or may contain a space ("Honey Butter"). Ganache noted that her introduction with this name would include the phrase "from the House of Superbottom", although it is unknown if this house ever existed.) The name "Lasagna Frozeen" originated from when Silky Nutmeg Ganache drank too much at parties and her peers gave her the nickname "Lasagna", quipping that "Lasagna was coming out" whenever she had drunk too much alcohol. She had first discovered drag during her senior year of college, when, over spring break, she attended a drag show at nearby DePauw University. Her drag mother and mentor, Vanessa Ryan, later dubbed her "Silky" because she could be rough around the edges but also classy. One night, Silky went home where she watched the Food Network, and, while watching a program, she overheard the phrase "silky ganache." She added “nutmeg”, a nickname she had gained while working in food services to the name, and, from there, she would hence be known as "Silky Nutmeg Ganache". She considers the anniversary of her first time performing in drag to be March 18, 2012. Silky Nutmeg Ganache graduated from Wabash College the same year.

== Career ==
Silky Nutmeg Ganache has participated in many pageants, and has over 100 competition credits. Her pageant history includes Miss Gay Indiana University 2014 (winner), Indiana All American Goddess at Large 2014 (first alternate), Miss Unlimited Newcomer 2015 (winner), Miss Latina Continental Plus 2017 (winner), Miss Continental Plus 2017 (second alternate), and Miss Illinois Continental Plus 2018 (first alternate), Miss Supreme Continental Plus 2023, Miss Continental Plus 2023 (first alternate) . Prior to her time on RuPaul's Drag Race, she performed drag for six years, working at Hydrate, Roscoe's, Splash and Berlin in Boystown. She drank vodka the day she received the call to appear on Drag Race, ending a six-month abstention from alcohol.

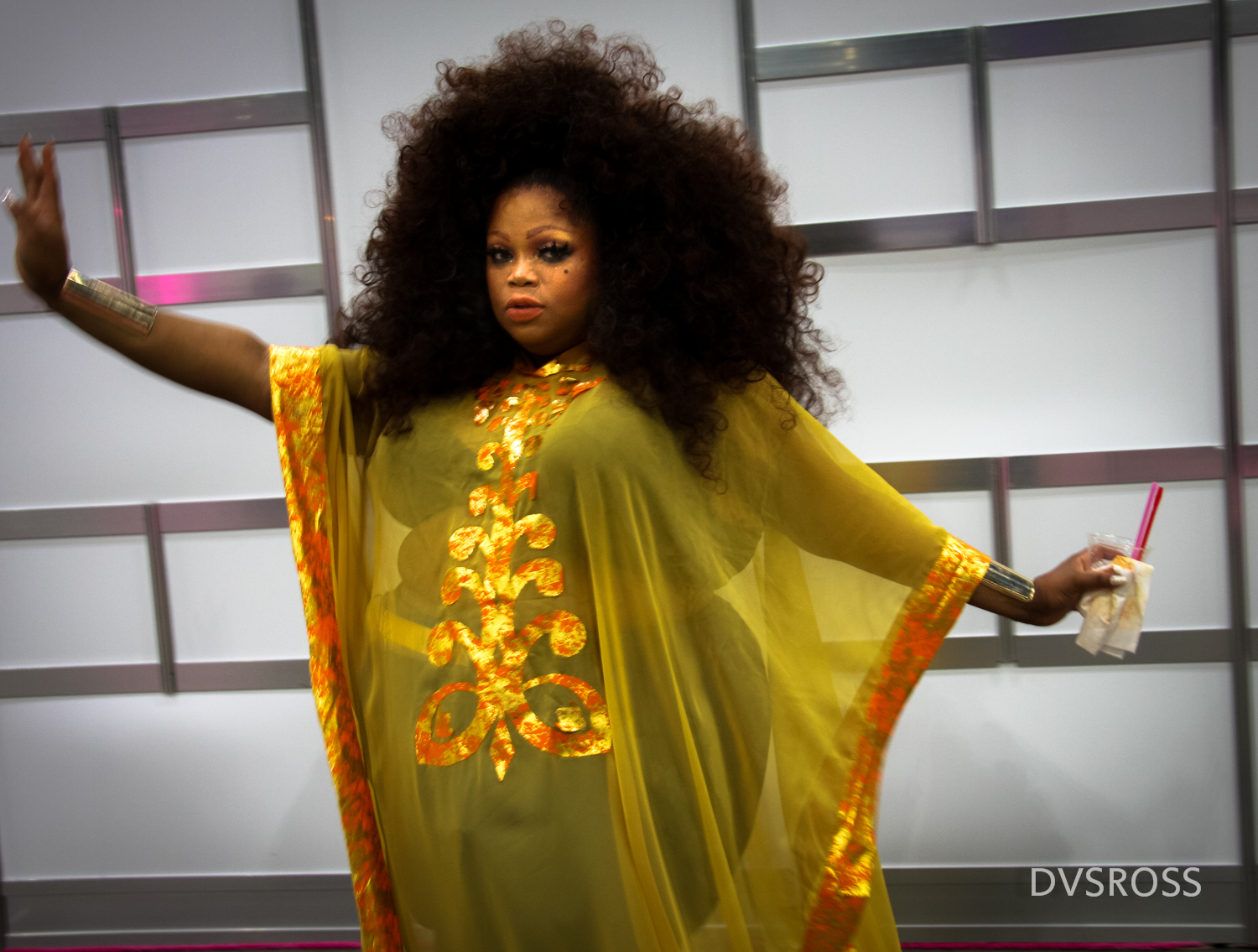
Silky Nutmeg Ganache in 2019

Silky Nutmeg Ganache was announced to be one of fifteen contestants competing on season eleven of RuPaul's Drag Race on January 24, 2019. She won two main challenges, in episode four and eight. She portrayed Oprah Winfrey for her winning performance in Trump: The Rusical. Ts Madison, whom Silky Nutmeg Ganache portrayed in the season's Snatch Game challenge, praised Silky Nutmeg Ganache for her performance. In episode 11, Silky Nutmeg Ganache landed in the bottom two, where she sent home Nina West to TLC's "No Scrubs". In the season finale, held in Los Angeles’ Orpheum Theatre, Silky Nutmeg Ganache was a part of the final four, and lip-synced against Brooke Lynn Hytes to Destiny's Child's "Bootylicious", which she lost, finishing the competition in 3rd/4th place alongside A'keria Chanel Davenport. On July 24, 2019, Silky Nutmeg Ganache performed alongside Iggy Azalea at the Bowery Ballroom in New York City. Silky Nutmeg Ganache guest starred in Germany's Next Topmodel, alongside fellow RuPaul's Drag Race alum Derrick Barry and Vanessa Vanjie Mateo. She appeared in a music video for Lizzo's song "Juice" on April 17, 2019.

From March 26 to September 6, she was a part of the rotating cast for RuPaul's Drag Race: Season 11 Tour, presented by Voss Events and World of Wonder, and hosted by Asia O'Hara. The show kicked off in Los Angeles on May 26 during the RuPaul's DragCon LA wrap party (hosted by Drag Race judge Michelle Visage) and concluded with a final bow on September 6 in New York City (also hosted by Visage) at the top of RuPaul’s DragCon NYC. In April 2020, amid the coronavirus pandemic, Silky Nutmeg Ganache was announced as a featured cast member for the very first Digital Drag Fest, an online drag festival for all ages, with attendees given opportunities to interact with the artists, tip them, and win prizes during the broadcast. In 2020, she was featured in Magnus Hastings' Rainbow Revolution photography book.

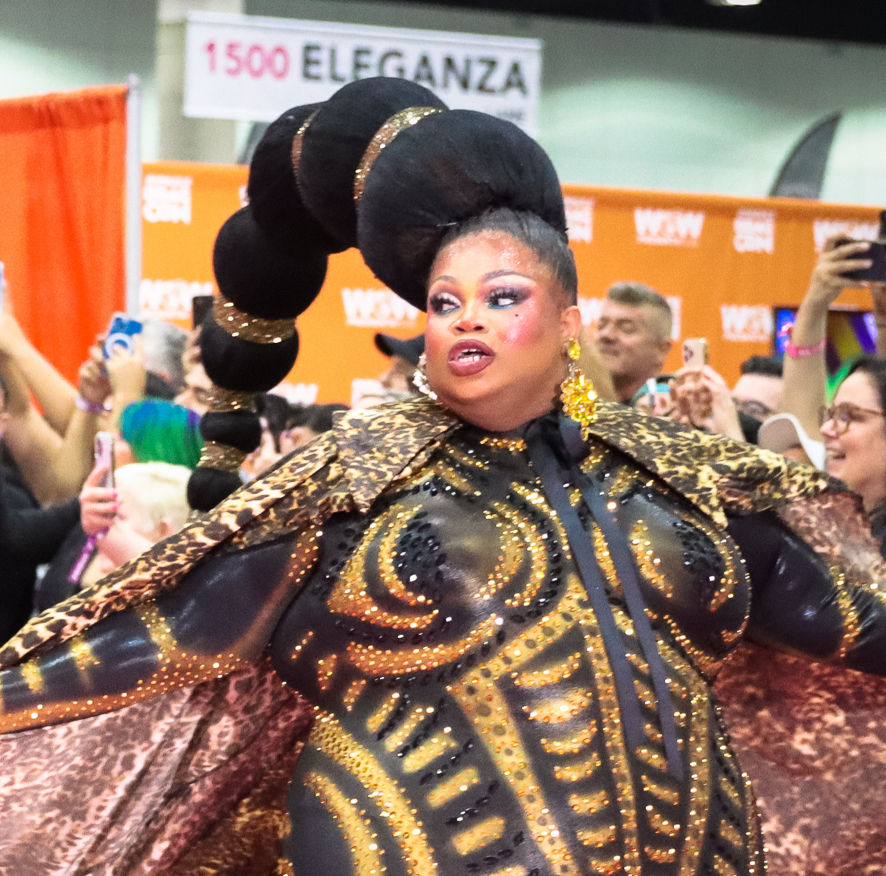
Silky Nutmeg Ganache in 2023

Silky Nutmeg Ganache starred in her own series on WOWPresents Plus series entitled Shantay You Pray, a series exploring her relationship with religion, which aired four episodes in October 2020. She is also set to star in Nightmare Neighbors with Silky & Vanjie, another WOWPresents series with Vanessa Vanjie Mateo, a docuseries chronicling their life together as they move into the same apartment. As of July 2023, this series is yet to be released.

Silky was announced to be one of thirteen contestants competing on the sixth season of RuPaul's Drag Race All Stars on May 26, 2021. She was eliminated in the third episode, placing 11th overall. Soon after her elimination, she released Cocktails for a Queen, an alcoholic beverage recipe book inspired by Drag Race alum. She returned in the tenth episode as a part of the "Game Within a Game" twist, making "herstory" as the queen with most lip-syncs in a single episode, with seven, and the most lip-sync wins in a single episode with six.

Silky was announced to be one of the nine contestants competing on the first season of Canada's Drag Race: Canada vs. the World on October 17, 2022. Silky won 2 maxi challenges and placed in the bottom once, where Rita Baga sent home Vanity Milan (in place of Silky Nutmeg Ganache) after winning the lip-sync against Victoria Scone to ”Freak” by Estelle featuring Kardinal Offishall. Silky eventually placed runner up in the season after losing the lip-sync for the crown of Celine Dion’s cover of “River Deep – Mountain High” to Ra'Jah O'Hara.

In 2024, she was announced as one of eight former Drag Race contestants participating in Painting with Raven, a spin-off of the WOW Presents Plus series Painted with Raven.

In April 2026, Silky was confirmed to be competing on the eleventh season of RuPaul's Drag Race All Stars in the second bracket. Her season 11 and All Stars season 6 castmate A'keria C. Davenport and season 11 castmate Shuga Cain are also competing on the season.

== Personal life ==
Ganache is a registered Republican, although she does not hold conservative political views. In the Drag Race episode "Trump: The Rusical", she explained that this is because of party gerrymandering and "gentrification and movement of the districts", and stated that despite her official party affiliation, she does not vote for Republican politicians. She says "It's very important that people realize that if you want to stop that within the political process, get smarter than them. Register as a Republican, and they'll have to redo everything."

After her run on Drag Race, Silky Nutmeg Ganache later revealed that due to the online hate and abuse she received, she fell into a depression and nearly quit drag.

== Filmography ==
=== Television ===
Year	Title	Role	Notes	Ref
2019	RuPaul's Drag Race	Contestant	3rd/4th place; Season 11 (14 episodes)	
2019	RuPaul's Drag Race: Untucked	Herself	Season 10 (12 episodes)	
2019	Germany's Next Topmodel	Herself	Guest; Season 14, episode 13	
2020	RuPaul's Drag Race: Vegas Revue	Herself	Guest	
2021, 2023	RuPaul's Drag Race All Stars	Contestant	11th place; Season 6 (4 episodes); Lip Sync Assassin; Season 8 (1 episode)	
2021, 2023	RuPaul's Drag Race All Stars: Untucked	Herself	Season 3 (4 episodes); Season 5 (1 episode)	
2022	RuPaul's Secret Celebrity Drag Race	Herself	Guest; Season 2, episode 4	
2022	Canada's Drag Race: Canada vs. the World	Contestant	Runner-up; Season 1, 6 episodes	
2023	RuPaul's Drag Race UK	Herself	Special guest; Episode: "Tickety-Boo"	
2025	Drag House Rules	Herself	Main cast; 6 episodes	
2025	Slaycation	Herself	Main cast; Season 2, 6 episodes	

- RuPaul's Drag Race All Stars (season 11)

=== Web series ===
Year	Title	Role	Notes	Ref
2019	Queen to Queen	Herself	With Vanessa Mateo and A'keria Chanel Davenport	
2019	Meet the Queens	Herself	Stand-alone special RuPaul's Drag Race Season 11	
2019	Whatcha Packin'	Herself	Guest	
2019	Countdown to the Crown	Herself	Season 11	
2019	Cosmo Queens	Herself	Cosmopolitan Series	
2019	Remember That Time	Herself	Guest	
2019	Be$ties for Ca$h	Herself	With Vanessa Vanjie Mateo	
2020	Elevate Your Slay	Herself	Guest	
2020	Silky's Snack Shack	Herself	Host	
2020	Shantay You Pray	Herself	Host	
2020	Hey Qween	Herself	Guest	
2021	Meet the Queens	Herself	Stand-alone special RuPaul's Drag Race: All Stars 6	
2021	Whatcha Packin'	Herself	Guest	
2021	Ruvealing the Look	Herself	Guest	
2021	Trixie Cosmetics TV	Herself	Guest; Episode: "Kiki with Silky Nutmeg Ganache"	
2022	The Pit Stop	Herself	Guest	
2022	Binge Queens	Herself	RuPaul's Drag Race: UK series 4	
2022	Meet the Queens	Herself	Stand-alone special Canada's Drag Race: Canada vs The World	
2022	EW News Flash	Herself	Guest with Ra'Jah O'Hara	
2023	Give It To Me Straight	Herself	Guest	
2023	Kerri Kares	Herself	Special guest; Episodes: "Fabulosity - Part One" & "Fabulosity - Part Two"	
2023	Unpacked with Jan Sport	Herself	Guest; Podcast	
2024	House of Laughs	Herself	WOWPresents Plus original	

=== Music videos ===
Year	Title	Artist	Ref.
2019	"Juice"	Lizzo	
2020	"Hype"	Yvie Oddly	
2021	"Wig Remix"	Serena ChaCha	
2021	"Silky"	Cuee	

== Discography ==
=== Featured singles ===
Title	Year	Album
"Queens Everywhere" (RuPaul featuring A'keria Chanel Davenport, Brooke Lynn Hytes, Silky Nutmeg Ganache, Vanessa Mateo, & Yvie Oddly)	2019	Non-album singles
"Bonjour, Hi!" (SRV Version) (The cast of Canada's Drag Race: Canada vs the World)	2022	Non-album singles

== Awards and nominations ==
Year	Award ceremony	Category	Work	Results	Ref.
2020	The Queerties	Future All-Star	Herself	Nominated	
