= Ariel Versace =

American drag queen

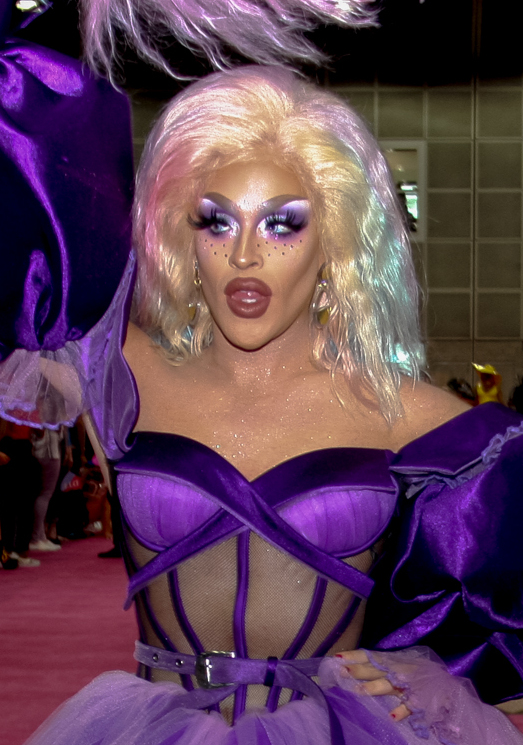
- Ariel Versace at RuPaul's DragCon LA 2019
- Born: Bryan Philip Neel; April 13, 1992 (age 34); Cherry Hill, New Jersey, U.S.
- Occupation: Drag queen
- Television: RuPaul's Drag Race (season 11)

Ariel Versace (born April 13, 1992) is the stage name of Bryan Philip Neel, an American drag queen and wig designer, most known for competing on season 11 of the television series RuPaul's Drag Race. The self-described "bratz doll" was born in New Jersey and goes by the name Bryan Philip on OnlyFans.

== Career ==
Bryan Neel was born to Susan Neel and started performing in drag in 2013. The name Ariel Versace comes from the main character of "The Little Mermaid" and the fashion brand. In 2015, she worked as a makeup artist for the indie movie Deadly Gamble.

She was announced as one of fifteen queens cast on RuPaul's Drag Race in 2019. She was eliminated in the monster ball challenge in episode five due to infamously slipping and falling in the lip sync for your life. Shortly after the season ended, she released her first single, "Venomous" on June 4, 2019.

She owns a wig business called Drag by Chariel with her partner Chastity St. Cartier.

== Filmography ==
=== Television ===
Year	Title	Role	Notes
2019	RuPaul's Drag Race	Herself	Contestant (11th Place)
2019	RuPaul's Drag Race: Untucked	Herself	Companion show to RuPaul's Drag Race

=== Web series ===
Year	Title	Role	Notes	Ref.
2018	Cosmo Drag Queens	Herself	Guest	
2019	Whatcha Packin’	Herself	Guest	
2019	Hey Qween!	Herself	Guest	
2019	Queen to Queen	Herself	Guest	
2020	Besties for Cash	Herself	Guest	

== Discography ==
=== As lead artist ===
Title	Year	Ref.
"Venomous"	2019	
"Coin" (Ft. Soju)	2019	
"Joystick"	2020	
