= Scarlet Envy =

American drag performer (born 1992)

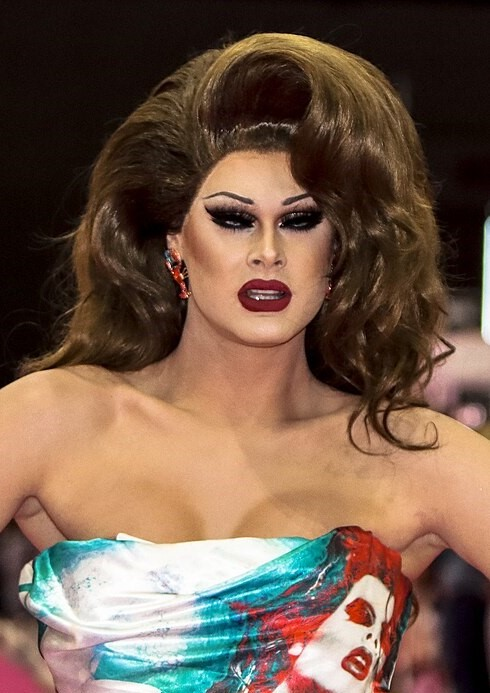
- Scarlet Envy at RuPaul's DragCon LA in 2022
- Born: Jacob James Grady; February 26, 1992 (age 34); Louisville, Kentucky, U.S
- Education: Fashion Institute of Technology (BFA)
- Occupation: Drag queen
- Known for: RuPaul's Drag Race (season 11); RuPaul's Drag Race All Stars (season 6); RuPaul's Drag Race: UK vs. the World (series 2)
- Website: scarletenvyshop.com

Scarlet Envy (born February 26, 1992), is the stage name of Jacob James Grady, an American drag queen, reality television personality, singer, and performer who is best known for competing on the eleventh season of RuPaul's Drag Race (2019), the sixth season of its spin-off, RuPaul's Drag Race All Stars (2021), and the second series of RuPaul's Drag Race: UK vs. the World (2024).

== Early life ==
Grady was raised in Louisville, Kentucky, by conservative parents for most of her youth with her three younger sisters. Her parents divorced sometime during her adolescence leading to her mother Sherri finding a new partner in Scarlet's step-mother also named Sherri. During childhood, she ran cross country for twelve years.

During high-school, Scarlet Envy chose to go to conversion therapy for two years due to religious reasons. This is partly why she holds a “complicated relationship” with Kentucky. Scarlet moved to New York, and went back to Kentucky later.

She attended Fashion Institute of Technology (FIT), and In 2014 she graduated with a degree in advertising design. While attending college, she hosted ‘Scarlet Fever’ in Brooklyn, NY. During this time, she both hosted and attended NYC parties. She was active in drag culture, and the NYC nightlife scene.

== Career ==
Scarlet Envy first started drag in college, choosing her name from the lead character of the film Gone with the Wind, Scarlett O'Hara. She entered a drag pageant, where she learned that she didn't have the typical drag skills of dancing and pageantry. This experience, and having drag queen friends, ignited her drag career. She has credited her successful career to persistence, energy, and acceptance.

Scarlet's first was at a hole in the wall bar called This-N-That bar (TNT) which closed down in 2016. She gives a lot of credit to TNT for allowing her to lift up other up and coming Drag queens. However, her first proper show ran for over two years in a different now closed bar called LoveGun.

Scarlet Envy is considered to be the "drag daughter" of Drag Race season 7 finalist Pearl.

After auditioning four times, Scarlet Envy was cast on the eleventh season of Drag Race in 2018. She won the second episode's challenge along with Yvie Oddly. She participated in a six-way lip sync on the third episode, won the mini-challenge in the fourth episode, and was eliminated on the sixth episode, after placing in the bottom two and losing a lip-sync to Ra'Jah O'Hara. Scarlet Envy returned for the sixth season of RuPaul's Drag Race: All Stars, which aired in 2021. She placed safe in the first four episodes and was eliminated in the fifth by Ginger Minj, placing ninth overall. In 2024, she released a music video of her single "All Night", with appearances of other famous drag queens such as Raja Gemini, Manila Luzon and Kylie Sonique Love. She also released her first poetry book titled "She's a Poet", talking about love, show business and identity. Also in 2024, Scarlet appeared in the second season of UK vs. the World, where she placed 5th, ultimately being sent home by Australian drag queen, Hannah Conda. During her run on DRUK vs the World, Scarlet won the acting challenge and placed high in the Snatch Game the following week. She was applauded for her “glow up” and elevated runways, being heavily supported by the fan base.

Scarlet Envy played the title role of Yma Sumac in a production of The Legend of Yma Sumac at The Laurie Beechman Theatre, New York City. She was also featured on a season finale of Saturday Night Live as a dancer during Katy Perry's performance of "Swish Swish", alongside fellow Drag Race contestants Brita Filter, Vivacious, and Yuhua Hamasaki. She made a special guest appearance in the second season of iCarly, in the episode "iDragged Him" as Lana Del Slay.

When filming promo material for RuPaul's Drag Race Season 14, Allstars 6, Scarlet Envy said the now iconic line, “Is is it me? Am I the drama? I don’t think so…Maybe I am?”. This was in response to the entire cast being asked “who is the villain of the season?”, and her energetic answer became an audio clip used by thousands of videos across social media platforms and by celebrities such as Lady Gaga. It also has over 1.5 million views on the RuPaul's Drag Race TikTok account.

After her third season on UK vs. the World 2, Scarlett embarked on a 36-city US tour called the “Bad Advice Tour”. Her first show was on August 17, 2024, and her last on March 9th, 2025. This was a 90-minute live show that included cabaret, poetry, music, and Drag Race drama. The setlist of the show included cabaret covers of her hits “All Night,” “Am I The Drama,” “Bad Advice,” and “The Feeling Is Mutual,” as well as songs from her newest album “Rain In Hollywood.” The Bad Advice show was nominated for Best Show, Best Solo Debut, and Best Musical Comedy at the BroadwayWorld 2024 Cabaret Awards.

== Personal life ==
She began playing with makeup around the age of ten, but often got in trouble for doing so because of her religious upbringing. She would apply eyeliner in secret then wipe it off, lying anytime someone noticed residue on her face.

During her transition from Kentucky to her dorm in New York, she decided it was time to come out to her mother as gay. While Scarlet's mother was in New York helping her move, she sat her down in a Starbucks and came out. Her mother wasn't surprised to find this out.

Grady lived in New York City from 2010 to 2022, before moving to Los Angeles in November 2022. She initially lived with both her mother and father. Scarlet's mother separated from and divorced her deacon father. However, Scarlet's mother later remarried to Sheri.

She believes that being in drag is a calming experience, and that she is lucky to be able to be Scarlet for an hour much less 16 hours at a time. She finds joy in the fantasy aspect; giving herself and others a brief transforming escape.

== Activism and volunteer work ==
Scarlet Envy is publicly against conversion therapy after her experiences with it. She supports organizations like Human Rights Campaign who speak out about the harm conversion therapy can cause.

In January 2021, Scarlet Envy worked with Teen Cancer America, and led a virtual makeup tutorial with 15 young cancer patients. The tutorial initially was to be held in-person, but due to COVID-19 it was moved virtually to Zoom. She proceeded to hold multiple similar events for the same cause in 2025 and 2026.

In March 2023, Scarlet partnered with a Lexington advertising business, Cornett, in a campaign to show their support for drag in the office and the community amidst push for anti-drag legislation in Kentucky.

In 2024, Scarlet Envy participated in the third annual Pride in Times Square, and performed “Celebrate You!” with other participants of RuPaul's Drag Race, and a TikTok influencer Gioconda. The "Celebrate You!" performance was sponsored by ViiV Healthcare, a British pharmaceutical company that focuses on treating HIV.

== Discography ==
Singles

Title	Year
"Feeling Is Mutual"	2019
"Press On"	2020
"Is It Me?"	2021
"Dragon"	2024
"All Night"	2024

== Filmography ==
=== Film ===
Year	Title	Role	Notes	Ref.
2022	Only Worn Once	Herself	Short film	

=== Television ===
Year	Title	Role	Notes	Ref.
2017	Saturday Night Live	Herself	Episode: "Dwayne Johnson/Katy Perry"	
2019	RuPaul's Drag Race (season 11)	Herself	Season 11 (10th Place)	
2020	Hey Qween!	Herself		
2021	RuPaul's Drag Race All Stars (season 6)	Herself	Contestant (9th Place)	
2021	RuPaul's Drag Race All Stars: Untucked	Herself	Contestant (9th Place)	
2022	ICarly	Lana Del Slay	Episode: "iDragged Him"	
2023	The Weakest Link	Herself	Contestant	
2023	Watch What Happens Live with Andy Cohen	Herself	Guest	
2024	RuPaul's Drag Race: UK vs. the World (series 2)	Herself	Contestant (5th Place)	

=== Web series ===
Year	Title	Role	Notes	Ref.
2019	Untucked	Herself	Companion web series to RuPaul's Drag Race	
2019, 2022	Fashion Photo RuView	Herself	Produced by World of Wonder	
2020	Envy of My Boogie	Herself	Produced by World of Wonder	
2020	Out of the Closet	Herself	Produced by World of Wonder	
2021	Whatcha Packin'	Herself	Companion web series to RuPaul's Drag Race	
2021	Ruvealing the Look	Herself	Companion web series to RuPaul's Drag Race	
2021	Drag Us Weekly	Herself	Produced by Us Weekly	
2022	Binge Queens	Herself	Guest, Produced by World of Wonder	
2023	The Pit Stop	Herself	Guest	
2023	Bring Back My Girls	Herself	Guest, All Stars 6 Reunion Episode	
2024	Bring Back My Girls	Herself	Guest, Upcoming UK vs. The World Season 2 Episode	

=== Theatre ===
Year	Title	Role	Theatre	Ref.
2017	The Legend of Yma Sumac	Yma Sumac	Laurie Beechman Theatre	

=== Tours ===
Year	Title	Role	Notes	Ref.
2024–2025	The Bdd Advice Tour	Herself	Broadway World Award Nominated	
