= Shuga Cain =

American drag performer (born 1977)

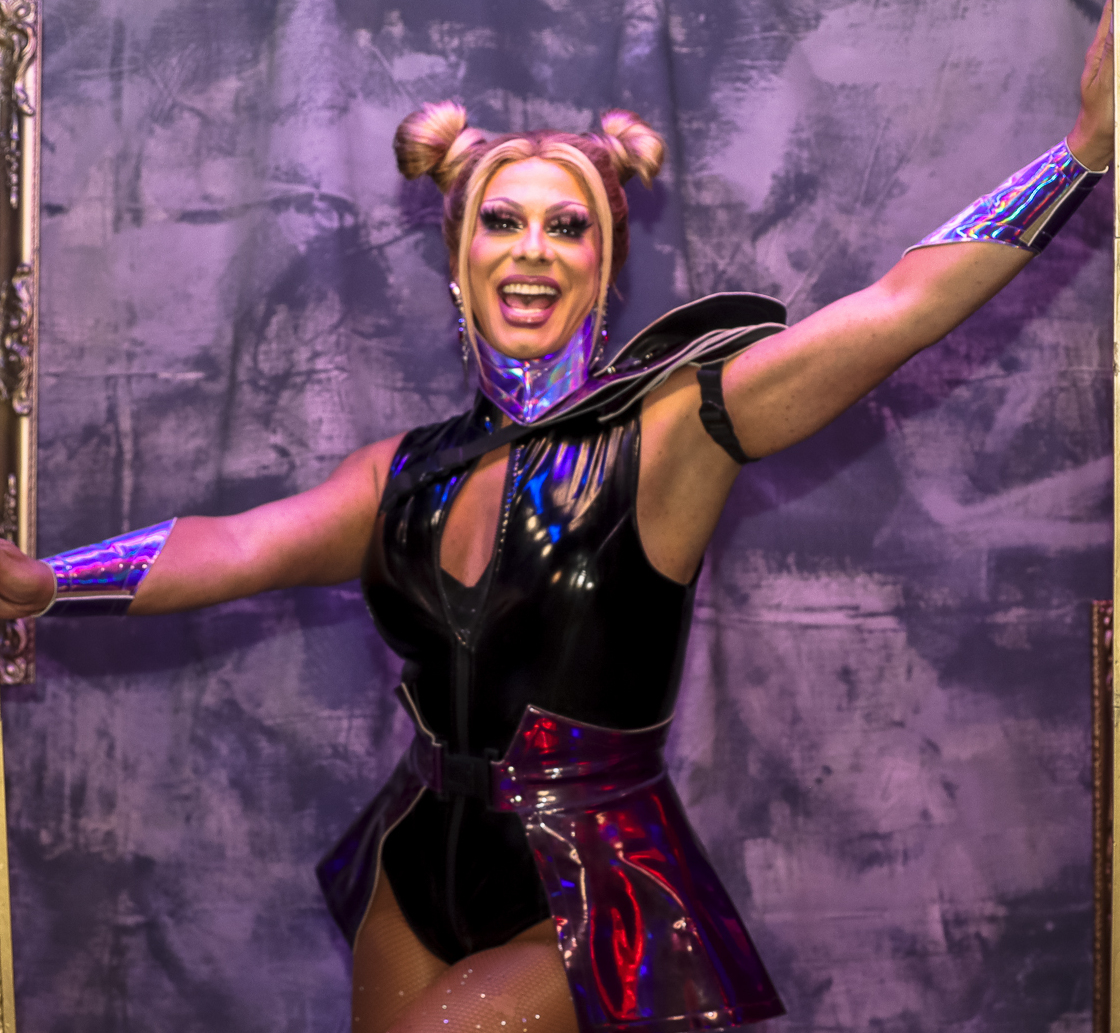
- Shuga Cain at RuPaul’s DragCon, 2022
- Born: Jesus Martinez Jr. November 20, 1977 (age 49); Oakland, California, U.S
- Occupation: Drag queen
- Known for: RuPaul's Drag Race (season 11)
- Spouse: Tim Carswell (m. 2025)
- Website: shugssweetshop.com

Shuga Cain is the stage name of Jesus Martinez Jr. (born November 20, 1977), an American drag queen who came to international attention on the eleventh season of RuPaul's Drag Race. She later competed on the eleventh season of RuPaul's Drag Race All Stars.

== Early life ==
Martinez was born in Oakland, California and as a child moved to Northern California, where he grew up in a predominantly white neighborhood. His father was Salvadoran, and his mother was Apache with Spanish ancestry.

== Career ==
In 2011, Martinez starred in a production of Xanadu, portraying Sonny Malone. He started drag full time in 2017, quitting a corporate job with the Scholastic Corporation to pursue it.

In March 2018, Shuga Cain was a part of Max Emerson's Drag Babies series, hosted by Bob the Drag Queen. She was a Drag Mentor, alongside Peppermint and Chi Chi DeVayne.

Shuga Cain was announced to be one of fifteen contestants competing on season eleven of RuPaul's Drag Race on January 24, 2019. She was the fourth Native American Drag Race contestant, following Stacy Layne Matthews in season 4, who is Lumbee, Kelly Mantle in season 6, who is Cherokee, and Trixie Mattel in season 7 and All Stars 3, who is Ojibwe. In episode 3, she was a part of the historic six-way lip-sync (the first time in the show history in which more than two contestants had to lip-sync to avoid elimination), which she survived. Shuga Cain lipsynced once again in episode 5, where she sent home Ariel Versace to Whitney Houston's "I'm Your Baby Tonight". Despite never winning a challenge, Shuga Cain placed in the top during the season's Snatch Game challenge, where she portrayed Charo. She was eliminated in the tenth episode after lip-syncing to "No More Drama" (2001) by Mary J. Blige against Vanessa Vanjie Mateo. Shuga Cain finished the competition in seventh place. During her time on the show, she released Shuga in the Raw, where she recapped every episode of season 11.

From March 26 to September 6, she was a part of the rotating cast for RuPaul's Drag Race: Season 11 Tour, presented by Voss Events and World of Wonder, and hosted by Asia O'Hara. The show kicked off in Los Angeles on May 26 during the RuPaul's DragCon LA wrap party (hosted by Drag Race judge Michelle Visage) and concluded with a final bow on September 6 in New York City (also hosted by Visage) at the top of RuPaul's DragCon NYC.

Shuga Cain was announced to host Gimme Some Shuga, a six episode mini-series on WOWPresents Plus. The series focuses on Cain and baker Justin Salinas creating cakes inspired by RuPaul's Drag Race legends. She was announced as part of the cast for A Drag Queen Christmas, a Christmas-theme drag show hosted by Nina West.

In April 2026, Cain was announced to be competing on the eleventh season of RuPaul's Drag Race All Stars in the third bracket. Her season 11 castmates A'keria C. Davenport and Silky Nutmeg Ganache are also competing on the season.

== Personal life ==
Martinez married Tim Carswell on May 2nd 2025.

== Filmography ==
=== Television ===
Year	Title	Role	Notes
2019	RuPaul's Drag Race	Herself	Contestant (7th Place)
2019	RuPaul's Drag Race: Untucked	Herself	Companion show to RuPaul's Drag Race
2019	Tales of the City	Drag queen	Extra
2026	RuPaul's Drag Race All Stars	Herself	Contestant
2026	RuPaul's Drag Race All Stars: Untucked	Herself	Companion show to RuPaul's Drag Race All Stars

=== Web series ===
Year	Title	Role	Notes	Ref.
2018	Drag Babies	Herself	Drag Mentor	
2019	Queen to Queen	Herself	With Scarlet Envy and Kahanna Montrese	
2019	Da Fuq	Herself	Guest, hosted by Honey Davenport	
2019	I've Never Had a ...	Herself	Guest	
2019	Countdown to the Crown	Herself	Season 11	
2019	Whatcha Packin'	Herself	Guest	
2019	Cosmo Queens	Herself	Cosmopolitan Series	
2019	Charo's Pink Room	Herself	With Charo	
2019	Shuga in the Raw	Herself	Host	
2019	Take a Look Back	Herself	Series by Yuhua Hamasaki	
2019	Gimme Some Shuga	Herself	Host	
2019	Bootleg Opinions	Herself	Guest, hosted by Yuhua Hamasaki	
2020	Out of the Closet	Herself	Guest	

=== Music videos ===
Year	Title	Ref(s)
2020	"Sweet Love"	

== Discography ==
=== Singles ===
Year	Title
2020	"Sweet Love"

== Theatre ==
Year	Production	Role	Venue	Notes	Ref(s)
2011	Xanadu	Sonny Malone	New Conservatory Theatre Center	Credited as Jesus Martinez	

== See also ==
- LGBTQ culture in New York City
- List of LGBTQ people from New York City
