= RuPaul's Drag Race season 11 =

2019 season of RuPaul's Drag Race

RuPaul's Drag Race
- Season 11
- Promotional poster for season eleven
- Hosted by: RuPaul
- Judges: RuPaul; Michelle Visage; Carson Kressley; Ross Mathews
- No. of contestants: 15
- Winner: Yvie Oddly
- Runner-up: Brooke Lynn Hytes
- Miss Congeniality: Nina West
- Companion show: RuPaul's Drag Race: Untucked!
- No. of episodes: 14

Release
- Original network: VH1
- Original release: February 28 – May 30, 2019

Season chronology
- ← Previous; Season 10 Next → Season 12

The eleventh season of RuPaul's Drag Race aired on VH1 from February 28, 2019, to May 30, 2019. The cast featured fourteen new queens and one returning queen; at the time of its premiere, Season 11 featured the largest cast of the franchise, with fifteen queens, though this was later surpassed by Season 15, which featured sixteen contestants. The queens were revealed during a livestream, hosted by Season 10 winner Aquaria and figure skater Adam Rippon, on January 24, 2019.

The winner of the eleventh season of RuPaul's Drag Race was Yvie Oddly, with Brooke Lynn Hytes being the runner-up and Nina West crowned as Miss Congeniality. Drag Race Season 10's first-eliminated contestant, Vanessa Vanjie Mateo, returned to the competition, by popular demand, being the first to enter the workroom and ultimately placing fifth.

== Contestants ==
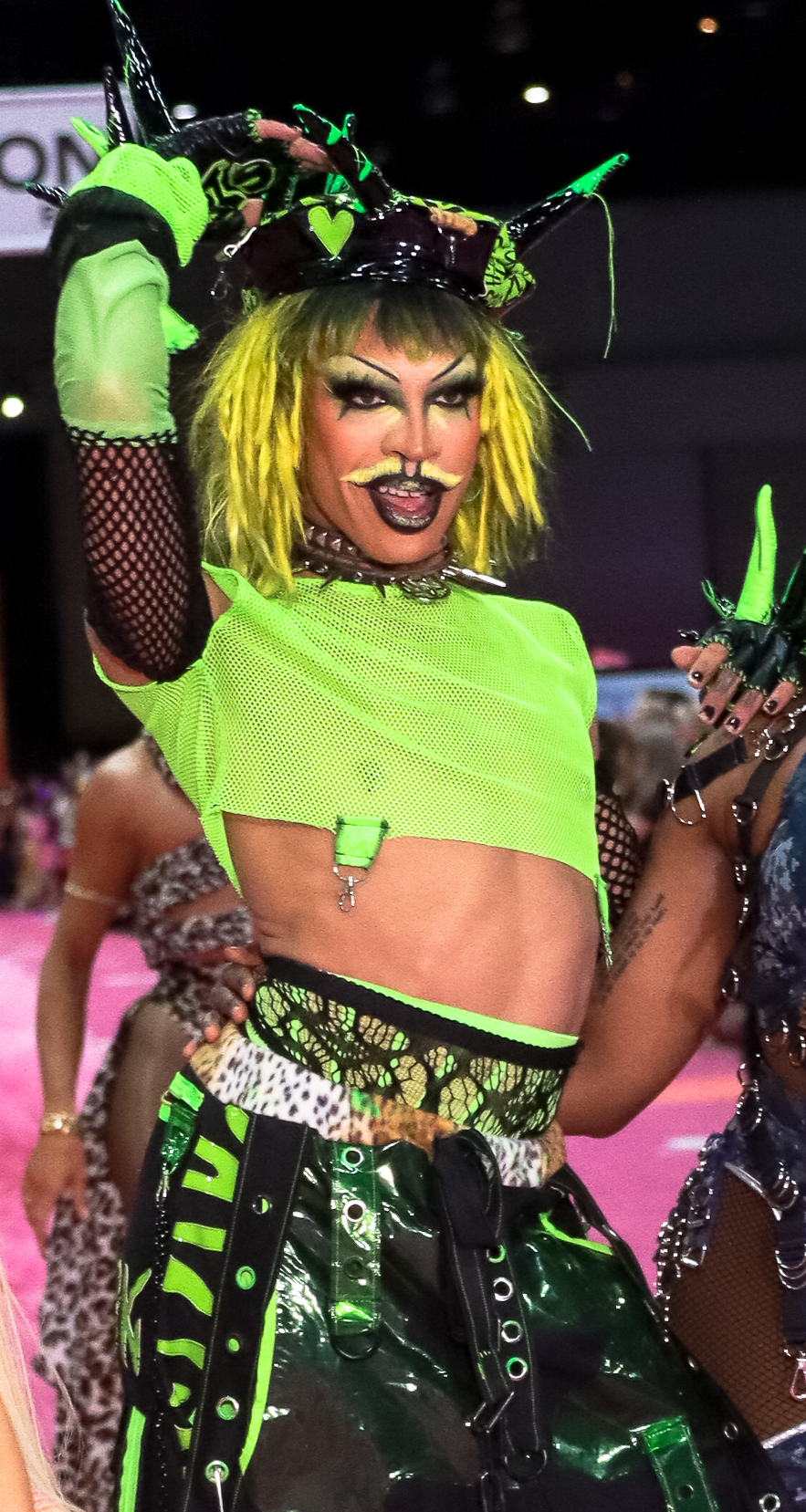
The winner, Yvie Oddly

Ages, names, and cities stated are at time of filming.

Contestants of RuPaul's Drag Race season 11 and their backgrounds
Contestant	Age	Hometown	Outcome
Yvie Oddly	24	Denver, Colorado	Winner
Brooke Lynn Hytes	32	Nashville, Tennessee	Runner-up
A'keria C. Davenport (Note: A'keria Chanel Davenport is referred to as A'keria C. Davenport on the show.)	30	Dallas, Texas	3rd place
Silky Nutmeg Ganache	28	Chicago, Illinois	3rd place
Vanessa Vanjie Mateo (Note: Vanessa Vanjie Mateo previously competed on season 10.) (Note: Vanessa Vanjie is referred to as Vanessa Vanjie Mateo on the show.)	26	Tampa, Florida	5th place
Nina West	39	Columbus, Ohio	6th place (Note: Nina West was voted Miss Congeniality by fellow contestants.)
Shuga Cain	40	New York, New York	7th place
Plastique Tiara	21	Dallas, Texas	8th place
Ra'Jah O'Hara (Note: Ra'Jah Davenport O'Hara is referred to as Ra'Jah O'Hara on the show.)	33	Dallas, Texas	9th place
Scarlet Envy	26	New York, New York	10th place
Ariel Versace	26	Cherry Hill, New Jersey	11th place
Mercedes Iman Diamond	31	Minneapolis, Minnesota	12th place
Honey Davenport	32	New York, New York	13th place
Kahanna Montrese	25	Las Vegas, Nevada	14th place
Soju	27	Chicago, Illinois	15th place

== Contestant progress ==
Legend:

Yvie Oddly won RuPaul's Drag Race season 11.
Brooke Lynn Hytes was the runner-up.
Nina West was voted Miss Congeniality (Miss C) by fellow contestants.
WIN indicates that the contestant won the challenge.
SAFE indicates that the contestant was declared safe by the judges.
BTM (Bottom) indicates that the contestant was up for elimination.
ELIM (Eliminated) indicates that the contestant was eliminated.
Guest indicates that the contestant returned as a guest.

Progress of contestants including placements in each episode
Contestant	Episode													
Contestant	1	2	3	4	5	6	7	8	9	10	11	12	13	14
Yvie Oddly	SAFE	WIN	SAFE	SAFE	SAFE	SAFE	SAFE	BTM	SAFE	SAFE	SAFE	SAFE	Guest	Winner
Brooke Lynn Hytes	WIN	SAFE	SAFE	SAFE	WIN	SAFE	SAFE	BTM	SAFE	SAFE	WIN	BTM	Guest	Runner-up
A'keria C. Davenport	SAFE	SAFE	BTM	SAFE	SAFE	WIN	BTM	SAFE	WIN	SAFE	SAFE	SAFE	Guest	Eliminated
Silky Nutmeg Ganache	SAFE	SAFE	SAFE	WIN	SAFE	SAFE	SAFE	WIN	SAFE	SAFE	BTM	SAFE	Guest	Eliminated
Vanessa Vanjie Mateo	SAFE	SAFE	SAFE	SAFE	SAFE	SAFE	SAFE	SAFE	BTM	BTM	SAFE	ELIM	Guest	Guest
Nina West	SAFE	SAFE	WIN	SAFE	SAFE	SAFE	SAFE	SAFE	SAFE	WIN	ELIM		Guest	Miss C
Shuga Cain	SAFE	SAFE	BTM	SAFE	BTM	SAFE	SAFE	SAFE	SAFE	ELIM	Guest		Guest	Guest
Plastique Tiara	SAFE	SAFE	BTM	SAFE	SAFE	SAFE	WIN	SAFE	ELIM		Guest		Guest	Guest
Ra'Jah O'Hara	SAFE	SAFE	BTM	BTM	SAFE	BTM	ELIM						Guest	Guest
Scarlet Envy	SAFE	WIN	BTM	SAFE	SAFE	ELIM					Guest		Guest	Guest
Ariel Versace	SAFE	SAFE	SAFE	SAFE	ELIM						Guest		Guest	Guest
Mercedes Iman Diamond	SAFE	BTM	SAFE	ELIM									Guest	Guest
Honey Davenport	SAFE	SAFE	ELIM								Guest		Guest	Guest
Kahanna Montrese	BTM	ELIM											Guest	Guest
Soju	ELIM										Guest		Guest	Guest

== Lip syncs ==
Legend:

The contestant was eliminated after their first time in the bottom.
The contestant was eliminated after their second time in the bottom.
The contestant was eliminated after their third time in the bottom.
The contestant was eliminated after their fourth time in the bottom.
The contestant won the first round of the Lip Sync Smackdown for the Crown.
The contestant won the second round of the Lip Sync Smackdown for the Crown and was declared the winner of the season.

Episode	Contestants			Song	Eliminated
1	Kahanna Montrese	vs.	Soju	"The Best of Both Worlds" (Hannah Montana)	Soju
2	Kahanna Montrese	vs.	Mercedes Iman Diamond	"Work Bitch" (Britney Spears)	Kahanna Montrese
3	A'keria C. Davenport vs. Honey Davenport vs. Plastique Tiara vs. Ra'Jah O'Hara vs. Scarlet Envy vs. Shuga Cain			"Waiting for Tonight (Hex Hector Mix)" (Jennifer Lopez)	Honey Davenport
4	Mercedes Iman Diamond	vs.	Ra'Jah O'Hara	"Living in America" (James Brown)	Mercedes Iman Diamond
5	Ariel Versace	vs.	Shuga Cain	"I'm Your Baby Tonight" (Whitney Houston)	Ariel Versace
6	Ra'Jah O'Hara	vs.	Scarlet Envy	"Last Dance" (Donna Summer)	Scarlet Envy
7	A'keria C. Davenport	vs.	Ra'Jah O'Hara	"Strut" (Sheena Easton)	Ra'Jah O'Hara
8	Brooke Lynn Hytes	vs.	Yvie Oddly	"Sorry Not Sorry" (Demi Lovato)	None
9	Plastique Tiara	vs.	Vanessa Vanjie Mateo	"Hood Boy" (Fantasia)	Plastique Tiara
10	Shuga Cain	vs.	Vanessa Vanjie Mateo	"No More Drama" (Mary J. Blige)	Shuga Cain
11	Nina West	vs.	Silky Nutmeg Ganache	"No Scrubs" (TLC)	Nina West
12	Brooke Lynn Hytes	vs.	Vanessa Vanjie Mateo	"Pride (A Deeper Love)" (Aretha Franklin)	Vanessa Vanjie Mateo
Episode	Contestants			Song	Winner
14	Brooke Lynn Hytes	vs.	Silky Nutmeg Ganache	"Bootylicious" (Destiny's Child)	Brooke Lynn Hytes
14	A'keria C. Davenport	vs.	Yvie Oddly	"SOS" (Rihanna)	Yvie Oddly
14	Brooke Lynn Hytes	vs.	Yvie Oddly	"The Edge of Glory" (Lady Gaga)	Yvie Oddly

== Guest judges ==
Listed in chronological order:

- Miley Cyrus, singer, actress
- Bobby Moynihan, actor, comedian
- Sydelle Noel, actress, athlete
- Guillermo Díaz, actor
- Troye Sivan, singer, songwriter
- Joel McHale, actor, comedian
- Tiffany Pollard, reality television personality
- Cara Delevingne, model, actress
- Elvira, Mistress of the Dark, actress, television hostess
- Mirai Nagasu, figure skater
- Adam Rippon, figure skater
- Travis Wall, dancer, choreographer
- Kandi Burruss, singer, songwriter, reality television personality
- Amber Valletta, model, actress
- Clea DuVall, actress
- Tony Hale, actor
- Fortune Feimster, actress, comedian
- Cheyenne Jackson, actor, singer
- Natasha Lyonne, actress
- Katherine Langford, actress
- Gina Rodriguez, actress
- Wanda Sykes, actress, comedian, writer
- Lena Waithe, writer, actress
- Todrick Hall, singer, director, choreographer & former RuPaul's Drag Race All Stars judge

=== Special guests ===
Guests who appeared in episodes, but did not judge on the main stage.

Episode 1

- Adore Delano, contestant on season 6 and All Stars season 2
- Delta Work, contestant on season 3
- Derrick Barry, contestant on season 8
- Eureka, contestant on season 9 and season 10
- Farrah Moan, contestant on season 9 and All Stars season 4
- Ginger Minj, contestant on season 7 and All Stars season 2
- Jasmine Masters, contestant on season 7 and All Stars season 4
- Kimora Blac, contestant on season 9
- Manila Luzon, contestant on season 3, All Stars season 1, and All Stars season 4
- Mariah Balenciaga, contestant on season 3
- Ongina, contestant on season 1
- Raja, winner of season 3
- Raven, contestant on season 2 and All Stars season 1
- Kylie Sonique Love, contestant on season 2
- Victoria "Porkchop" Parker, contestant on season 1

Episode 2

- Derrick Barry, contestant on season 8

Episode 4

- Rachel Maddow, journalist, political commentator
- Yanis Marshall, French choreographer and dancer
- Ginger Minj, contestant on season 7 and All Stars season 2

Episode 5

- Trixie Mattel, contestant on season 7 and winner of All Stars season 3

Episode 6

- Love Connie, drag performer

Episode 7

- Alyssa Edwards, contestant on season 5 and All Stars season 2

Episode 8

- Jinkx Monsoon, winner of season 5
- Morgan McMichaels, contestant on season 2 and All Stars season 3

Episode 10

- Delta Work, contestant on season 3
- Kyle Marlett, magician
- Raven, contestant on season 2 and All Stars season 1

Episode 11

- Shuga Cain, contestant on season eleven
- Plastique Tiara, contestant on season eleven
- Scarlet Envy, contestant on season eleven
- Ariel Versace, contestant on season eleven
- Honey Davenport, contestant on season eleven
- Soju, contestant on season eleven

Episode 14

- Fortune Feimster, comedian
- Tiffany Pollard, television personality
- Ts Madison, television personality, actress, and activist
- Christine and the Queens, French singer
- Eureka, contestant on season 9 and season 10
- Mayhem Miller, contestant on season 10
- Monique Heart, contestant on season 10 and All Stars season 4
- Blair St. Clair, contestant on season 10
- Jaymes Mansfield, contestant on season 9
- Pandora Boxx, "Miss Congeniality" of season 2 and contestant on All Stars season 1
- Mrs. Kasha Davis, contestant on season 7
- Nicole Paige Brooks, contestant on season 2
- Jasmine Masters, contestant on season 7 and All Stars season 4
- Yuhua Hamasaki, contestant on season 10
- Venus D-Lite, contestant on season 3
- Raja, winner of season 3
- Kennedy Davenport, contestant on season 7 and All Stars season 3
- Ongina, contestant on season 1
- Kimora Blac, contestant on season 9
- Serena ChaCha, contestant on season 5
- Kylie Sonique Love, contestant on season 2
- Alexis Mateo, contestant on season 3 and All Stars season 1
- Coco Montrese, contestant on season 5 and All Stars season 2
- Cheyenne Jackson, actor and singer
- Love Connie, drag performer
- Monét X Change, "Miss Congeniality" of season 10 and winner of All Stars season 4
- Aquaria, winner of season 10

== Episodes ==
No. overall	No. in season	Title	Original release date
132	1	"Whatcha Unpackin?"	February 28, 2019
Fourteen new queens enter the workroom. Vanessa Vanjie Mateo, who was eliminated first last season, made a comeback to compete again. For the first mini-challenge, the queens do a photoshoot with past Drag Race queens. Silky Nutmeg Ganache wins the mini-challenge. For the main challenge, the queens create an outfit using materials belonging to former RuPaul's Drag Race queens. On the runway, A'keria C. Davenport, Brooke Lynn Hytes, Plastique Tiara and Vanessa Vanjie Mateo receive positive critiques, with Brooke Lynn Hytes winning the challenge. Kahanna Montrese, Mercedes Iman Diamond, Nina West and Soju receive negative critiques, with Mercedes Iman Diamond and Nina West being safe. Kahanna Montrese and Soju lip-sync to "The Best of Both Worlds" by Hannah Montana. Kahanna Montrese wins the lip-sync and Soju is the first queen to sashay away.: Guest Judge: Miley Cyrus; Alternating Judges: Carson Kressley and Ross Mathews; Mini-Challenge: Photoshoot with past Drag Race queens; Mini-Challenge Winner: Silky Nutmeg Ganache; Mini-Challenge Prize: A $2,500 gift card from Arda Wigs; Main Challenge: Create an outfit using materials belonging to former RuPaul's Drag Race queens; Challenge Winner: Brooke Lynn Hytes; Challenge Prize: A seven night stay in Paris, France courtesy of misterb&b; Bottom Two: Kahanna Montrese and Soju; Lip-Sync Song: "The Best of Both Worlds" by Hannah Montana; Eliminated: Soju; Farewell Message: "I LOVE ALL OF YOU CYSTERS! HAVE FUN ♥︎ — GEONBAE, BITCHES! SOJU ♥︎"
133	2	"Good God Girl, Get Out"	March 7, 2019
For this week's mini-challenge, the queens photobomb iconic celebrity pictures. Brooke Lynn Hytes and Silky Nutmeg Ganache win the mini-challenge. For the main challenge, the queens perform in drag film adaptions of Black Panther and Get Out.: Team Good God Girl, Get Out!: A'keria C. Davenport, Kahanna Montrese, Mercedes Iman Diamond, Silky Nutmeg Ganache, Scarlet Envy, Vanessa Vanjie Mateo and Yvie Oddly; Team Why It Gotta Be Black, Panther?: Ariel Versace, Brooke Lynn Hytes, Honey Davenport, Nina West, Plastique Tiara, Ra'Jah O'Hara and Shuga Cain; On the runway, category is What's Your Sign? Plastique Tiara, Scarlet Envy, Shuga Cain and Yvie Oddly receive positive critiques, with Scarlet Envy and Yvie Oddly both winning the challenge. Ariel Versace, Brooke Lynn Hytes, Kahanna Montrese and Mercedes Iman Diamond receive negative critiques, with Ariel Versace and Brooke Lynn Hytes being safe. Kahanna Montrese and Mercedes Iman Diamond lip-sync to "Work Bitch" by Britney Spears. Mercedes Iman Diamond wins the lip-sync and Kahanna Montrese sashays away.: Guest Judges: Sydelle Noel and Bobby Moynihan; Alternating Judge: Ross Mathews; Mini-Challenge: Photobomb iconic celebrity pictures; Mini-Challenge Winners: Brooke Lynn Hytes and Silky Nutmeg Ganache; Mini-Challenge Prize: A $1,000 gift card from Fierce Queen; Main Challenge: Perform in drag film adaptations of Black Panther and Get Out; Runway Theme: What's Your Sign?; Challenge Winners: Scarlet Envy and Yvie Oddly; Challenge Prize: A $2,500 gift card from The Crème Shop; Bottom Two: Kahanna Montrese and Mercedes Iman Diamond; Lip-Sync Song: "Work Bitch" by Britney Spears; Eliminated: Kahanna Montrese; Farewell Message: "For the first time I’ve felt like I truly belonged. Thank you for embracing me & making me feel loved. Xoxo, Kahanna"
134	3	"Diva Worship"	March 14, 2019
For this week's mini-challenge, the queens have to seduce their way into a Seduction concert. Nina West and Ra'Jah O'Hara win the mini-challenge. For the main challenge, the queens team up and star in a she-vangelical talk show worshipping a diva.: Team Britney Spears - Ariel Versace, Brooke Lynn Hytes, Mercedes Iman Diamond, Nina West, Silky Nutmeg Ganache, Vanessa Vanjie Mateo and Yvie Oddly; Team Mariah Carey - A'keria C. Davenport, Honey Davenport, Plastique Tiara, Ra'Jah O'Hara, Scarlet Envy and Shuga Cain; On the runway, category is Fringe. Team Britney Spears is the winning team, with Nina West winning the challenge. Team Mariah Carey is the losing team, with A'keria C. Davenport, Honey Davenport, Plastique Tiara, Ra'Jah O'Hara, Scarlet Envy and Shuga Cain being announced as the bottom six. They lip-sync to "Waiting for Tonight (Hex Hector Mix)" by Jennifer Lopez. A'keria C. Davenport, Plastique Tiara, Ra'Jah O'Hara, Scarlet Envy and Shuga Cain win the lip-sync and Honey Davenport sashays away.: Guest Judges: Guillermo Díaz and Troye Sivan; Alternating Judge: Ross Mathews; Mini-Challenge: Seduce your way into a Seduction concert; Mini-Challenge Winners: Nina West and Ra'Jah O'Hara; Mini-Challenge Prize: A $1,500 gift card from J.J. Malibu; Main Challenge: In teams, star in a she-vangelical talk show worshiping a diva; Runway Theme: Fringe; Challenge Winner: Nina West; Challenge Prize: A $3,500 gift card from ISLYNYC; Bottom Six: A'keria C. Davenport, Honey Davenport, Plastique Tiara, Ra'Jah O'Hara, Scarlet Envy and Shuga Cain; Lip-Sync Song: "Waiting for Tonight (Hex Hector Mix)" by Jennifer Lopez; Eliminated: Honey Davenport; Farewell Message: "Sisters, if nothing else show the world your heart. I hope y'all saw mine. Xoxo, Honey"
135	4	"Trump: The Rusical"	March 21, 2019
For this week's mini-challenge, the queens get into Rachel Maddow drag and read from a teleprompter. Scarlet Envy wins the mini-challenge. For the main challenge, the queens perform in Trump: The Rusical.: A'keria C. Davenport plays Stormy Daniels; Ariel Versace plays Shandy; Brooke Lynn Hytes plays Ivana Trump; Mercedes Iman Diamond plays Ivanka Trump; Nina West plays Sarah Huckabee Sanders; Plastique Tiara plays Melania Trump; Ra'Jah O'Hara plays Omarosa; Scarlet Envy plays Betsy DeVos; Shuga Cain plays Hillary Clinton; Silky Nutmeg Ganache plays Oprah Winfrey; Vanessa Vanjie Mateo plays Rosie O'Donnell; Yvie Oddly plays Kellyanne Conway; On the runway, category is Orange Alert. Brooke Lynn Hytes, Silky Nutmeg Ganache and Yvie Oddly receive positive critiques, with Silky Nutmeg Ganache winning the challenge. Mercedes Iman Diamond, Ra'Jah O'Hara and Vanessa Vanjie Mateo receive negative critiques, with Vanessa Vanjie Mateo being safe. Mercedes Iman Diamond and Ra'Jah O'Hara lip-sync to "Living in America" by James Brown. Ra'Jah O'Hara wins the lip-sync and Mercedes Iman Diamond sashays away.: Guest Judges: Tiffany Pollard and Joel McHale; Alternating Judge: Ross Mathews; Mini-Challenge: Why You Maddow, Tho?; Mini-Challenge Winner: Scarlet Envy; Mini-Challenge Prize: A $3,000 gift card from The Divas Jewels; Main Challenge: Trump: The Rusical; Runway Theme: Orange Alert; Challenge Winner: Silky Nutmeg Ganache; Challenge Prize: A getaway to The Grand Resort and Spa in Fort Lauderdale; Bottom Two: Mercedes Iman Diamond and Ra'Jah O'Hara; Lip-Sync Song: "Living in America" by James Brown; Eliminated: Mercedes Iman Diamond; Farewell Message: "It was so great meeting you gurls. Love y'all, Mercedes"
136	5	"Monster Ball"	March 28, 2019
For this week's mini-challenge, the queens create a living doll. Ra'Jah O'Hara wins the mini-challenge. For the main challenge, the queens create three looks for The Monster Ball: Trampy Trick or Treater, Witch Please! and MILF Eleganza. On the runway, Brooke Lynn Hytes, Plastique Tiara and Yvie Oddly receive positive critiques, with Brooke Lynn Hytes winning the challenge. Ariel Versace, Shuga Cain and Silky Nutmeg Ganache receive negative critiques, with Silky Nutmeg Ganache being safe. Ariel Versace and Shuga Cain lip-sync to "I'm Your Baby Tonight" by Whitney Houston. Shuga Cain wins the lip-sync and Ariel Versace sashays away.: Guest Judges: Cara Delevingne and Elvira; Alternating Judge: Ross Mathews; Mini-Challenge: Create a living doll; Mini-Challenge Winner: Ra'Jah O'Hara; Mini-Challenge Prize: A $1,000 gift card from Coolhaus Ice Cream; Main Challenge: The Monster Ball; Runway Themes: Trampy Trick or Treater, Witch Please! and MILF Eleganza; Challenge Winner: Brooke Lynn Hytes; Challenge Prize: A $3,000 gift card from Travelgay.com; Bottom Two: Ariel Versace and Shuga Cain; Lip-Sync Song: "I'm Your Baby Tonight" by Whitney Houston; Eliminated: Ariel Versace; Farewell Message: "You girls taught me what sister (cyster) really is ☹ Kill it! ♡ u girls. Xoxo, Ariel. Mom!!!!"
137	6	"The Draglympics"	April 4, 2019
For this week's mini-challenge, the queens do Galisthenics with Love Connie. A'keria C. Davenport and Plastique Tiara win the mini-challenge. For the main challenge, the queens team up and perform in a free-style floor performance which includes Fanography, Voguing and Shablam.: Team Glamazonia - Nina West, Plastique Tiara, Ra'Jah O'Hara, Scarlet Envy and Vanessa Vanjie Mateo; Team Tuckpanistan - A'keria C. Davenport, Brooke Lynn Hytes, Shuga Cain, Silky Nutmeg Ganache and Yvie Oddly; On the runway, category is All That Glitters is Gold. Team Tuckpanistan is the winning team, with A'keria C. Davenport winning the challenge. Team Glamazonia is the losing team. Nina West, Ra'Jah O'Hara and Scarlet Envy receive negative critiques, with Nina West being safe. Ra'Jah O'Hara and Scarlet Envy lip-sync to "Last Dance" by Donna Summer. Ra'Jah O'Hara wins the lip-sync and Scarlet Envy sashays away.: Guest Judges: Travis Wall, Mirai Nagasu and Adam Rippon; Mini-Challenge: Galisthenics with Love Connie; Mini-Challenge Winners: A'keria C. Davenport and Plastique Tiara; Mini-Challenge Prize: A $1,500 gift card from MuLondon; Main Challenge: Perform in a free-style floor performance which includes Fanography, Voguing and Shablam; Runway Theme: All That Glitters is Gold; Challenge Winner: A'keria C. Davenport; Challenge Prize: A $2,500 gift card from daftboy and $2,500 gift card from Elea's Closet; Bottom Two: Ra'Jah O'Hara and Scarlet Envy; Lip-Sync Song: "Last Dance" by Donna Summer; Eliminated: Scarlet Envy; Farewell Message: "You know she loves a mirror and she loves you too. Meet you on the late night dance floor. XOXO Scarlet"
138	7	"From Farm to Runway"	April 11, 2019
For this week's mini-challenge, the queens participate in a potato sack race serving boob-ography. Nina West and Shuga Cain win the mini-challenge. For the main challenge, the queens create an outfit made out of organic materials. On the runway, category is Farm to Runway. Brooke Lynn Hytes, Plastique Tiara and Yvie Oddly receive positive critiques, with Plastique Tiara winning the challenge. A'keria C. Davenport, Ra'Jah O'Hara and Nina West receive negative critiques, with Nina West being safe. A'keria C. Davenport and Ra'Jah O'Hara lip-sync to "Strut" by Sheena Easton. A'keria C. Davenport wins the lip-sync and Ra'Jah O'Hara sashays away.: Guest Judges: Kandi Burruss and Amber Valletta; Alternating Judge: Ross Mathews; Mini-Challenge: Participate in a potato sack race serving boob-ography; Mini-Challenge Winners: Nina West and Shuga Cain; Mini-Challenge Prize: A $2,500 cash tip courtesy of Hask; Main Challenge: Create an outfit made out of organic materials; Runway Theme: Farm to Runway; Challenge Winner: Plastique Tiara; Challenge Prize: A five night trip to Toronto courtesy of Tourism Toronto; Bottom Two: A'keria C. Davenport and Ra'Jah O'Hara; Lip-Sync Song: "Strut" by Sheena Easton; Eliminated: Ra'Jah O'Hara; Farewell Message: "It's a beautiful day in the 'hood'...wait gotta be my neighbor! XOXO – Rajah. P.S. – She was the only one to take me out! LOL Love y'all"
139	8	"Snatch Game at Sea"	April 18, 2019
For this week's mini-challenge, the queens pitch their own self-help book. Silky Nutmeg Ganache wins the mini-challenge. For the main challenge, the queens play the Snatch Game at Sea. Tony Hale and Clea Duvall star as the celebrity contestants. The cast consisted of: A'keria C. Davenport as Tiffany Haddish; Brooke Lynn Hytes as Celine Dion; Nina West as Harvey Fierstein and Jo Anne Worley; Plastique Tiara as Lovely Mimi; Shuga Cain as Charo; Silky Nutmeg Ganache as Ts Madison; Vanessa Vanjie Mateo as Danielle Bregoli; Yvie Oddly as Whoopi Goldberg; On the runway, category is Sequins on the Runway. Nina West, Shuga Cain and Silky Nutmeg Ganache receive positive critiques, with Silky Nutmeg Ganache winning the challenge. Brooke Lynn Hytes, Vanessa Vanjie Mateo and Yvie Oddly receive negative critiques, with Vanessa Vanjie Mateo being safe. Brooke Lynn Hytes and Yvie Oddly lip-sync to "Sorry Not Sorry" by Demi Lovato. They are both declared the winners of the lip-sync and no one goes home.: Guest Judges: Tony Hale and Clea DuVall; Alternating Judge: Ross Mathews; Mini-Challenge: Pitch your own Self-Help Book; Mini-Challenge Winner: Silky Nutmeg Ganache; Mini-Challenge Prize: A $1,000 credit from Postmates; Main Challenge: Snatch Game at Sea; Runway Theme: Sequins on the Runway; Challenge Winner: Silky Nutmeg Ganache; Challenge Prize: A $5,000 gift certificate from VACAYA; Bottom Two: Brooke Lynn Hytes and Yvie Oddly; Lip-Sync Song: "Sorry Not Sorry" by Demi Lovato; Eliminated: None
140	9	"L.A.D.P.!"	April 25, 2019
For this week's mini-challenge, the queens read each other to filth. Brooke Lynn Hytes wins the mini-challenge. For the main challenge, the queens pair up and perform in an improvised comedy police sketch for the hit TV series "Los Angeles Drag Patrol (L.A.D.P.)": Twerking Girls Corner Disturbance - A'keria C. Davenport and Yvie Oddly; Indecent Exposure at the Trailer Park - Brooke Lynn Hytes and Nina West; Catfight at the Liquor Store - Plastique Tiara and Vanessa Vanjie Mateo; Back Alley Butt Pads - Shuga Cain and Silky Nutmeg Ganache; On the runway, category is Face-Kini Fantasy. A'keria C. Davenport, Brooke Lynn Hytes and Silky Nutmeg Ganache receive positive critiques, with A'keria C. Davenport winning the challenge. Plastique Tiara, Shuga Cain and Vanessa Vanjie Mateo receive negative critiques, with Shuga Cain being safe. Plastique Tiara and Vanessa Vanjie Mateo lip-sync to "Hood Boy" by Fantasia. Vanessa Vanjie Mateo wins the lip-sync and Plastique Tiara sashays away.: Guest Judges: Fortune Feimster, Cheyenne Jackson and Natasha Lyonne; Mini-Challenge: Reading is Fundamental; Mini-Challenge Winner: Brooke Lynn Hytes; Mini-Challenge Prize: A $2,500 gift card to l.a.Eyeworks; Main Challenge: In pairs, perform in an improvised comedy police sketch for the hit TV series "Los Angeles Drag Patrol (L.A.D.P.)"; Runway Theme: Face-Kini Fantasy; Challenge Winner: A'keria C. Davenport; Challenge Prize: 2 VIP tickets to Cirque du Soleil: Zumanity in Las Vegas, including flights and hotel accommodations; Bottom Two: Plastique Tiara and Vanessa Vanjie Mateo; Lip-Sync Song: "Hood Boy" by Fantasia; Eliminated: Plastique Tiara; Farewell Message: "I love yall so much ♡ Thank you for being so kind! Plastique ♡"
141	10	"Dragracadabra"	May 2, 2019
For this week's mini-challenge, the queens play a game called "Balls to the Wall", where the queens will pair up with a pit crew member to transfer as many balls to a basket, using different parts of their bodies. Vanessa Vanjie Mateo wins the mini-challenge. For the main challenge, the queens team up and perform a magic show in front of the judges and a live audience.: Team Da Black Magic - A'keria C' Davenport, Silky Nutmeg Ganache, Vanessa Vanjie Mateo and Yvie Oddly; Team The Mighty Tucks - Brooke Lynn Hytes, Nina West and Shuga Cain; On the runway, category is Caftan Realness. Brooke Lynn Hytes and Nina West receive positive critiques, with Nina West winning the challenge. Shuga Cain, Silky Nutmeg Ganache and Vanessa Vanjie Mateo receive negative critiques, with Silky Nutmeg Ganache being safe. Shuga Cain and Vanessa Vanjie Mateo lip-sync to "No More Drama" by Mary J. Blige. Vanessa Vanjie Mateo wins the lip-sync and Shuga Cain sashays away.: Guest Judges: Katherine Langford and Gina Rodriguez; Alternating Judge: Ross Mathews; Mini-Challenge: "Balls to the Wall"; Mini-Challenge Winner: Vanessa Vanjie Mateo; Mini-Challenge Prize: A $2,500 gift card from Dirt Squirrel; Main Challenge: In teams, perform a magic show in front of the judges and a live audience; Runway Theme: Caftan Realness; Challenge Winner: Nina West; Challenge Prize: A $3,000 gift card from Marek & Richard and $3,000 gift card from OutOfOffice.com; Bottom Two: Shuga Cain and Vanessa Vanjie Mateo; Lip-Sync Song: "No More Drama" by Mary J. Blige; Eliminated: Shuga Cain; Farewell Message: "You all hold a very special place in my heart. Make Nana proud ♡ Shuga"
142	11	"Bring Back My Queens!"	May 9, 2019
For this week's mini-challenge, the queens attempt to make the other queens slap them. Brooke Lynn Hytes wins the mini-challenge. For the main challenge, the queens makeover the eliminated queens.: A'keria C. Davenport and Honey Davenport; Brooke Lynn Hytes and Plastique Tiara; Nina West and Shuga Cain; Silky Nutmeg Ganache and Soju; Vanessa Vanjie Mateo and Ariel Versace; Yvie Oddly and Scarlet Envy; On the runway, category is Drag Family Values. A'keria C. Davenport, Brooke Lynn Hytes and Vanessa Vanjie Mateo receive positive critiques, with Brooke Lynn Hytes winning the challenge. Nina West, Silky Nutmeg Ganache and Yvie Oddly receive negative critiques, with Yvie Oddly being safe. Nina West and Silky Nutmeg Ganache lip-sync to "No Scrubs" by TLC. Silky Nutmeg Ganache wins the lip-sync and Nina West sashays away.: Guest Judges: Lena Waithe and Wanda Sykes; Alternating Judge: Ross Mathews; Mini-Challenge: Attempt to make the other queens slap them; Mini-Challenge Winner: Brooke Lynn Hytes; Mini-Challenge Prize: Nails and lashes from KISS USA, and a wig and styling package from Luxelab; Main Challenge: Makeover the eliminated queens; Runway Theme: Drag Family Values; Challenge Winner: Brooke Lynn Hytes; Challenge Prize: A trip for two to Aruba with complimentary airfare and a five-night stay at the Marriott Resort and Stellaris Casino for Brooke Lynn, and a $2,000 gift card from Klein Epstein & Parker for Plastique Tiara; Bottom Two: Nina West and Silky Nutmeg Ganache; Lip-Sync Song: "No Scrubs" by TLC; Eliminated: Nina West; Farewell Message: "My sisters. I love all of you so much. Thank you for your friendship. Go BIG, Be KIND, Go WEST. Love, Nina – The Pride of Season 11"
143	12	"Queens Everywhere"	May 16, 2019
For the final challenge of the season, the queens write, record, and perform verses to RuPaul's song "Queens Everywhere". On the runway, category is Best Drag. A'keria C. Davenport and Yvie Oddly receive positive critiques. Brooke Lynn Hytes, Silky Nutmeg Ganache and Vanessa Vanjie Mateo receive negative critiques, with Silky Nutmeg Ganache being safe. Brooke Lynn Hytes and Vanessa Vanjie Mateo lip-sync to "Pride: A Deeper Love" by Aretha Franklin. Brooke Lynn Hytes wins the lip-sync and Vanessa Vanjie Mateo sashays away.: Guest Judges: Todrick Hall; Alternating Judges: Carson Kressley and Ross Mathews; Main Challenge: Write, record, and perform verses to RuPaul's song "Queens Everywhere"; Runway Theme: Best Drag; Bottom Two: Brooke Lynn Hytes and Vanessa Vanjie Mateo; Lip-Sync Song: "Pride: A Deeper Love" by Aretha Franklin; Eliminated: Vanessa Vanjie Mateo; Farewell Message: "BITCHES! I ♡ you all not just the Vanjie way but the VANESSA VANJIE MATEO way! xoxo "snek it" $ Cut the check!"
144	13	"Reunited"	May 23, 2019
The queens all return for the reunion. Discussions include: Vanessa Vanjie Mateo and Brooke Lynn Hytes' relationship, Ra'Jah O'Hara's drama with Scarlet Envy and Yvie Oddly and Silky Nutmeg Ganache and Yvie Oddly's continuous drama this season.
145	14	"Grand Finale"	May 30, 2019
All the queens return for the grand finale. It is announced that Nina West is this season's Miss Congeniality. RuPaul then announces that the queens will take part in the lip-sync smackdown for the crown. The first lip-sync is between Brooke Lynn Hytes and Silky Nutmeg Ganache. They lip-sync to "Bootylicious" by Destiny's Child. Brooke Lynn Hytes wins the lip-sync and Silky Nutmeg Ganache is eliminated. The second lip-sync is between A'keria C. Davenport and Yvie Oddly. They lip-sync to "SOS" by Rihanna. Yvie Oddly wins the lip-sync and A'keria C. Davenport is eliminated. The final lip-sync is between Brooke Lynn Hytes and Yvie Oddly. They lip-sync to "The Edge of Glory" by Lady Gaga. It is announced that Yvie Oddly is the winner, leaving Brooke Lynn Hytes as the runner-up.: Finals Venue: Orpheum Theater, Los Angeles, California; Final Four: A'keria C. Davenport, Brooke Lynn Hytes, Silky Nutmeg Ganache and Yvie Oddly; Miss Congeniality: Nina West; Lip-Sync Smackdown #1: Brooke Lynn Hytes vs. Silky Nutmeg Ganache; Lip-Sync Song: "Bootylicious" by Destiny's Child; Eliminated: Silky Nutmeg Ganache; Lip-Sync Smackdown #2: A'keria C. Davenport vs. Yvie Oddly; Lip-Sync Song: "SOS" by Rihanna; Eliminated: A'keria C. Davenport; Lip-Sync Smackdown #3: Brooke Lynn Hytes vs. Yvie Oddly; Lip-Sync Song: "The Edge of Glory" by Lady Gaga; Runner-up: Brooke Lynn Hytes; Winner of RuPaul's Drag Race Season Eleven: Yvie Oddly

== Ratings ==
Viewership and ratings per episode of RuPaul's Drag Race season 11
No.	Title	Air date	Rating (18–49)	Viewers (millions)
1	"Whatcha Unpackin?"	February 28, 2019	0.30	0.631
2	"Good God Girl, Get Out"	March 7, 2019	0.28	0.586
3	"Diva Worship"	March 14, 2019	0.26	0.539
4	"Trump: The Rusical"	March 21, 2019	0.28	0.598
5	"Monster Ball"	March 28, 2019	0.27	0.542
6	"The Draglympics"	April 4, 2019	0.31	0.627
7	"From Farm to Runway"	April 11, 2019	0.24	0.529
8	"Snatch Game at Sea"	April 18, 2019	0.25	0.534
9	"L.A.D.P.!"	April 25, 2019	0.25	0.534
10	"Dragracadabra"	May 2, 2019	0.26	0.498
11	"Bring Back My Queens!"	May 9, 2019	0.28	0.555
12	"Queens Everywhere"	May 16, 2019	0.26	0.564
13	"Reunited"	May 23, 2019	0.23	0.483
14	"Grand Finale"	May 30, 2019	0.33	0.700
