= The Draglympics =

2019 episode of RuPaul's Drag Race

- RuPaul's Drag Race episode
- Episode no.: Season 11; Episode 6
- Original air date: April 4, 2019

Guest appearances
- Mirai Nagasu (guest judge); Adam Rippon (guest judge); Travis Wall (guest judge); Love Connie

Episode chronology
← Previous "Monster Ball"	Next → "From Farm to Runway"
- RuPaul's Drag Race season 11

"The Draglympics" is the sixth episode of the eleventh season of the American reality competition television series RuPaul's Drag Race. It originally aired on April 4, 2019. The episode's main challenge tasks the contestants with teaming up and performing in free-style floor performances. Mirai Nagasu, Adam Rippon, and Travis Wall are guest judges. Love Connie also makes a guest appearance for the mini-challenge. A'keria C. Davenport wins the episode's main challenge. Scarlet Envy is eliminated from the competition after placing in the bottom and losing a lip-sync contest against Ra'Jah O'Hara to "Last Dance" (1978) by Donna Summer.

== Episode ==
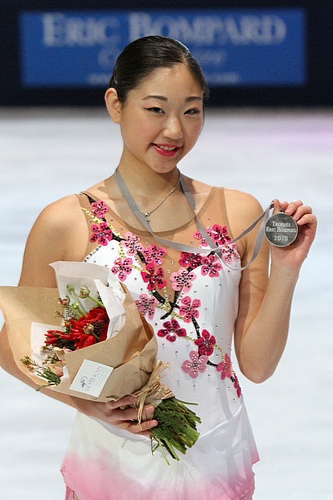
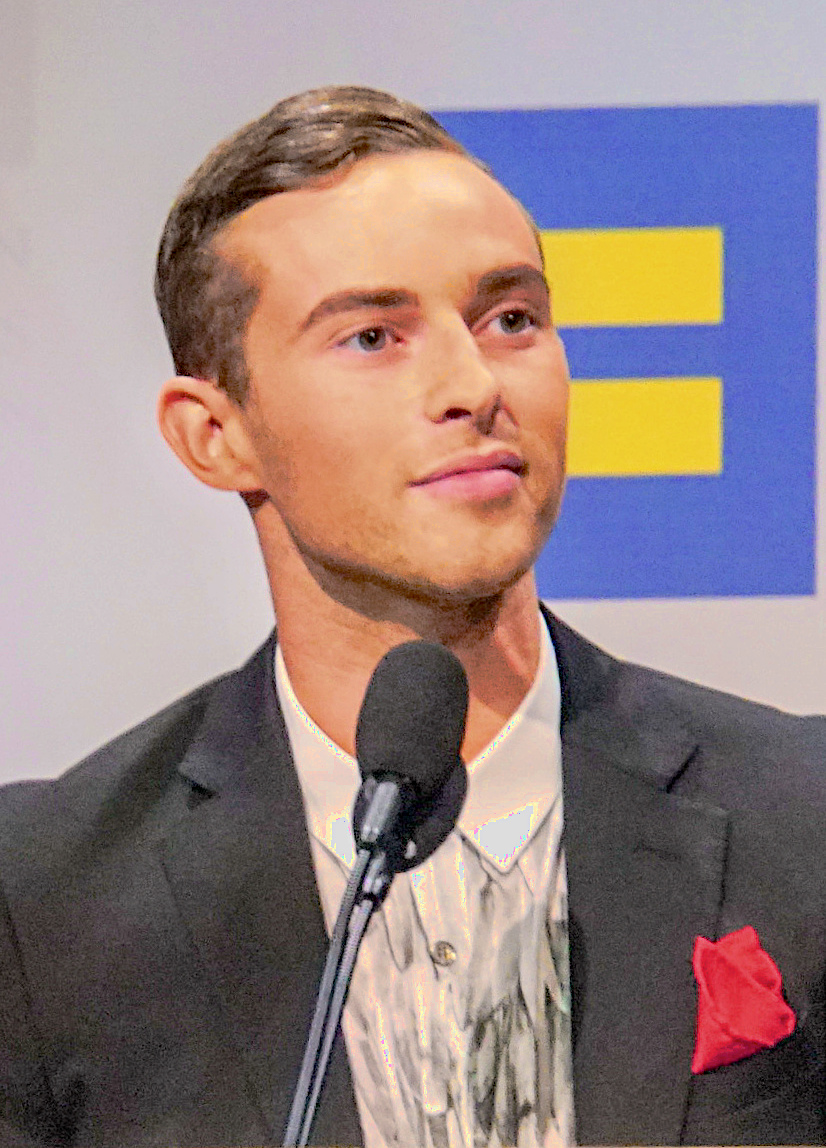
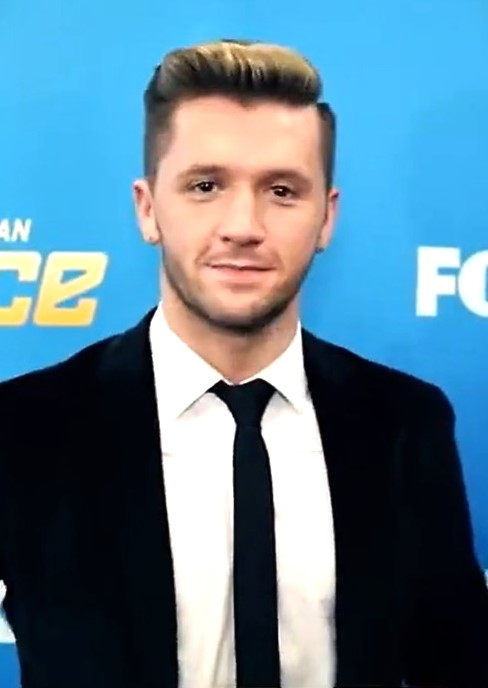
Mirai Nagasu (top), Adam Rippon (middle), and Travis Wall (bottom) are guest judges.

The contestants return to the Werk Room after Ariel Versace's elimination on the previous episode. On a new day, RuPaul greets the group and reveals the mini-challenge, which tasks the contestants with completing Galisthenics with guest Love Connie. A'keria C. Davenport and Plastique Tiara win the mini-challenge. RuPaul then reveals the main challenge, which tasks the contestants with teaming up and performing in free-style floor performances including Fanography, Voguing, and Shablam. As the winners of the mini-challenge, A'keria C. Davenport and Plastique Tiara are captains and select their teammates. Team Glamazonia includes Nina West, Plastique Tiara, Ra'Jah O'Hara, Scarlet Envy, and Vanessa Vanjie Mateo. Team Tuckpanistan includes A'keria C. Davenport, Brooke Lynn Hytes, Shuga Cain, Silky Nutmeg Ganache, and Yvie Oddly. Before leaving, RuPaul reveals that the contestants will be working with dancer and choreographer Travis Wall as well as guest judge Adam Rippon.

The two teams start to practice in the Werk Room, then rehearse with Rippon and Wall on the main stage. Yvie Oddly experiences pain in her joints, preventing her from being able to perform to her fullest potential. On elimination day, the contestants make final preparations in the Werk Room for the performances and fashion show. Vanessa Vanjie Mateo shares that she is disappointed in how she has performed throughout the season thus far. Brooke Lynn Hytes talks about her experience with ballet. Yvie Oddly discusses her Ehlers–Danlos syndrome diagnosis.

On the main stage, RuPaul welcomes fellow judge Michelle Visage and guest judges Mirai Nagasu, Rippon, and Wall. RuPaul shares the assignment of the main challenge, then the free-style program commences with Rippon and Visage as commentators. Yvie Oddle injures her ankle during the program. RuPaul then shares the runway category ("All That Glitters"), then the fashion show commences. After the contestants present their looks, RuPaul announces that Team Tuckpanistan is the winning team and A'keria C. Davenport is the main challenge winner. After the judges deliver their critiques, RuPaul asks the contestants to say who they think should be eliminated from the competition and why. After the contestants give their answers, the judges deliberate, then share the results with the group. Nina West, Ra'Jah O'Hara, and Scarlet Envy receive negative critiques, and Nina West is deemed safe. Ra'Jah O'Hara and Scarlet Envy place in the bottom and face off in a lip-sync contest to "Last Dance" (1978) by Donna Summer. Ra'Jah O'Hara wins the lip-sync and Scarlet Envy is eliminated from the competition.

== Production and broadcast ==
The episode originally aired on April 4, 2019.

The two songs in the free-style program have clips of spoken word by RuPaul and former contestants on the show, including Alyssa Edwards, Laganja Estranja, Latrice Royale, and Valentina. Team Tuckpanistan performs to "Shade".

Michael Cuby of Nylon said that during the lip-sync contest, Scarlet Envy "let loose, literally cutting up the gold gown she had been wearing to reveal a perfectly-in-theme sequined jumpsuit that she proceeded to jump around the stage in, seemingly without a care in the world".

=== Fashion ===
For the main stage, RuPaul wears a gold dress and a blonde wig. For the fashion show, the contestants present gold outfits. A'keria C. Davenport has a gown and a large blonde wig. Brooke Lynn Hytes has a dress with a white boa and she carries a cigarette on a holder. Silky Nutmeg Ganache wears a jumpsuit and a red wig. She carries a gold hand fan. Yvie Oddly has a black-and-gold outfit with a headpiece. She walks with a gold cane and reveals her buttocks at the back of the stage. Shuga Cain wears an Aztec warrior-inspired outfit with a headpiece with large feathers. Plastique Tiara has large white wings and a gold headpiece with smaller wings. Ra'Jah O'Hara has a catsuit with a matching mask across her face. She has a short blonde wig. Vaness Vanjie Mateo has a corset and a face mask resembling rabbit ears. Nina West wears a viking-inspired outfit with a horned helmet and long blonde braids. Scarlet Envy has a gold dress and a long red wig.

== Reception ==
Kate Kulzick of The A.V. Club gave the episode a rating of 'B+'. Daniel Reynolds of The Advocate wrote, "While A'keria Davenport ended up winning the mini- and maxi-challenge of the Draglympics, Connie stole the spotlight as one of the most hilarious guests in recent Drag Race history." Sam Brooks ranked the "Last Dance" performance number 114 in The Spinoff's 2019 "definitive ranking" of the show's 162 lip-sync contests to date.
