= From Farm to Runway =

- RuPaul's Drag Race episode
- Episode no.: Season 11; Episode 7
- Original air date: April 11, 2019

Guest appearances
- Kandi Burruss (guest judge); Amber Valletta (guest judge); Alyssa Edwards

Episode chronology
← Previous "The Draglympics"	Next → "Snatch Game at Sea"
- RuPaul's Drag Race season 11

"From Farm to Runway" is the seventh episode of the eleventh season of the American reality competition television series RuPaul's Drag Race. It originally aired on April 11, 2019. The episode's main challenge tasks the contestants with creating an outfit made from organic materials. Kandi Burruss and Amber Valletta are guest judges.

Plastique Tiara wins the main challenge. Ra'Jah O'Hara is eliminated from the competition after placing in the bottom and losing a lip-sync contest against A'keria C. Davenport to "Strut" by Sheena Easton.

== Episode ==
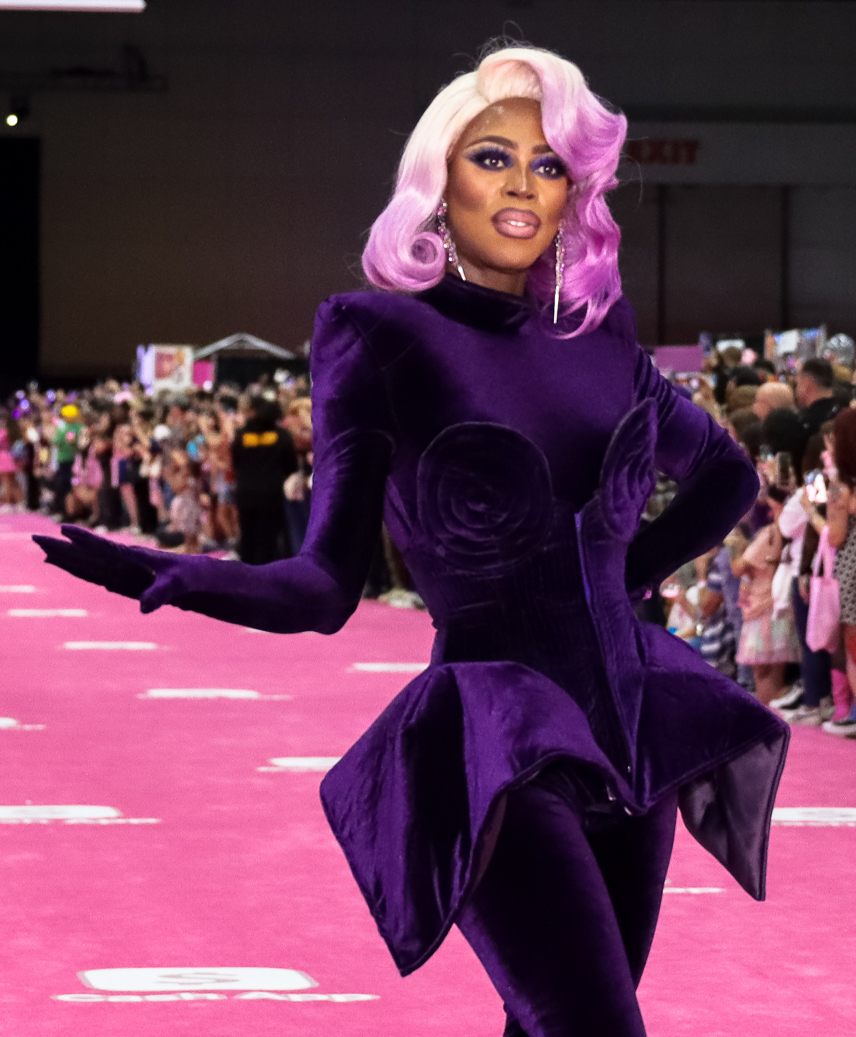
Ra'Jah O'Hara (pictured in 2023) is eliminated from the competition.

The contestants return to the Werk Room after Scarlet Envy's elimination on the previous episode. For the episode's mini-challenge, the contestants participate in a potato sack race serving "boob-ography". Nina West and Shuga Cain win the mini-challenge.

For the main challenge, the contestants are tasked with creating an outfit made from organic materials. Kandi Burruss and Amber Valletta are guest judges. The run way category is "Farm to Runway". Brooke Lynn Hytes, Plastique Tiara, and Yvie Oddly receive positive critiques, and Plastique Tiara wins the challenge. A'keria C. Davenport, Ra'Jah O'Hara, and Nina West receive negative critiques, and Nina West is deemed safe. A'keria C. Davenport and Ra'Jah O'Hara place in the bottom and face off in a lip-sync to "Strut" (1984) by Sheena Easton. A'keria C. Davenport wins the lip-sync and Ra'Jah O'Hara is eliminated from the competition.

== Production and broadcast ==
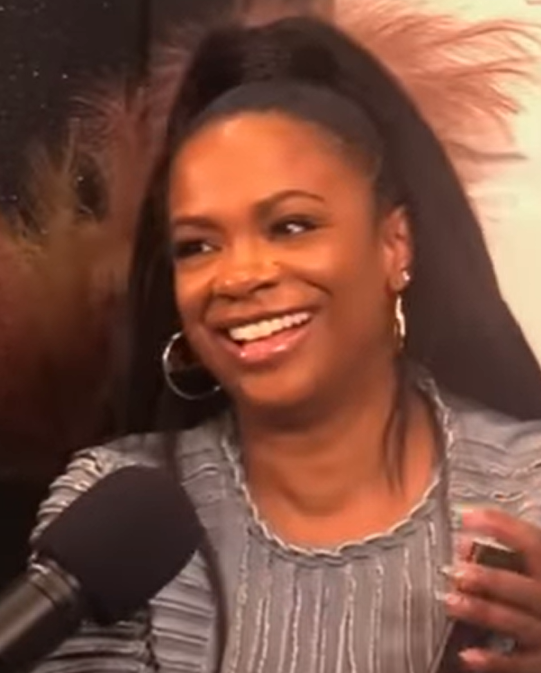
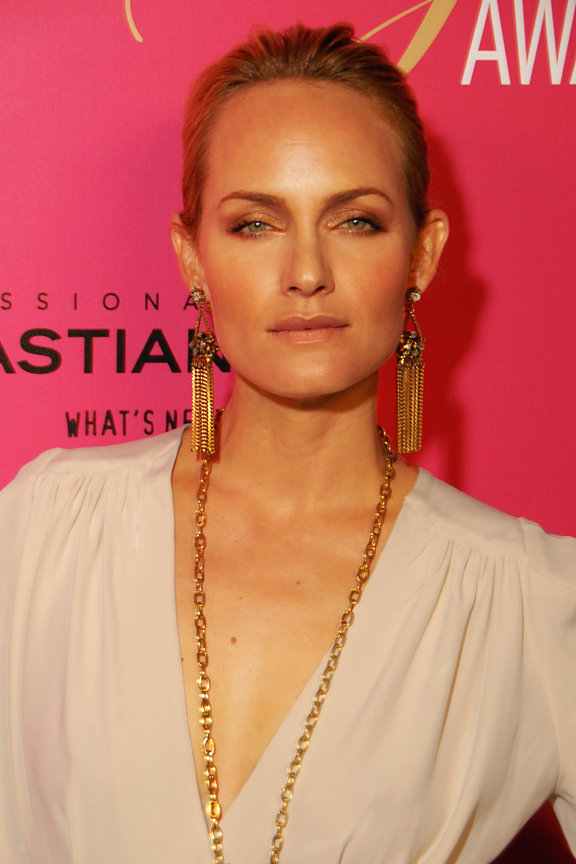
Kandi Burruss (left, pictured in 2023) and Amber Valletta (right, pictured in 2009) are guest judges.

The episode originally aired on April 11, 2019. Ariel Versace, Honey Davenport, and Scarlet Envy shared on social media the looks they would have presented had they still been in the competition for this episode.

=== Fashion ===
Nina West made an outfit from corn husks.

== Reception ==
Writing for Vulture, Matt Rogers rated the episode three out of five stars. In 2019, Joey Nolfi of Entertainment Weekly said A'keria C. Davenport's outfit "registered as a clear-cut mess of misshapen denim from head to toe that I'm affectionately dubbing a Canadian tuxed-oh-no-she-betta-don't".

Screen Rant included Yvie Oddly's look in a 2021 overview of the show's ten best "drag on a dime" runway looks, writing: "Season 11's eccentric queen showed their versatility when they constructed a glamorous look out of farm materials such as seeds, burlap, denim, food, and other miscellaneous items. Even though they didn't cinch the win, Yvie's awe-inspiring runway look was an underrated stunner of the challenge. The warm color choices with mix-ins of purple make the garment look like a beautiful sunset. The silhouette is distinct and interesting, making this outfit an eye-popping, bold fashion creation."
