= A'keria C. Davenport =

American drag performer (born 1988)

A'Keria Chanel Davenport
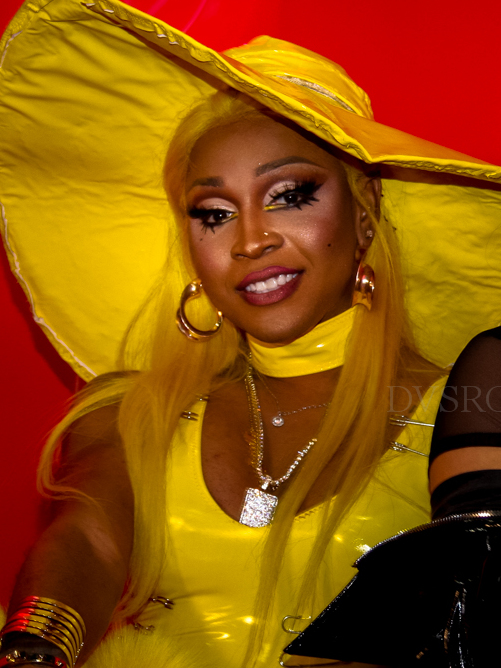
- A'Keria C. Davenport in 2019
- Born: Gregory D'Wayne; March 1, 1988 (age 38); Oak Cliff, Texas, U.S.
- Occupation: Drag queen
- Years active: 2011–present
- Known for: RuPaul's Drag Race (season 11) contestant RuPaul's Drag Race All Stars (season 6) contestant
- Website: theonlyakeria.com

A'Keria Chanel Davenport (born March 1, 1988) is the stage name of Gregory D'Wayne, an American drag queen best known for competing on the eleventh season of RuPaul's Drag Race (2019) and the sixth (2021) and eleventh (2026) seasons of RuPaul's Drag Race All Stars. As a professional entertainer, she has won several national titles in drag pageantry systems, including Miss Black Universe in 2017. Davenport was recognized by Dallas Voice as a Texan of the Year in 2019.

== Career ==
=== 2011–2018: Drag beginnings ===
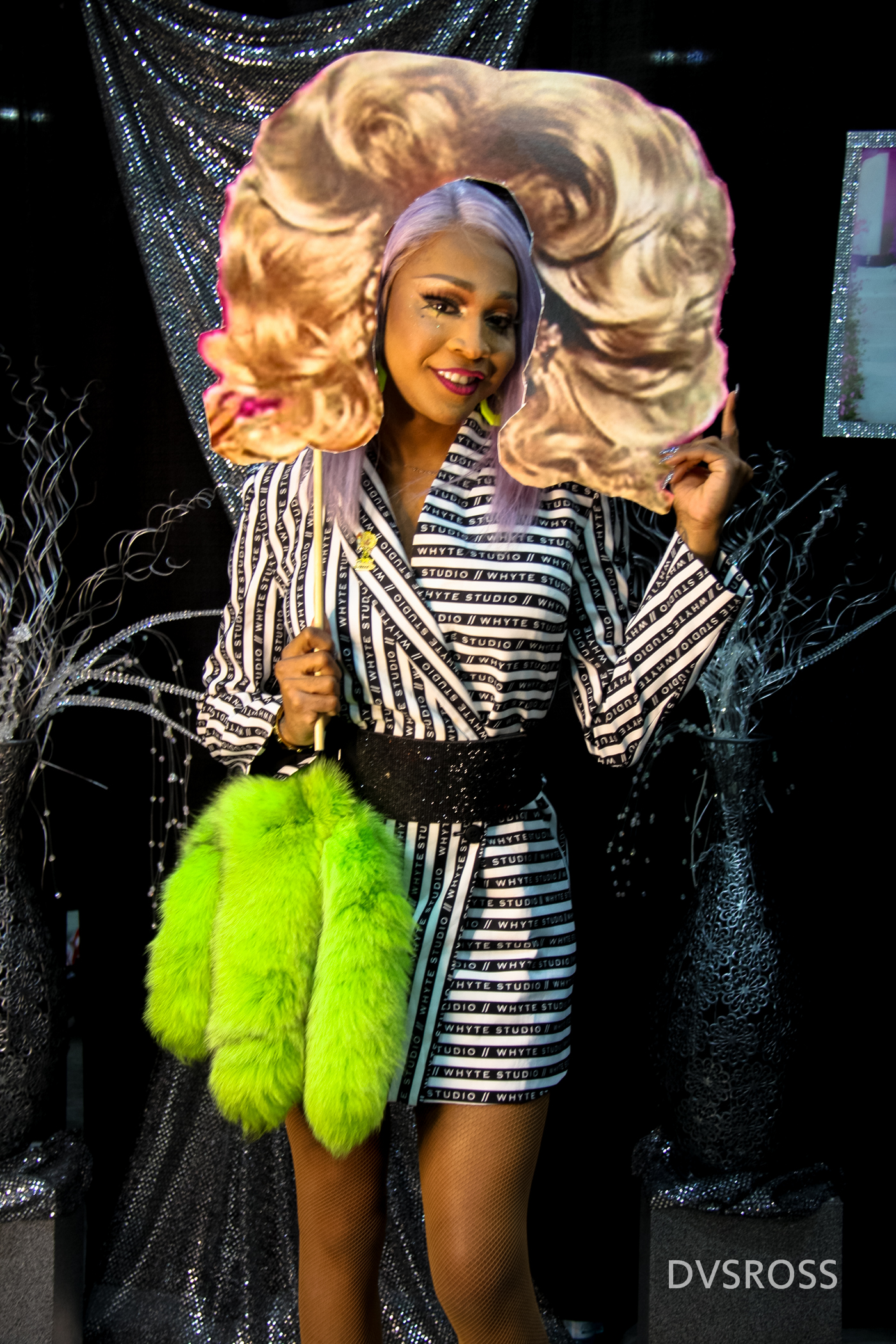
A'Keria Davenport, 2019

Davenport has been participating in drag pageants since 2011. Some of her titles include Miss Unity of America Newcomer 2011, Miss Wessland Newcomer 2012, Miss Diamond of the South Newcomer 2012, Miss International Vogue 2017 and Miss Black Universe 2017.

=== 2019–present: RuPaul's Drag Race ===
A'Keria was announced to be one of fifteen contestants competing on season eleven of RuPaul's Drag Race on January 24, 2019. In episode three, she was involved in the show's first ever six-way lip sync with Honey Davenport, Ra'Jah O'Hara, Plastique Tiara, Scarlet Envy and Shuga Cain, which she survived. She later lip synced again with Ra'Jah to Sheena Easton's "Strut" in episode seven. She won two main challenges, in episodes six and nine. She placed 3rd/4th alongside Silky Nutmeg Ganache after losing a lip sync against Yvie Oddly, who would eventually win the season against Brooke Lynn Hytes.

From March 26 to September 6, she was a part of the rotating cast for RuPaul's Drag Race: Season 11 Tour, presented by Voss Events and World of Wonder, and hosted by Asia O'Hara. The show kicked off in Los Angeles on May 26 during the RuPaul's DragCon LA wrap party (hosted by Drag Race judge Michelle Visage) and concluded with a final bow on September 6 in New York City (also hosted by Visage) at the top of RuPaul's DragCon NYC.

A'Keria was in the music video for Lizzo's "Juice" on April 17, 2019. She portrayed Nicki Minaj in the music video for Taylor Swift's "You Need to Calm Down" on June 17, 2019. On August 26, 2019, Davenport performed alongside Swift during her 2019 MTV Video Music Awards performance.

In April 2020, amid the coronavirus pandemic, Davenport was announced as a featured cast member for the very first Digital Drag Fest, an online drag festival for all ages, with attendees given opportunities to interact with the artists, tip them and win prizes during the broadcast.

On May 26, 2021, it was revealed that Davenport would be competing in the sixth season of RuPaul's Drag Race All Stars alongside 12 other contestants, including fellow season 11 contestants Ra'Jah O'Hara, Scarlet Envy and Silky Nutmeg Ganache. After landing in the bottom on episodes 3 and 4, she was later sent home by Kylie Sonique Love on the 6th episode "Rumerican Horror Story: Coven Girls" (a parody of American Horror Story) after placing in the bottom with Ra'Jah O'Hara.

In August 2021, they were a featured performer and host in Klub Kids London Presents: NOIR: The Tour, where 25% of the proceeds from the production were donated to the Black Lives Matter movement.

In April 2026, Davenport was confirmed to be competing on the eleventh season of RuPaul's Drag Race All Stars in the first bracket. Davenport's season 11 and All Stars season 6 castmate Silky Nutmeg Ganache and season 11 castmate Shuga Cain are also competing on the season.

== Personal life ==
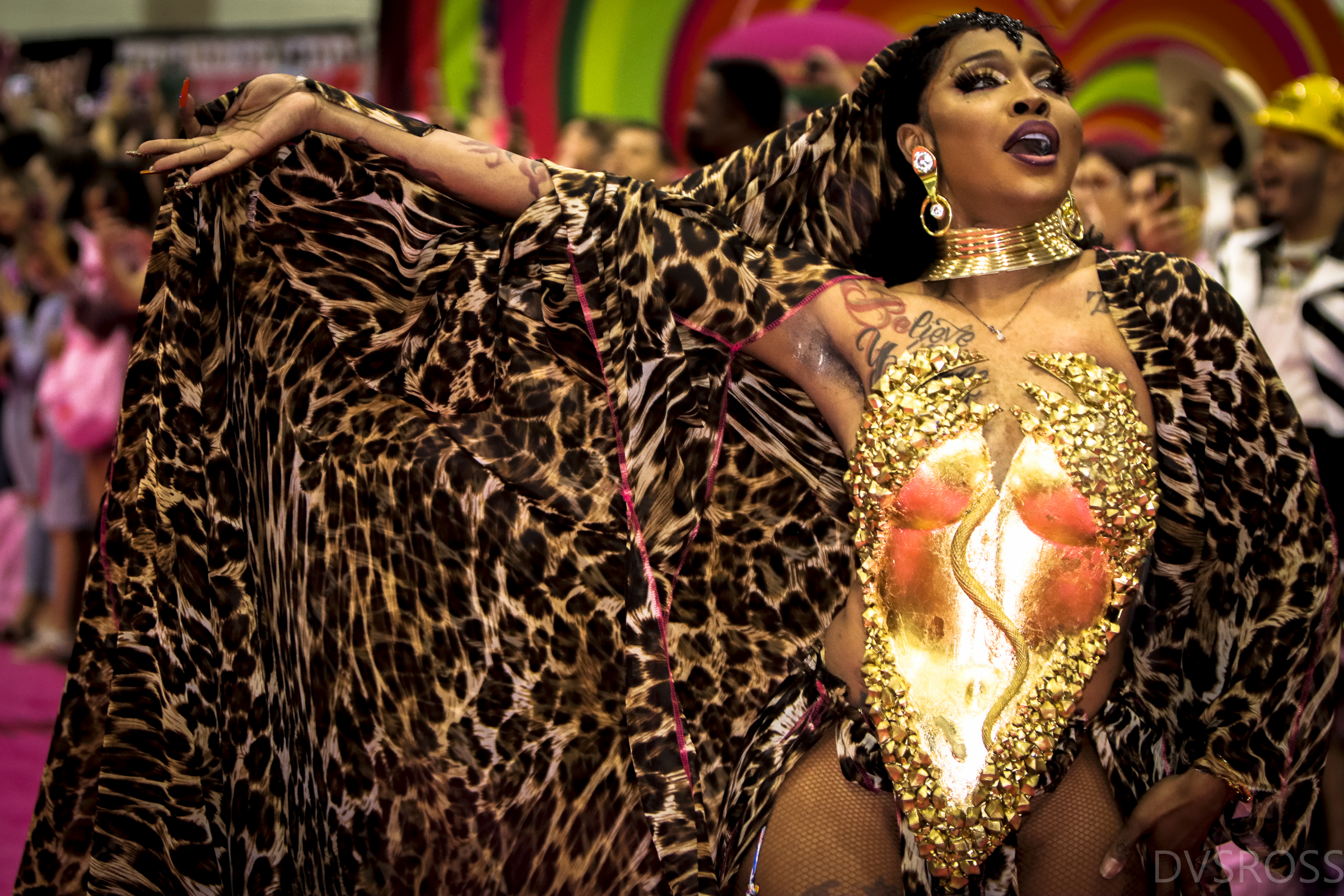
A'Keria Chanel Davenport at RuPaul's DragCon LA 2022

A'Keria C. Davenport is a member of the Drag Haus of Davenport, with Drag Race alum Kennedy Davenport, Sahara Davenport, Monét X Change, Honey Davenport and Ra'Jah O'Hara. Her drag mom is Armani Nicole Davenport. D'Wayne was living in Dallas before being cast on Drag Race. After Drag Race, D'Wayne moved to Katy. He has stated that he plans to create a skincare line as well as start a charity that will provide support for transgender women and homosexual youth.

D'Wayne spent almost a year of his life as a woman, until he realized he identified as a man. He opened up about this experience on the fifth episode of the sixth season of RuPaul's Drag Race All Stars, saying: "It took me to go through that experience to not only find myself but to know who I truly was and wanted to be to know I was enough... I faced the same obstacles most trans people ([especially] those of color) and that's why I will now and forever advocate and dedicate everything in me to protect them!"

Davenport went to David W. Carter High School in Wolf Creek, Texas and grew up in Oak Cliff, Texas.

== Filmography ==
=== Television ===
Year	Title	Role	Notes	Ref
2019	RuPaul's Drag Race (season 11)	Herself	Contestant (3rd/4th Place)	
2019	RuPaul's Drag Race: Untucked	Herself	Contestant (3rd/4th Place)	
2021	RuPaul's Drag Race All Stars (season 6)	Herself	Contestant (8th Place)	
2021	RuPaul's Drag Race All Stars: Untucked (season 3)	Herself	Contestant (8th Place)	
2026	RuPaul's Drag Race All Stars (season 11)	Herself	Contestant (5th/6th Place)	

=== Music videos ===
Year	Title	Artist	Ref
2019	"Juice"	Lizzo	
2019	"You Need to Calm Down"	Taylor Swift	

=== Web series ===
Year	Title	Role	Notes	Ref
2019	Queen to Queen	Herself	With Vanessa Mateo and Silky Nutmeg Ganache	
2019	Queen's Court	Herself	Guest	
2019	Countdown to the Crown	Herself	Season 11	
2019	Whatcha Packin'	Herself	Guest	
2019	Cosmo Queens	Herself	Cosmopolitan Series	
2019	Ca$tmate$ for Ca$h	Herself	Guest, with Brooke Lynn Hytes	
2021	Reality Check	Herself	Guest	
2021	Pageant Pod	Herself	Podcast; guest	
2021	Whatcha Packin'	Herself	Guest	
2021	Ruvealing the Look	Herself	Guest	
2021	Drag Us Weekly	Herself	Guest	
2022	The Pit Stop	Herself	Guest	

== Discography ==
=== Featured singles ===
Title	Year	Album
"Queens Everywhere – Cast Version" (RuPaul featuring Akeria C. Davenport, Brooke Lynn Hytes, Silky Nutmeg Ganache, Vanessa Vanjie Mateo, & Yvie Oddly)	2019	Non-album single

== Awards and nominations ==
Year	Award giving body	Category	Work	Results
2019	MTV Video Music Awards	Video of the Year	Taylor Swift's "You Need to Calm Down"	Won
