= Adam Rippon =

American figure skater (born 1989)

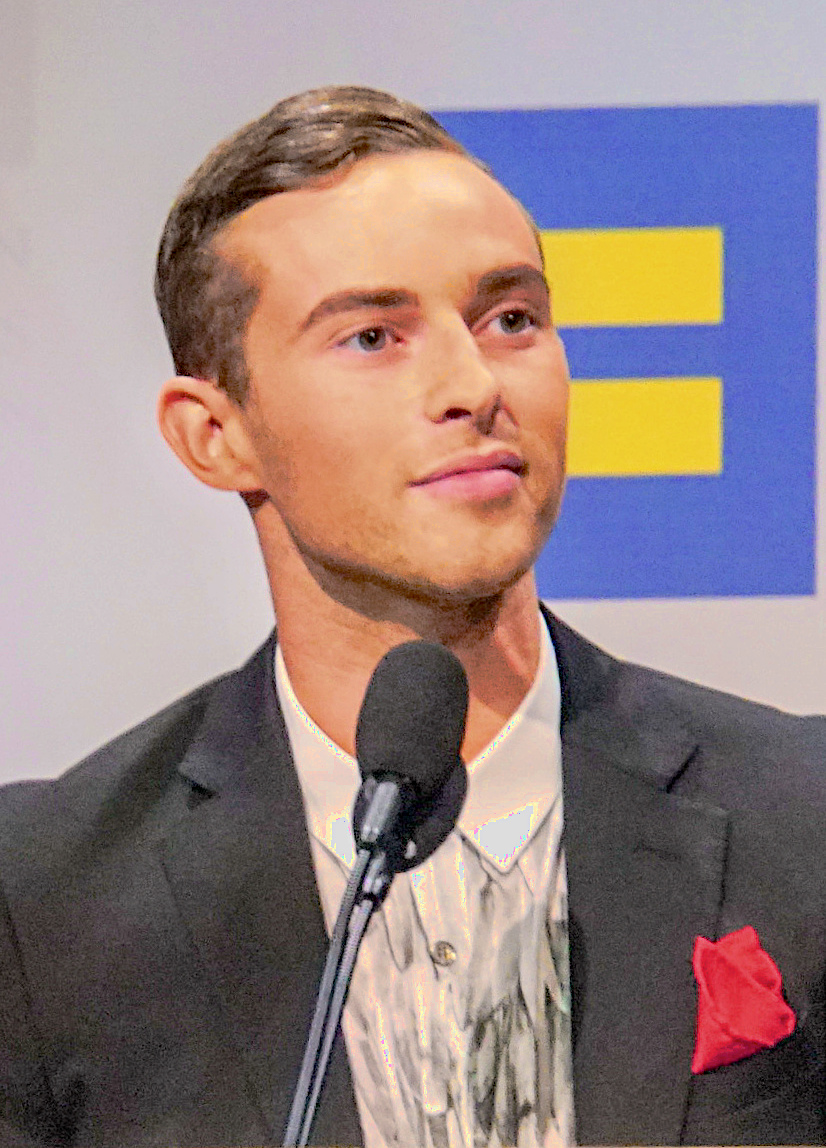
- Rippon at the 2018 Human Rights Campaign National Dinner
- Born: Adam Richard Rippon; November 11, 1989 (age 37); Scranton, Pennsylvania, U.S.
- Occupations: Figure skater; Media personality
- Height: 5 ft 7 in (1.70 m)
- Spouse: Jussi-Pekka Kajaala (m. 2021)
- Figure skating career
- Country: United States
- Discipline: Men's singles
- Began skating: 1999
- Competitive: 2004-18
- Retired: 2018
- Highest WS: 6th (2016–17)

Medal record
Olympic Games
Bronze medal – third place	2018 Pyeongchang	Team
Four Continents Championships
Gold medal – first place	2010 Jeonju	Singles
U.S. Championships
Gold medal – first place	2016 Saint Paul	Singles
Silver medal – second place	2012 San Jose	Singles
Silver medal – second place	2015 Greensboro	Singles
World Team Trophy
Silver medal – second place	2012 Tokyo	Team
World Junior Championships
Gold medal – first place	2008 Sofia	Singles
Gold medal – first place	2009 Sofia	Singles
Junior Grand Prix Final
Gold medal – first place	2007-08 Gdańsk	Singles

Adam Richard Rippon (born November 11, 1989) is a retired American competitive figure skater and media personality. He is the 2018 Olympic bronze medalist in the team event, the 2010 Four Continents Champion, and 2016 U.S. National Champion. Rippon competed at the 2018 Winter Olympics in Pyeongchang, South Korea, where he finished 10th. At the junior level, Rippon is a two-time Junior World Champion (2008, 2009), the 2007–2008 Junior Grand Prix Final Champion, and the 2008 U.S. junior national champion.

In 2018, Rippon became the first openly gay U.S. athlete to qualify for the Winter Olympics and the first openly gay U.S. athlete to win a medal at the Winter Games. Later that year, Rippon won season 26 of Dancing with the Stars with professional dancer Jenna Johnson. He guest-hosted RuPaul's Drag Race season 11 in 2019 ("The Draglympics"), starred in MTV's comedy series Messyness in 2021, and was the winner of the 2023 reality competition series Stars on Mars on Fox. Rippon joined NBC for the 2024 U.S. Figure Skating Championships, providing broadcast analysis alongside fellow figure skater and former training mate Ashley Wagner.

Rippon was named to the 2018 edition of Time Magazine's annual Time 100 list of the 100 most influential people. He released his memoir, Beautiful on the Outside, in October 2019.

== Early life ==
Adam Rippon was born on November 11, 1989, in Scranton, Pennsylvania, the first child in his family of six children. His parents divorced in 2004. He attended a Catholic elementary school, Our Lady of Peace.

== Career ==
=== Early career ===
Rippon started to skate when he was ten years old; his mother skated and brought him along to the rink. He was coached by Yelena Sergeeva from 2000 to 2007.

In the 2004–05 season, Rippon won the silver medal at the Novice level at the 2005 U.S. Championships. After nationals, he was assigned a spring international assignment, the Triglav Trophy in Slovenia 2005, and competed in the junior division, finishing first and winning the gold medal. In the 2005–06 season, he debuted on the ISU Junior Grand Prix circuit. He competed at the 2005–06 ISU Junior Grand Prix event in Croatia and placed 6th. At the 2006 U.S. Championships, he finished 11th at the junior level. In the 2006–2007 season, Rippon did not compete on the Junior Grand Prix circuit. He placed 6th on the junior level at the 2007 U.S. Championships. Following the event, he left Sergeeva and began working with Nikolai Morozov in February 2007 at the Ice House in Hackensack, New Jersey.

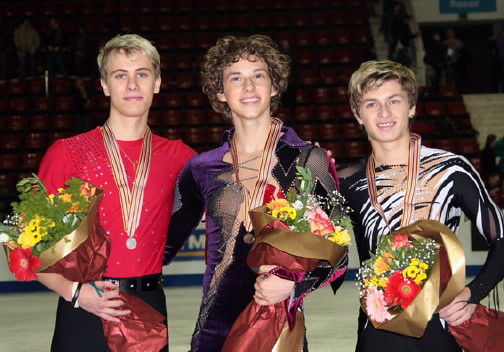
2009 World Junior Championships. From left: Michal Březina (2nd), Adam Rippon (1st), Artem Grigoriev (3rd)

=== 2007–08 season: Junior Grand Prix Final, U.S. Junior national, and World Junior champion ===
In the 2007–08 season, Rippon competed on the 2007–2008 ISU Junior Grand Prix circuit. At his first event, the Harghita Cup in Miercurea Ciuc, Romania, he won the gold medal. He then won the silver medal at the Sofia Cup in Sofia, Bulgaria. These two medals qualified him for the ISU Junior Grand Prix Final. At that event, Rippon won the gold medal, and became the first man to break 200 points at a Junior level competition.

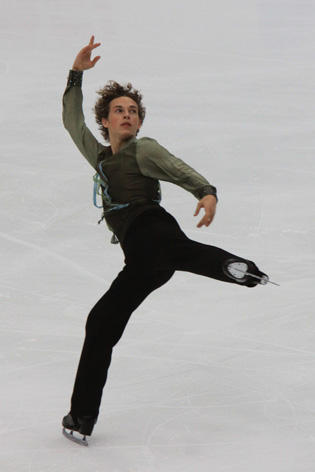
Adam performing at the 2009 NHK Trophy

He went on to the 2008 U.S. Championships, where he won the Junior title. The Professional Skaters Association recognized Rippon as having the best men's free skate at the National Championships and was awarded the EDI Award. He earned a trip to the 2008 Junior Worlds, where he won the gold medal after finishing first in both segments.

=== 2008–09 season: Senior international debut and second World Junior title ===
Rippon moved up to the senior level in the 2008–2009 season. In the Grand Prix season he was assigned to compete at the 2008 Skate America where he placed eighth and the 2008 Cup of Russia where he placed third in the short program and fifth overall. In late November 2008, Rippon left Morozov. In December 2008, he moved to Toronto, Ontario, Canada, to begin training with Brian Orser at the Toronto Cricket, Skating & Curling Club. Rippon officially announced his coaching change on January 2, 2009.

At the 2009 U.S. Championships, his senior-level national debut, he placed seventh. He was named to the team for the 2009 Junior World Championships. At Junior Worlds, in his two programs, he landed a total of three 3A jumps, one in combination with a 2T. He won the competition, scoring 222.00 points and becoming the first single skater to win two World Junior titles.

=== 2009–10 season ===
Rippon sprained his ankle during the summer and missed some training time. For the 2009–10 season, Rippon was assigned to two Grand Prix events. At the 2009 Trophée Eric Bompard, he placed third in both segments of the competition and was awarded the bronze medal. At the 2009 NHK Trophy, he finished 6th after placing 8th in the short and 5th in the free.

At the 2010 U.S. Championships, Rippon finished 5th overall after ranking 4th in both segments. He had a fall on his step sequence in the short program. Following the event, he was named as a second alternate for the 2010 Winter Olympics and 2010 World Championships, and assigned to the 2010 Four Continents Championships. At Four Continents, he placed 7th in the short program and first in the free skate, winning the gold medal. He was included in the U.S. team to Worlds after other skaters withdrew; he placed 7th in the short program, 5th in the free skate, and 6th overall.

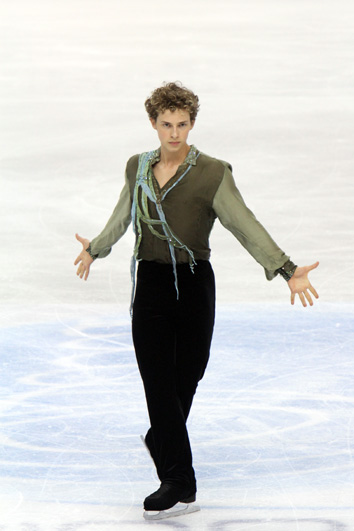
Adam at the 2010 World Figure Skating Championships

=== 2010–11 season: Four Continents champion ===
Rippon began his season at the Japan Open, where he finished ahead of Daisuke Takahashi and Evgeni Plushenko. His assigned Grand Prix events for the 2010–11 ISU Grand Prix season were the 2010 Skate Canada International and the 2010 Skate America. In Canada, Rippon had a collision with Patrick Chan during the morning practice before the short program but stated, "That was definitely the most exciting collision, maybe not the most dangerous." He won the bronze medal after placing third in the short and second in the free skate. At the 2010 Skate America, Rippon placed third in the short program, 7th in the free skate, and 4th overall.

At the 2011 U.S. Championships, Rippon finished 5th and was assigned to the 2011 Four Continents Championships, where he had the same result.

On June 16, 2011, Rippon announced he was leaving Canada and returning to train in the US at the Detroit Skating Club in Bloomfield Hills, Michigan, home of his DSC-based choreographer Pasquale Camerlengo and began training under the charge of Jason Dungjen.

=== 2011–12 season: U.S. national silver ===
In the 2011–12 season, Rippon was assigned to 2011 Skate Canada and 2011 Trophée Eric Bompard as his Grand Prix events. He opened the season with a 4th-place finish at Skate Canada. This competition marked Rippon's first attempt at including a quad jump in his free program. At Trophée Bompard, he was 4th in the short program, 3rd in the long, and finished 4th overall. Rippon won the silver medal at the 2012 U.S. Championships. He finished 4th at Four Continents and 13th at Worlds.

=== 2012–13 season ===
In September 2012, Rippon announced a coaching change, moving to train with Rafael Arutyunyan in Lake Arrowhead, California. At the 2012 Cup of China, Rippon collided with China's Song Nan – who sustained a concussion and withdrew – a minute into the final warm up before the free skate. Rippon said, "I kind of turned around to go into a jump and I think when Nan Song and I saw each other we both tried to avoid each other, but we went in the same way and we went head first into each other." Rippon finished 4th at the event and 8th at the 2012 NHK Trophy. At the 2013 U.S. Championships, he landed three triple Axels and finished 5th. He was assigned to the 2013 Four Continents but withdrew after sustaining an ankle injury on February 2, 2013.

=== 2013–14 season ===
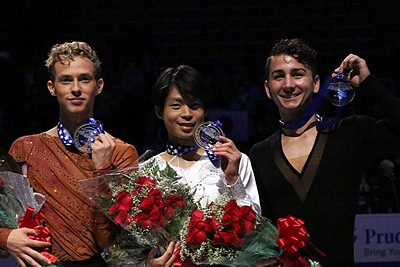
2013 Skate America From left: Adam Rippon(2nd); Tatsuki Machida(1st); Max Aaron(3rd).

In October 2013, Rippon competed at the 2013 Skate America. He included a quadruple Lutz in both his short and long programs. He set personal bests in both segments, capturing the silver medal and finishing as the top American over Max Aaron and Jason Brown. In November he competed for the NHK Trophy and posted a new ISU personal best in the short program 82.25. He landed a quadruple toe loop in both segments and finished fourth overall. Rippon had a disappointing result at the 2014 U.S Championships, placing 6th in the short program and 7th in the free skate, finishing 8th overall in his worst ever performance at a senior national event. As a result, Rippon failed to qualify for the 2014 Olympic team.

=== 2014–15 season ===
In October 2014, Rippon competed at the 2014 CS Finlandia Trophy finishing first in the free program and second overall. At the end of October he finished 7th in the free skate and 10th overall at the 2014 Skate Canada International. In November he finished 5th at the 2014 Trophee Eric Bompard after placing third in the free skate. Rippon adjusted his blade brand and mount, took on a new trainer to work with his team and met with renewed consistency at U.S. Championships, landing effortless triple Axels and once again including a quadruple Lutz in his short and long programs. He went on to win the free skate portion of the competition and finished second overall with the silver medal. He was assigned to both the Four Continents team and the Worlds team.

=== 2015–16 season: U.S. national champion ===
Rippon started the season at the 2015 Finlandia Trophy, where he finished second overall and won the free skate. His Grand Prix season started at Skate Canada, where he finished fourth overall (third in the short program and fifth in the free skate). His second event was the Rostelecom Cup in Russia, where he also finished in fourth place (sixth in the short program, but second in the free skate). In an episode of Rippon's podcast The Runthrough Rippon recounted that he initially finished in third overall behind Javier Fernandez and Adian Pitkeev, but shortly before the medal ceremony it was discovered that a spin of teammate Ross Miner had been mis-leveled, and it was Miner who narrowly beat Rippon for the bronze medal. At age 26, Rippon won gold at the 2016 U.S. Championships. When interviewed by Andrea Joyce, Rippon famously said "I'm like a witch and you can't kill me. I keep coming back every year, and every year I keep getting better." He placed sixth at the 2016 World Championships in Boston with a fantastic fourth place free program to a medley of Beatles tunes. The audience gave him a standing ovation.

=== 2016–17 season: Grand Prix Final debut ===
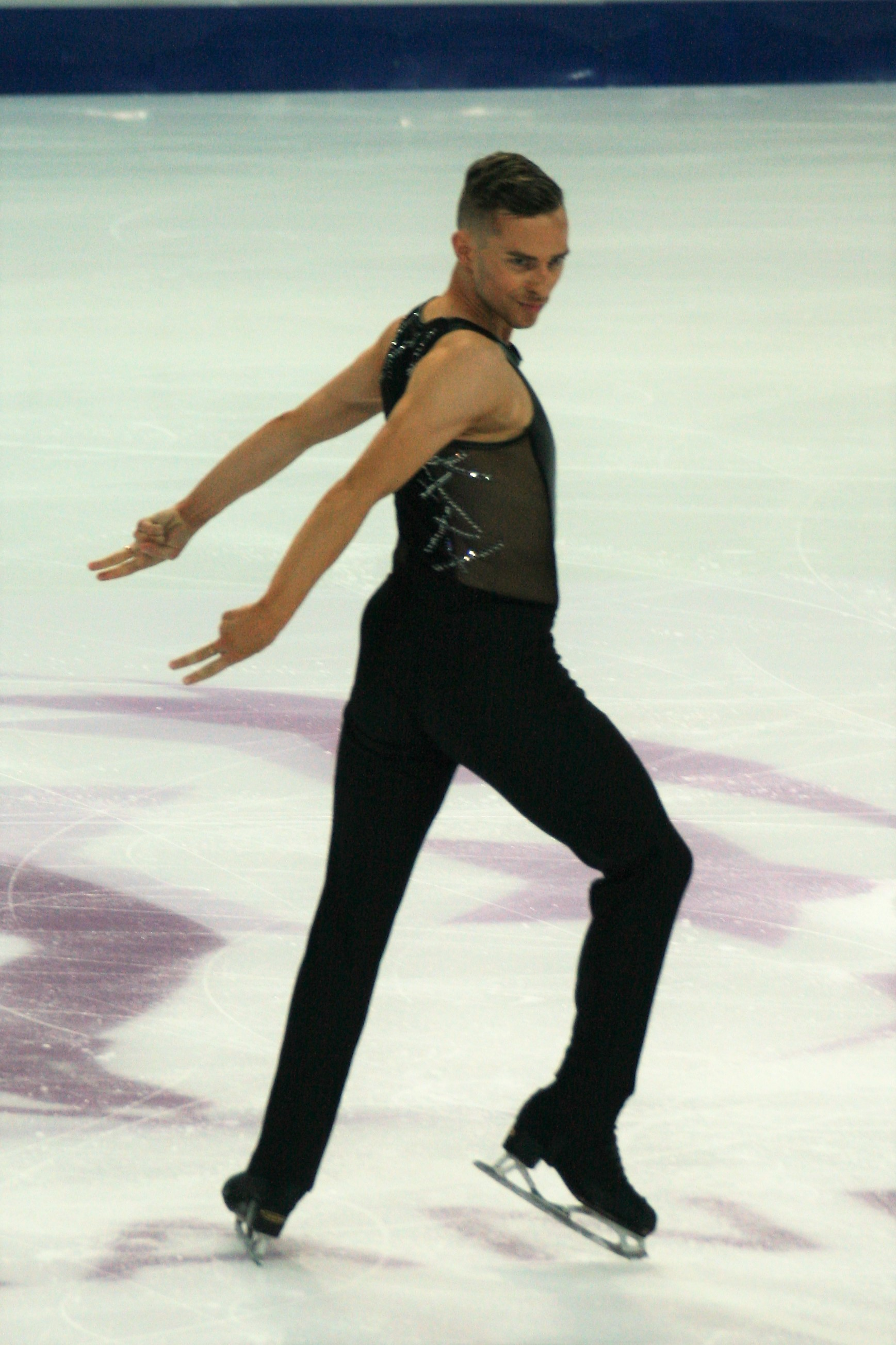
Rippon at the 2016–2017 Grand Prix Final

After taking bronze at the 2016 CS U.S. Classic, Rippon won bronze at the 2016 Skate America after placing 2nd in the free skate and 3rd in the short program. At the 2016 Trophée de France, Rippon won a second bronze medal after placing 4th in the short program and 2nd in the free skate, earning personal best scores for both the free skate and total score. He later described his free skate performance as "the best skate of my career." As a result, he qualified for the first time to the Grand Prix Final. He would finish 6th at the event in Marseille, France.

During an off-ice warmup on January 6, 2017, Rippon sprained his left ankle and fractured the fifth metatarsal bone in his left foot, resulting in his withdrawal from the 2017 U.S. Championships.

=== 2017–18 season: Pyeongchang Olympics ===
Starting his season strong with a bronze medal at 2017 CS Finlandia Trophy, Rippon then went on to win silver medals in both of his Grand Prix assignments, 2017 NHK Trophy and 2017 Skate America. His placements at these events qualified him for his second Grand Prix Final. During his free skate at Skate America, Rippon fell on his shoulder while executing a quadruple Lutz, but he was able to continue with his performance without stopping. At the 2018 U.S. Championships, Rippon placed 4th. On January 7, 2018, he was one of three men selected to represent Team USA at the 2018 Winter Olympics in Pyeongchang, South Korea. At the 2018 Winter Olympics, Rippon won a bronze medal in the figure skating team event as part of the U.S. team, which made him the United States' first openly gay athlete to win a medal at the Winter Olympics; previously that year he had become the first openly gay U.S. athlete to qualify for the Winter Olympics. In the individual men's event, he placed 7th in the short program and 10th in the free skate to finish 10th overall.

On November 19, 2018, Rippon announced his retirement from competitive figure skating.

== Post-competitive career ==
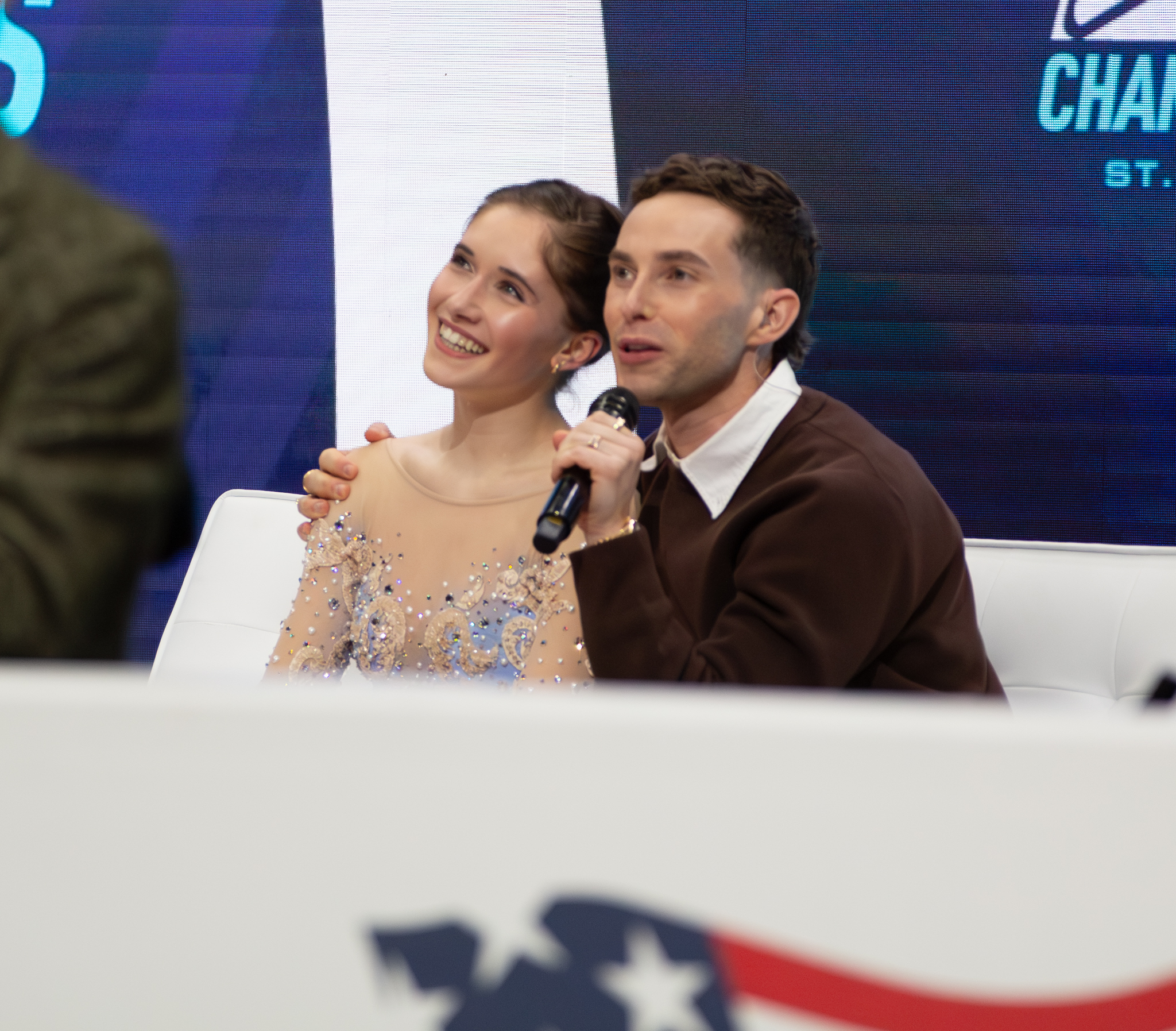
Rippon interviewing Isabeau Levito at the 2026 U.S. Championships

Following his retirement from competitive figure skating, Rippon began working as a coach and choreographer.

In 2019 Rippon received star billing in a music video by the group Superfruit. The group covered the song "The Promise."

In 2023, he began a figure skating podcast, titled "The Runthrough," which he hosts alongside Ashley Wagner and their friend Sarah Hughes (not to be confused with 2002 Olympic Champion Sarah Hughes). In addition, he has also done figure skating commentary.

== Dancing with the Stars ==
On April 13, 2018, Rippon was announced as one of the celebrities who would compete on season 26 of Dancing with the Stars. His professional partner was Jenna Johnson. They won the competition.

Adam Rippon - Dancing with the Stars (season 26)
Week	Dance	Music	Judges' scores (Note: Individual judges' scores are listed in the following order: Carrie Ann Inaba, Len Goodman, Bruno Tonioli.)			Total score	Result
1	Cha-cha-cha	"Sissy That Walk" — RuPaul	8	8	8	24	Safe
2	Quickstep	"Make Way" — Aloe Blacc	9	9	10	37 (Note: Adam also received a score of 9 from guest judge Rashad Jennings.)	Safe
2	Freestyle (Team 1970s Football)	"Instant Replay" — Dan Hartman	9	9	9	37 (Note: Adam's team also received a score of 10 from guest judge Rashad Jennings.)	Safe
3	Contemporary	"O" — Coldplay	10	9	10	39 (Note: Adam also received a score of 10 from guest judge David Ross.)	Safe
3	Jive (Dance-off)	"Johnny B. Goode" — Chuck Berry	Winner			2 (Note: Adam received two bonus points for winning this dance-off.)	Safe
4	Jazz	"Anything You Can Do" — Bernadette Peters & Tom Wopat	10	10	10	30	Winner
4	Freestyle	"Scooby Doo Pa Pa" — DJ Kass	9	9	10	28	Winner

== Signature moves ==
Rippon's signature move is a triple Lutz that he executes with both arms above his head, colloquially dubbed the "Rippon Lutz". He is capable of performing the triple Lutz/double toe loop/double loop jump combination with one hand over his head in all three jumps (colloquially named the "'Tano Lutz" after Brian Boitano, who popularized the move).

== Personal life ==
On October 2, 2015, Rippon publicly came out as gay. In his memoir Beautiful on the Outside, Rippon revealed that, before coming out as gay, he briefly dated South Korean Olympic champion Yuna Kim while both were training in Toronto. Rippon and his husband, Jussi-Pekka Kajaala, were married on December 31, 2021. The two met on Tinder in 2018.

At the Time 100 Gala in April 2019, Rippon honored his mother, a single parent, for her inspiration and dedication to his success. He reminded people that success is not overnight: It requires dedication and the support of others. In addition to his mother, Kelly, he has a close relationship with his siblings.

In 2019, Rippon guest-hosted RuPaul's Drag Race season 11 "Ruveal" livestreams with reigning queen from season 10, Aquaria. Also in 2019, Rippon appeared in Taylor Swift's "You Need to Calm Down" music video, which won the MTV Video Music Award for Video of the Year. He also appeared in Superfruit's "The Promise" music video.

=== Politics ===
In February 2018, Rippon raised concerns about then-Vice President Mike Pence being chosen to lead the US delegation to the 2018 Winter Olympics opening ceremony because of Pence's support of legislation and policies deemed hostile to gay people.

Rippon endorsed and campaigned for Elizabeth Warren in the 2020 Democratic Party presidential primaries.

In 2020, Rippon made a donation to The Okra Project, a charity aimed at helping underprivileged black transgender people. Russian skater Alexei Yagudin reacted to the donation with an Instagram post calling Rippon and people like him "mistakes of nature" and wishing them to die. Yagudin later deleted the post. Rippon criticized Yagudin for the comments and made another $1,000 donation, this time in Yagudin's name, to the same organization.

In 2022, Rippon criticized the International Olympic Committee for selecting Beijing as the host city of the 2022 Winter Olympics. The athlete said that the IOC was rewarding China's human rights abuses instead of choosing hosting countries that are safe for all athletes to compete.

== Programs ==
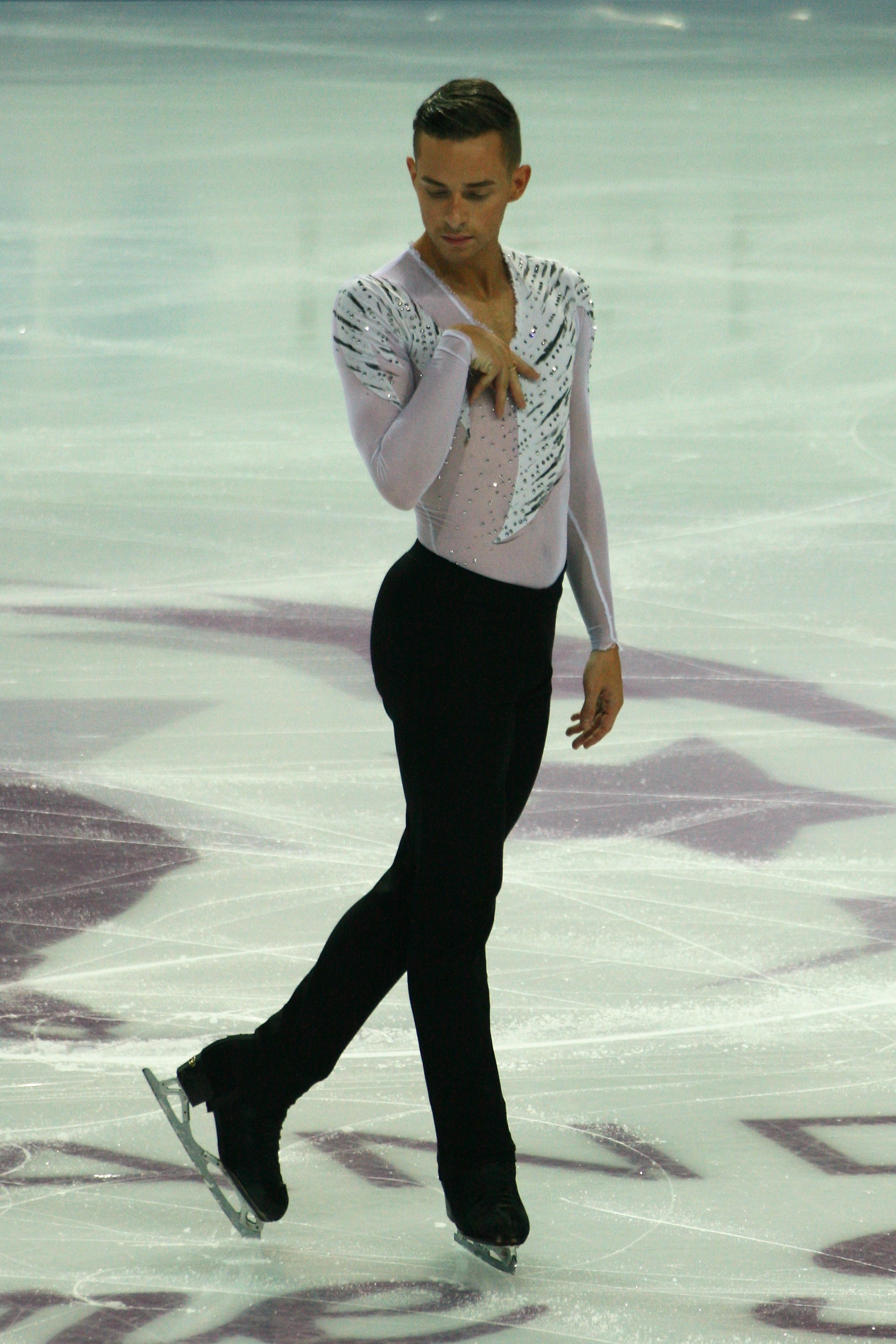
Rippon at the 2016–2017 Grand Prix Final

Season	Short program	Free skate	Exhibition	Ref.
2002–03		Fantaisie Impromptu Op.66 By Frédéric Chopin Choreo. by Yelena Sergeeva	—N/a	
2003–04	"Winter" From The Four Seasons By Antonio Vivaldi Choreo. by Yelena Sergeeva	Hungarian Rhapsodies By Franz Liszt Choreo. by Yelena Sergeeva	—N/a	
2004–05	Introduction and Rondo Capriccioso By Camille Saint-Saëns Choreo. by Yelena Sergeeva	Don Quixote By Ludwig Minkus Choreo. by Yelena Sergeeva	—N/a	
2005–06	"Just for You" By Giovanni Choreo. by Yelena Segeeva	Croatian Rhapsody; Wonderland By Maksim Mrvica; Whisper from the Mirror By Keiko Matsui Choreo. by Yelena Sergeeva	—N/a	
2006–07	Masquerade Waltz By Aram Khachaturian Choreo. by Yelena Sergeeva	The Nutcracker By Pyotr Ilyich Tchaikovsky Choreo. by Yelena Sergeeva	"Because We Believe" By Andrea Bocelli Choreo. by Adam Rippon	
2007–08	Toccata and Fugue in D minor By Johann Sebastian Bach Choreo. by Nikolai Morozov	"Moonlight Sonata" By Ludwig van Beethoven Choreo. by Nikolai Morozov	"I'll Still be Diggin' On James Brown" By Tubes in Town Choreo. by Nikolai Morozov	
2007–08	Toccata and Fugue in D minor By Johann Sebastian Bach Choreo. by Nikolai Morozov	"Moonlight Sonata" By Ludwig van Beethoven Choreo. by Nikolai Morozov	Pagliacci By Ruggero Leoncavallo Choreo. by Nikolai Morozov	
2008–09	Toccata and Fugue in D minor By Johann Sebastian Bach Choreo. by Nikolai Morozov	"Send In the Clowns" From A Little Night Music By Stephen Sondheim; Pagliacci By Ruggero Leoncavallo Choreo. by Adam Rippon	"Make You Feel My Love" By Jon Peter Lewis Choreo. by Adam Rippon	
2008–09	Toccata and Fugue in D minor By Johann Sebastian Bach Choreo. by Nikolai Morozov	"Send In the Clowns" From A Little Night Music By Stephen Sondheim; Pagliacci By Ruggero Leoncavallo Choreo. by Adam Rippon	"Desperado" By Westlife Choreo. by Olga Orlova & David Wilson	
2008–09	Toccata and Fugue in D minor By Johann Sebastian Bach Choreo. by Nikolai Morozov	"Send In the Clowns" From A Little Night Music By Stephen Sondheim; Pagliacci By Ruggero Leoncavallo Choreo. by Adam Rippon	"I'm Yours" By Jason Mraz Choreo. by David Wilson	
2009–10	"Jonathan Livingston Seagull" By Neil Diamond Choreo. by David Wilson	Concerto for Violin and Orchestra By Samuel Barber Choreo. by David Wilson	"I'm Yours" By Jason Mraz Choreo. by David Wilson	
2009–10	"Jonathan Livingston Seagull" By Neil Diamond Choreo. by David Wilson	Concerto for Violin and Orchestra By Samuel Barber Choreo. by David Wilson	"Are You Gonna Be My Girl" By Jet Choreo. by David Wilson	
2010–11	Romeo and Juliet By Pyotr Ilyich Tchaikovsky Choreo. by David Wilson & Sébastien Britten	Piano Concerto No. 2 By Sergei Rachmaninoff Choreo. by David Wilson	Love Theme from Cinema Paradiso By Ennio Morricone Performed by Itzhak Perlman Choreo. by Molly Oberstar & Adam Rippon	
2010–11	Romeo and Juliet By Pyotr Ilyich Tchaikovsky Choreo. by David Wilson & Sébastien Britten	Piano Concerto No. 2 By Sergei Rachmaninoff Choreo. by David Wilson	"Are You Gonna Be My Girl"	
2010–11	Romeo and Juliet By Pyotr Ilyich Tchaikovsky Choreo. by David Wilson & Sébastien Britten	Piano Concerto No. 2 By Sergei Rachmaninoff Choreo. by David Wilson	"I'm Yours"	
2011–12	"Korobushko" By Bond Choreo. by Shae-Lynn Bourne	Air; Toccata and Fugue in D minor Choreo. by Pasquale Camerlengo	Piano Concerto No. 2 Choreo. by Adam Rippon	
2012–13	"Nessun dorma" By Giacomo Puccini Choreo. by Rafael Arutyunyan	The Incredibles; 1. "Life's Incredible Again"; 2. "Saving Metroville" By Michael Giacchino Choreo. by Rafael Arutyunyan & Michael Seibert	"After Tonight" By Justin Nozuka Choreo. by Adam Rippon	
2013–14	Carmen Suite By Rodion Shchedrin after Bizet Choreo. by Cindy Stuart	Prélude à l'après-midi d'un faune By Claude Debussy Choreo. by Tom Dickson	"A Song for You" By Leon Russell Choreo. by Adam Rippon	
2014–15	"Tuxedo Junction" Performed by Quincy Jones Choreo. by Catarina Lindgren	Piano Concerto No. 1 By Franz Liszt Choreo. by Tom Dickson	"After Tonight"	
2014–15	"Nyah" By Hans Zimmer Choreo. by Adam Rippon	Piano Concerto No. 1 By Franz Liszt Choreo. by Tom Dickson	"All Alone" by Geir Rönning Choreo. by Adam Rippon	
2015–16	"Who Wants to Live Forever" By Queen Choreo. by Tom Dickson	The Beatles medley: 1. "Because (The World is Round)"; 2. "Get Back"; 3. "Blackbird"; 4. "Sgt. Pepper's Lonely Hearts Club Band" Choreo. by Jeffrey Buttle	"Whole Lotta Love" By Led Zeppelin Choreo. by Tom Dickson	
2015–16	"Who Wants to Live Forever" By Queen Choreo. by Tom Dickson	The Beatles medley: 1. "Because (The World is Round)"; 2. "Get Back"; 3. "Blackbird"; 4. "Sgt. Pepper's Lonely Hearts Club Band" Choreo. by Jeffrey Buttle	"O (Fly On)" By Coldplay Choreo. by Benji Schwimmer	
2015–16	"Who Wants to Live Forever" By Queen Choreo. by Tom Dickson	The Beatles medley: 1. "Because (The World is Round)"; 2. "Get Back"; 3. "Blackbird"; 4. "Sgt. Pepper's Lonely Hearts Club Band" Choreo. by Jeffrey Buttle	The Beatles medley Choreo. by Jeffrey Buttle	
2016–17	"Let Me Think About It" (Eddie Thoneick Remix) By Ida Corr & Fedde Le Grand Choreo. by Jeffrey Buttle	"Bloodstream" By Stateless Choreo. by Benji Schwimmer	"My Funny Valentine"	
2016–17	"Let Me Think About It" (Eddie Thoneick Remix) By Ida Corr & Fedde Le Grand Choreo. by Jeffrey Buttle	"Arrival of the Birds" & "Exodus" From The Crimson Wing: Mystery of the Flamingos By The Cinematic Orchestra; "O (Fly On)"	"Diamonds" By Sia Furler, Benjamin Levin & Stargate Performed by Josef Salvat	
2016–17	"Let Me Think About It" (Eddie Thoneick Remix) By Ida Corr & Fedde Le Grand Choreo. by Jeffrey Buttle	"Arrival of the Birds" & "Exodus" From The Crimson Wing: Mystery of the Flamingos By The Cinematic Orchestra; "O (Fly On)"	"Getaway" By Tritonal, feat. Angel Taylor	
2017–18	"Diamonds" choreo. by Benji Schwimmer & Jeffrey Buttle	"Arrival of the Birds" & "Exodus"; "O (Fly On)"	"Diamonds" Performed by Adam Rippon	
2017–18	Advice of Tomorrow By Ciuju Nelabai; "Let Me Think About It" (Eddie Thoneick Remix)	"Arrival of the Birds" & "Exodus"; "O (Fly On)"	"Remedy" By Adele	
2017–18	Advice of Tomorrow By Ciuju Nelabai; "Let Me Think About It" (Eddie Thoneick Remix)	"Arrival of the Birds" & "Exodus"; "O (Fly On)"	"Let Me Think About It" (Eddie Thoneick Remix)	

== Competitive highlights ==
- GP – Event of the ISU Grand Prix Series
- JGP – Event of the ISU Junior Grand Prix Series
- CS – Event of the ISU Challenger Series
- WD – Withdrew from competition
- At national events in the United States, pewter medals are awarded for the fourth place.
- Medals at team events are awarded for the team results only. Individual placements at team events are listed in parentheses.

Competition placements at senior level
Season	2008–09	2009–10	2010–11	2011–12	2012–13	2013–14	2014–15	2015–16	2016–17	2017–18
Winter Olympics										10th
Winter Olympics (Team event)										3rd
World Championships		6th		13th			8th	6th		
Four Continents Championships		1st	5th	4th		8th	10th			
Grand Prix Final									6th	5th
U.S. Championships	7th	5th	5th	2nd	5th	8th	2nd	1st		4th
World Team Trophy				2nd (7th)						
GP Cup of China					4th					
GP France		3rd		4th			5th		3rd	
GP NHK Trophy		6th			8th	4th				2nd
GP Rostelecom Cup	5th							4th		
GP Skate America	8th		4th			2nd			3rd	2nd
GP Skate Canada			3rd	4th			10th	4th		
CS Finlandia Trophy							2nd	2nd		3rd
CS Golden Spin of Zagreb								2nd		
CS U.S. Classic									3rd	
Gardena Spring Trophy					2nd					
Japan Open			2nd (1st)						3rd (5th)	
Team Challenge Cup								1st (3rd)		

Competition placements at junior level
Season	2004–05	2005–06	2006–07	2007–08	2008–09
World Junior Championships				1st	1st
Junior Grand Prix Final				1st	
U.S. Championships		11th	6th	1st	
JGP Bulgaria				2nd	
JGP Croatia		6th			
JGP Romania				1st	
Triglav Trophy	1st				

== Detailed results ==
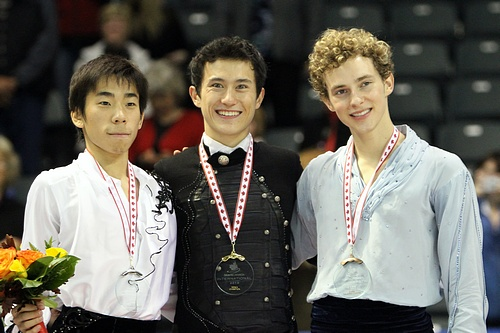
Rippon (right) at the 2010 Skate Canada International podium

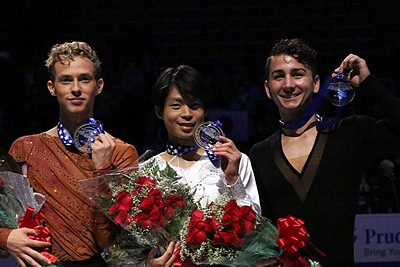
Rippon (left) at the 2013 Skate America podium

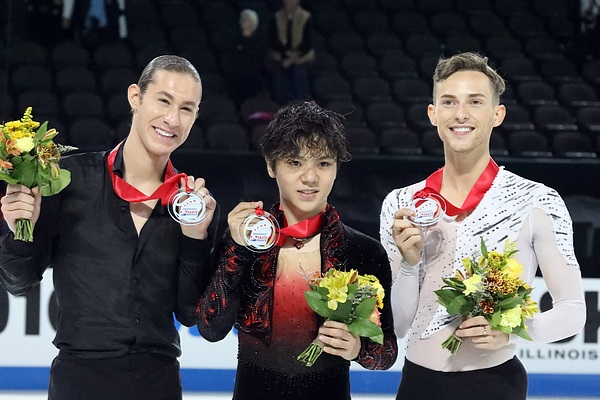
Rippon (right) at the 2016 Skate America podium

ISU personal best scores in the +3/-3 GOE System
Segment	Type	Score	Event
Total	TSS	267.53	2016 Trophée de France
Short program	TSS	89.04	2017 Skate America
Short program	TES	45.76	2016 CS U.S. International Classic
Short program	PCS	44.00	2017 Skate America
Free skating	TSS	182.28	2016 Trophée de France
Free skating	TES	94.64	2016 Trophée de France
Free skating	PCS	88.50	2017 Skate America

=== Senior level ===
- Small medals for the short program and free skating are only awarded at ISU Championships.
- At national events in the United States, pewter medals are awarded for fourth place.
- Medals at team events are awarded for the team results only. Individual placements at team events are listed in parentheses.

Results in the 2008–09 season
Date	Event	SP		FS		Total	
Date	Event	P	Score	P	Score	P	Score
Oct 23–26, 2008	(United States) 2008 Skate America	8	59.60	7	115.22	8	174.82
Nov 21–23, 2008	2008 Cup of Russia	3	71.62	5	136.31	5	207.93
Jan 18–25, 2009	(United States) 2009 U.S. Championships	12	62.22	6	131.54	7	193.76

Results in the 2009–10 season
Date	Event	SP		FS		Total	
Date	Event	P	Score	P	Score	P	Score
Oct 15–18, 2009	(France) 2009 Trophée Éric Bompard	3	75.82	3	144.14	3	219.96
Nov 5–8, 2009	(Japan) 2009 NHK Trophy	8	67.15	5	130.46	6	197.61
Jan 14–24, 2010	(United States) 2010 U.S. Championships	4	72.91	4	152.16	5	225.07
Jan 25–31, 2010	(South Korea) 2010 Four Continents Championships	7	69.56	1	156.22	1	225.78
Mar 22–28, 2010	(Italy) 2010 World Championships	7	80.11	5	151.36	6	231.47

Results in the 2010–11 season
Date	Event	SP		FS		Total	
Date	Event	P	Score	P	Score	P	Score
Oct 2, 2010	2010 Japan Open	–	–	1	166.63	2	–
Oct 28–31, 2010	2010 Skate Canada International	3	77.53	2	155.51	3	233.04
Nov 11–14, 2010	(United States) 2010 Skate America	3	73.94	7	129.18	4	203.12
Jan 22–30, 2011	(United States) 2011 U.S. Championships	9	66.26	3	153.78	5	220.04
Feb 15–20, 2011	(Taiwan) 2011 Four Continents Championships	4	72.71	5	137.30	5	210.01

Results in the 2011–12 season
Date	Event	SP		FS		Total	
Date	Event	P	Score	P	Score	P	Score
Oct 27–30, 2011	2011 Skate Canada International	4	72.89	4	145.08	4	217.97
Nov 18–20, 2011	(France) 2011 Trophée Éric Bompard	4	72.96	3	144.93	4	217.89
Jan 22–29, 2012	(United States) 2012 U.S. Championships	2	82.94	2	157.93	2	240.87
Feb 7–12, 2012	(United States) 2012 Four Continents Championships	7	74.92	3	146.63	4	221.55
Mar 26 – Apr 1, 2012	(France) 2012 World Championships	10	73.55	16	143.08	13	216.63
Apr 19–22, 2012	(Japan) 2012 ISU World Team Trophy	7	74.93	6	147.80	2 (7)	222.73

Results in the 2012–13 season
Date	Event	SP		FS		Total	
Date	Event	P	Score	P	Score	P	Score
Nov 2–4, 2012	2012 Cup of China	4	71.81	4	133.67	4	205.48
Nov 23–25, 2012	(Japan) 2012 NHK Trophy	8	67.89	8	142.58	8	210.47
Jan 17–19, 2012	(United States) 2013 U.S. Championships	6	76.65	6	153.22	5	229.87
Apr 1–3, 2013	(Italy) 2013 Gardena Spring Trophy	3	63.64	1	155.52	2	219.16

Results in the 2013–14 season
Date	Event	SP		FS		Total	
Date	Event	P	Score	P	Score	P	Score
Oct 18–20, 2013	(United States) 2013 Skate America	3	80.26	3	160.98	2	241.24
Nov 8–10, 2013	(Japan) 2013 NHK Trophy	4	82.25	4	151.46	4	233.71
Jan 5–12, 2014	(United States) 2014 U.S. Championships	6	77.58	7	144.61	8	222.19
Jan 20–26, 2014	(Taiwan) 2014 Four Continents Championships	8	72.90	8	140.30	8	213.20

Results in the 2014–15 season
Date	Event	SP		FS		Total	
Date	Event	P	Score	P	Score	P	Score
Oct 9–12, 2014	(Finland) 2014 Finlandia Trophy	3	68.53	1	152.22	2	220.75
Oct 31 – Nov 2, 2014	2014 Skate Canada International	11	62.83	7	139.09	10	201.92
Nov 21–23, 2014	(France) 2014 Trophée Éric Bompard	7	76.98	3	148.44	5	225.42
Jan 17–25, 2015	(United States) 2015 U.S. Championships	5	84.71	1	187.77	2	272.48
Feb 9–15, 2015	(South Korea) 2015 Four Continents Championships	12	68.37	10	143.93	10	212.30
Mar 23–29, 2015	(China) 2015 World Championships	11	75.14	8	154.57	8	229.71

Results in the 2015–16 season
Date	Event	SP		FS		Total	
Date	Event	P	Score	P	Score	P	Score
Oct 9–11, 2015	(Finland) 2015 Finlandia Trophy	3	69.29	1	154.89	2	224.18
Oct 30 – Nov 1, 2015	2015 Skate Canada International	3	80.36	5	159.33	4	239.69
Nov 20–22, 2015	(Russia) 2015 Rostelecom Cup	6	78.77	2	169.86	4	248.63
Dec 3–5, 2015	(Croatia) 2015 Golden Spin of Zagreb	3	72.23	2	165.64	2	237.87
Jan 16–24, 2016	(United States) 2016 U.S. Championships	3	88.01	1	182.74	1	270.75
Mar 28 – Apr 3, 2016	(United States) 2016 World Championships	7	85.72	4	178.72	6	264.44
Apr 22–24, 2016	(United States) 2016 Team Challenge Cup	5	86.05	3	166.68	1 (3)	252.73

Results in the 2016–17 season
Date	Event	SP		FS		Total	
Date	Event	P	Score	P	Score	P	Score
Sep 14–18, 2016	(United States) 2016 CS U.S. International Classic	1	87.86	3	160.38	3	248.24
Oct 1, 2016	2016 Japan Open	–	–	5	166.85	3	–
Oct 21–23, 2016	(United States) 2016 Skate America	2	87.32	3	174.11	3	261.43
Nov 11–13, 2016	2016 Trophée de France	4	85.25	2	182.28	3	267.53
Dec 8–11, 2016	(France) 2016–17 Grand Prix Final	6	83.93	6	149.17	6	233.10

Results in the 2017–18 season
Date	Event	SP		FS		Total	
Date	Event	P	Score	P	Score	P	Score
Oct 6–8, 2017	(Finland) 2017 CS Finlandia Trophy	3	83.69	2	166.19	3	249.88
Nov 10–12, 2017	(Japan) 2017 NHK Trophy	4	84.95	2	177.04	2	261.99
Nov 24–26, 2017	(United States) 2017 Skate America	2	89.04	1	177.41	2	266.45
Dec 7–10, 2017	(Japan) 2017–18 Grand Prix Final	6	86.19	5	168.14	5	254.33
Dec 29, 2017 – Jan 8, 2018	(United States) 2018 U.S. Championships	2	96.52	4	171.82	4	268.34
Feb 9–12, 2018	(South Korea) 2018 Winter Olympics (Team event)	–	–	3	172.98	3	–
Feb 16–17, 2018	(South Korea) 2018 Winter Olympics	7	87.95	10	171.41	10	259.36

=== Junior level ===
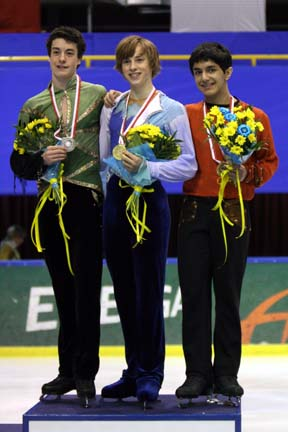
The men's podium at the 2007–08 ISU Junior Grand Prix Final. From left: Brandon Mroz (2nd), Adam Rippon (1st), Armin Mahbanoozadeh (3rd).

Results in the 2004–05 season
Date	Event	SP		FS		Total	
Date	Event	P	Score	P	Score	P	Score
Apr 13–17, 2005	(Slovenia) 2005 Triglav Trophy	4	–	1	–	1	–

Results in the 2005–06 season
Date	Event	SP		FS		Total	
Date	Event	P	Score	P	Score	P	Score
Oct 6–9, 2005	2005 JGP Croatia	6	48.85	5	97.72	6	146.57
Jan 7–15, 2006	(United States) 2006 U.S. Championships (Junior)	8	49.54	12	84.65	11	134.19

Results in the 2006–07 season
Date	Event	SP		FS		Total	
Date	Event	P	Score	P	Score	P	Score
Jan 21–28, 2007	(United States) 2007 U.S. Championships (Junior)	7	52.82	7	105.68	6	158.50

Results in the 2007–08 season
Date	Event	SP		FS		Total	
Date	Event	P	Score	P	Score	P	Score
Sep 6–9, 2007	2007 JGP Romania	1	64.61	1	121.33	1	185.94
Oct 3–6, 2007	2007 JGP Bulgaria	1	64.41	2	123.26	2	187.67
Dec 6–9, 2007	(Poland) 2007–08 Junior Grand Prix Final	1	68.43	1	134.77	1	203.20
Jan 20–27, 2008	(United States) 2008 U.S. Championships (Junior)	1	71.33	1	142.43	1	213.76
Feb 25 – Mar 2, 2008	(Bulgaria) 2008 World Junior Championships	1	69.35	1	130.55	1	199.90

Results in the 2008–09 season
Date	Event	SP		FS		Total	
Date	Event	P	Score	P	Score	P	Score
Feb 23 – Mar 1, 2009	(Bulgaria) 2009 World Junior Championships	1	74.30	1	147.70	1	222.00

== Filmography ==
Year	Media	Role	Notes
2018	Dancing with the Stars	Contestant	Season 26 (4 episodes)
2018	Will & Grace	Timothy	Season 10; Episode 8
2018	Ridiculousness	Himself	Season 11; Episode 1
2018	Dancing with the Stars: Juniors	Judge	Season 1 (9 episodes)
2019	RuPaul's Drag Race	Judge	Season 11; Episode 6: "The Draglympics" (Guest judge and choreographer)
2019	You Need to Calm Down	Himself	Appearance in Taylor Swift's music video
2019–20	Whose Line Is It Anyway?	Himself	Season 7; Episode 6 Season 8; Episode 14
2020	What Would You Do?	Himself	Season 16; Episode 2
2020	This Day in Useless Celebrity History	Host	
2020	The Eric Andre Show	Himself	Season 5; Episode 1: "A King is Born"
2020	Sugar Rush	Guest Judge	Christmas Season 2, Episode 1
2021	Messyness	Co-host	
2021	Nickelodeon's Unfiltered	Himself	Episode: "That's A Corny Dog!"
2023	Stars on Mars	Himself	Winner
2026	Glitter & Gold: Ice Dancing	Himself	
2026	St. Denis Medical	Tom	Season 2, Episode 1: “Experience With Human Babies”
2026	Dancing with the Stars: The Next Pro	Guest Contestant	Season 1 finale, paired with Selena Hamilton
