= Love Connie =

American actor

- Born: John Cantwell; Mississippi, U.S.
- Occupations: Actor, drag queen

Love Connie is the stage name of John Cantwell, an American drag queen, actor and former member of the improv group The Nellie Olesons.

== Early life ==
Cantwell was born in Mississippi and raised in Louisiana.

== Career ==
Cantwell appeared in the film Legally Blonde and the TV shows Dharma & Greg, Pushing Daisies, and Will & Grace.

Love Connie has a WOW Presents Plus comedy series called Connie-wood. Love Connie was a special guest on the RuPaul's Drag Race episodes "The Draglympics" (2019), "50/50's Most Gagworthy Stars" (2023), "Rate-A-Queen" (2024) and "Queen Choice Awards" (2024).
