= Plastique Tiara =

Vietnamese-American drag performer and entertainer

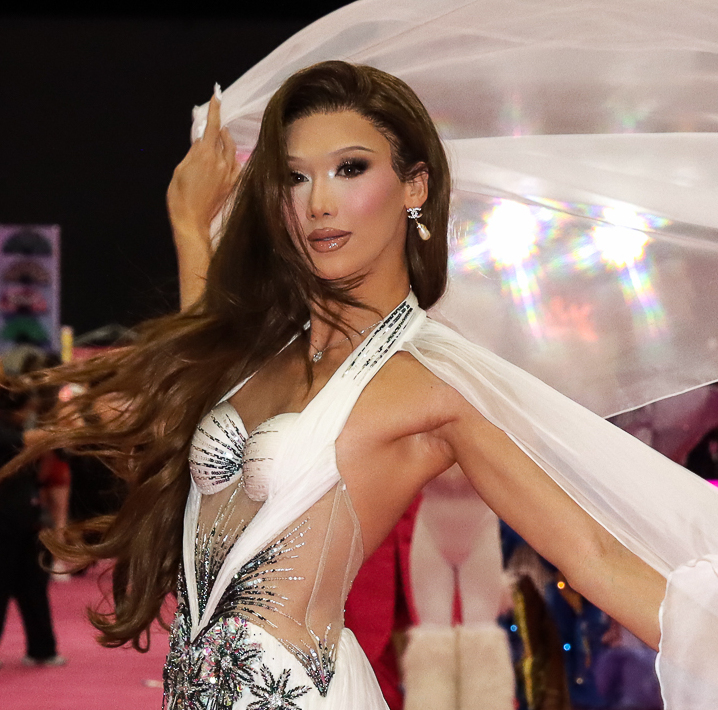
- Plastique Tiara at RuPaul's DragCon LA, 2024
- Born: Trần Nguyễn Thanh Đức; April 11, 1997 (age 29); Ho Chi Minh City, Vietnam
- Television: RuPaul's Drag Race (season 11); RuPaul's Drag Race All Stars (season 9)
- Spouse: Steven (m. 2025)
- Website: plastiquetiara.com

Trần Nguyễn Thanh Đức (born April 11, 1997), known professionally as Plastique Tiara, is a Vietnamese-American drag performer, dancer, and model who competed on season 11 of RuPaul's Drag Race and season 9 of RuPaul's Drag Race All Stars. As an influencer with over 16 million followers across their platforms, Đức is the most-followed Drag Race alum on social media.

== Early life ==
Trần Nguyễn Thanh Đức was born on April 11, 1997, in Ho Chi Minh City, Vietnam. He was raised in Vietnam by his grandparents. In 2008, at age 11, Đức immigrated to the United States, becoming a first-generation American immigrant.

== Career ==
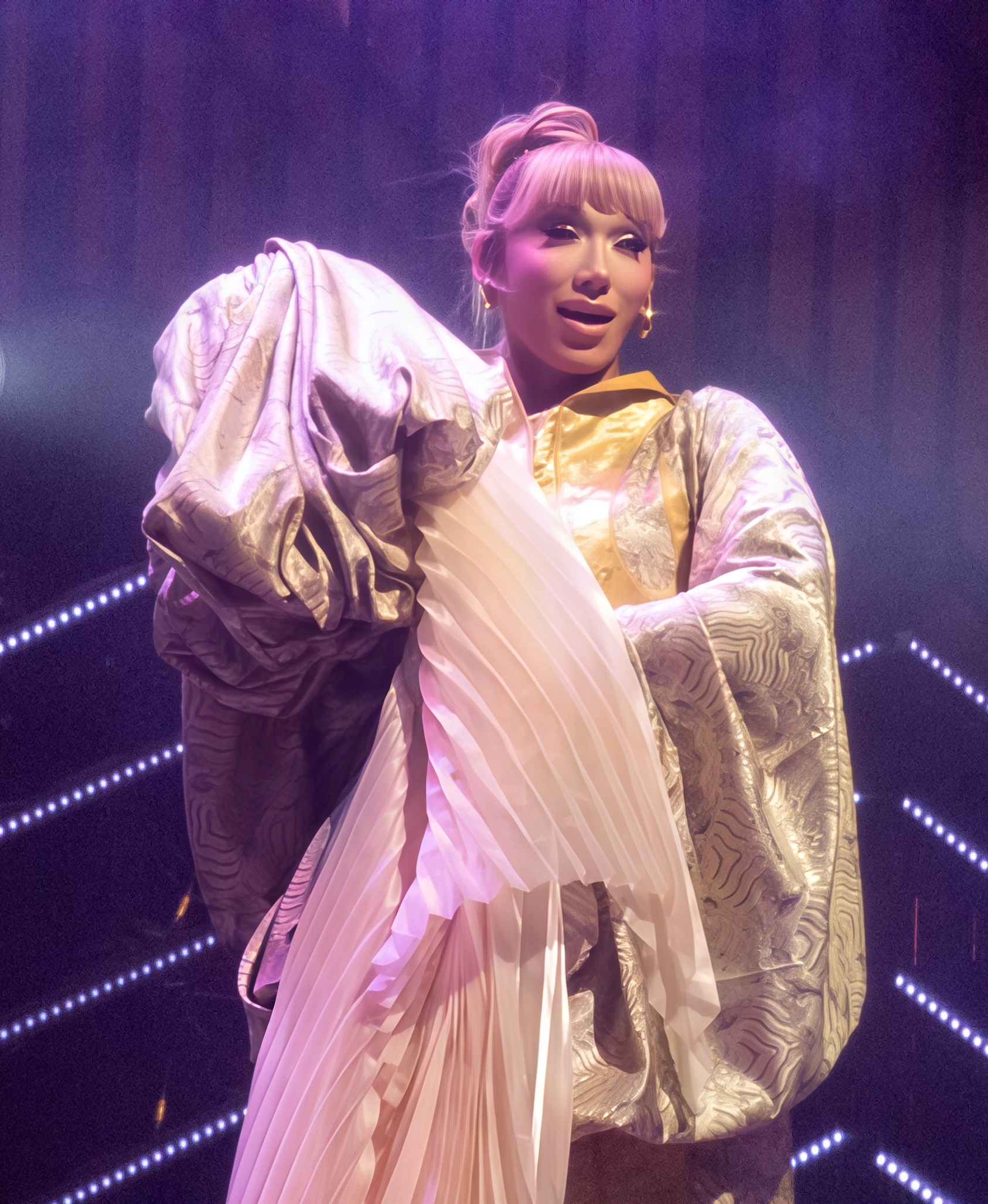
Plastique Tiara performing as part of the RuPaul's Drag Race All-Stars tour, 2024

Competing on season 11 of RuPaul's Drag Race in 2019, Plastique impersonated Lovely Mimi for the Snatch Game challenge and won the "Farm to Runway" design challenge. She was eliminated from the competition in the ninth episode, after placing in the bottom two of an acting challenge and losing a lip sync against Vanessa Vanjie Mateo to "Hood Boy" (2006) by Fantasia, placing eighth overall. After the show, she joined the Werq the World tour and the rotating cast of RuPaul's Drag Race Live! On April 23, 2024, Plastique was announced as one of the eight contestants competing on the ninth season of RuPaul's Drag Race All Stars.

In 2019, Plastique Tiara released the dance-pop single "Irresistible", accompanied by a music video. Plastique Tiara has cited Vietnamese ballads, K-pop, and V-pop among their musical influences. In 2021, Plastique Tiara and Drag Race contestant Kim Chi collaborated on a cosmetics collection.

Plastique Tiara joined TikTok in 2019, and as of August 2025 is the most-followed Drag Race alum on the app with 11.8 million followers, as well as on Instagram, with 4.5 million followers.

Plastique Tiara has been featured on the cover of L'Officiel Vietnam.

== Personal life ==
Đức is based in Los Angeles, previously Dallas until 2019. He is queer. On March 29, 2025, Đức announced that he was engaged to his boyfriend of three years. The couple got married in August 2025.

Đức created his alter ego Plastique Tiara after the My Little Pony character Diamond Tiara, but later replaced the “Diamond” with “Plastique”. Plastique Tiara has been described as a "drag daughter" of fellow Drag Race contestant Alyssa Edwards, in the Haus of Edwards also including past contestants Gia Gunn, Laganja Estranja, and Shangela.

== Filmography ==
=== Television ===
Year	Title	Role	Notes	Ref
2019	RuPaul's Drag Race	Themself	Contestant	
2019	RuPaul's Drag Race: Untucked	Themself	Contestant	
2024	RuPaul's Drag Race All Stars season 9	Themself	Contestant	
2024	RuPaul's Drag Race All Stars: Untucked	Themself	Contestant	
