= Bring Back My Queens! =

- RuPaul's Drag Race episode
- Episode no.: Season 11; Episode 11
- Presented by: RuPaul
- Original air date: May 9, 2019

Guest appearances
- Wanda Sykes; Lena Waithe

Episode chronology
← Previous "Dragracadabra"	Next → "Queens Everywhere"
- RuPaul's Drag Race season 11

"Bring Back My Queens!" is the eleventh episode of the eleventh season of the American reality competition television series RuPaul's Drag Race. It originally aired on May 9, 2019. The episode's main challenge tasks the remaining competitors with giving makeovers to the eliminated contestants. Wanda Sykes and Lena Waithe are guest judges. Nina West is eliminated from the competition after placing in the bottom and losing a lip-sync contest against Silky Nutmeg Ganache to "No Scrubs" (1999) by TLC.

== Episode ==
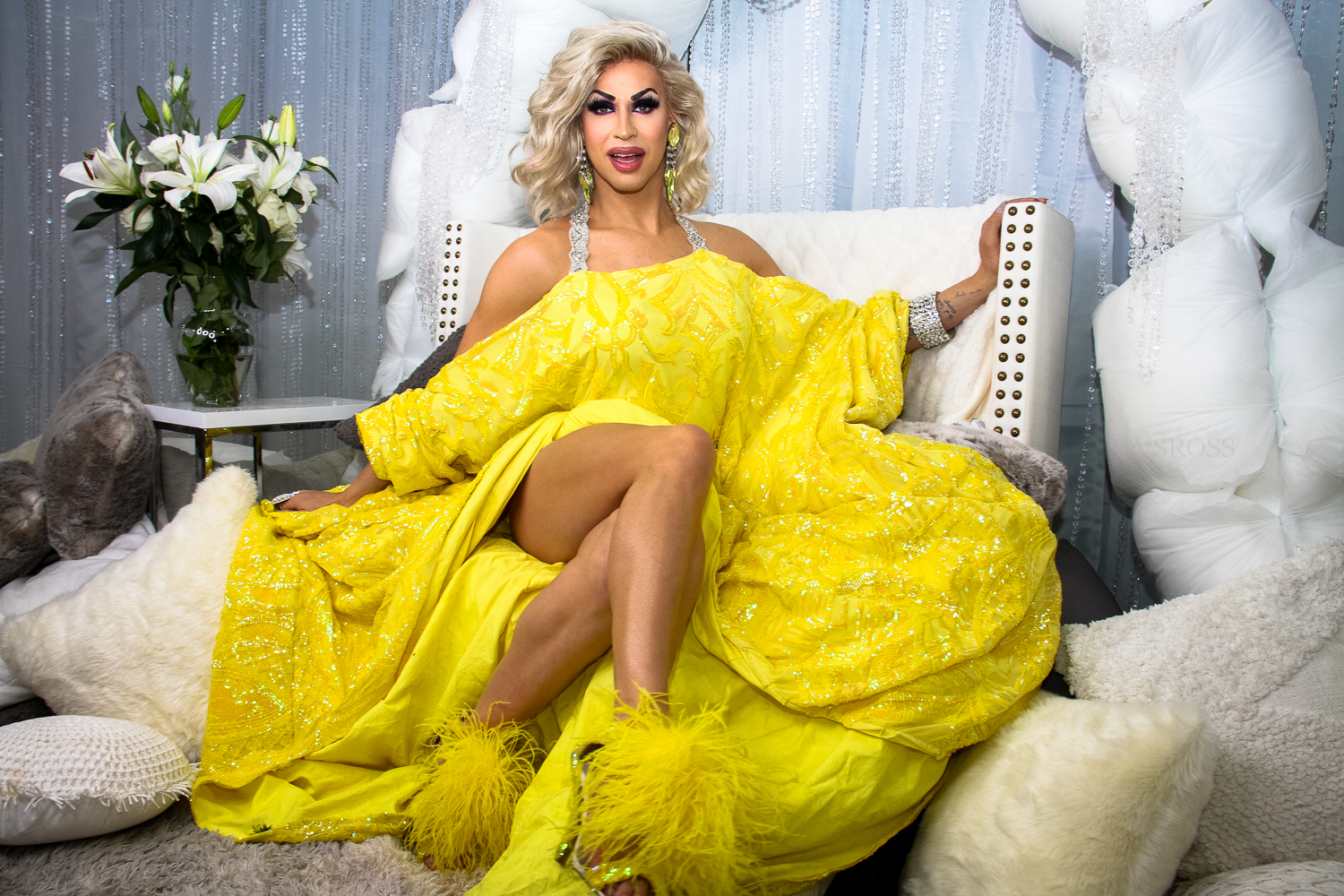
Brooke Lynn Hytes wins the episode's main challenge.

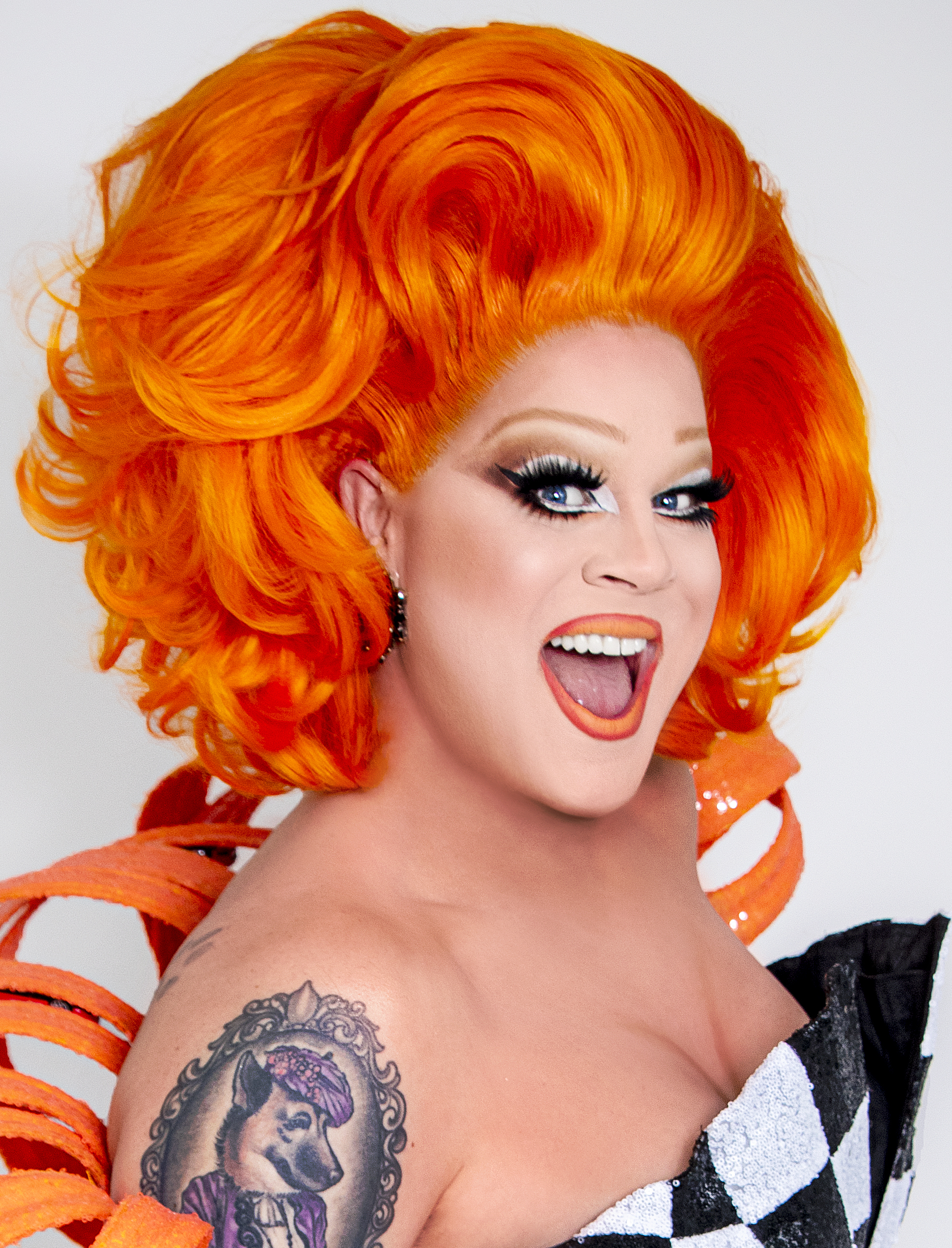
Nina West is eliminated from the competition.

The contestants return to the Werk Room after Shuga Cain's elimination on the previous episode. On a new day, RuPaul greets the group and reveals the mini-challenge, which tasks the contestants with participating in a fake slapping contest for the "most compelling" reaction. Brooke Lynn Hytes is declared the winner of the mini-challenge.

RuPaul then invites the eliminated contestants into the Werk Room. RuPaul reveals the main challenge, which tasks the remaining competitors with giving makeovers to the eliminated contestants. As the winner of the mini-challenge, Brooke Lynn Hytes assigns the following pairs:

- A'keria C. Davenport and Honey Davenport
- Brooke Lynn Hytes and Plastique Tiara
- Nina West and Shuga Cain
- Silky Nutmeg Ganache and Soju
- Vanessa Vanjie Mateo and Ariel Versace
- Yvie Oddly and Scarlet Envy

The teams start to prepare for the fashion show. Ariel Versace is focused on some wigs she accidentally left behind. Soju talks about her cyst. RuPaul returns to the Werk Room to meet with each pair, asking questions and offering advice. Scarlet Envy says she is most surprised to see Silky Nutmeg Ganache and Vanessa Vanjie Mateo are still in the competition.

On elimination day, the contestants make final preparations in the Werk Room for the fashion show. A'keria C. Davenport asks about Ariel Versace's wigs, prompting Ariel Versace to clarify that she only left a wig for Silky Nutmeg Ganache. A'keria C. Davenport also shares Scarlet Envy's comments with the rest of the group. Silky Nutmeg Ganache gets upset, but Scarlet Envy defends her opinions. On the main stage, RuPaul welcomes fellow judges Michelle Visage and Ross Mathews, as well as guest judges Wanda Sykes and Lena Waithe. RuPaul shares the assignment of the main challenge and the runway category ("Drag Family Values"), then the fashion show commences.

After the contestants present their looks, the judges deliver their critiques. RuPaul asks the contestants to say who should be eliminated from the competition and why. After the contestants give their answers, the judges deliberate, then share the results with the group. Brooke Lynn Hytes is declared then winner of the main challenge. Nina West and Silky Nutmeg Ganache place in the bottom and face off in a lip-sync contest to "No Scrubs" (1999) by TLC. Silky Nutmeg Ganache wins the lip-sync and Nina West is eliminated from the competition. Nina West returns to the Werk Room to write a message on the mirror for the remaining contestants. On the main stage, RuPaul congrats the five remaining contestants.

== Production and broadcast ==
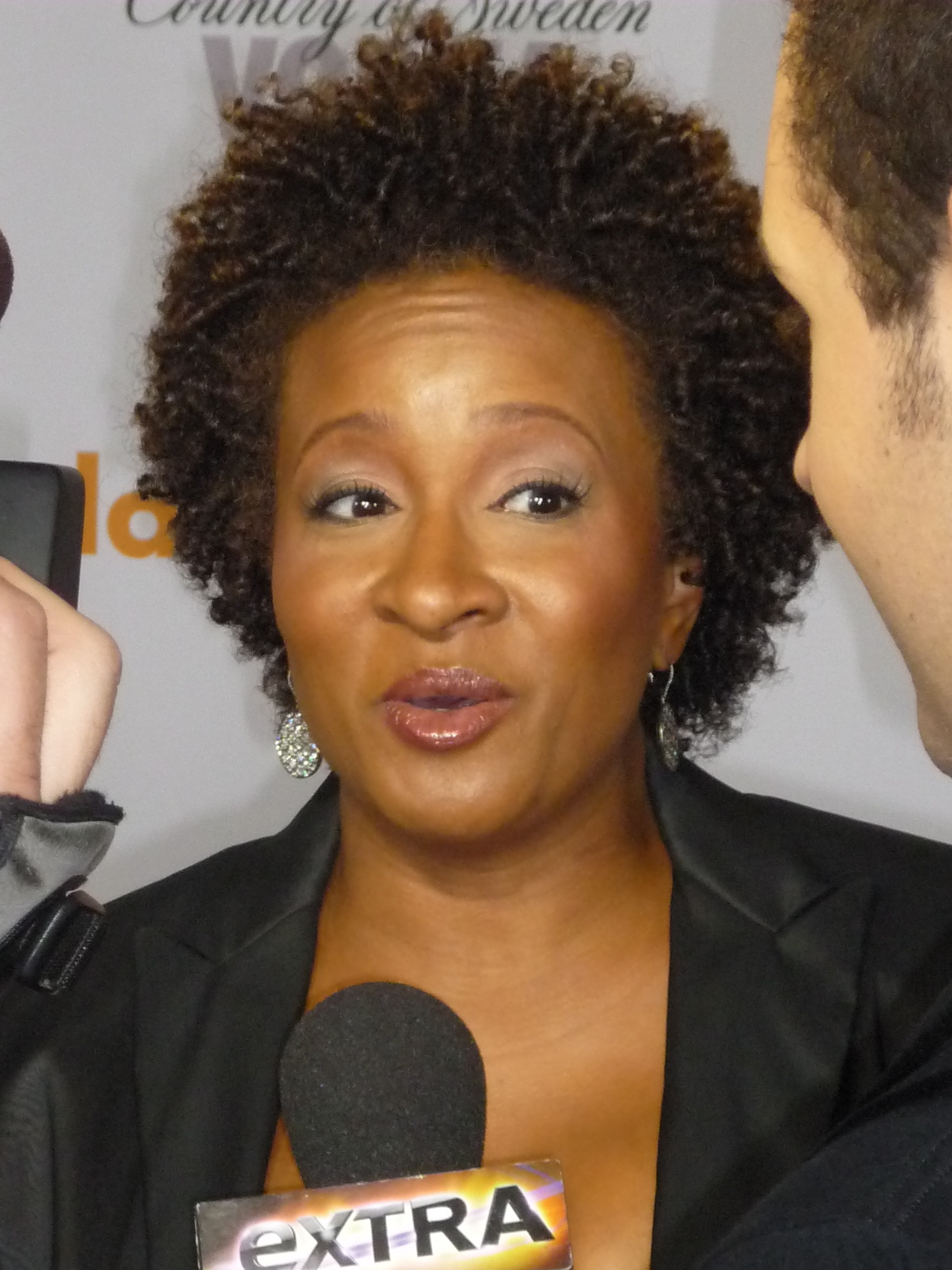
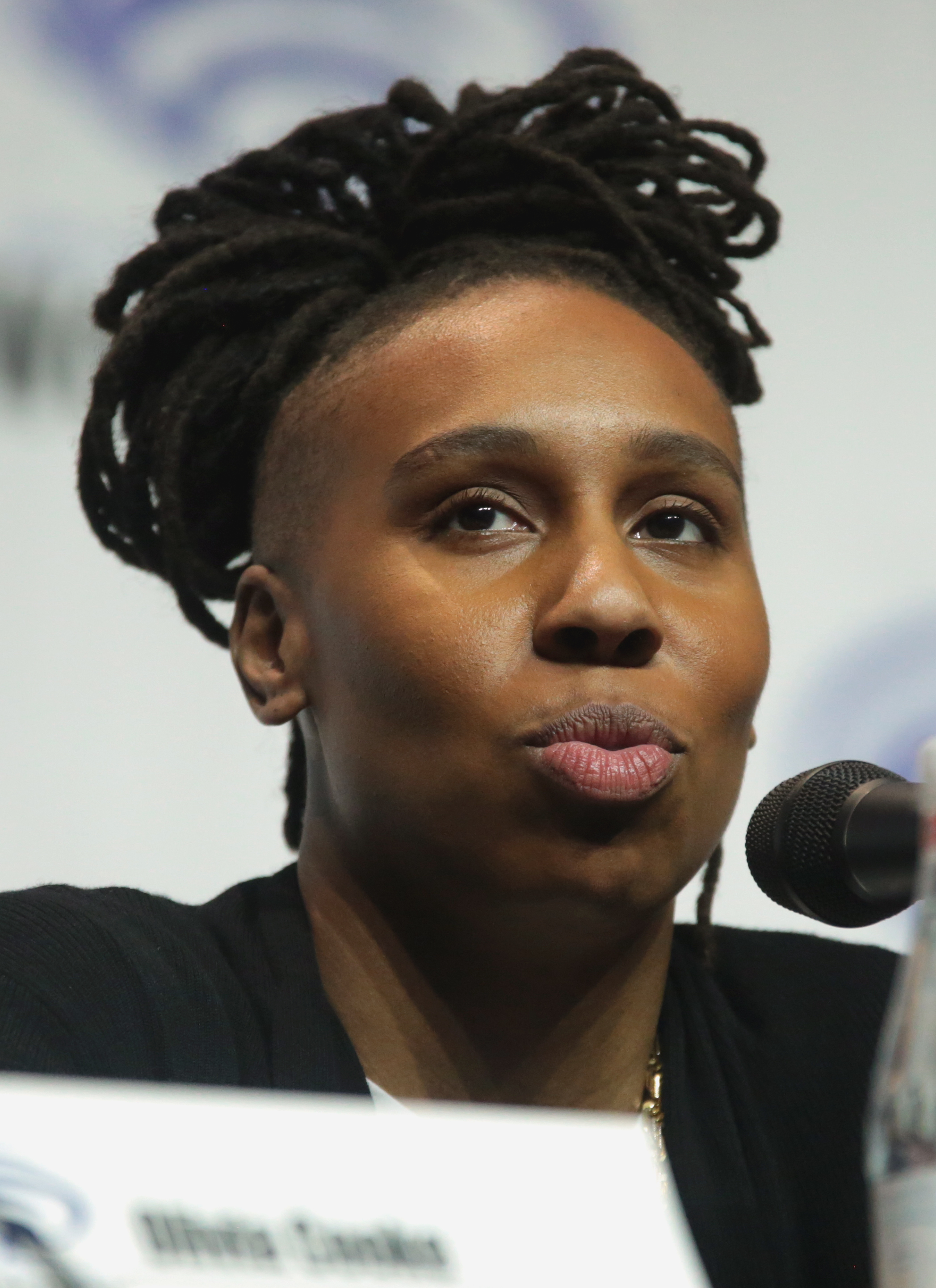
Wanda Sykes (top) and Lena Waithe (bottom) are guest judges.

The episode originally aired on May 9, 2019.

In response to the lip-sync contest, RuPaul says "meh".

Honey Davenport shared on social media what she would have worn had she still been in the competition.

=== Fashion ===
In the Werk Room, RuPaul wears a maroon suit with a white dress shirt, as well as a cowboy hat. On the main stage, RuPaul has a beige dress, gold accessories, and a large blonde wig. Visage has a black outfit. Mathews has a plaid suit. Waithe wears a jacket with a colorful floral print.

For the fashion show, Scarlet Envy and Yvie Oddle have similar denim dresses with many straps. Both have collars and straps fashioned as headpieces. Nina West and Shuga Cain wear similar colorful outfits inspired by Kinky Boots. The former's resembles the pride flag and the latter's resembles the transgender flag. Nina West has a bonde wig and Shuga Cain wears a pink wig. A'keria C. Davenport and Honey Davenport have similar dresses. The former's is yellow and the latter's is red. Both have long blonde wigs. Silky Nutmeg Ganache and Soju have blue outfits. The former's jumpsuit is short and the latter's bodysuit is long. Both have dark wigs. Ariel Versace and Vanessa Vanjie Mateo have red outfits. The former has a dress and the latter has pants. Both have red high-heeled shoes and blonde wigs. Brooke Lynn Hytes and Plastique Tiara have similar dresses. The former's is blue and the latter's is red. Brooke Lynn Hytes wears a red wig and Plastique Tiara has a blonde wig.

== Reception ==
Kate Kulzick of The A.V. Club gave the episode a rating of 'C'. Kulzick said the season's reunion episode was "significantly hampered by the mini-reunion" in "Bring Back My Queens!" Writing for Vulture, Matt Rogers rated the episode four out of five stars. Lydia Smith of PinkNews said Waithe "slayed" as a guest judge. Jessica Jalali included Brooke Lynn Hytes and Plastique Tiara in Screen Rant's 2021 list of the show's ten best "makeover challenge transformations", saying the two "embodied pageant glamour". Jalali opined, "Brooke Lynn made the smart decision to use pageant glamour as the inspiration for the makeover. As a result, both queens look stunning from head to toe."
