= L.A.D.P.! =

- RuPaul's Drag Race episode
- Episode no.: Season 11; Episode 9
- Presented by: RuPaul
- Original air date: April 25, 2019

Guest appearances
- Fortune Feimster; Cheyenne Jackson; Natasha Lyonne

Episode chronology
← Previous "Snatch Game at Sea"	Next → "Dragracadabra"
- RuPaul's Drag Race season 11

"L.A.D.P.!" is the ninth episode of the eleventh season of the American reality competition television series RuPaul's Drag Race. It originally aired on April 25, 2019. The episode's main challenge tasks the contestants with performing in an improvised comedy police sketch. Fortune Feimster, Cheyenne Jackson, and Natasha Lyonne are guest judges.

A'keria C. Davenport wins the main challenge. Plastique Tiara is eliminated from the competition after placing in the bottom and losing a lip-sync contest against Vanessa Vanjie Mateo to "Hood Boy" by Fantasia featuring Big Boi.

== Episode ==
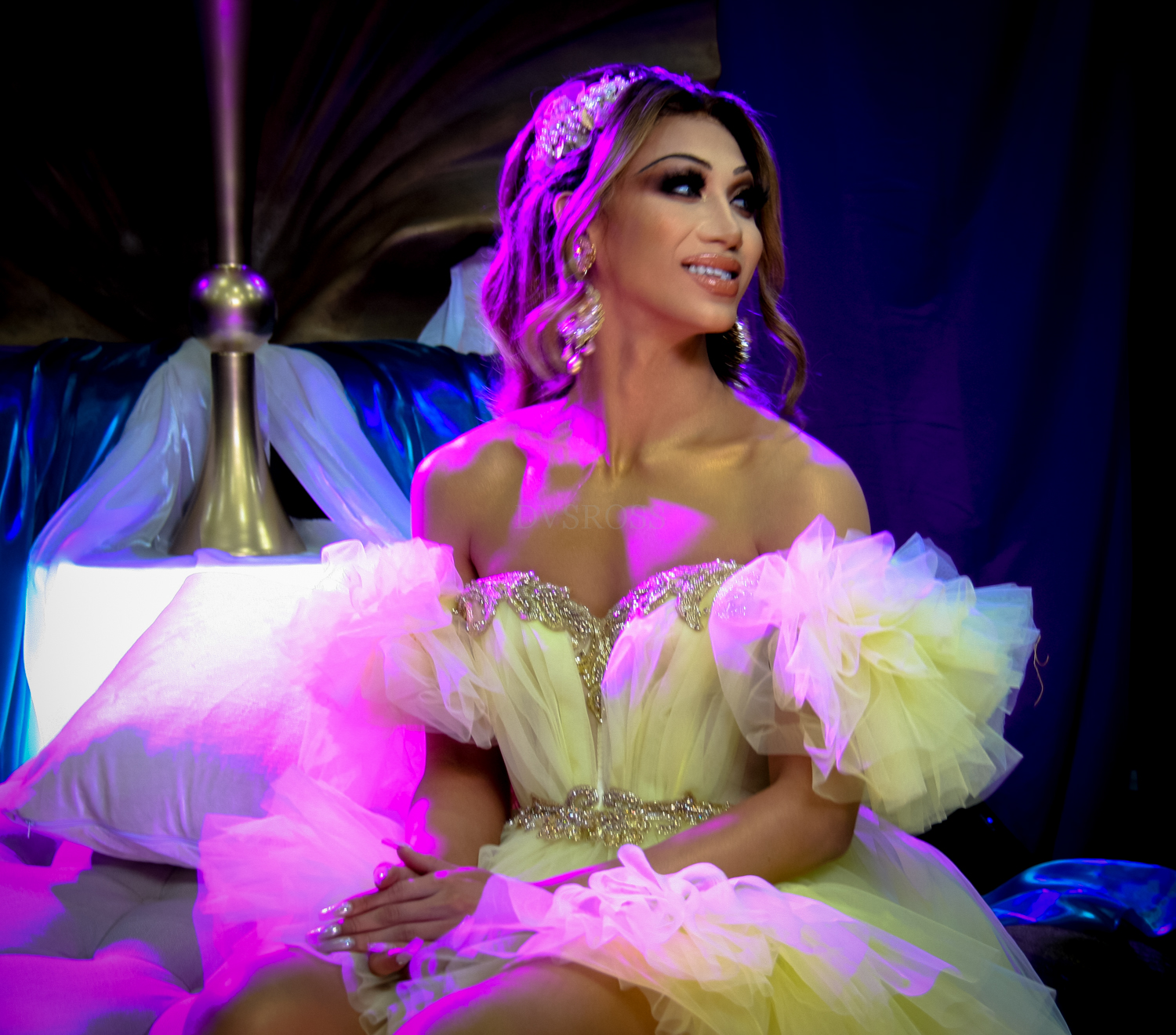
Plastique Tiara (pictured at RuPaul's DragCon LA in 2019) is eliminated from the competition.

The contestants return to the Werk Room after no one was eliminated on the previous episode. On a new day, RuPaul greets the group and reveals the mini-challenge, which tasks the contestants with "reading" (or playfully insulting) each other. Brooke Lynn Hytes wins the mini-challenge.

RuPaul then reveals the main challenge, which tasks the contestants with pairing up and performing in an improvised comedy police sketch for the TV series Los Angeles Drag Patrol (L.A.D.P.). As the winner of the mini-challenge, Brooke Lynn Hytes assigns the following pairs:

- Twerking Girls Corner Disturbance: A'keria C. Davenport and Yvie Oddly
- Indecent Exposure at the Trailer Park: Brooke Lynn Hytes and Nina West
- Catfight at the Liquor Store: Plastique Tiara and Vanessa Vanjie Mateo
- Back Alley Butt Pads: Shuga Cain and Silky Nutmeg Ganache

The teams review the scripts, select their roles, and start to rehearse. RuPaul returns to the Werk Room to meet with each pair, asking questions and offering advice. Before leaving, RuPaul reveals the contestants will be filming with Fortune Feimster and Cheyenne Jackson.

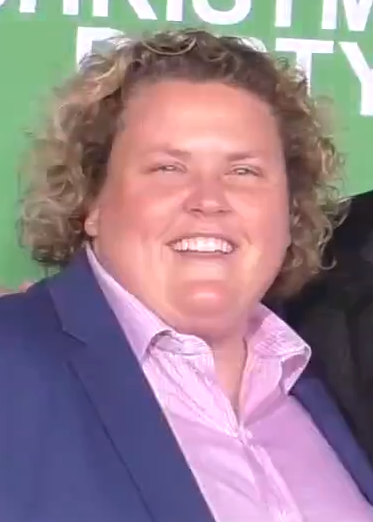
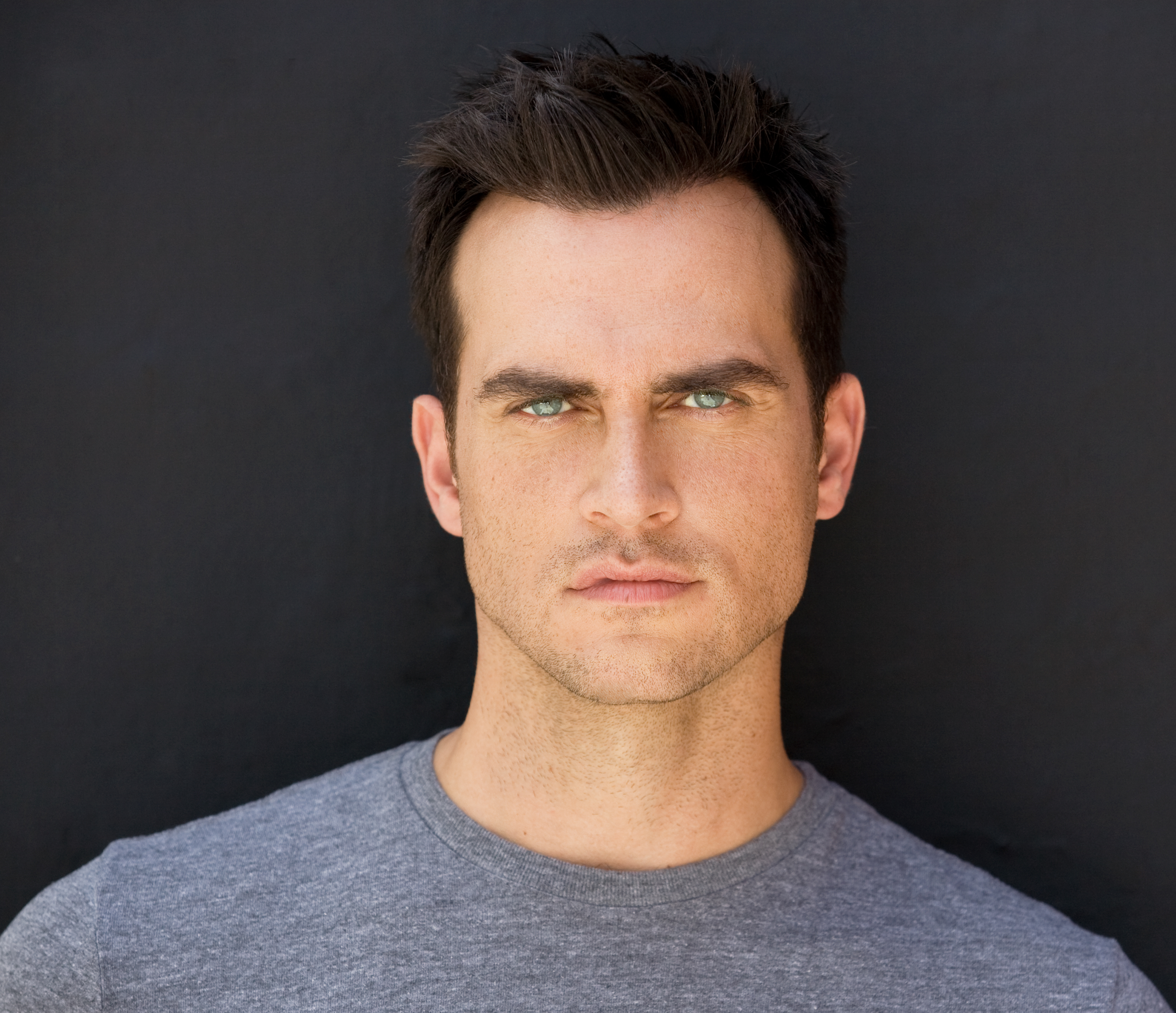
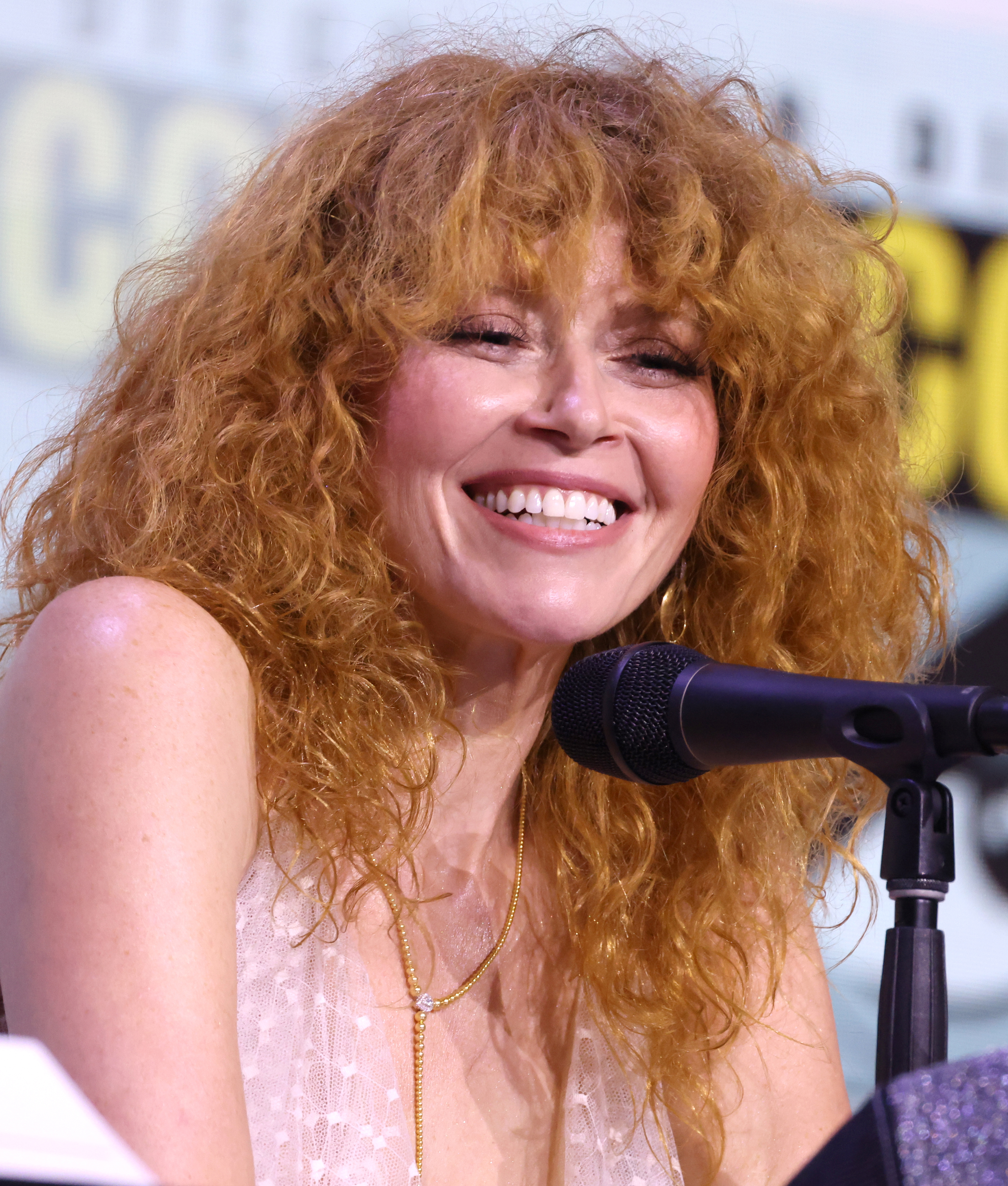
Fortune Feimster (top), Cheyenne Jackson (center), and Natasha Lyonne (bottom) are guest judges.

The contestants film the sketches and watch each other work. On elimination day, the contestants make final preparations in the Werk Room for the fashion show. On the main stage, RuPaul welcomes fellow judge Michelle Visage, as well as guest judges Feimster, Jackson, and Natasha Lyonne. RuPaul shares the assignment of the main challenge and the runway category ("Facekini Fantasy"), then the fashion show commences. After the contestants present their looks, the judges deliver their critiques, deliberate, then share the results with the group. A'keria C. Davenport is declared the winner of the main challenge. Plastique Tiara and Vanessa Vanjie Mateo place in the bottom and face off in a lip-sync contest to "Hood Boy" (2006) by Fantasia featuring Big Boi. Vanessa Vanjie Mateo wins the lip-sync and Plastique Tiara is eliminated from the competition. Plastique Tiara returns to the Werk Room to leave a message on the mirror for the remaining contestants.

== Production and broadcast ==
The episode originally aired on April 25, 2019.

Joey Nolfi of Entertainment Weekly wrote, "Plastique (drag daughter of All-Stars 2 contestant Alyssa Edwards) put up a fierce fight on the main stage, providing the emotional heart and soul to the pair's take on Fantasia Barrino's 'Hood Boy' while Vanjie balanced the set out with spectacular muscle and hardcore dance moves. A showgirl to the end, Plastique even capped her performance with a moving callback to Alyssa's go-to lip-sync gag as she rested her booted leg on the side of the stage before sashaying away."

=== Fashion ===
In the Werk Room, RuPaul wears a purple suit and a T-shirt from RuPaul's DragCon LA. For the main stage, RuPaul has a green dress and a blonde wig. Jackson wears a white suit with a black bow tie and Lyonne has an animal print.

For the fashion show, the contestants wear facekinis. Silky Nutmeg Ganache has a black leather insect-inspired outfit and a headpiece with antenna. Shuga Cain wears a Victorian dress with a floral print and a matching hat. Brooke Lynn Hytes wears a steampunk-inspired outfit and a matching zebra mask. Inspired by Leigh Bowery, Nina West has a red-and-white suit with polka dots and a matching hat. Vanessa Vanjie Mateo wears a red outfit and a long ponytail. Plastique Tiara has a black outfit with chaps. A'keria C. Davenport wears a bodysuit with markings related to plastic surgery. Yvie Oddly has a black outfit covered in green "slime". She wears tall black boots, large lips, and a neon wig.

== Reception ==
Kate Kulzick of The A.V. Club gave the episode a rating of 'B'. Writing for Vulture, Matt Rogers rated the episode three out of five stars.
