= Reunited (RuPaul's Drag Race season 11) =

- RuPaul's Drag Race episode
- Episode no.: Season 11; Episode 13
- Original air date: May 23, 2019

Episode chronology
← Previous "Queens Everywhere"	Next → "Grand Finale"
- RuPaul's Drag Race season 11

"Reunited" is the thirteen episode of the eleventh season of the American television series RuPaul's Drag Race. Filmed at the Orpheum Theatre in Los Angeles, the episode originally aired on May 23, 2019. It sees the season's contestants reunite ahead of the finale. RuPaul moderates discussions and video montages are played throughout.

== Episode ==
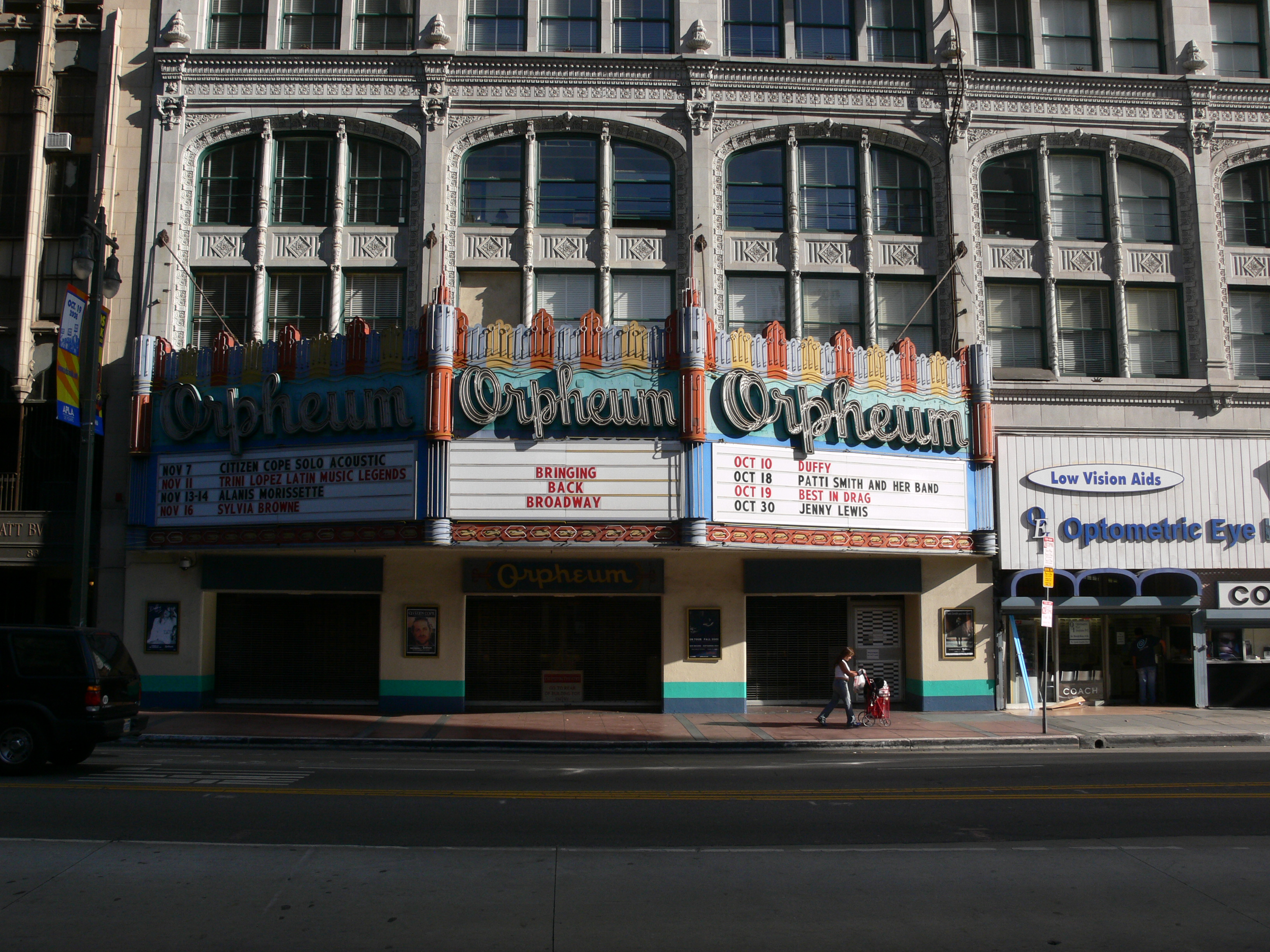
The episode was filmed at the Orpheum Theatre (exterior pictured in 2008) in Los Angeles.

RuPaul and the season's contestants reunite on the main stage of the Orpheum Theatre in Los Angeles. RuPaul interviews Vanessa Vanjie Mateo, which segues into a discussion about her relationship with Brooke Lynn Hytes. Some of the contestants confront Ra'Jah O'Hara about some of her behavior. Plastique Tiara confronts A'keria C. Davenport. RuPaul talks to Silky Nutmeg Ganache and Yvie Oddly about their feud, then interviews Nina West. RuPaul also plays the video message Alexandria Ocasio-Cortez shared on social media directed at Nina West. RuPaul then interviews Scarlet Envy, prompting a discussion about Brooke Lynn Hytes's opinions of Scarlet Envy. Some of the contestants talk about their social media following. The group then discuss the incident involving Ariel Versace's wigs. Ra'Jah O'Hara gives Ariel Versace back a wig she had taken home. Mercedes Iman Diamond talks about being the show's first Muslim contestant. She and Kahanna Montrese also discuss the viral "Opulence, you own everything" line from the episode "Good God Girl, Get Out". The group play "Toot or Boot" to express approval or disapproval of some of the season's runway looks, then "read" (or playfully insult) each other. A video montage has unseen footage of some of the season's guest judges. The eliminated contestants share what they appreciate about the four finalists.

== Production and broadcast ==
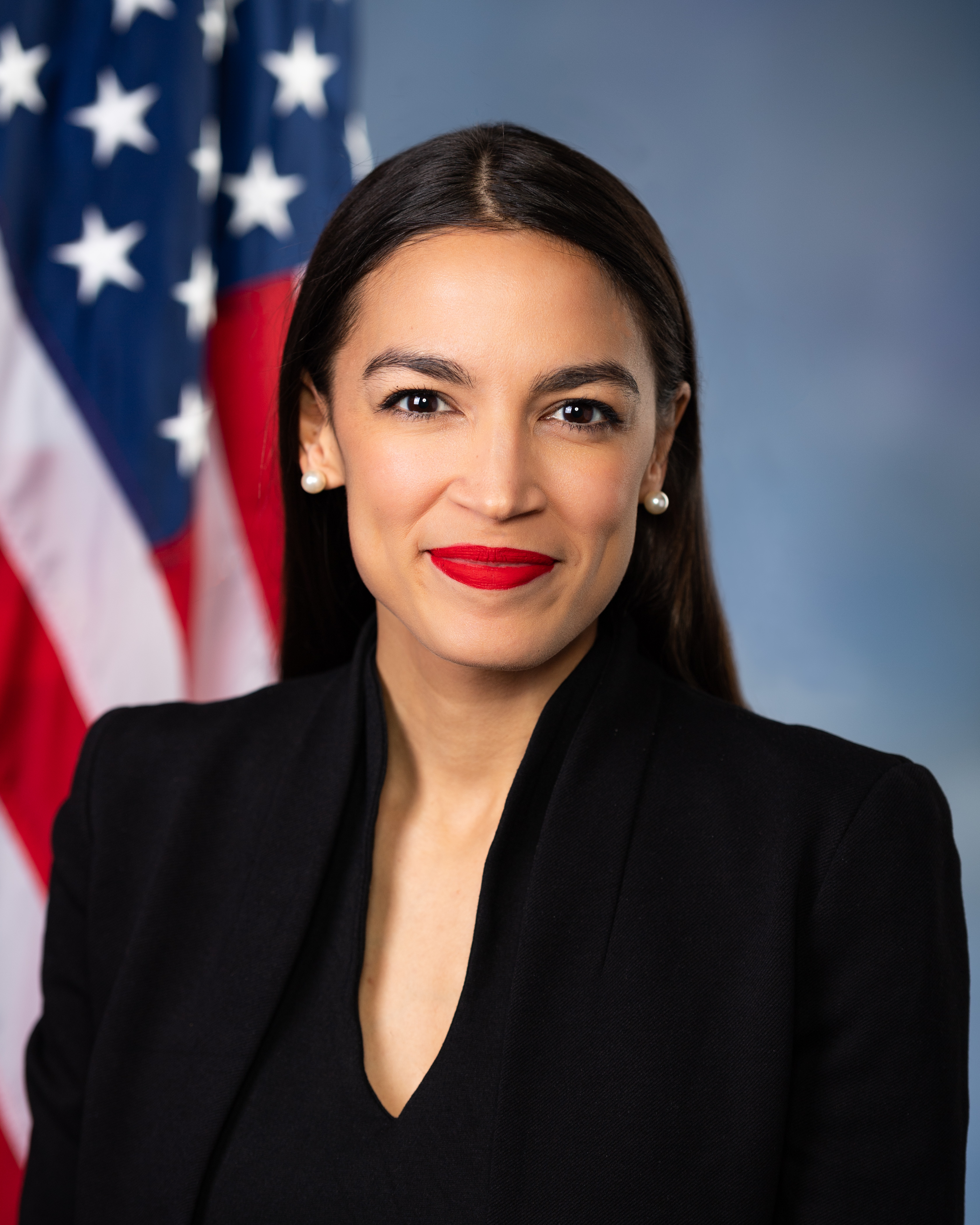
RuPaul plays a video message shared by Alexandria Ocasio-Cortez (pictured in 2018) on social media following Nina West's elimination from the competition.

The episode originally aired on May 23, 2019.

When the eliminated contestants are asked to offer praise for the finalists, many raise their hands to appreciate Silky Nutmeg Ganache.

=== Fashion ===
RuPaul wears a colorful suit and a red dress shirt. A'keria C. Davenport has a blue outfit with feathers. Ariel Versace wears a black-and-tan dress with a pink wig. Brooke Lynn Hytes has a black-and-red outfit, red gloves, and head coverings. Honey Davenport wears a black-and-yellow outfit and a blonde-and-dark wig. Kahanna Montrese has a dark outfit and a long blonde wig. Mercedes Iman Diamond wears a red outfit and a dark wig. Nina West has a grey-and-red outfit with stuffed toy animals attached, as well as a blonde wig. Plastique Tiara wears a colorful outfit with a headpiece. Ra'Jah O'Hara has a purple dress and a matching short wig. Scarlet Envy wears a green dress and a matching wig. Shuga Cain has a purple dress, matching gloves, and a dark wig. Silky Nutmeg Ganache wears a red-and-white outfit. Soju has a black outfit, matching gloves, and a blonde wig. Vanessa Vanjie Mateo wears a mesh outfit with hoop earrings and a long dark wig. Yvie Oddly has a red outfit and a towel on her head. She wears rubber ducks as accessories and earrings.

== Reception ==
Kate Kulzick of The A.V. Club gave the episode a rating of 'C+'. In 2020, Bernardo Sim of Screen Rant wrote, "Season 11 of RuPaul’s Drag Race wasn't too heavy on the drama, but what made its reunion so weak is that it failed to provide closure to even the very few unresolved situations that took place during the season." Sim opined, "RuPaul tried to get the facts straight regarding Ariel Versace’s 'wig-gate,' but the discourse only left viewers even more confused. Even the main conflict of the season – between finalists Yvie Oddly and Silky Nutmeg Ganache – had no significant development during the reunion, as Silky was surprisingly reserved during the episode."
