= Dragracadabra =

- RuPaul's Drag Race episode
- Episode no.: Season 11; Episode 10
- Presented by: RuPaul
- Original air date: May 2, 2019

Guest appearances
- Katherine Langford (guest judge); Gina Rodriguez (guest judge); Delta Work

Episode chronology
← Previous "L.A.D.P.!"	Next → "Bring Back My Queens!"
- RuPaul's Drag Race season 11

"Dragracadabra" is the tenth episode of the eleventh season of the American reality competition television series RuPaul's Drag Race. It originally aired on May 2, 2019. The episode's main challenge tasks the contestants with performing in a magic show for the judges and a live audience. Australian actress Katherine Langford and American actress Gina Rodriguez are guest judges. Former contestant Delta Work also makes a guest appearance for the mini-challenge.

Nina West wins the episode's main challenge. Shuga Cain is eliminated from the competition after placing in the bottom and losing a lip-sync contest against Vanessa Vanjie Mateo to "No More Drama" by Mary J. Blige.

== Episode ==
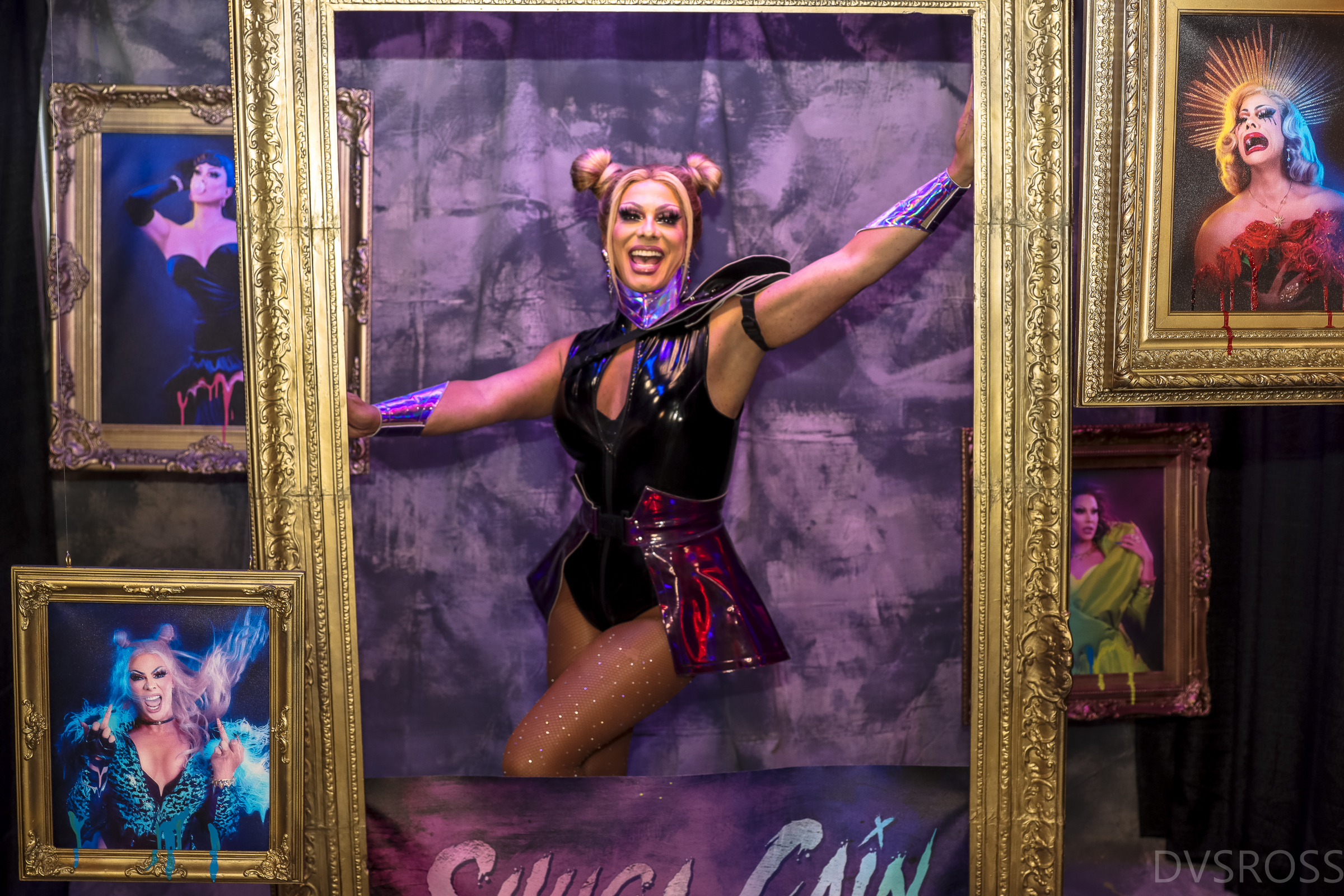
Shuga Cain (pictured at RuPaul's DragCon LA in 2022) is eliminated from the competition.

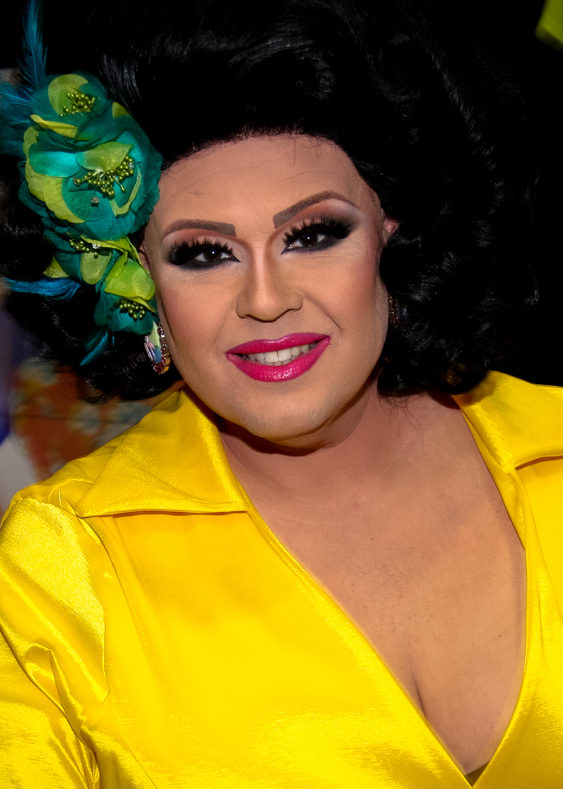
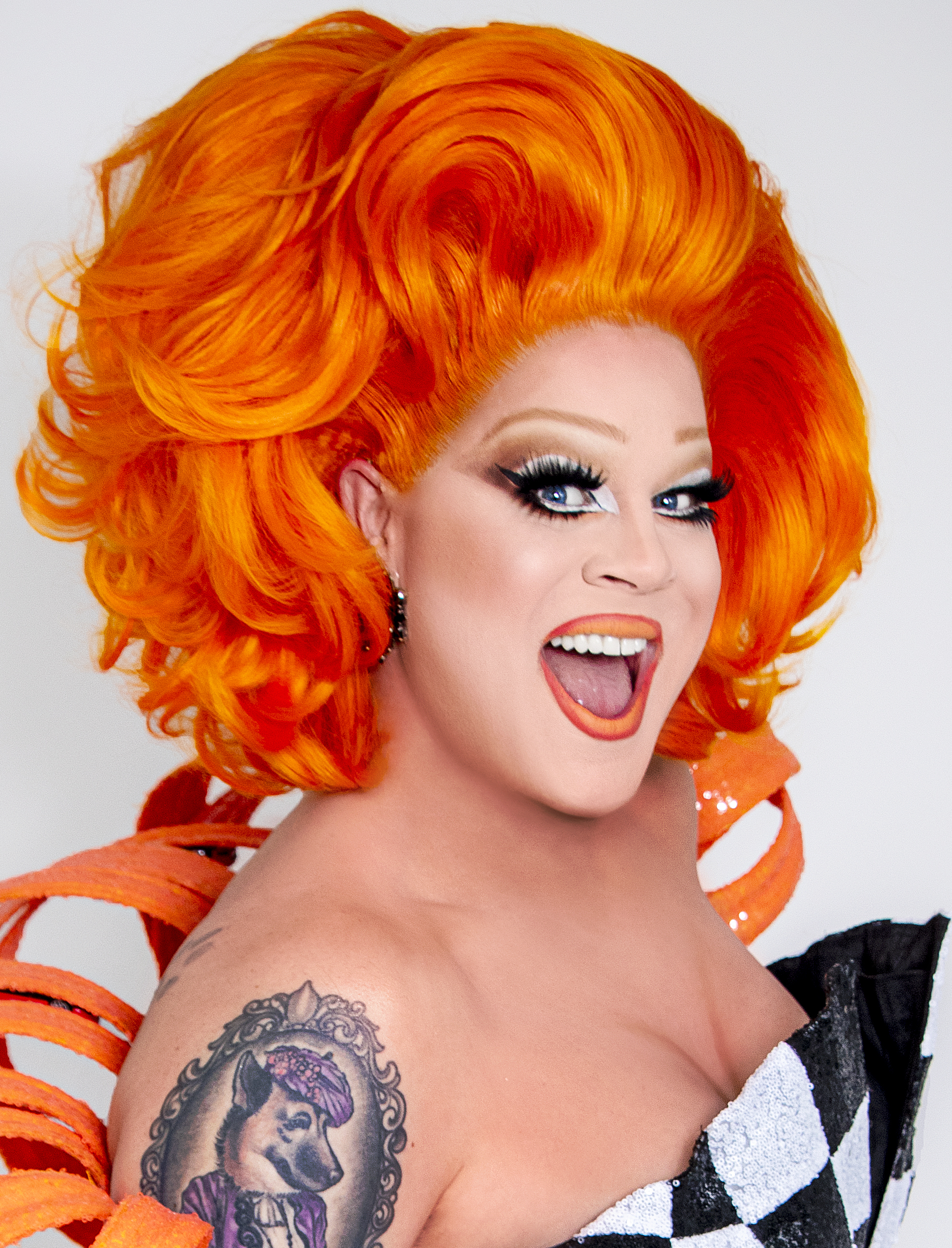
Delta Work (pictured in 2017) makes a guest appearance for the mini-challenge; Nina West wins the episode's main challenge.

The contestants return to the Werk Room after Plastique Tiara's elimination on the previous episode. On a new day, RuPaul greets the group and invites Delta Work and members of the Pit Crew. RuPaul reveals the mini-challenge, which tasks the contestants with playing a game called "Balls to the Wall", where each competitor partners with a member of the Pit Crew to transfer as many balls as possible to a basket using different parts of their bodies. Vanessa Vanjie Mateo wins the mini-challenge.

RuPaul then reveals the main challenge, which tasks the contestants with teaming up and performing a magic show for the judges and a live audience. As the winner of the mini-challenge, Vanessa Vanjie Mateo determines the following two teams:

- Team Da Black Magic: A'keria C. Davenport, Silky Nutmeg Ganache, Vanessa Vanjie Mateo, and Yvie Oddly
- Team The Mighty Tucks: Brooke Lynn Hytes, Nina West, and Shuga Cain

The teams start to develop their concepts. RuPaul returns to the Werk Room to meet with each team, asking questions and offering advice. The contestants then rehearse tricks on the main stage with a magician.

On elimination day, the contestants make final preparations for the magic and fashion shows. On the main stage, RuPaul welcomes fellow judge Michelle Visage as well as guest judges Katherine Langford and Gina Rodriguez. RuPaul shares the assignment of the main challenge and the runway category ("Caftan Realness"), then the magic show commences, followed by the fashion show. After the contestants present their looks, the judges deliver their critiques, deliberate, then share the results with the group. Nina West is declared the winner of the main challenge. Shuga Cain and Vanessa Vanjie Mateo place in the bottom and face off in a lip-sync contest to "No More Drama" (2001) by Mary J. Blige. Vanessa Vanjie Mateo wins the lip-sync and Shuga Cain is eliminated from the competition. Vanessa Vanjie Mateo returns to the Werk Room to leave a message on the mirror for the remaining contestants.

== Production and broadcast ==
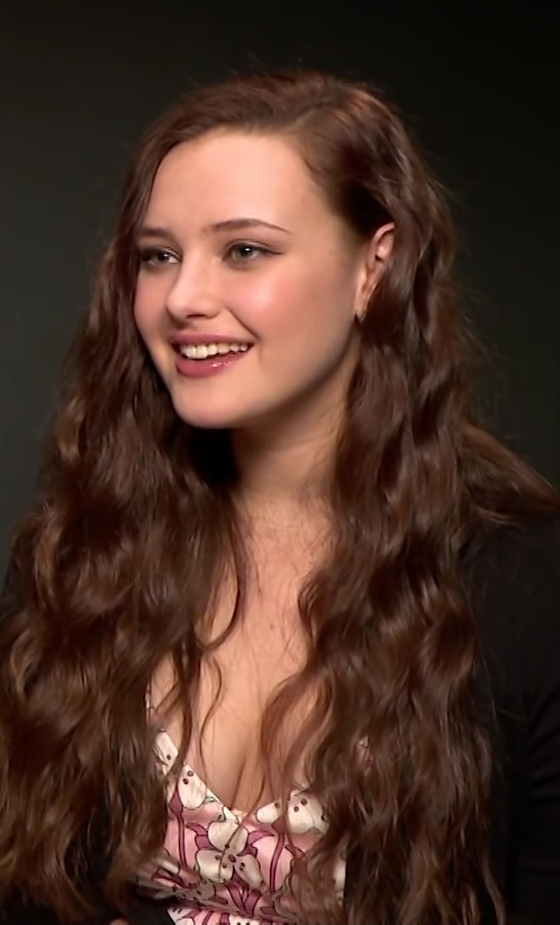
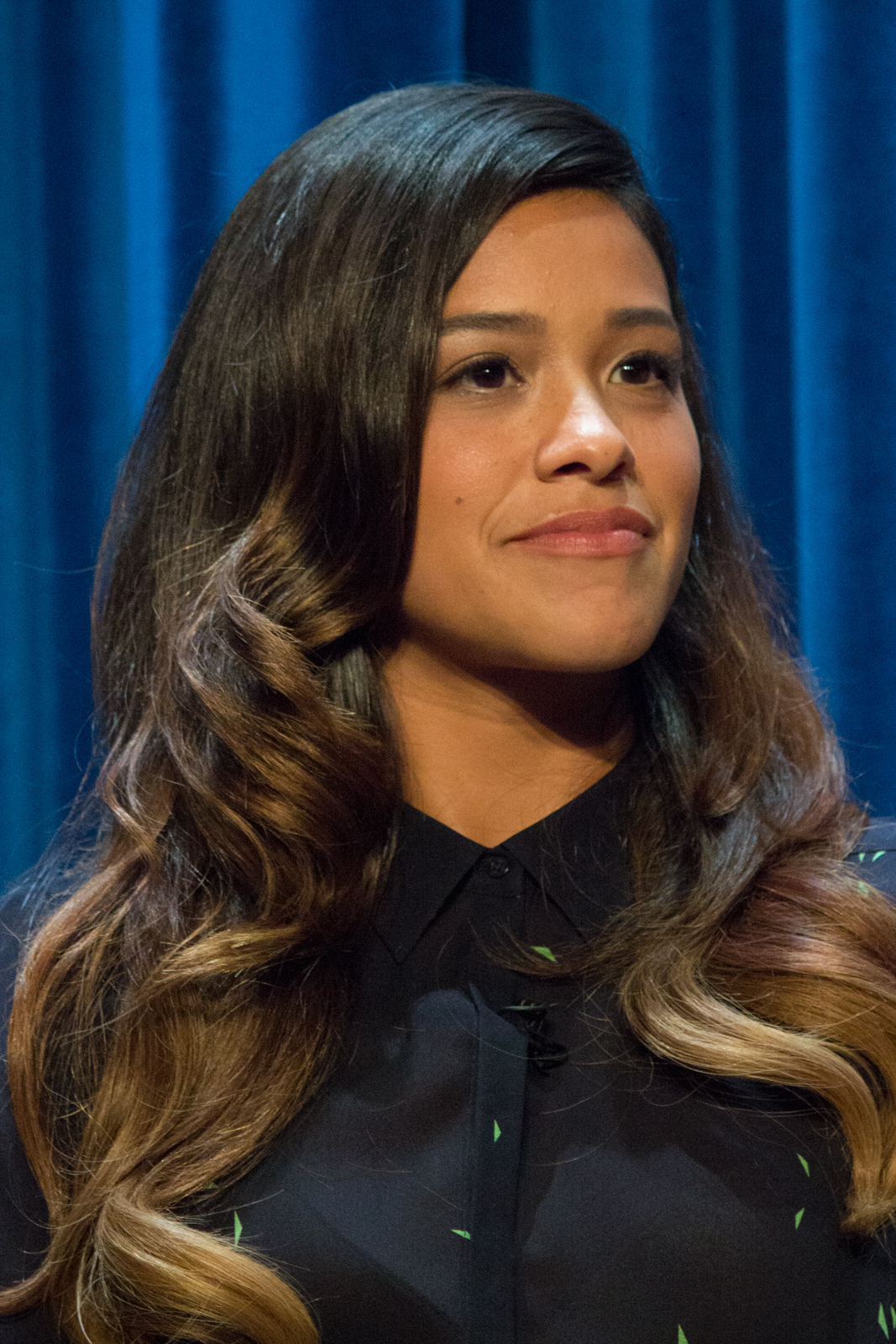
Katherine Langford (left) and Gina Rodriguez (right) are guest judges.

The episode originally aired on May 2, 2019.

Members of the Pit Crew include Bruno Alcantara and Shawn Morales.

=== Fashion ===
For the main stage RuPaul wears large gold hoop earrings and a red wig. For the magic show, Brooke Lynn Hytes wears a short dress with stars, black gloves and a matching collar, and a blonde wig. Nina West has a black-and-silver jacket, black footwear, a bow tie, and a blonde wig. Shuga Cain wears a black-and-silver bodysuit and a brown wig. A'keria C. Davenport has a red outfit and a blonde wig. Silky Nutmeg Ganache wears a black outfit, white footwear, and a dark wig. Vanessa Vanjie Mateo has a black-and-red outfit with black gloves and a blonde wig. Yvie Oddly wears a silver outfit, black high-heeled shoes and matching gloves, and a dark wig.

For the fashion show, the contestants wear kaftans. Silky Nutmeg Ganache has an orange outfit and a wig resembling a stack of balls. Yvie Oddly wears a yellow outfit with long necklaces and a headpiece. A'keria C. Davenport has a butterfly-inspired outfit, black high-heels, large earrings, and a blonde wig. Vanessa Vanjie Mateo wears a cheetah print with a matching head covering, gold accessories, and a brown wig. Brooke Lynn Hytes has a purple outfit with a gold bra and a large blonde wig. Shuga Cain wears a brown-and-red outfit with gold earrings and a red wig. She removes the outer part of her outfit to reveal a colorful dress, which she removes to reveal a third look. Nina West has an Elizabeth Taylor-inspired pink-and-white outfit and a blonde wig.

== Reception ==
Kate Kulzick of The A.V. Club gave the episode a rating of 'B-'. Writing for Vulture, Matt Rogers rated the episode four out of five stars. Sam Brooks ranked the "No More Drama" performance number 119 on The Spinoff's 2019 "definitive ranking" of the show's 162 lip-syncs to date.
