= Queens Everywhere =

- RuPaul's Drag Race episode
- Episode no.: Season 11; Episode 12
- Original air date: May 16, 2019

Guest appearance
- Todrick Hall

Episode chronology
← Previous "Bring Back My Queens!"	Next → "Reunited"
- RuPaul's Drag Race season 11

"Queens Everywhere" is the twelfth episode of the eleventh season of the American reality competition television series RuPaul's Drag Race. It originally aired on May 16, 2019. The episode's main challenge tasks then contestants with writing, recording, and performing original verses to RuPaul's song "Queens Everywhere". Todrick Hall is a guest judge.

Vanessa Vanjie Mateo is eliminated from the competition after placing in the bottom and a losing a lip-sync contest against Brooke Lynn Hytes to "Pride: A Deeper Love" by Aretha Franklin.

== Episode ==
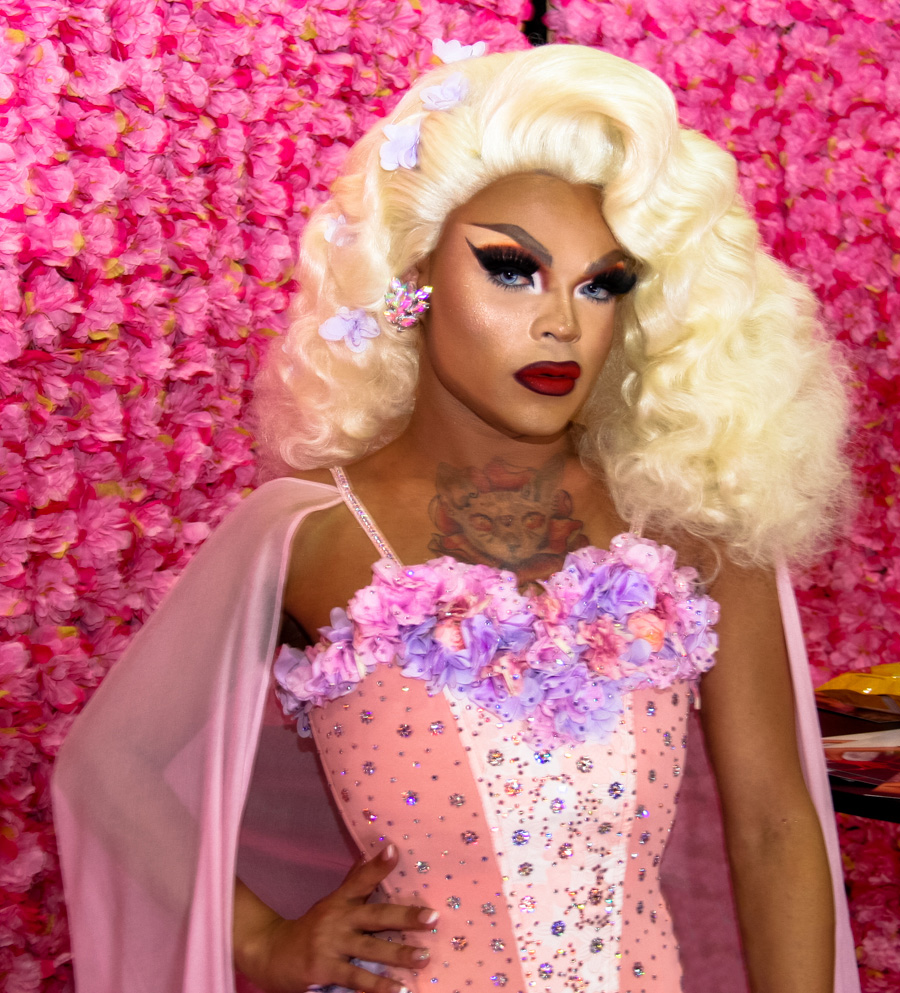
Vanessa Vanjie Mateo is eliminated from the competition.

The contestants return to the Werk Room after Nina West's elimination on the previous episode. On a new day, Michelle Visage greets the group and reveals the main challenge, which tasks the contestants with writing, recording, and performing original verses to RuPaul's song "Queens Everywhere". Visage shares that Todrick Hall will assist with choreography and that the contestants will appear on the podcast RuPaul: What's the Tee? with her and RuPaul.

The contestants work on writing lyrics, then record vocals with Hall and an audio engineer, as well as the podcast segments with RuPaul and Visage. The contestants then rehearse choreography on the main stage with Hall, an assistant, and backup dancers. Hall takes the group to the location of the final performance. On elimination day, the contestants make final preparations for the performance and fashion show. The group discuss their favorite moments from the season.

On the main stage, RuPaul welcomes fellow judges Visage, Ross Mathews, and Carson Kressley, as well as guest judge Hall. RuPaul shares the assignment of the main challenge, then the single-take performance commences. RuPaul shares the runway category ("Best Drag"), then the fashion shows commences. After the contestants present their looks, the judges deliver their critiques. RuPaul asks each contestants to offer words of wisdom to younger versions of themselves. The judges then deliberate and share the results with the group. A'keria C. Davenport, Silky Nutmeg Ganache, and Yvie Oddly move on to the finale. Brooke Lynn Hytes and Vanessa Vanjie Mateo place in the bottom and face off in a lip-sync contest to "Pride: A Deeper Love" by Aretha Franklin. Brooke Lynn Hytes wins the lip-sync and Vanessa Vanjie Mateo is eliminated from the competition. Vanessa Vanjie Mateo returns to the Werk Room to write a message on the mirror for the remaining contestants. Back on the main stage, RuPaul asks viewers to make their preferred winners known on social media.

== Production and broadcast ==
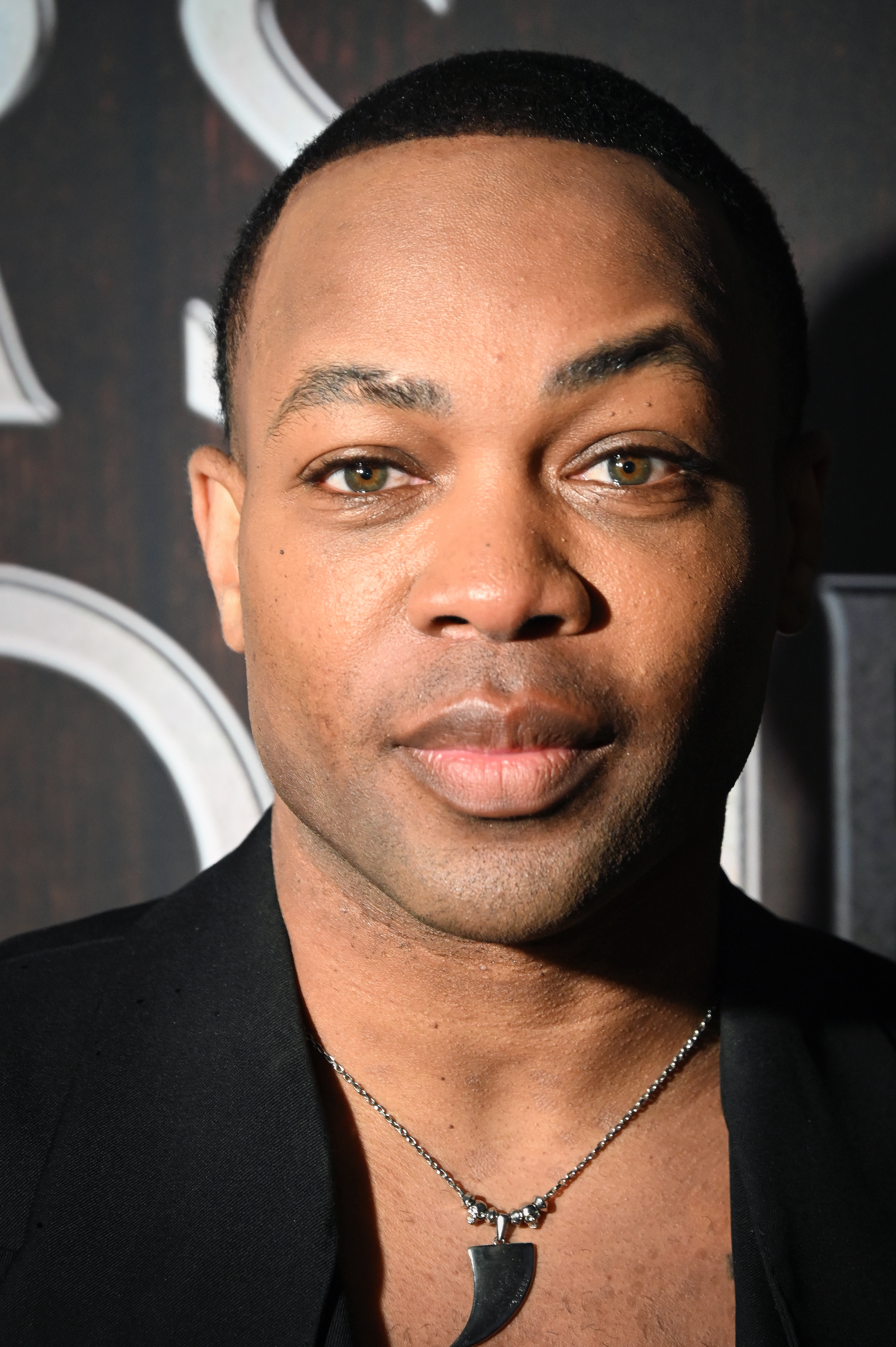
Todrick Hall (pictured in 2016) is a guest judge and choreographer.

The episode originally aired on May 16, 2019.

=== Fashion ===
For the main stage, RuPaul wears a purple dress with toile and a blonde wig. Hall and Kressley have white and green suits, respectively.

For the performance, A'keria C. Davenport wears a bodysuit with many silver chains. Brooke Lynn Hytes has a black outfit, tall matching boots, and a long blonde wig. Silky Nutmeg Ganache wears a red dress and a dark wig. Vanessa Vanjie Mateo has a colorful bodysuit, tall black boots, and matching gloves. Yvie Oddly wears a black outfit and a short red wig. The backup dancers have silver footwear.

For the fashion show, Brooke Lynn Hytes wears a ballerina outfit and a blonde wig with a headpiece. Silky Nutmeg Ganache has a nude illusion gown with pink swirls, as well as a corset and a blonde wig. Vanessa Vanjie Mateo wears a long green dress, black gloves, large earrings, and a dark wig. Yvie Oddly has a long maroon dress with matching gloves and braids. She has three eyes, three fingers on each hand, and three breasts. A'keria C. Davenport wears a blue gown with matching accessories and a blonde wig.

== Reception ==
Kate Kulzick of The A.V. Club gave the episode a rating of 'B'. Writing for Vulture, Matt Rogers rated the episode three out of five stars. Sam Brooks ranked the "Pride: A Deeper Love" performance number 80 in The Spinoff's 2019 "definitve ranking" of the show's 162 lip-sync contests to date.
