= 1 Queen 5 Queers =

Canadian television talk show

- Presented by: Brooke Lynn Hytes
- Country of origin: Canada

Original release
- Network: Crave
- Release: December 9, 2021 – September 1, 2022

1 Queen 5 Queers is a Canadian television talk show, which premiered on Crave in 2021. A revival of the 2009–2014 MTV Canada series 1 Girl 5 Gays, the series features a panel of LGBTQ people talking about LGBTQ issues, moderated by drag queen Brooke Lynn Hytes. According to Hytes, the series represents a broader and more diverse array of participants than the original, which focused almost entirely on the perspectives of gay men.

The series debuted on December 9, 2021. Panelists appearing on the series have included choreographer Hollywood Jade, comedian Tricia Black, actor and athlete Harrison Browne, fashion designer Isaac Mizrahi, advocate and dancer Raymond Johnson-Brown, and musician and writer Our Lady J.

In 2023, 1 Queen 5 Queers won the Canadian Screen Award for Best Talk Program or Series at the 11th Canadian Screen Awards. The series concluded its run in September 2022 after two eight-episode seasons, receiving praise for broadening the intersectional representation of Canada's LGBTQ+ community compared to its predecessor.
