= Vanessa Vanjie Mateo =

American drag queen

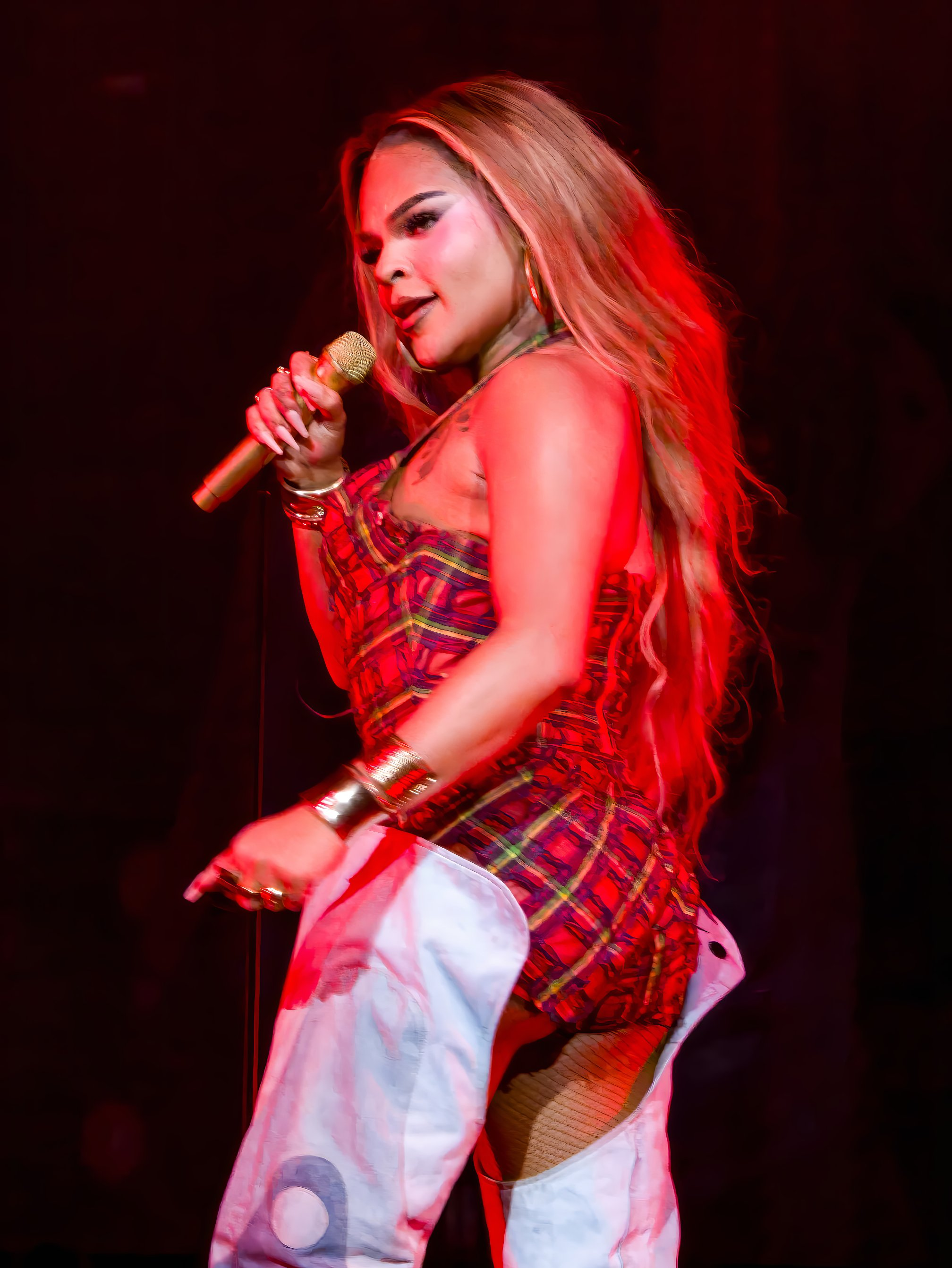
- Vanessa Vanjie performing with Werq the World 2025 at Caesars Windsor, Windsor, Ontario.
- Born: José Luis Cancel; Puerto Rico
- Occupation: Drag queen
- Known for: Competing on RuPaul's Drag Race
- Website: vanessavanjie.com

Vanessa Vanjie Mateo, sometimes known as Vanessa Vanjie, Miss Vanjie, or simply Vanjie, is the stage name of José Luis Cancel, an American drag performer known for competing on the tenth season of RuPaul's Drag Race and placing fifth on the eleventh season of the show. In addition to competing on Drag Race, she has also appeared in many of its spin-offs, including RuPaul's Secret Celebrity Drag Race, RuPaul's Drag Race: Vegas Revue, Canada's Drag Race, and RuPaul's Drag Race All Stars, the latter of which she appeared as a contestant for its ninth season, where she placed runner-up along with season five and All Stars 2 contestant Roxxxy Andrews.

== Early life ==
Vanjie Mateo was born in Puerto Rico and grew up in Kissimmee, Florida and Texas, and is of Puerto Rican descent. He started doing drag when Drag Race season three and All Stars alumna Alexis Mateo hired her as a backup dancer.

== Career ==
Vanessa Vanjie Mateo was announced as one of the fourteen contestants competing for the crown on the tenth season of RuPaul's Drag Race, which premiered on March 22, 2018. She was eliminated in the first episode, after lip syncing to Christina Aguilera's "Ain't No Other Man" against competitor Kalorie Karbdashian Williams, while Aguilera was the guest judge. As she walked backwards off the stage, her parting words were "Miss Vanjie... Miss Vanjie... Miss... Vanjie", which later became an internet meme. "Miss Vanjie" was tweeted by many, including several by RuPaul, as well as Michelle Visage and Kathy Griffin. The meme was also edited into clips of various movies, TV shows, and even on dating apps, with clips appearing in The Simpsons, Pokémon, Grindr, and The Shining.

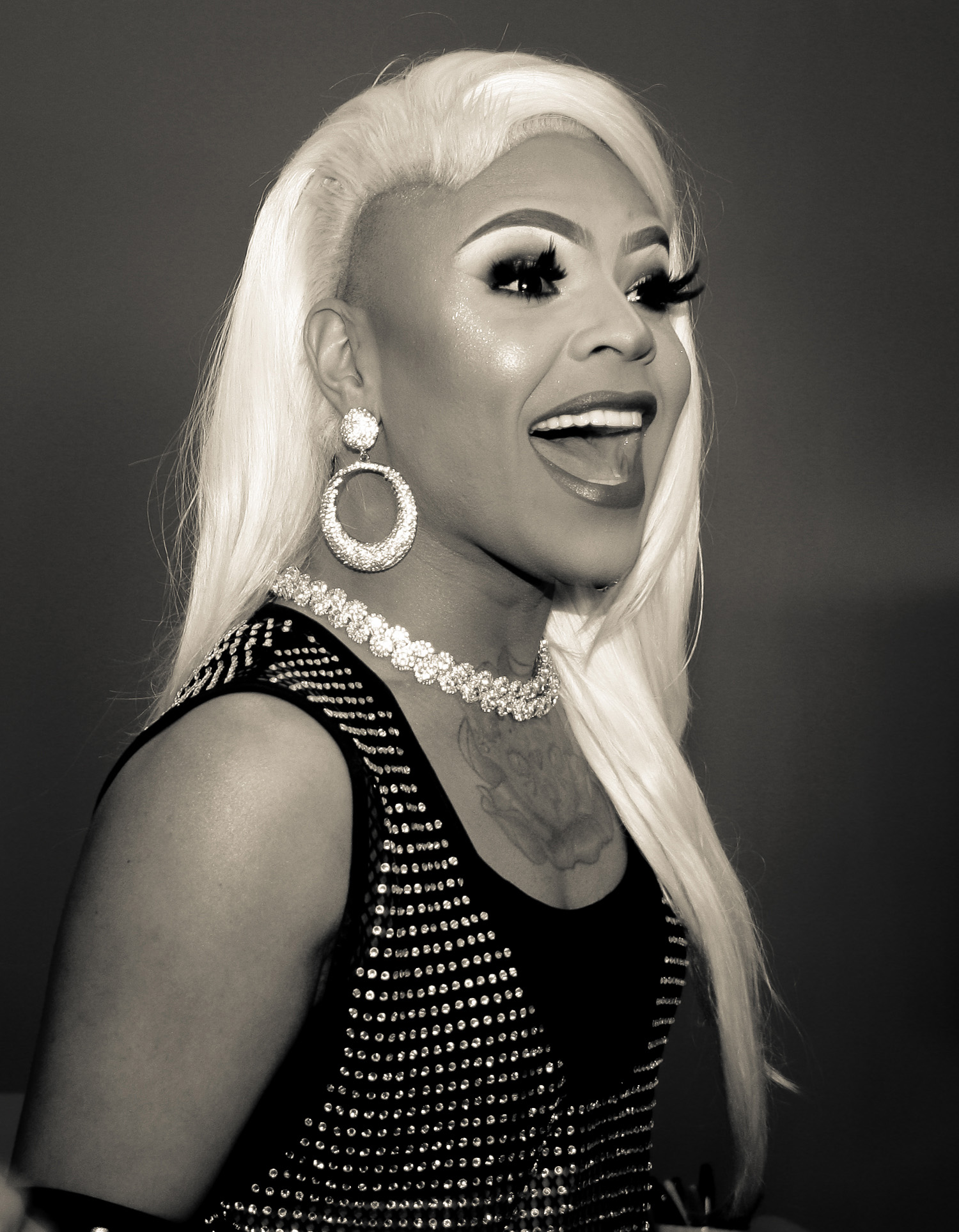
Vanessa Vanjie Mateo, 2019

The "Miss Vanjie" catchphrase was said by Rylan Clark-Neal while commenting on the Eurovision Song Contest 2018 first semi-final broadcast during the presentation of Eleni Foureira from Cyprus; he also said it in reference to Montenegro singer Vanja Radovanović, whose name resembles Miss Vanjie's. RuPaul wore a "Vanjie" necklace during the Time 100 Gala red carpet. The catchphrase was also referenced in multiple further episodes of Drag Race season ten. A Snapchat filter of Vanessa's runway look was made available the day after the season ten reunion.

On January 24, 2019, Vanessa Vanjie Mateo was announced as one of the fifteen competitors of season 11 of RuPaul's Drag Race. She was in the bottom two for episodes nine and ten, and won both lip syncs against Plastique Tiara and Shuga Cain. She was eliminated by Brooke Lynn Hytes in the penultimate week in episode twelve, and placed fifth. In Episode 5 of All Stars 5, she made a guest appearance as a "Lip Sync Assassin", where she lip-synced against Shea Couleé, but lost.

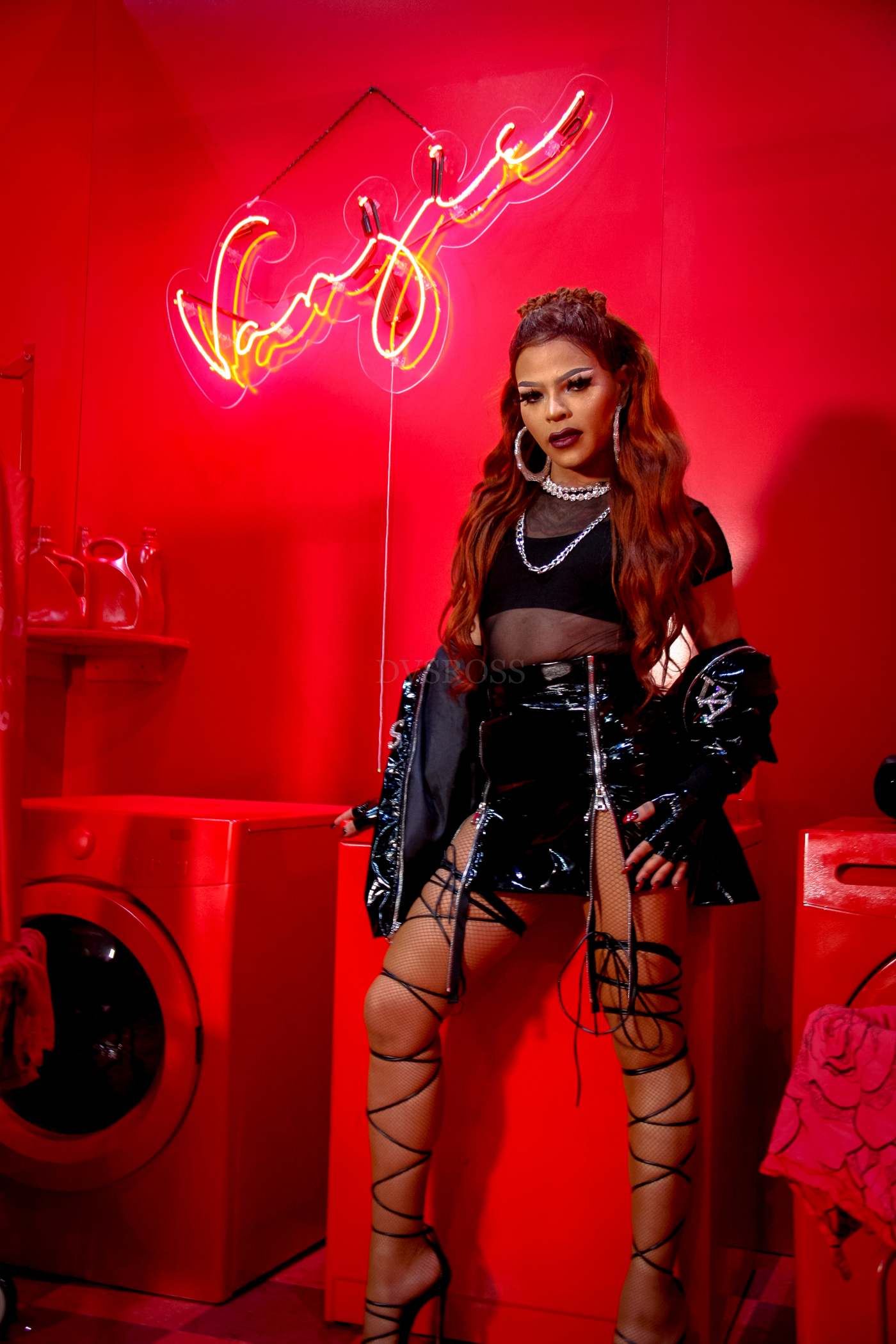
Vanessa Vanjie Mateo in 2019

Vanessa Vanjie Mateo was featured on the September 2018 issue cover of Gay Times. She appeared with Nina Bo'nina Brown for two episodes of the WOWPresents internet series "Fashion Photo RuView" on November 3 and 17, 2018, filling in for Raja and Raven. She appeared with Silky Nutmeg Ganache and Derrick Barry for an episode of the fourteenth season of Germany's Next Topmodel in 2019. On May 12, 2019, Vanessa Vanjie Mateo was sponsored by Chips Ahoy! for a social media post for Mother's Day, which got homophobic backlash.

On April 23, 2024, Vanessa Vanjie Mateo was announced as one of the eight contestants competing on the ninth season of RuPaul's Drag Race All Stars.

=== Music ===
Vanessa Vanjie Mateo released her first single, "I'm Vanjie", on June 21, 2018. She appeared in the music video for Iggy Azalea's "Sally Walker" on March 14, 2019. She performed as a backup dancer to the song on Jimmy Kimmel Live! in April 2019. Vanessa Vanjie Mateo was also in the video for Azalea's "Started" with Trixie Mattel.

== Filmography ==
=== Television ===
Year	Title	Role	Notes
2018	RuPaul's Drag Race	Herself	Contestant (14th place)
2018	RuPaul's Drag Race: Untucked	Herself	
2019	RuPaul's Drag Race	Herself	Contestant (5th place)
2019	RuPaul's Drag Race: Untucked	Herself	
2019	Jimmy Kimmel Live!	Herself	Backup dancer
2019	Germany's Next Topmodel	Herself	Guest
2020	AJ and the Queen	Herself	Guest appearance
2020	RuPaul's Drag Race	Herself	Guest
2020	RuPaul's Drag Race: Untucked	Herself	Guest
2020	RuPaul's Celebrity Drag Race	Herself	Mentor
2020	RuPaul's Drag Race All Stars	Herself	Lip Sync Assassin
2020	RuPaul's Drag Race All Stars: Untucked	Herself	Lip Sync Assassin
2020	RuPaul's Drag Race: Vegas Revue	Herself	
2022	All Star Shore	Herself	Contestant (Finalist)
2022	Canada's Drag Race (season 3)	Herself	Guest judge
2022	The Book of Queer	Herself	Episode: "Queens' Work Makes the Team Work"
2023	Drag Me to Dinner	Herself	Hulu original
2024	RuPaul's Drag Race All Stars	Herself	Contestant Runner-Up
2024	Everybody Still Hates Chris	Drag Queen (voice)	Episode: "Everybody Still Hates Bullies"

=== Music videos ===
Year	Title	Role
2019	Iggy Azalea – "Sally Walker"	Funeral attendee
2019	Iggy Azalea – "Started"	Real Estate Agent
2020	Yvie Oddly - "Hype"	Herself

=== Web series ===
Year	Title	Role	Notes	Ref.
2018, 2019	Queen to Queen	Herself	With Kalorie Karbdashian-Williams, later with Silky Nutmeg Ganache and A'keria C. Davenport	
2018, 2019	Countdown to the Crown	Herself	Season 10 and Season 11	
2018, 2019	Whatcha Packin'	Herself	Guest	
2018	Cosmo Queens	Herself	Cosmopolitan Series	
2019–2022	The Pit Stop	Herself	Guest, 2 episodes	
2019	Reading Queens	Herself	Episode: "Miss Vanjie"	
2019	Follow Me	Herself	Episode: "Miss Vanjie"	
2019, 2020	Be$tie$ for Ca$h	Herself	With Silky Nutmeg Ganache, later with Alexis Mateo	
2020	Silky's Snack Shack	Herself	Guest	
2020	Werq the World	Herself	Guest	
2021	Out of the Closet	Herself	Guest	
2022	Vanjie: 24 Hours of Love	Herself	Host	
2023	LGBTQ Herstory Month: Honoring Latinx Heroes	Herself	Web special	

== Discography ==
=== Singles ===
Year	Title
2018	"I'm Vanjie"
2019	"Queens Everywhere" with A'keria Davenport, Brooke Lynn Hytes, Silky Nutmeg Ganache, Rupaul, Yvie Oddly
2020	"Hype" with Yvie Oddly

== Awards and nominations ==
Year	Award ceremony	Category	Work	Results	Ref.
2019	People's Choice Award	The Competition Contestant of 2019	Herself	Nominated	
2023	Queerties Awards	Future All-Star	Herself	Nominated	
