= Brooke Lynn Hytes =

Canadian drag performer and professional dancer (born 1986)

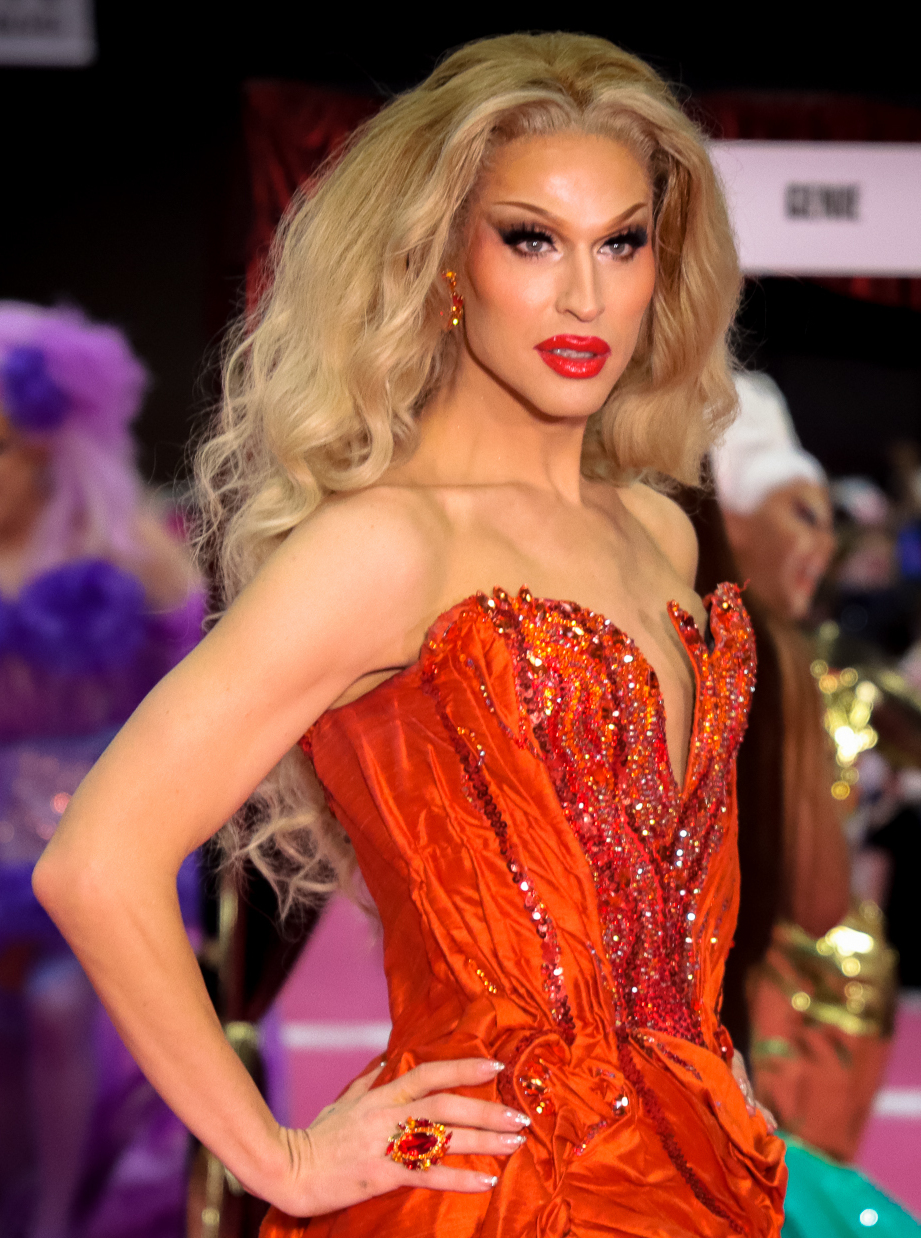
- Brooke Lynn Hytes at RuPaul's DragCon LA, 2023
- Born: Brock Edward Hayhoe; March 10, 1986 (age 40); Toronto, Ontario, Canada
- Citizenship: Canada; United States
- Education: National Ballet School
- Occupations: Drag queen; Ballet dancer; Performer; Television personality; Executive producer
- Years active: 1999–present
- Career
- Former groups: Cape Town City Ballet; Les Ballets Trockadero de Monte Carlo
- Known for: Miss Continental; RuPaul's Drag Race; Canada's Drag Race; 1 Queen 5 Queers
- Website: brookelynnhytes.com

Brooke Lynn Hytes is the stage name of Brock Edward Hayhoe (born March 10, 1986), a Canadian-American drag queen, ballet dancer, and television personality. After working as a dancer with Cape Town City Ballet and Les Ballets Trockadero de Monte Carlo, Brooke Lynn Hytes began to perform in drag, competing in several pageants, winning the Miss Continental title in 2014. Brooke Lynn Hytes achieved international recognition for competing on the eleventh season of RuPaul's Drag Race, where she finished as a runner-up to winner Yvie Oddly. Brooke Lynn Hytes is the first Canadian to compete in the series. Since 2020, Brooke Lynn Hytes has been a main judge on the spin-off series Canada's Drag Race, and is the first Drag Race contestant to become a full-time judge in the franchise.

== Early life ==
Hayhoe was born on March 10, 1986, in Toronto. He attended high school at Etobicoke School of the Arts. When he was 15, he was accepted into the National Ballet School of Canada, where he trained for five years. As a student, he worked with the choreographers Jiri Kylian, Toer van Schayk, James Kudelka, and Rudi van Dantzig, who cast him as Death's Angel in a mounting of Four Last Songs. Hayhoe danced this role in Toronto and later in Cape Town.

== Career ==
In 2006, at 20 years old, Hayhoe moved to South Africa and joined the corps de ballet of the Cape Town City Ballet. In 2007, he was promoted to the rank of soloist. While in Cape Town, he danced several of the major classical principal male roles, including the Nutcracker Prince in The Nutcracker, Solor in La Bayadère, and Albrecht in Giselle.

Hayhoe was more interested in dancing en pointe than in the traditional male roles. He moved to New York City in 2008 in order to join the drag ballet troupe Les Ballets Trockadero de Monte Carlo. He toured internationally with the Trocks for four years under the names "Andrei Verikose", as a male dancer, and "Vanya Verikosa", his ballerina alter ego.

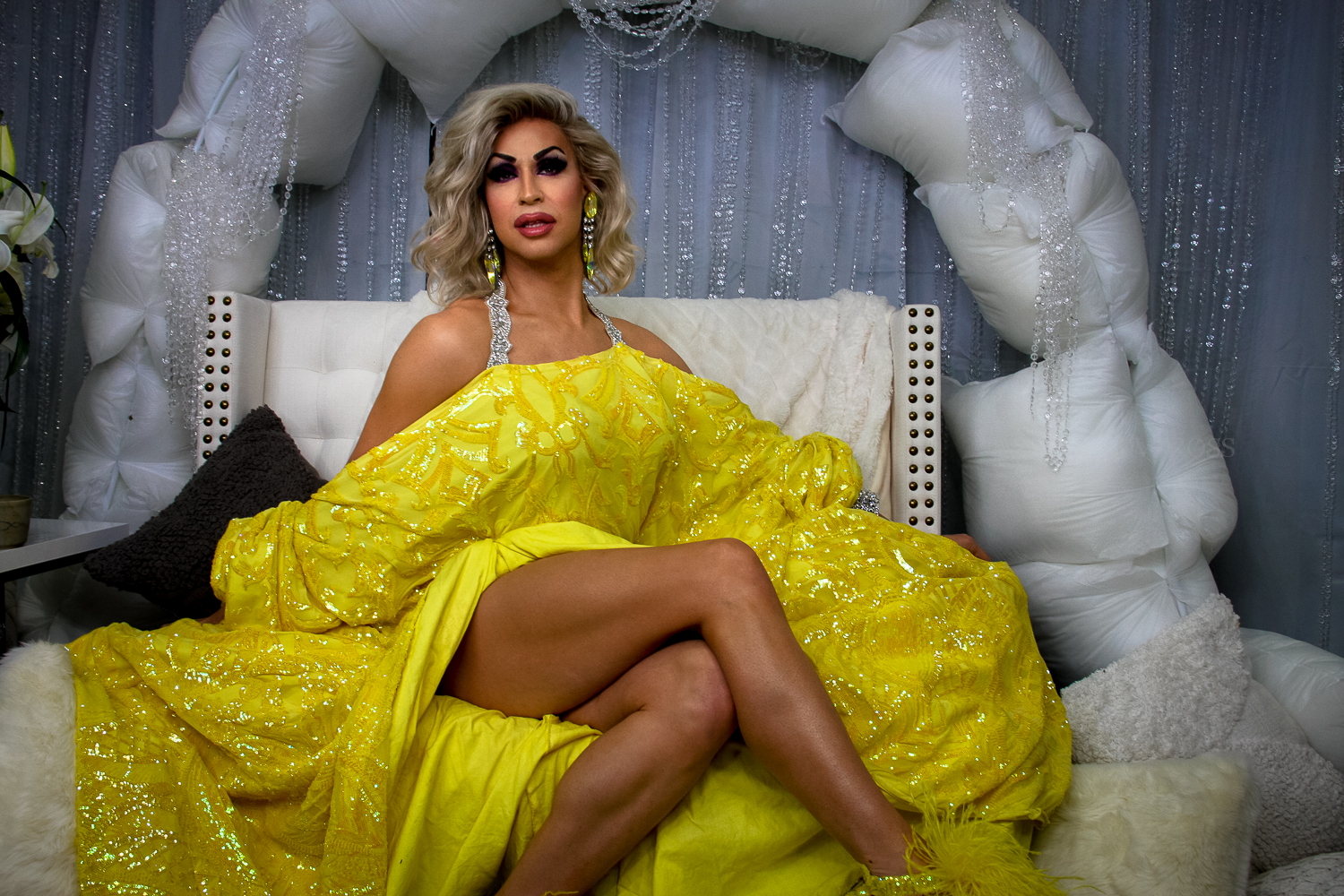
Brooke Lynn Hytes at RuPaul's DragCon LA in 2019

As a drag queen, Hayhoe initially tried out the names Jackie D, Carmen and Bianca. After moving back to Toronto to pursue drag full-time, he was adopted by local queen Farra N. Hyte, who named her new drag daughter Brooke Lynn Hytes. Shortly after returning to Toronto, Brooke Lynn Hytes won a local drag pageant called Queen of Halloween, and quickly began to attract attention in the Toronto drag scene. Brooke Lynn Hytes began to regularly compete on the drag pageant circuit. In 2013, she won Miss Gay Toronto, Derby City Entertainer of the Year, and Miss Michigan Continental, and placed as first alternate in the National Entertainer of the Year and Miss Continental pageants on first entry. In 2014, Brooke Lynn Hytes won the prestigious Miss Continental title. In 2015, Brooke Lynn Hytes accepted a residency as a performer in PLAY Dance Bar in Nashville, Tennessee. She auditioned for the ninth and tenth seasons of RuPaul's Drag Race, but was unable to join either season as she did not yet have a green card.

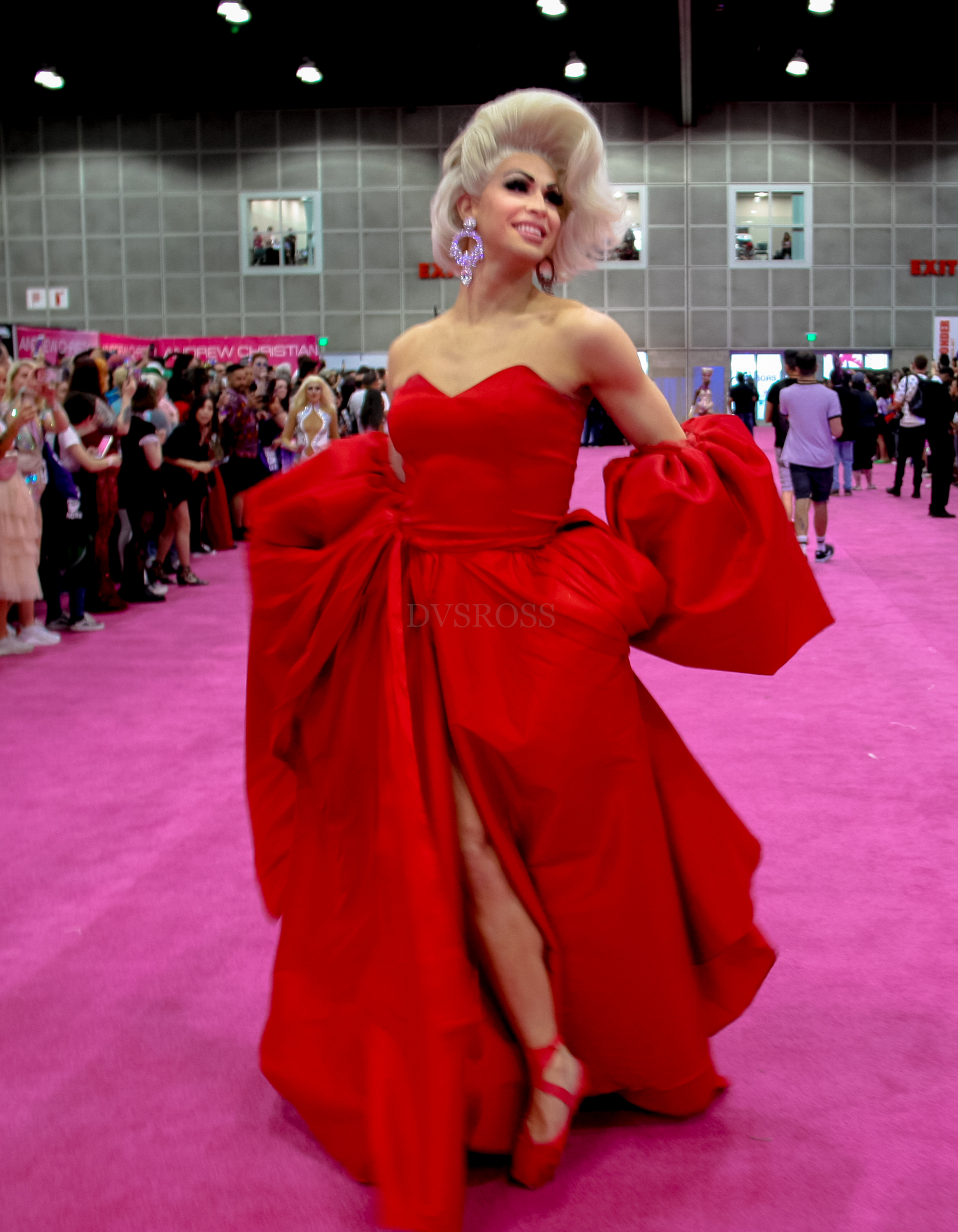
Brooke Lynn Hytes at RuPaul's DragCon LA, 2019

Brooke Lynn Hytes was announced to be one of fifteen contestants competing on season eleven of Drag Race on January 24, 2019. She won the main challenges in episode one, five and eleven, placing in the top of a challenge a record-breaking nine times throughout the season. This was the most top 3 positions achieved by any contestant in a single season in RuPaul's Drag Race history, until Jane Don't achieved ten top placements in season eighteen (2026). She was in a "double-shantay" alongside Yvie Oddly in the Snatch Game episode after bombing her Celine Dion impersonation; the duo's lip sync to Demi Lovato's "Sorry Not Sorry" was lauded over by critics, and declared by many to be one of the best lip syncs in the history of the series.

Throughout the season, Brooke Lynn Hytes developed an on-show romance with Vanessa Vanjie Mateo, dubbed "Branjie". The two placed in the bottom two of episode twelve, with Brooke Lynn Hytes emerging victorious in a lip sync battle to Aretha Franklin's "A Deeper Love", making Vanessa Vanjie Mateo the last queen to be eliminated prior to the finale. Brooke Lynn Hytes finished as a runner-up, ultimately losing to Yvie Oddly in the final lip sync for the crown. In June 2019, Brooke Lynn Hytes was one of 37 queens to be featured on the cover of New York magazine. On November 11, she won a People's Choice Award for "Most Hypeworthy Canadian".

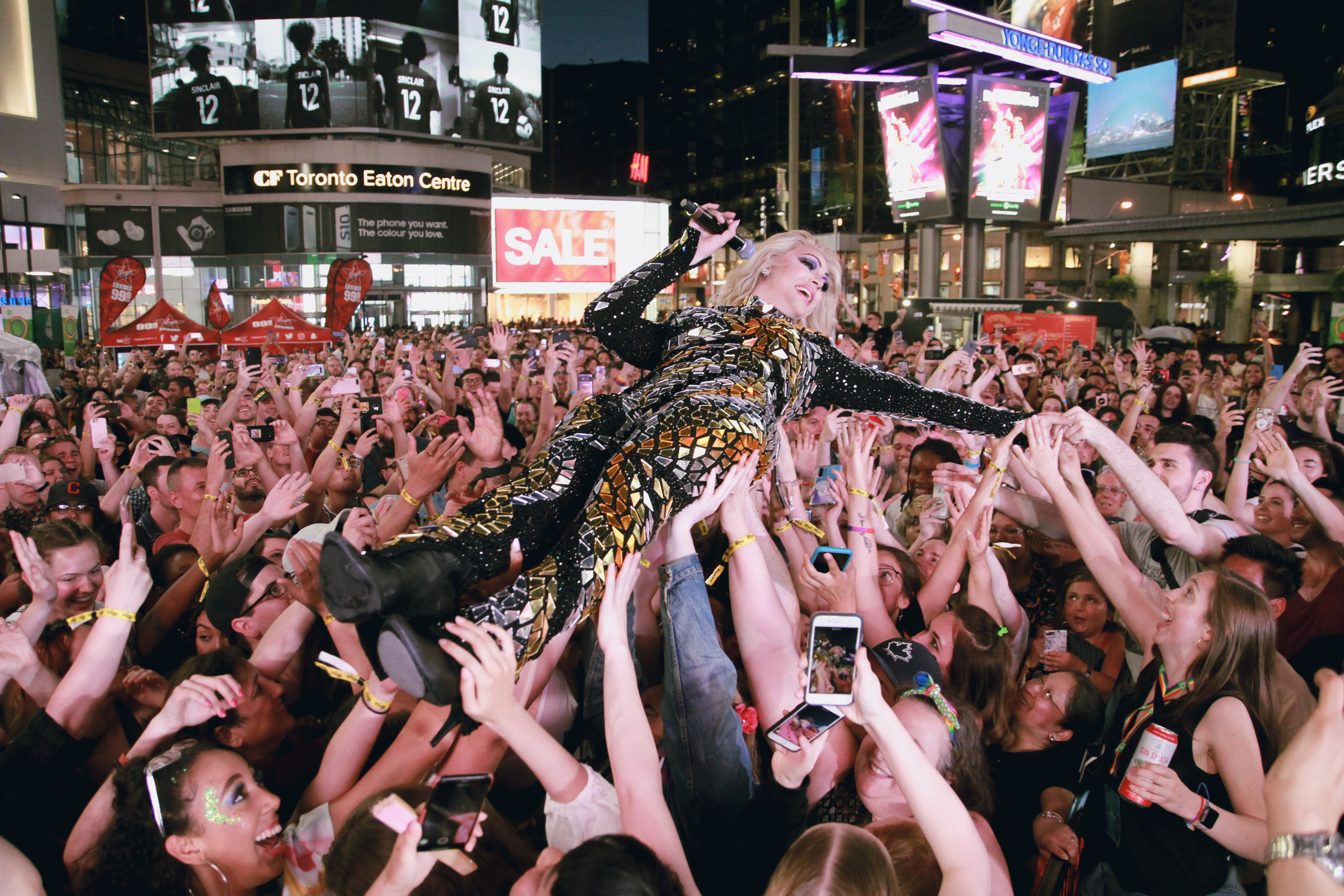
Brooke Lynn Hytes performing at the Toronto Drag Ball on June 22, 2019, during Pride weekend in Toronto

On September 26, 2019, Brooke Lynn Hytes was announced as a full-time judge for Canada's Drag Race, the Canadian spin-off of RuPaul's Drag Race. She was the first contestant from any series in the Drag Race franchise to become a full-time judge. As of 2024, Brooke Lynn Hytes is the only judge to have appeared on all four seasons of Canada's Drag Race, as well as its spin-off, Canada's Drag Race: Canada vs. the World. She and her fellow judges have won three Canadian Screen Awards for Best Host or Presenter in a Factual or Reality/Competition Series, in 2021, 2022, and 2023 respectively.

On March 25, 2021, Brooke Lynn Hytes released a single featuring Priyanka, the winner of Canada's Drag Race season one, titled "Queen of the North". She has since expressed her dislike of the single, and her reluctance to release any more music. In May 2021, Brooke Lynn Hytes launched a podcast with Priyanka, Famous This Week, and was announced as the host of 1 Queen 5 Queers, a reboot of 1 Girl 5 Gays, for Crave. The second season of 1 Queen 5 Queers premiered in 2022.

In June 2021, Brooke Lynn Hytes appeared as a "lip-sync assassin" on the sixth season of RuPaul's Drag Race All Stars, and lip-synced to the song "Miss You Much" by Janet Jackson against contestant Ra'Jah O'Hara, one of her former Drag Race competitors. The result of the lip-sync was declared a draw. In May 2022, Brooke Lynn Hytes appeared alongside Vanessa Vanjie Mateo in Bluebella's Pride Month lingerie campaign.

Brooke Lynn Hytes continues to make international club appearances, and regularly tours alongside other Drag Race alumni. In 2019 she joined the Voss Events RuPaul's Drag Race Season Eleven tour, which visited seventeen cities across North America. In 2020 she hosted a tour for the Canada's Drag Race season one queens, which played exclusively in drive-in venues due to the COVID-19 pandemic. In 2022 she hosted the Canada's Drag Race Tour again, headlined by the season two queens. In 2024, she is scheduled to co-host the Canada's Drag Race Tour alongside Jaida Essence Hall, headlined by the season three and four queens. In 2020, 2021, 2022, and 2023, Brooke Lynn Hytes joined the annual Murray & Peter tour A Drag Queen Christmas, branded as the longest-running drag queen tour in America.

== Personal life ==
Hayhoe came out as gay when he was 18. After his stint on RuPaul's Drag Race, Hayhoe moved first to Los Angeles, where he took over Bianca Del Rio's old apartment, and then to Chicago. On May 22, 2023, via his Instagram page, Hayhoe posted a photograph showing both a Canadian and an American passport, thus confirming he had become a naturalized U.S. national.

== Titles awards ==
Year	Pageant	Placement	Ref
2013	Miss Gay Toronto	Winner	
2013	Miss Canada Ultimate	Winner	
2013	Derby City Entertainer of the Year	Winner	
2013	National Entertainer of the Year	1st Alternate	
2013	Miss Michigan Continental	Winner	
2013	Miss Continental	1st Alternate	
2014	Miss All Star Continental	Winner	
2014	Miss Continental	Winner	
2015	Miss Gay Orlando	Winner	
2016	Miss Sweetheart International	Winner	
2017	Miss Gay Heart of America	1st Alternate	
2018	Miss Gay America	1st Alternate	
2019	Rupaul's Drag Race	Runner-up	

== Filmography ==
=== Film ===
Year	Title	Role	Notes	Ref.
2014	Seek	Drag Queen		
2020	The Queens	Herself	Documentary	
2021	The Bitch Who Stole Christmas	Kitty Meow		
2026	Stop! That! Train!	Amber		

=== Music videos ===
Year	Title	Artist	Role
2016	"Receiver"	Ice Cream	Herself
2020	"Good as Hell (Brazilian version)"	Lizzo	Herself
2020	"Always (Drag Star Official Video)"	George Michael, Mary J. Blige, Waze & Odyssey, Tommy Theo	Herself
2020	"Hype"	Yvie Oddly (ft. Vanessa Vanjie Mateo)	Herself
2020	"Drag Queens"	Monique Samuels	Herself
2021	"G.A.P (Official Video)"	Heidi N Closet (ft. Widow Von Du)	Herself
2021	"Queen of the North"	Brooke Lynn Hytes (ft. Priyanka)	

=== Television ===
Year	Title	Role	Notes
2015	OUTspoken Biography	Herself	Guest (Episode: "Snow Queen: An Exposé of Drag in Canada")
2018	Ozzy & Jack's World Detour	Herself	Guest (Episode: "Grand Ole Osbournes")
2019	RuPaul's Drag Race	Contestant	Season 11, Runner-up (14 episodes)
2019	RuPaul's Drag Race: Untucked	Herself	Season 10 (12 episodes)
2020–present	Canada's Drag Race	Host	Season 1 – present; also Main judge
2021	RuPaul's Drag Race All Stars	Herself	Season 6, Guest/"Lip Sync Assassin" (Episode 2: "The Blue Ball")
2021	RuPaul's Drag Race All Stars: Untucked	Herself	Season 3 (Episode 2)
2021–2022	1 Queen 5 Queers	Host	Also Executive producer
2022	Trixie Motel	Herself	Guest (Episode 8: "Pride Grand Opening")
2022	RuPaul's Secret Celebrity Drag Race	Herself	Season 2, Mentor/"Queen Supreme" (8 episodes)
2022–present	Canada's Drag Race: Canada vs. the World	Host	Season 1 – present; also Main judge
2026	Canada's Drag Race All Stars	Host	Also main judge

=== Web series ===
Year	Title	Role	Notes	Ref.
2016	US of Aurora	Herself	Episodes 1, 3, 4, 6	
2019	Follow Me	Herself	Episode: "Mayhem Miller"	
2019	Whatcha Packin'	Herself	Guest	
2019	Countdown to the Crown	Herself	Season 11	
2019	Queen to Queen	Herself	With Yvie Oddly, Nina West	
2019	Ca$tmate$ for Ca$h	Herself	Guest with A'keria Davenport	
2020–23	The Pit Stop	Herself	Guest	
2020	TERRELL: Drunk Games with Brooke Lynn Hytes!	Herself	Guest	
2021	Out of the Closet	Herself	Episode: "Home of the Queen of the North"	

== Discography ==
=== Singles ===
Year	Title
2021	"Queen of the North" (featuring Priyanka or The Cast of Canada's Drag Race Season 2)

== Awards and nominations ==
Year	Award	Category	Work	Results	Ref.
2019	People's Choice Awards	Most Hypeworthy Canadian	Herself	Won	
2020	The Queerties	Future All-Star	Herself	Nominated	
2021	Canadian Screen Awards	Best Host or Presenter, Factual or Reality/Competition	Canada's Drag Race	Won	
2022	Canadian Screen Awards	Best Host or Presenter, Factual or Reality/Competition	Canada's Drag Race	Won	
2023	Canadian Screen Awards	Best Host or Presenter, Factual or Reality/Competition	Canada's Drag Race	Won	
2024	Canadian Screen Awards	Best Host or Presenter, Factual or Reality/Competition	Canada's Drag Race: Canada vs. the World	Won	
2025	Canadian Screen Awards	Best Host in a variety, lifestyle, reality/competition, or talk program or series	Canada's Drag Race	Won	
2026	Canadian Screen Awards	Best Host or presenter, factual or reality/competition	Canada's Drag Race	Won	
