= Headpiece =

Object worn on the head for decoration or protection

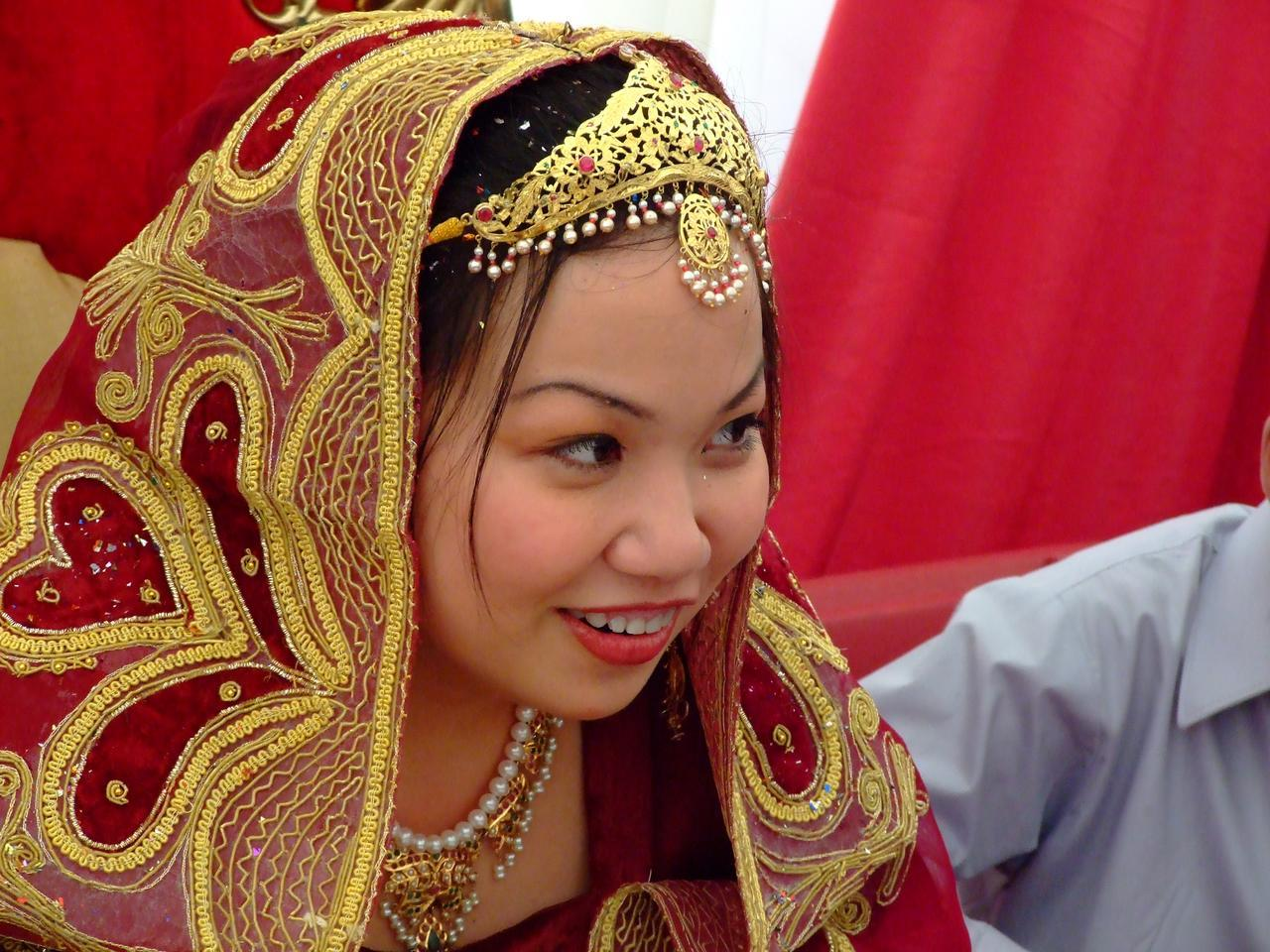
South Asian headpiece

A headpiece is an object worn on the head for decoration or protection.

Headpiece may refer to:

- A typically thin metallic crown, headband, or tiara worn around the forehead. Commonly worn by ancient rulers, such as Cleopatra, headpieces usually carry some emblem of religious or political significance.
- A beaded or woven meshwork, often fringed, and worn covering the hair – fascinator.
- The part of a dance or theatrical costume that is worn on the head.
