= Honey Davenport =

American drag performer and recording artist (born 1985)

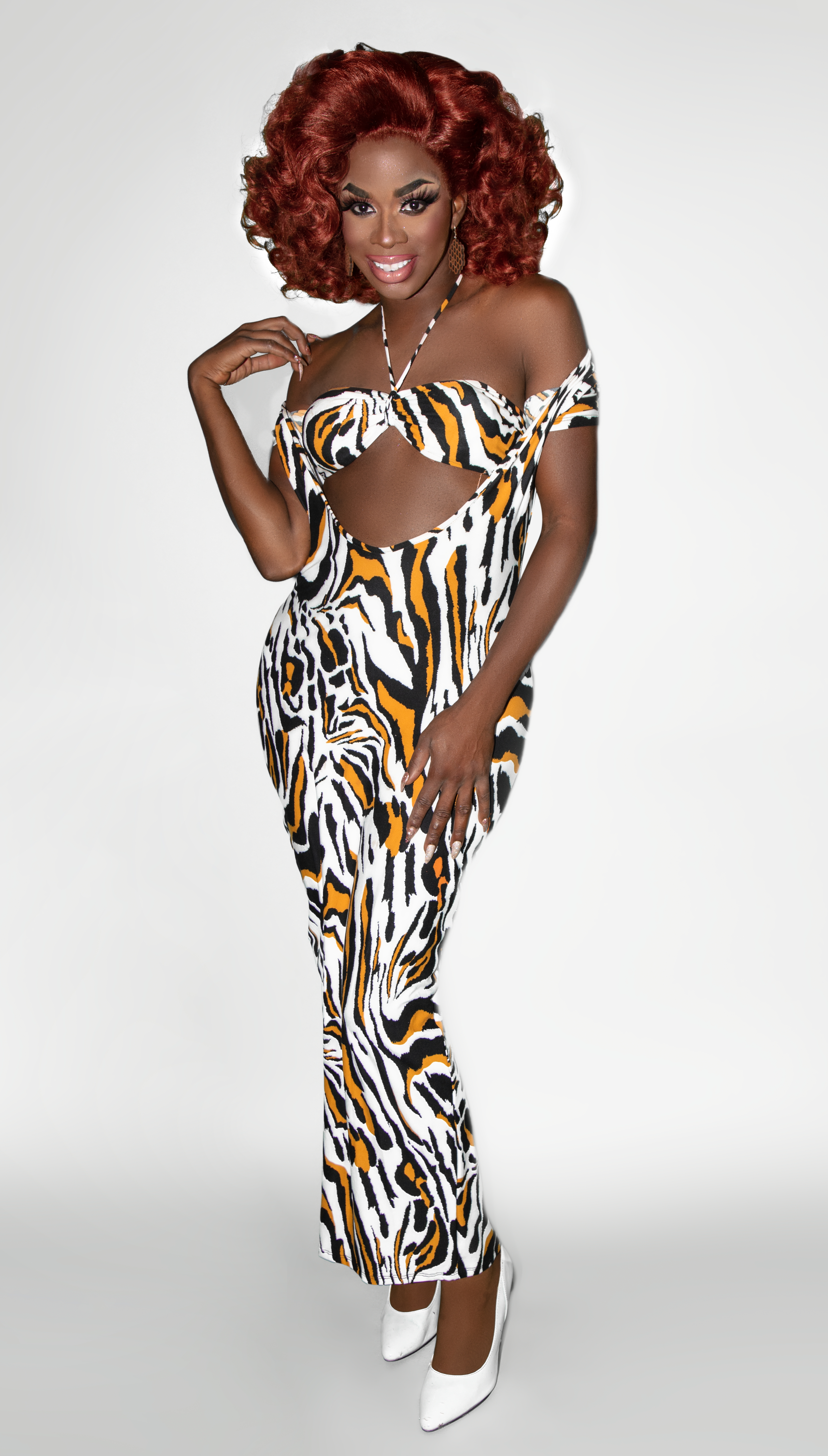
- Davenport in 2020
- Born: James Clark; August 13, 1985 (age 41); West Philadelphia, Pennsylvania, U.S.
- Other name: Sir Honey Davenport
- Occupations: Drag queen; singer; disc jockey
- Years active: 2008–present
- Known for: RuPaul's Drag Race (season 11)
- Spouse: John Heath-Clark (m. 2012)
- Relatives: Lee Daniels (cousin)
- Musical career
- Genres: Electronic; synth-pop
- Instrument: Vocals
- Label: Chew Fu

James Heath-Clark (born August 13, 1985), known professionally as Honey Davenport, is an American drag performer, singer, songwriter, actor and activist. Davenport was a longtime fixture of the New York City nightlife scene and came to international attention as a contestant on season 11 of RuPaul's Drag Race. Born in West Philadelphia, Heath-Clark attended college for musical theatre in New York, where he began his career as a backup dancer for Peppermint. He later established his own dance group, The Hunties. After taking up drag, Davenport became active in the pageant circuit of that community, winning 18 titles between 2013 and 2018. In 2013, she and her band, Electrohoney, released an eponymous album and starred in a live rock opera called The Electric Highway. She also performed in two off-Broadway shows, The Orion Experience (2013) and Trinkets (2017–2018). In the latter, she played the leading role.

While her season of Drag Race aired in 2019, Davenport released singles and music videos off of her debut EP, Raw and Unfiltered. Since then, she has launched a solo musical career; embarked on domestic and international tours; and appeared as both a host and a guest on web series about drag, culture and current events. In the second half of 2019, she starred in two off-off-Broadway shows: Raw and Unfiltered, a live adaptation of her EP, and Stocking Stuffer: A Christmas Show with Balls, a holiday-themed performance. In early 2020, she and Aja released "Draw the Blood", a song whose accompanying music video marked her first directorial credit. Since the start of the COVID-19 pandemic, Davenport has produced more songs, music videos and web content, sometimes in collaboration with other artists. Her second EP, Love Is God, was released in January 2022, and she followed this with a single and music video titled "Mighty Legendary" in 2023. In film, she co-starred in God Save the Queens, a feature-length picture that debuted at the Palm Springs International Film Festival in January 2023.

Davenport centers most of her art on social justice themes. She was motivated to take up political activism for a number of reasons: losing family and friends to gun violence as a child, being the victim of police brutality as a young adult, and experiencing incidents of racism throughout life. She has also been vocal about transgender rights, especially within the drag community. In October 2018, Davenport attracted national media attention for quitting her longtime job as a show host at The Monster, a Manhattan gay bar, in protest of racism she encountered there.

== Early life ==
Philly is such a musical place. I remember growing there. I went to the schools where I took classes from people like Floetry. When I first started writing, I used to go to First Fridays in Old City and do spoken word at the Painted Bride when I was in high school. That helped me develop as a songwriter, too, because poetry transfers into my songwriting. Philly, I was made there, so it has a lot to do with everything that is great about me.

— Heath-Clark, in an interview with Philadelphia Gay News

Heath-Clark was born James Clark on August 13, 1985, in West Philadelphia. He was raised primarily by his mother, who taught him to express his feelings by rapping. Of his early years, he said, "I grew up ... in the projects, and I lost countless family members and friends to gun violence. I have been held at gunpoint more than once. It's the world I grew up in, [guns] were so easily accessible to my friends and to my enemies."

Affected by those experiences and by racism he encountered, Heath-Clark began writing poetry about social justice when he was 10 years old. Also interested in music, he was a member of his church choir and started writing songs at 13. He practiced boxing as a childhood hobby and took up spoken word poetry as a teenager. In high school, he was in the Junior Reserve Officers' Training Corps (JROTC), where he achieved the rank of squadron commander and served as captain of his rifle team. While attending the Pennsylvania Governor's School for the Arts when he was 15, Heath-Clark and a female friend went to a "come as you are not" party costumed as one another; he cites this as his first time dressing in drag. At 17, he moved to New York City to study musical theatre at the American Musical and Dramatic Academy. For a time, he lived in Harlem, on the same block as Drag Race season 6 contestant Vivacious, season 2 contestant Sahara Davenport and season 9 runner-up Peppermint.

=== Path to drag ===
After college, Heath-Clark was in the cast of the Broadway national tour of Hairspray. It was there that he had his first experience with drag as a performance art, and this motivated him to subsequently take up work as a backup dancer for Peppermint for four years. He also danced in music videos for Sherry Vine. In anticipation of a month-long tour of Europe with Peppermint in 2008, Heath-Clark decided to earn spending money for his travels by putting on dance shows with a friend; the two called their act The Hunties. To encourage people from the drag community to attend their shows, they incorporated elements of drag into their routines. After his friend left to pursue other endeavors, Heath-Clark decided to continue performing alone as a drag queen. Shortly before the group disbanded, he met RuPaul at a book signing, where the latter misheard the name of The Hunties and made out an autograph to "Honey". From this, Heath-Clark took Honey as his drag name, adopting the Davenport surname from his drag mother, Lady Deja Davenport, who had recently begun mentoring him. His neighbor Sahara Davenport, who had the same drag mother as Deja and was therefore his drag aunt, also taught him tricks of the trade. He credits both Sahara and her partner, Manila Luzon, as teachers who influenced his style. He cites Kevin Aviance, Phylicia Rashad and Beyoncé as artistic inspirations. Heath-Clark's first performance in drag was on April 20, 2008, and his first paid appearance as Honey Davenport was at a show with Bob the Drag Queen. Early in his career, when his aesthetic was more androgynous, Heath-Clark went by the name Sir Honey Davenport. He dropped the "Sir" as his look became more feminine.

== Career ==
=== Nightlife and pageantry ===
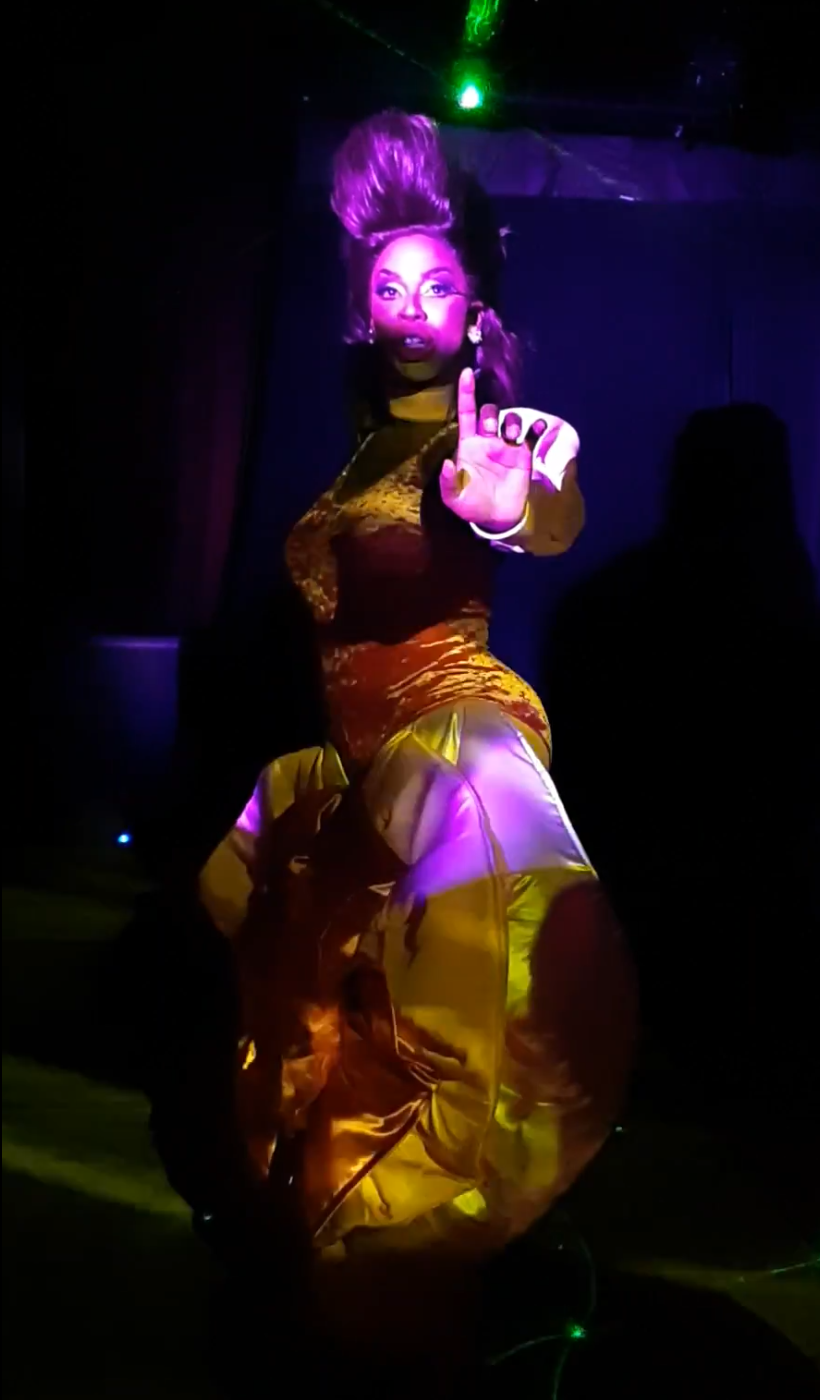
Davenport performing a lip sync in New York in 2019

Davenport has hosted regular drag shows in New York City, in New Jersey, on Fire Island and in Key West. She also works as a DJ. For her contributions to queer New York City nightlife, she has received six Glam Awards—prizes à la the Oscars issued to members of that community in an annual ceremony. The categories she has won include Club Party of the Year (2017), Door Goddess (2017 and 2018), Best Hostess (2019) and Best Video (2020). She was also named Music Artist of the Year at the 2020 edition of GIANT Fest, a queer music festival in Brooklyn.

Prior to appearing on Drag Race, Davenport was a frequent competitor in drag pageants, where she amassed a total of 18 titles by 2018. The first pageant she ever competed in was Miss Stonewall, which she attempted four times before winning in 2015. Fourteen of her victories fell in the three-year period between 2013 and 2016. Notable among these was the national crown of Miss'd America 2015. Concurrent with that reign, she held seven other titles. In February 2018, Davenport won the Miss Paradise pageant in Asbury Park, New Jersey. She had been performing at Paradise, the nightclub that hosts that pageant, since Sahara Davenport first brought her there years earlier.

=== Early music, theatre and television work ===
In the early 2010s, Davenport fronted Electrohoney, a synth-pop band that released an eponymous album in 2013. Shortly after the album's completion, the band created and starred in The Electric Highway, a live, interactive rock opera featuring a soundtrack of their songs. Set in 2092 New York, The Electric Highway's narrative focuses on Davenport (playing herself) as she embarks on a quest to become a legend. The production explores themes related to gender and sexuality in a dystopian future. All three members of Electrohoney—Davenport, SteveX and Jesse Gray—as well as Deja Davenport, Sherry Vine and Jeremy Xtravaganza, played major roles. J. C. Alvarez of EDGE Media Network reviewed the show favorably, also noting that its opening night suffered from technical problems. Of the musical as a whole, he said, "What Electrohoney and company deliver with their musical rock-opera is a joyful reminder of the creativity that once thrived on the Lower East Side's underground club scene of the 80's, which disappeared into the mass consumer-driven 90's, and totally vanished during the height of the AIDS epidemic."

"Indestructible" (2013)
Clip of "Indestructible", released as a single off Electrohoney's 2013 album

In summer 2013, Davenport acted in the off-Broadway show The Orion Experience, a sci-fi musical directed by Travis Greisler and set to a glam rock soundtrack by The Orion Experience. In its plot, that band's lead singer, Orion Simprini, goes on an intergalactic journey wherein he encounters various fantastical characters, including Davenport in her role of The Queen of White Lies. The play was well received both by critics and by the audience. A Theater Mania review summarized the show as being "like Here Lies Love or Fuerza Bruta, but with robots and space aliens instead of Filipina dictators or sexually ambiguous Argentineans." Greg Solomon of Theasy.com wrote, "The Orion Experience would appeal to anyone who is out to have a good time, regardless of their walk of life. The age range [of the audience] was from early 20s to late 70s and no one seemed out of place. The only complaint I can muster is that it could have lasted longer." Both The Electric Highway and The Orion Experience ran at the XL Nightclub in New York City.

In 2015, Davenport and Orion collaborated again, this time producing a single called "T.R.O.U.B.L.E". The same year, she appeared on an episode of Watch What Happens Live with Andy Cohen as a Whitney Houston impersonator. From 2017 to 2018, Davenport had the leading role in Trinkets, an off-Broadway play about the lives of transsexual sex workers in Manhattan's Meatpacking District in the 1990s. She portrayed Diva, a veteran prostitute who takes another character under her wing. The show was directed by Paul E. Alexander of The Ones, also starred Kevin Aviance, and ran at the Gene Frankel Theatre. Reviews were mixed: Adrienne Sowers of The Reviews Hub criticized Trinkets as lacking energy and plot cohesion, but she said the script had promise. Gay City News called the play "an ultimately euphoric but often sobering musical that shines a well-lit, long-overdue spotlight on drag and transsexual prostitutes during an era of uneasy cultural visibility".

=== RuPaul's Drag Race ===
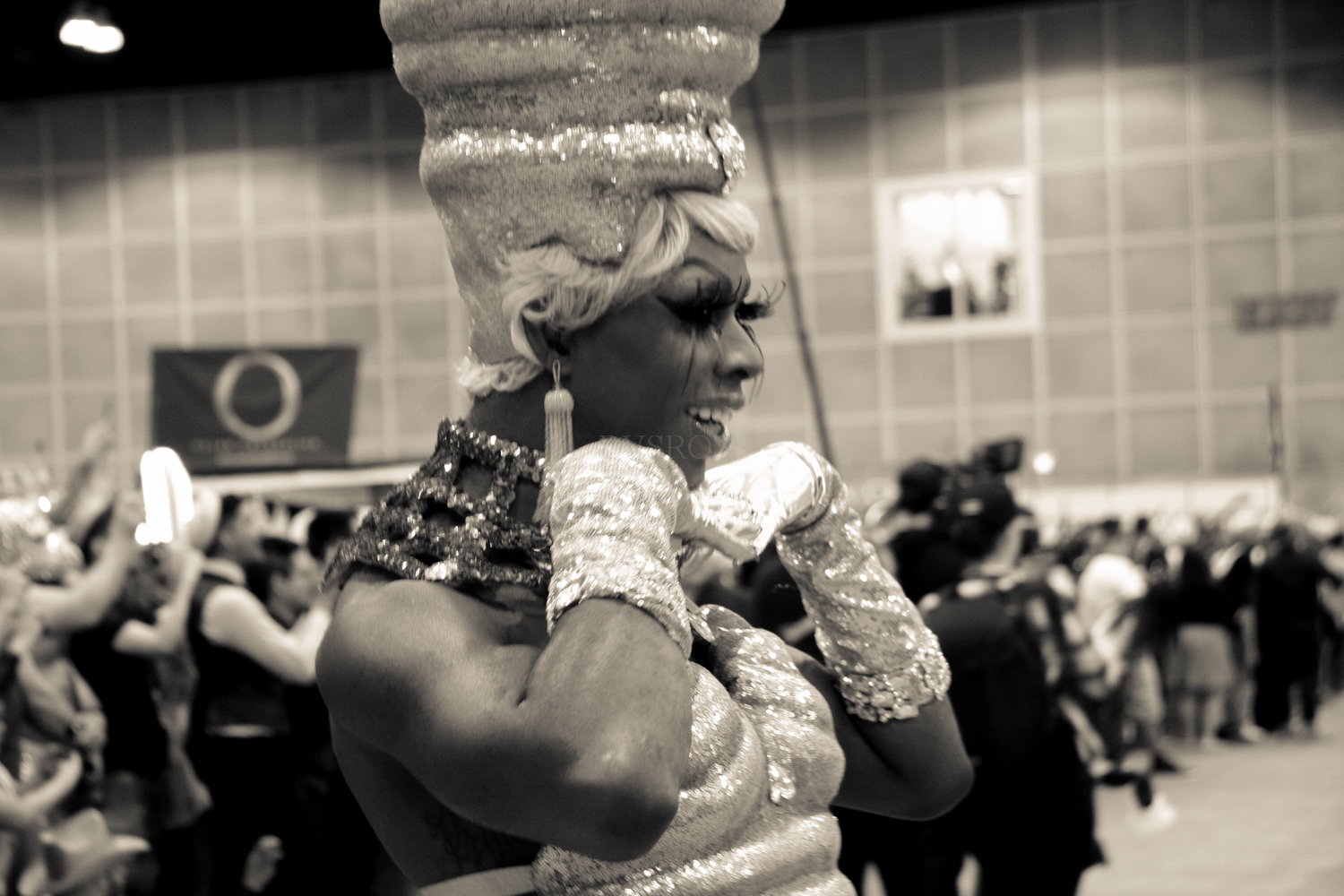
Davenport at RuPaul's DragCon LA 2019

After auditioning for RuPaul's Drag Race eight times, Davenport was selected as one of 15 contestants for the show's 11th season, which premiered on February 28, 2019. The invitation to compete came at a difficult time for her: she was homeless and having troubles in her marriage, and one of her mentors was in a coma. She borrowed about $20,000 from friends in order to commission the runway outfits she brought to the competition. For the season's first main challenge, a photo shoot, she was paired with her mentor Manila Luzon, who placed as runner-up on the third season of Drag Race and competed on the first and fourth seasons of RuPaul's Drag Race All Stars. Davenport was eliminated in the series' first-ever six-way Lip Sync for Your Life, exiting in season 11's third episode as the 13th-place finisher.

One of Davenport's drag daughters, Monét X Change, competed on the 10th season of RuPaul's Drag Race and won the fourth season of RuPaul's Drag Race All Stars. Two of Davenport's drag aunts have also appeared on the show: Sahara Davenport, who competed on season 2 of the regular series, and Kennedy Davenport, who competed on season 7 of the regular series and placed as runner-up on season 3 of All Stars. Fellow season 11 contestants Ra'Jah O'Hara and A'keria C. Davenport are also members of the Davenport drag family.

=== Raw and Unfiltered ===
"Cocoa Butter" (2019)
Clip of "Cocoa Butter", the penultimate track on Raw and Unfiltered

Davenport's 2019 visual EP, Raw and Unfiltered, treats the subject of being a queer person of color in America. It was produced by Chew Fu. Davenport released each of the songs from Raw and Unfiltered during the airing of Drag Race season 11; the corresponding music videos showcase the looks she would have worn in the episodes following her elimination from the show. The first single and video combination off the EP, titled "The Hive", came out during the second week of the season. Davenport co-wrote "The Hive" with Jayse Vegas, a frequent collaborator who has featured her in his own songs and music videos. The fifth track on Raw and Unfiltered, "Cocoa Butter", was co-produced by Davenport; Vegas; Will Sheridan; Nedra Belle (of The Voice season 13); and Kareem McJagger, another longtime collaborator who is also Davenport's drag daughter. The video for "Cocoa Butter" won a Glam Award. The final track on Raw and Unfiltered, "Worship Me", was written by Orion Simprini. In July 2019, Davenport performed a theatrical concert adaptation of Raw and Unfiltered at the Laurie Beechman Theatre, an off-off-Broadway venue in Manhattan. The show had a three-date run.

=== 2019: Post-Drag Race endeavors ===
In spring 2019, Davenport released the first season of her weekly YouTube series and podcast, Da Fuq. That May, she released "Stan for You", a Pride-themed single and music video featuring Drag Race season 11 winner Yvie Oddly. Over the summer, she participated in the RuPaul's Drag Race Season 11 Tour, performing around the U.S. with other competitors from her season. She had an out-of-drag cameo role in Eureka O'Hara's August 2019 music video "Pretty Hot and Tasty". The first week in September, Davenport was featured on the cover of Get Out! Magazine. The issue included a piece she wrote about the life changes she underwent after Drag Race. Around the same time, she appeared in the music video for Lovari and Adam Barta's song "No Day Like Today".

Davenport traveled to Australia in October 2019 to partake in Pride events and raise awareness for queer people of color on that continent. In an interview with DNA magazine, she said, "It is really important to me that my people are represented all over the world. People of colour are a part of every community not just in America and the people here are just as important to me as the ones back home." During the visit, she appeared at the first-ever Black Pride Awards in Cairns, becoming the first RuPaul's Drag Race alumna to perform in that city. After the activism leg of her trip, she joined six other Drag Race season 11 contestants and season 2 runner-up Raven for The Sickening Ball tour, a Halloween-themed drag production with stops in Australia and New Zealand.

In November 2019, Trustpilot, a consumer review website, unveiled an ad campaign featuring Davenport on billboards and in a commercial. In the campaign, a female monarch resembling Queen Elizabeth II purchases jewelry online, guided by Davenport's product review. Later that month, Davenport and Peppermint served as guest panelists on the VH1 online miniseries Black Girl Beauty. The series takes the form of a round-table discussion that "gives celebrities, influencers and VH1 stars an opportunity to have their say on issues that define [b]lack women's beauty". During the 2019 holiday season, Davenport starred in Stocking Stuffer: A Christmas Show with Balls, her second one-woman show at the Laurie Beechman Theatre. Its closing night was held at Club Cumming. On Christmas Eve 2019, she released a single called "Present (Tie You Down)".

=== 2020–2021: Music and online content during the COVID-19 pandemic ===
- The music video for "Draw the Blood" marked Davenport's directorial debut.
- "Draw the Blood" music video

In February 2020, Davenport and Aja released "Draw the Blood", a collaborative single whose music video marked Davenport's first directorial credit. The song, which debuted at number 26 on iTunes, focuses on the danger of bystander inaction in the face of racism, and its video features the personal experiences of Davenport and those close to her. The title references a metaphor indicating that those who do not intervene when they witness injustice have blood on their hands. Aja and Davenport each penned portions of the track, and Kareem McJagger wrote the hook. The video was included in Entertainment Weekly's "fabulous collection of the RuPaul's Drag Race queens' best music videos".

The second season of Da Fuq premiered in April 2020. The same month, Jayse Vegas featured Davenport in a remix of his song "Energy", and Mo Heart featured her in the music video "Hot Sauce and High Heels (Kinky Boots Remix)". In May 2020, Billboard called Davenport's performance at RuPaul's Digital DragCon one of the seven best moments of the event. In June, she was featured in Socia(Lites)'s music video "Bitch Got Hips". Later that month, she debuted "Digital Rainbow", a single about celebrating Pride in the midst of the COVID-19 pandemic. The track features Oddly, Vegas, Widow Von'Du and Cazwell. Both the song and its accompanying music video were produced while Davenport and the featured artists were in quarantine; each person recorded their portion of the sound and video at home, and the clips were stitched together in post-production.

In August 2020, Davenport appeared in "Nerves of Steel", a music video by the English synth-pop duo Erasure. The video is a mashup of clips of prominent drag queens and other queer performers lip-syncing the song's lyrics. Later in the summer, she served as assistant director for Shuga Cain's September 2020 music video "Sweet Love". Because filming was completed in person during the pandemic, the video's cast is mostly masked. Shortly thereafter, Davenport re-released "Warrior", the second single off of Raw and Unfiltered, together with a full-length music video filmed in front of a green screen during quarantine. The video accompanying the song's initial release had been shorter due to budgetary restrictions.

In October, the cast of Shooting Star – A Revealing New Musical featured Davenport, Alaska Thunderfuck and Miss Coco Peru in a music video medley "to raise COVID-19 relief aid for Broadway Cares/Equity Fights AIDS and Pineapple Support". The same month, Davenport appeared in Divas for Democracy: United We Slay, a digital variety show featuring Broadway names like Chita Rivera and Harvey Fierstein as well as Drag Race stars including Bianca Del Rio, Jinkx Monsoon and Jujubee. The show encouraged Americans to vote in the 2020 United States presidential election. Shortly before Halloween, Davenport and Loris (of The Boulet Brothers' Dragula) released a collaborative single and music video called "Freaky Planet".

As of February 2021, Davenport hosted a monthly Twitch show called Something of a Different Color, which featured a cast of POC performers. The third season of Da Fuq premiered in May of that year.

=== 2022–present: Love Is God, God Save the Queens and other projects ===
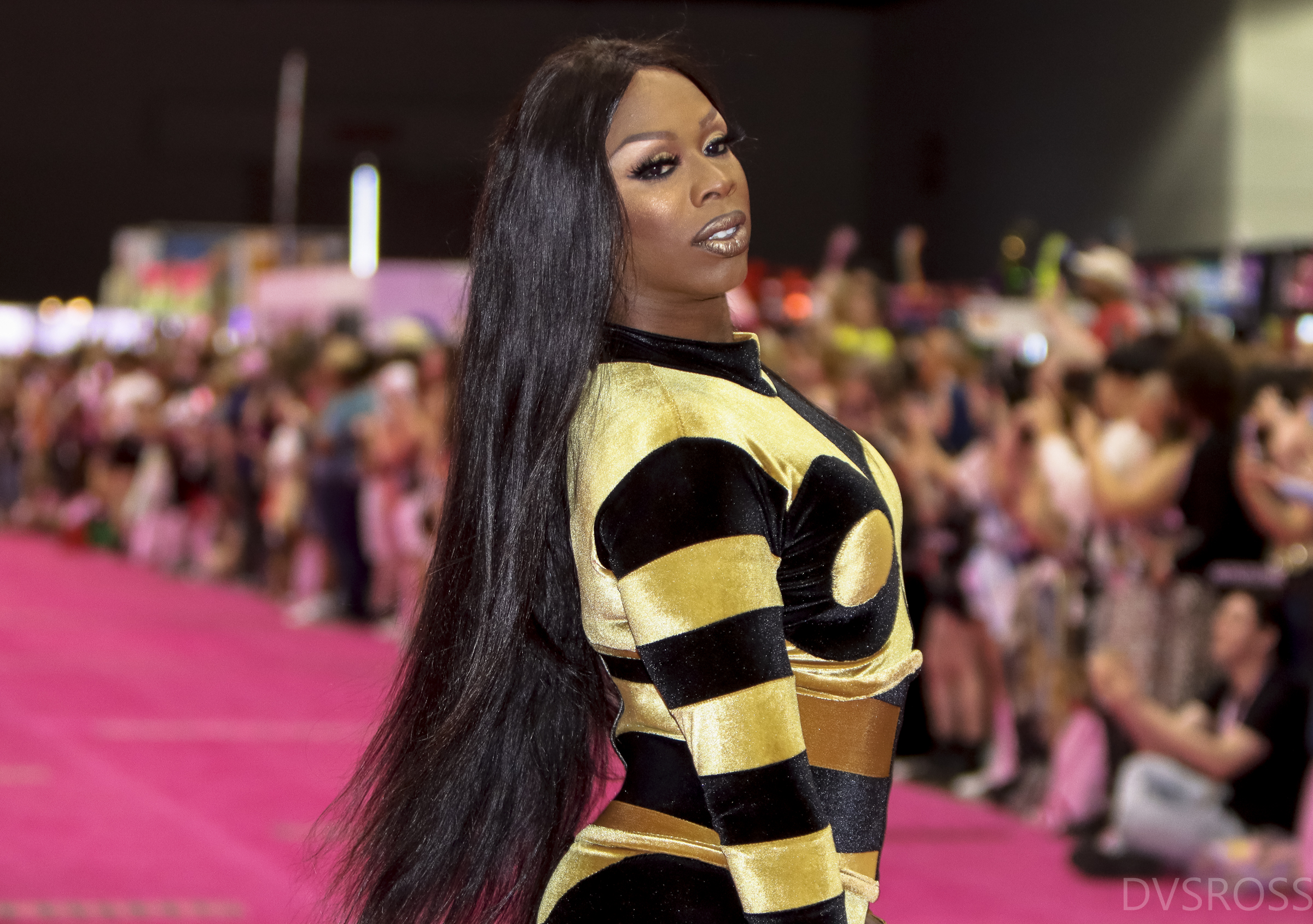
Honey Davenport at RuPaul's DragCon LA 2022

In November 2021, Davenport and Manila Luzon released a collaborative single and music video called "Love Is God", the first song off of Davenport's five-track EP of the same name, which debuted in January 2022. Love Is God spans genres including pop, disco, house and reggaeton, and it features collaborations with Kevin Aviance, LaLa Ri, Jackie Cox and Tammie Brown. The music video for "Thrive", the track with Aviance, was released together with the EP. A short musical film titled Love Is God: The Visual Album, consisting of "a story woven together by all the songs on the EP", was scheduled to come out later in 2022. Davenport directed the film.

Davenport co-starred (as herself) in God Save the Queens, a feature-length film that premiered at the Palm Springs International Film Festival in January 2023. The film "[follows] three different Drag Queens, in LA, New York and Las Vegas, all navigating their way through their careers and personal struggles".

In June 2023, Davenport debuted a single called "Mighty Legendary". A "Legends Only" remix of the song, featuring Alaska Thunderfuck, was released with an accompanying music video in September of that year. The video, sponsored by the online PrEP provider Mistr, was partially filmed at the Trixie Motel.

In May 2026, Davenport won the International Mr. Leather competition in Chicago, Illinois.

== Activism ==
What I wish I had more opportunity to do was show the world that my drag is not just about being beautiful or ferocious. It's really social commentary. I create things that speak to the world I wanna see.

— Davenport, in an interview with the Houston Chronicle

Davenport has said that it is important to her to use her career in drag to help others, and she often bases her looks, performances and music on political themes. In an interview with Entertainment Weekly, she stated, "I like to use my drag as a platform for the voiceless; for women, people of color, and those who aren't being heard." She further said to KCRW that drag has "become a protest, because now when I go to work, I'm doing this in spite of what might happen to me". Davenport has been particularly outspoken about racial equality and gun control, motivated by the impact that racism and gun violence have had on her life since childhood.

In November 2018, Davenport led the We Vote parade, a procession through New York City that encouraged Americans to vote in the 2018 midterm elections. The final runway look she wore on Drag Race was an homage to an outfit Lady Gaga wore while performing "Angel Down", a tribute to Trayvon Martin. In fall 2019, Davenport and other former Miss'd America titleholders spoke out against the pageant's decision to introduce a rule banning trans women from competing. Davenport told Instinct magazine:

Being Miss'd America is one of my favorite accomplishments. I enjoyed being able to stand for a community in need, and being able to use my art to help the LGBT folks of Atlantic City. While I will forever be moved and appreciative of the work done by the Greater Atlantic City LGBT Alliance [the charity that organizes the pageant], I no longer agree with some of the policies of the Miss'd America Pageant. ... It has taken me some time, but have [sic] decided I can no longer support them while that policy is in place. I want it to be clear that this is no boycott; I will no longer be a a [sic] judge and won't be a part of crowning, but I am going to support my friends competing. I know how much being Miss'd America cultivated the queen I am today, and I want that for all of my sisters.... I believe every member and supporter of the LGBT community should be able compete for this prestigious title.

On the subject of Drag Race's lack of trans contestants, Davenport said, "[I]t is all of our responsibility to deal with that. I don't think that it's wise for us to point the finger. It's Drag Race's opportunity to accept trans people, but it's all of our social obligation to create this platforms [sic]."

At the start of the 2020 George Floyd protests, Davenport teamed up with two fellow New York City drag queens, Dèvo Monique and Marti Gould Cummings, to ask every queer venue in the city to pledge to hire more black staff and entertainment. In a June 2020 interview, she described an incident in which she was subjected to police brutality in Harlem. She said that roughly ten years earlier (c. 2010), she had been on her way to the supermarket when she was apprehended by police officers, thrown to the ground, and handcuffed. One officer placed a knee on her neck while another searched her. When they did not find anything on her person, they told her they had stopped her because her profile matched a description they had received. Davenport asked the officers if they would apologize for what they had done to her, and they replied, "You should be happy you're not going to jail today." The event served as one of the inspirations for "Draw the Blood", which features a reenactment of Davenport's encounter with the police in its music video.

On Easter Sunday in 2023, Davenport and Drag Race season 14 contestant Kerri Colby performed at Drag March Los Angeles, a demonstration organized by the Los Angeles LGBT Center against anti-LGBT legislation.

=== Monster Bar controversy ===
In September and October 2018, Davenport was at the center of a controversy over racist practices at The Monster, a popular gay bar in New York City's West Village, where she had hosted a weekly show called "Manster" for six years. The incident began in late September 2018, when bar manager Italo Lopez sent text messages to Davenport's manager, DJ Mitch Ferrino, indicating that a flyer for "Manster" appeared to be promoting a "black night" and that this was bad for business. Lopez also said that the two black dancers on the flyer needed to be replaced by someone "beautiful" and that the image of Davenport herself needed to be smaller. After Ferrino showed Davenport the messages, she reached out to bar owner Charles Rice with concerns about the overtones of Lopez's words, but Rice did not respond. Following this, on September 29, 2018, Davenport appeared at "Manster" as planned. However, instead of performing, she announced she would no longer be able to work at The Monster. She shared what Lopez had said with the audience and ended her two-minute speech by stating, "I cannot be a part of this anymore. If you don't want my people at the party, I won't be here."

Shortly thereafter, a number of other drag queens canceled their regular shows at The Monster. Ferrino also withdrew his weekly event LookQueen, which was started in 2014 by Bob the Drag Queen, from the bar. LookQueen's acting host, Shuga Cain, had urged Ferrino to do so. Rice initially blamed Ferrino and Davenport for the backlash he experienced, calling the incident a smear campaign that he ascribed to Ferrino "[having] an axe to grind with [Lopez]". He further stated that he believed Ferrino should not have shown Lopez's messages to Davenport, chalking up their content to a miscommunication stemming from Lopez's non-native English. Later on, Rice apologized, and Lopez resigned from his position. Rice arranged for staff at The Monster to undergo racial sensitivity training, but he declined Davenport's invitation to have a moderated public discussion about the matter.

== Personal life ==
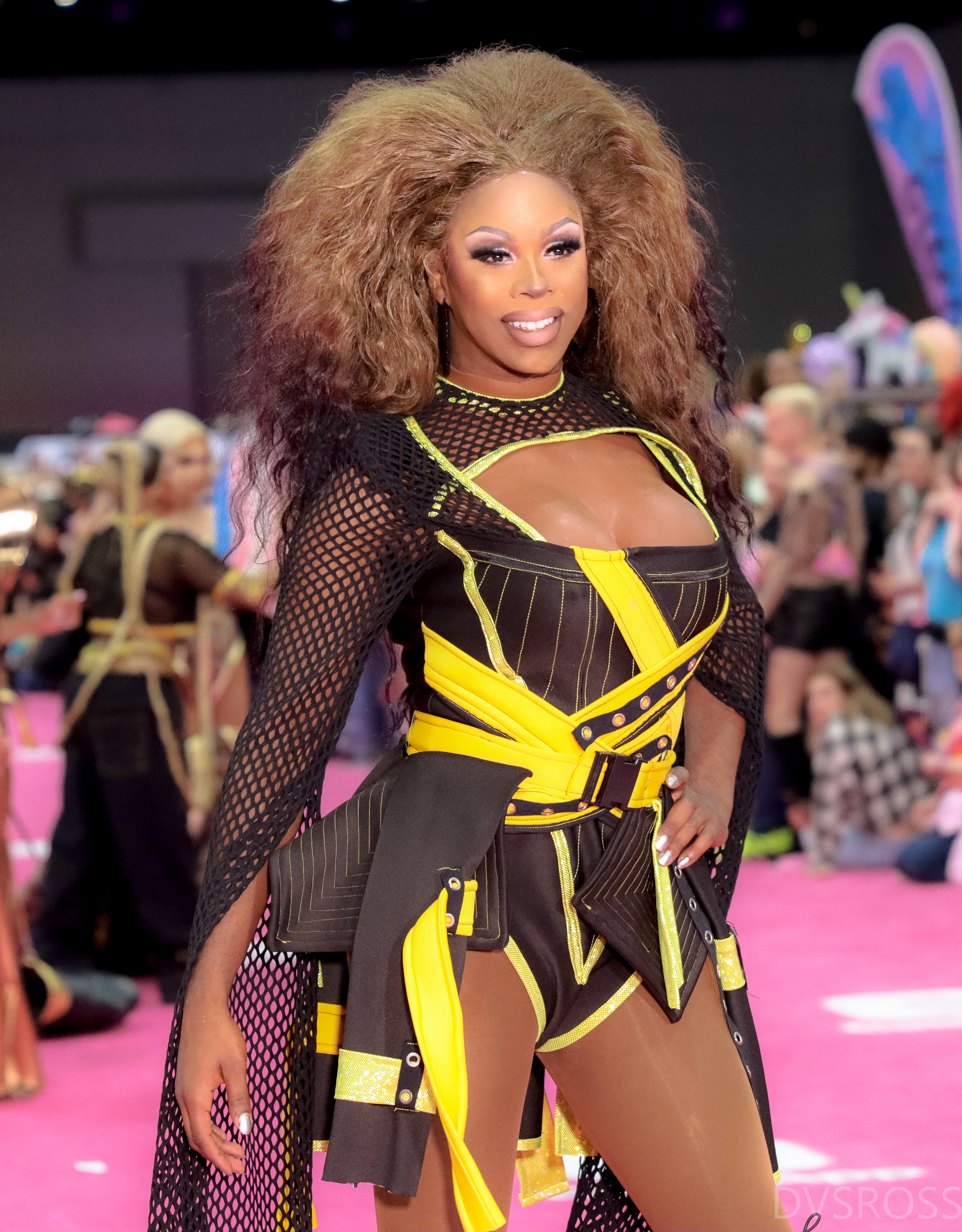
Honey Davenport at RuPaul's DragCon LA 2023

Having known he was gay for most of his life, Heath-Clark said, "The first person I ever came out to was my godfather and math teacher—my Uncle John. He overheard me in the classroom being attacked for my sexual orientation, and afterwards, he promised me that even if what he heard was true, he would always have my back." Heath-Clark came out to his mother at age 19, when he called her to talk after breaking up with his first boyfriend. Her response was supportive. Though she embraced him as a gay man, she was initially unhappy with his decision to pursue drag, but she changed her mind after seeing him perform. Heath-Clark's father learned he was a drag queen years later, in 2013, when he visited New York to see Heath-Clark act in The Orion Experience. He responded with enthusiasm and support.

Heath-Clark identifies as non-binary and pansexual. He and his husband, John, wed on December 31, 2012, at the Hartley House in Hell's Kitchen. The two have a pet cat. Heath-Clark resided in New York City until late 2019, when he relocated to Los Angeles following the airing of his season of Drag Race. Prior to the COVID-19 pandemic, he continued to work in both cities, traveling regularly between them.

As of May 2020, Heath-Clark keeps a vegan diet. He stopped drinking alcohol a few months after filming Drag Race but later resumed its consumption. He has stated that he has anxiety.

Hollywood director Lee Daniels, who created the television series Empire and produced the films Monster's Ball and Precious, is Heath-Clark's cousin.

== Discography ==
=== Studio albums ===
Title	Details	Ref(s)
Electrohoney	Released: 2013 (by Electrohoney); Label: self-released; Formats: digital download	

=== EPs ===
Title	Details	Ref(s)
Raw and Unfiltered	Released: 2019; Label: Chew Fu; Formats: digital download	
Love Is God	Released: 2022; Label: self-released; Formats: digital download	

=== Singles ===
==== As lead artist ====
Title	Year	Album	Notes	Ref(s)
"Indestructible"	2013	Electrohoney	Credited to Electrohoney	
"T.R.O.U.B.L.E" (feat. Orion)	2015	Non-album single	Credited as Sir Honey Davenport	
"The Hive"	2019	Raw and Unfiltered		
"Warrior"	2019	Raw and Unfiltered		
"Raw and Unfiltered"	2019	Raw and Unfiltered		
"Made Like You"	2019	Raw and Unfiltered		
"Cocoa Butter" (feat. Jayse Vegas, Kareem McJagger, Nedra Belle & Will Sheridan)	2019	Raw and Unfiltered		
"Worship Me"	2019	Raw and Unfiltered	Co-credited with Orion Simprini	
"Stan for You" (feat. Yvie Oddly)	2019	Non-album singles		
"Present (Tie You Down)"	2019	Non-album singles		
"Draw the Blood" (feat. Electropoint)	2020	Non-album singles	Co-credited with Aja	
"Digital Rainbow" (feat. Yvie Oddly, Widow Von'Du, Cazwell & Jayse Vegas)	2020	Non-album singles		
"Freaky Planet"	2020	Non-album singles	Co-credited with Loris	
"Love Is God" (feat. Electropoint)	2021	Love Is God	Co-credited with Manila Luzon	
"Thrive" (feat. Kevin Aviance)	2022	Love Is God		
"Mighty Legendary"	2023	Non-album singles		
"Throw Money"	2024	Non-album singles		

==== As featured artist ====
Title	Year	Album	Ref(s)
"Body (Remix)" (Jayse Vegas feat. Honey Davenport)	2017	Non-album singles	
"Energy (Remix)" (Jayse Vegas feat. Will Sheridan, Honey Davenport, King Paputi, Kelvin Love, Christopher Ambrose, Goldilocks & Robert Garcia)	2020	Non-album singles	

== Filmography ==
=== Film ===
Year	Title	Role	Ref(s)
2023	God Save the Queens	Herself	

=== Television ===
Year	Title	Role	Ref(s)
2015	Watch What Happens Live with Andy Cohen	Guest (Whitney Houston impersonator)	
2019	RuPaul's Drag Race (season 11)	Contestant (13th place)	
2019	RuPaul's Drag Race: Untucked (season 11)	Herself	

=== Internet series ===
Year	Title	Role	Producer	Ref(s)
2014	The Finish Line	Co-host (with Kareem McJagger)	Self-produced	
2019	Whatcha Packin'	Guest	VH1	
2019	Bootleg Fashion Photo RuView	Guest	Yuhua Hamasaki	
2019	Cosmo Queens	Guest star	Cosmopolitan	
2019	I've Never Had a ...	Guest	Vice	
2019	Take a Look Back	Guest	AJ Mattioli	
2019	Puff Puff Sessions	Guest	World of Wonder	
2019	Bootleg Opinions	Guest	Yuhua Hamasaki	
2019	Lash Out	Host	BeeZee Productions	
2019	Black Girl Beauty	Guest panelist	VH1	
2019–present	Da Fuq	Host	BeeZee Productions	
2020	Hey Qween!	Guest	Jonny McGovern	
2020	Tub Talk	Host	Self-produced	
2020	Hey Qween PRIDE 2020	Guest	Johnny McGovern	
2021	Cosmo Queens UK	Guest star	Cosmopolitan UK	
2021	Trade with Honey and Dakota	Co-host (with Dakota Payne)	BeeZee Productions	
2021	Hot T: Celebrity Gossip & Hollywood Shade	Guest panelist	Jonny McGovern	
2021	The Browns	Guest star	OUTtv	
2022	Binge Queens	Co-host	World of Wonder	
2022	Open to It	Wigonometry	Jonathan James and Sabrina Cooper	
2022	Tongue Thai'd	Self	World of Wonder	

=== Music videos ===
==== As lead artist or director ====
Year	Title	Credited as		Notes	Ref(s)
Year	Title	Lead artist	Director	Notes	Ref(s)
2013	"Indestructible" (Electrohoney)	Yes	No	Credited as a member of Electrohoney	
2015	"T.R.O.U.B.L.E" (feat. Orion)	Yes	No	Credited as Sir Honey Davenport	
2019	"The Hive" (short)	Yes	No		
2019	"Warrior" (short)	Yes	No		
2019	"Raw and Unfiltered" (short)	Yes	No		
2019	"Made Like You" (short)	Yes	No		
2019	"Cocoa Butter"	Yes	No		
2019	"Stan for You" (feat. Yvie Oddly)	Yes	No		
2019	"Worship Me"	Yes	No	Co-credited with Orion Simprini	
2019	"Present (Tie You Down)" (short)	Yes	No		
2020	"Raw and Unfiltered" (NSFW)	Yes	No	Released only on DragFor.Fans	
2020	"Raw and Unfiltered" (censored)	Yes	No		
2020	"Draw the Blood" (feat. Electropoint)	Yes	Yes	Co-credited as lead artist with Aja	
2020	"Digital Rainbow" (feat. Yvie Oddly, Widow Von'Du, Jayse Vegas & Cazwell)	Yes	No		
2020	"Made Like You (Quarantine Edition)"	Yes	Yes		
2020	"Sweet Love" (Shuga Cain)	No	Yes	Credited as assistant director; artist credit to Shuga Cain	
2020	"Warrior (Quarantine Edition)"	Yes	No	New full-length video accompanied by re-release of song	
2020	"Freaky Planet"	Yes	No	Co-credited as lead artist with Loris	
2020	"Present (Quarantine Edition)"	Yes	No	New full-length video	
2021	"Red Neon Light" (Vegas Valentine)	No	Yes	Credited as co-director; artist credit to Vegas Valentine	
2021	"An Other Realm" (Maxi Glamour feat. Tense Era)	No	Yes	Credited as director; artist credit to Maxi Glamour	
2021	"Love Is God" (feat. Electropoint)	Yes	No	Co-credited as lead artist with Manila Luzon	
2022	"Thrive" (feat. Kevin Aviance)	Yes	Yes		
2023	"Mighty Legendary (Legends Only Remix)" (feat. Alaska Thunderfuck)	Yes	No		

==== Featured and cameo roles ====
Year	Title	Artist	Role	Ref(s)
2017	"Body (Remix)"	Jayse Vegas feat. Honey Davenport	Feature	
2018	"Give You Life"	Jayse Vegas feat. Kareem McJagger & Kimmi Moore	Cameo	
2019	"Pretty Hot and Tasty"	Eureka O'Hara	Cameo	
2019	"No Day Like Today"	Lovari & Adam Barta	Cameo	
2020	"Hot Sauce and High Heels (Kinky Boots Remix)"	Monique Heart	Cameo	
2020	"Bitch Got Hips"	Socia(Lites)	Cameo	
2020	"Nerves of Steel"	Erasure	Cameo	
2020	"Shooting Star – A Revealing New Musical's COVID-19 Relief Fundraising Medley"	The cast of Shooting Star – A Revealing New Musical	Cameo	
2022	"Werq!"	Eureka O'Hara	Cameo	
2022	"S.A.D."	Dakota Payne	Cameo	

== Theatre ==
Year	Production	Role	Venue	Notes	Ref(s)
2013	The Electric Highway	Herself	XL Nightclub	Credited as Sir Honey Davenport	
2013	The Orion Experience	The Queen of White Lies	XL Nightclub	Credited as Sir Honey Davenport	
2017–2018	Trinkets	Diva	Gene Frankel Theatre		
2019	Raw and Unfiltered	Herself	Laurie Beechman Theatre		
2019	Stocking Stuffer: A Christmas Show with Balls	Herself	Laurie Beechman Theatre		
2019	Stocking Stuffer: A Christmas Show with Balls	Herself	Club Cumming	Closing night	

== See also ==
- Drag culture in New York City
- LGBTQ culture in New York City
- List of LGBTQ people from New York City
