= Drag Trap =

Studio album by Yvie Oddly
- Released: October 23, 2020
- Length: 35:16
- Label: Voss Music

Drag Trap is the debut studio album by American drag performer Yvie Oddly, released through Voss Music on October 23, 2020. Fellow RuPaul's Drag Race contestant Vanessa Vanjie Mateo is featured on "Hype".

== Background ==
Yvie Oddly started working on the album following her appearance on the eleventh season of RuPaul's Drag Race. She has said, "My inspiration for Drag Trap comes from all sorts of places. When Season 11 aired and my life changed drastically I began writing raps to help me navigate my emotions. So the songs range from the pressures of fame, to my health, sex, and being a queer Black American ... and just everything I needed to get off my chest."

== Promotion ==
The title track was released as a single alongside a music video in August 2020. The music video for "Hype" features Vanessa Vanjie Mateo and camero appearances by Brooke Lynn Hytes, Silky Nutmeg Ganache, and Soju. Yvie Oddly produced the music video for "Sick Bitch" with Willow Pill.

== Reception ==
Cleo Mirza included Yvie Oddly in Westword's 2021 list of "Ten of the Best Denver Rappers". Mirza said about the album and artist, "It's funny, poignant, thoughtful and powerful, and she delivers some of the most dance-worthy beats of 2020. On Drag Trap, Oddly tackles real issues — like living with Ehlers-Danlos syndrome — with humor and wit, but also proves she can get serious, as in the second half of the song "Karen," where she solemnly pays tribute to victims of police brutality. As one of the many artists striving to break boundaries between queerness and hip-hop, this hometown hero does Denver's LGBTQ+ community proud."

== Track listing ==
Drag Trap track listing
No.	Title	Length
1.	"Drag Trap" (featuring Neurotika Killz)	4:36
2.	"Chicken Dinner"	2:57
3.	"Hype" (featuring Vanessa Vanjie Mateo)	3:22
4.	"Watermelon Bubblegum"	2:44
5.	"Grind Me"	2:57
6.	"Sick Bitch" (featuring Willow Pill)	4:03
7.	"Gigging"	2:35
8.	"Take a Nap"	3:32
9.	"Karen"	4:38
10.	"Garbage Juice"	3:52
Total length:		35:16
