= The Orion Experience =

American pop rock band

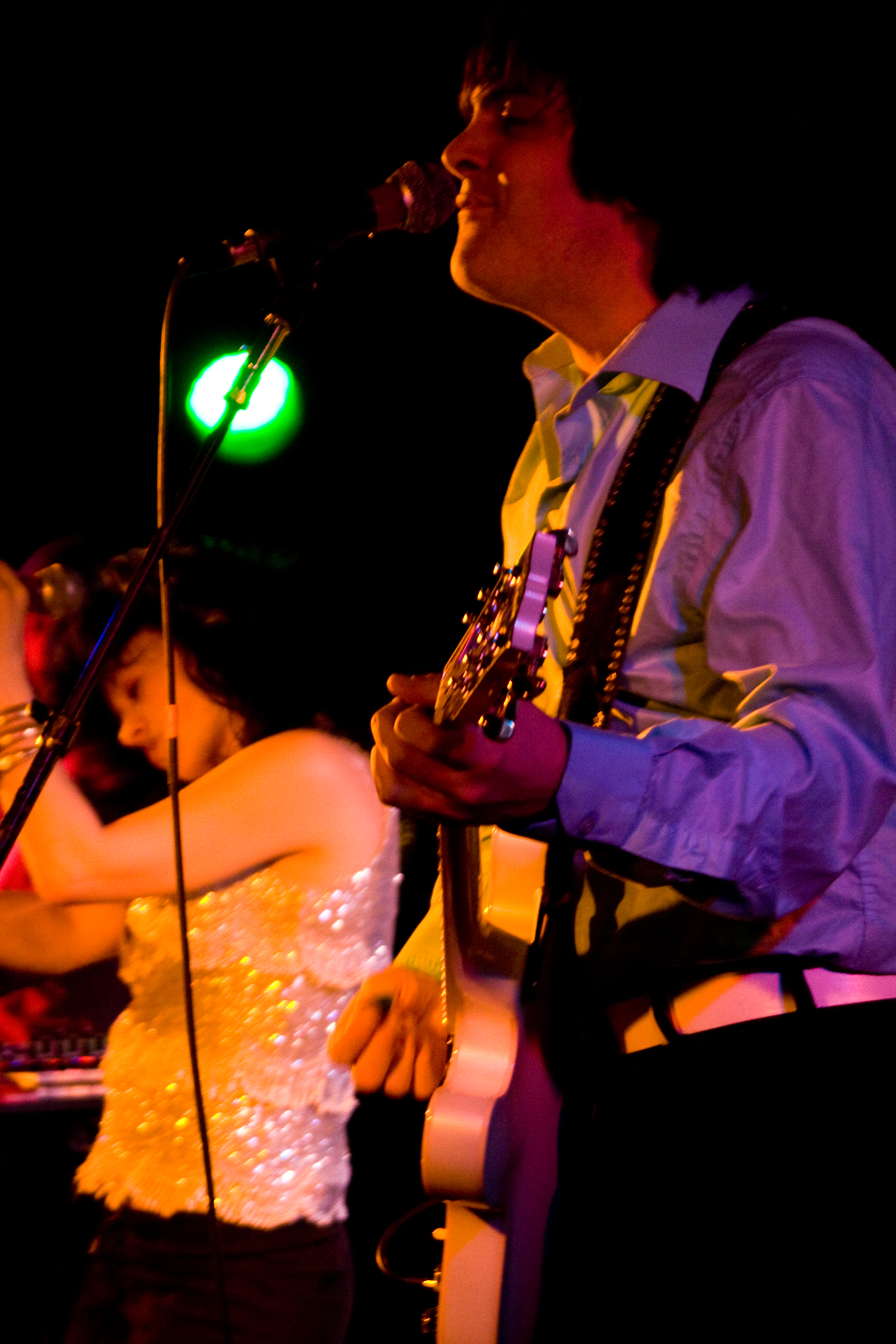
- Orion Simprini and Linda Horwatt in March 2008

Background information
- Origin: New York City
- Genres: Pop rock; indie rock; indie pop
- Years active: 2005–2014; 2021–present
- Labels: Sweet!; Needlejuice
- Spinoff of: Kitty in the Tree
- Members: Orion Simprini; Linda Horwatt; Elle Starlight; Zak Galactica; Reef Rox
- Past members: Chris Lucas; Jon Weber; Erik Paparazzi; Kareem Lamar; Marcus Farrar; Jimmy Riot
- Website: theorionexperience.com

The Orion Experience (occasionally abbreviated to T.O.E.) is an American pop rock band formed in New York City in 2005 by singer/songwriter Orion Simprini and Linda Horwatt (Linda XO). The band has released three studio albums and two EPs. The name "The Orion Experience" is a "self-effacing" reference to other bands like The Alan Parsons Project and the Steve Perry Project. The band’s gender-fluid themes and presentation have attracted a strong LGBTQ+ fanbase.

== History ==
In 2006, The Orion Experience released their first studio album, Cosmicandy, on Sweet! Records. In 2007, the band performed at Fearless Music, and in early 2008, Perez Hilton called the song "Obsessed With You" "an indie pop gem ... double yum." The same song was also featured in the 2019 thriller The Honeymoon Phase.

Their 2008 EP release, Heartbreaker, was produced by Maroon 5 producer Jon Kaplan. In 2009, the band released Cosmicandy in Japan and included all four songs from Heartbreaker, as well as a new track called "Nippon Ga Dai Suki (Japan We Love You!)".

Their second EP, NYC Girl, was released on April 19, 2011. USA Today described the title track as a "string-infused disco-pop ditty" reminiscent of "70s-era Electric Light Orchestra".

In October 2012, the band put on an immersive theater show at Dixon Place in Manhattan's Lower East Side with the "idea to make a rock concert that brought fantasy back to live music." The following year, the band created an off-Broadway show called The Orion Experience, which opened in August 2013 at XL Nightclub. The show was directed by Travis Greisler, produced by Ryan Bogner, and choreographed by Misha Shields. The cast featured Simprini, Horwatt, Reef Rox, and Honey Davenport as the Queen of White Lies. The show was accompanied by their second full-length album, Children of the Stars, which includes expanded versions of the songs from the live theater productions.

In 2014, the band recorded the single "Rich Man's Holiday". In the following years, both lead singers Simprini and Horwatt wrote and produced solo albums. Horwatt recorded the album Stupid Love and the self-titled EP Linda XO. Simprini produced his EP Lush Life and other singles.

Due to a rise in online popularity in 2019 and 2020, the band reestablished itself and began releasing more music. In January 2021, the band released Sugar Deluxe, a compilation album that combined the Heartbreaker EP and the NYC Girl EP, and included two previously unreleased tracks, "How the Story Ends" and "Lower East Side Love Song", while removing the track "Nice Guys Finish Last". The band's third studio album, Fever Dream, was released on October 22, 2021.

In 2022, Cosmicandy and Children of the Stars were reissued on vinyl, CD, and cassette by Needlejuice Records, but these were later hidden from their website on September 1, 2022 and removed completely in December 2022 after the label terminated their work for the band "in light of numerous allegations". All unsold copies of the physical releases were subsequently destroyed.

== Discography ==
=== Studio albums ===
Title	Album details
Cosmicandy	Released: 2006; Label: Sweet!, Needlejuice
Children of the Stars	Released: 2013; Label: Sweet!, Needlejuice
Fever Dream	Released: 2021; Label: Sweet!
Cosmicovers	Released: 2023; Label: Sweet!
Magical Animals	Released: 2025; Label: Sweet!

=== Extended plays ===
Title	EP details
Heartbreaker	Released: 2008; Label: Sweet!
NYC Girl	Released: 2011; Label: Sweet!

=== Compilation albums ===
Title	Album details
Sugar Deluxe	Released: 2021; Label: Sweet!

=== Singles ===
Title	Year	Album
"Nippon Ga Dai Suki"	2011	Non-LP tracks
"Never Gonna Let You Go"	2013	Non-LP tracks
"Rich Man's Holiday"	2014	Non-LP tracks
"Lower East Side Love Song"	2021	Sugar Deluxe
"Jenny"	2021	Cosmicovers
"Ride a White Swan"	2021	Cosmicovers
"Lemon Boy"	2021	Cosmicovers
"All Dolled Up"	2021	Fever Dream
"Digital Affection"	2021	Fever Dream
"Night Eyes"	2021	Fever Dream
"Cosmicandy Girl"	2021	Fever Dream
"Wrecking Ball"	2022	Cosmicovers
"Moving"	2022	Cosmicovers
"The Cult of Dionysus (Nightcore / Daycore Remix)"	2023	Non-LP tracks
"All Dolled Up (Nightcore / Daycore Remix)"	2023	Non-LP tracks
"Hopelessly Devoted To You"	2023	Cosmicovers
"Oxygen"	2023	Cosmicovers
"Different Drum"	2023	Cosmicovers
