= Yvie Oddly =

American drag performer and recording artist

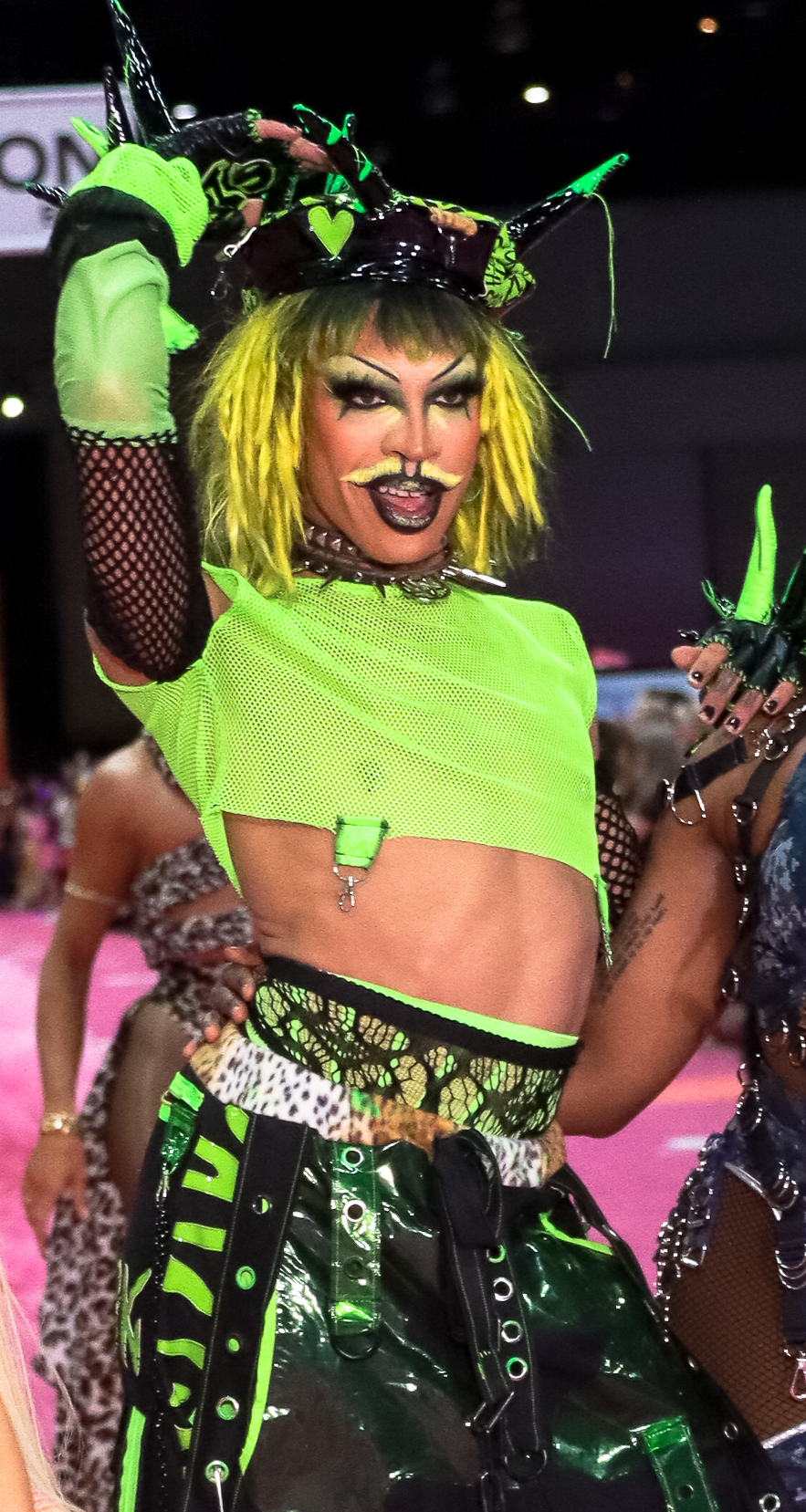
- Yvie Oddly at RuPaul's DragCon LA, 2023
- Born: Jovan Jordan Bridges; August 22, 1993 (age 33); Denver, Colorado, U.S.
- Occupations: Drag queen; fashion designer; rapper; recording artist
- Years active: 2012–present
- Television: RuPaul's Drag Race (season 11); RuPaul's Drag Race All Stars (season 7)
- Spouse: Doug Illsley (m. 2023)
- Website: www.OddlyYvie.com

Jovan Jordan Bridges (born August 22, 1993), known by the stage name Yvie Oddly, is an American drag queen, performer, fashion designer, rapper, and recording artist from Denver, Colorado, who came to international attention in 2019 when she won the eleventh season of RuPaul's Drag Race. She later returned to compete on the seventh season of RuPaul's Drag Race All Stars, an all-winners season, in 2022. Yvie Oddly has been on the worldwide Werq the World drag concert tour since 2019. In addition to music videos and performances, she explores what she sees as a transformative power of drag by making thrift store finds into wearable art in Yvie Oddly's Oddities series on WOW Presents Plus. She released her debut album, Drag Trap, in 2020.

On June 19, 2024, Yvie Oddly released their biography, All About Yvie: Into The Oddity, which became a USA Today Best Seller. The book is co-written by Michael Bach.

== Early life and education ==
Jovan Bridges was born on August 22, 1993, in Denver, Colorado. As a child, she played with her mother's makeup and dressed in her sister's clothes, "When I was a six-year-old boy playing dress-up in my sister's tutus and makeup, my parents were like, 'Take that off.' And I was like, 'Why?' I felt pretty and I'd sleep in a skirt every night." She participated in gymnastics and other strenuous extracurricular activities until she was diagnosed with Ehlers–Danlos syndrome at age fifteen. She began musical theatre as an alternative.

Bridges describes her first exposure to drag as taking place in middle school, when a classmate dressed up as a hooker for Halloween and attracted significant attention. The following Halloween, Bridges dressed as a hooker and enjoyed both her peers' shock and admiration. Bridges attended East High School, and went to college at the Auraria Campus, both in Denver.

== Career ==
=== Early career ===
Yvie Oddly started her career as Avon Eve, performing for her first time at the Center in Denver, CO. before moving on to performing at Broadways Bar in a show hosted by Mile High Pinky Pie.

Yvie Oddly started doing drag during college in 2012 when Venus D'lite from RuPaul's Drag Race hosted a workshop on the college campus for Valentine's Day, stating that she "attempted some drag (or ghost) makeup, put on a super-cheap red wig and dress, and backflipped my way through "Scheiße" by Lady Gaga". Her first performances were at Denver's gay bar Tracks. The name 'Yvie Oddly' came from her pun to express "being even odder than anybody else".

Yvie Oddly was the winner of the Ultimate Queen of Denver pageant in 2015. Later that summer, Yvie Oddly became a cast member of Drag Nation; opened for pop star Mya on the Main Stage for PrideFest; and performed in Bohemia's The Prohibition of Lust. She was also in the music video for Adore Delano's "Negative Nancy" in 2017.

In 2018, Yvie Oddly was both the manager at her Denver home drag bar as well as a drag queen, and was looking to transform her drag into a full-time job. She felt the time to make a drastic life change was imminent even if her audition tape did not get her onto RuPaul's Drag Race.

=== RuPaul's Drag Race ===
Bridges was announced as a contestant on the eleventh season of RuPaul's Drag Race in January 2019 after applying to compete three times. They were the second performer from Denver to compete on the series, following fellow contestant Nina Flowers. Bridges later said the competition was an isolating experience because contestants were unable to communicate with friends or family during filming.

Throughout the 2019 competition, Bridges became known for unconventional runway presentations, physically demanding lip sync performances, and an outspoken personality. Bridges said they entered the competition hoping to challenge what they saw as increasingly formulaic expectations of drag and to emphasize the art form's queer origins.

During the season, Bridges won the second main challenge alongside fellow contestant Scarlet Envy. They spent six consecutive weeks placing among the top performers in the competition. One of the defining moments of the season came during the Snatch Game episode, when Bridges and fellow contestant Brooke Lynn Hytes both landed in the bottom two before lip-syncing to Demi Lovato's "Sorry Not Sorry". The performance received widespread critical acclaim, and RuPaul departed from the competition's usual format by allowing both contestants to remain in the competition.

During the televised competition, Bridges also spoke publicly about living with hypermobile Ehlers–Danlos syndrome, explaining that the condition affected joint stability and chronic pain while performing.

Bridges advanced to the live finale, held at the Orpheum Theatre in Los Angeles, where they defeated A'keria C. Davenport in a lip sync to Rihanna's "SOS" before facing Brooke Lynn Hytes in the final performance to Lady Gaga's "The Edge of Glory". On May 30, 2019, Bridges was crowned the winner of the eleventh season of RuPaul's Drag Race and named "America's Next Drag Superstar".

Bridges returned to the franchise as a guest "Lip Sync Assassin" on the fifth season of RuPaul's Drag Race All Stars in 2020. In 2022, they competed on the seventh season of RuPaul's Drag Race All Stars, the franchise's first all-winners competition.

=== Music ===
Following her victory on RuPaul's Drag Race in 2019, Bridges began releasing original music alongside her live performances. Her earliest releases included the singles "Weirdo", recorded with rapper Cazwell and Craig C., and "Dolla Store", both released in 2019. Bridges also appeared as a featured artist on recordings including drag performer Honey Davenport's "Stan for You" and the cast recording of RuPaul's "Queens Everywhere".

In 2020, Bridges released the debut studio album Drag Trap through Voss Events. The album included the singles "Giggling", "Hype", featuring drag performer Vanessa Vanjie Mateo, and the title track "Drag Trap", featuring rapper Neurotika Killz.. During the COVID-19 pandemic, when live touring largely paused, Bridges said the break allowed more time to develop creative concepts for music and video projects at home.

Bridges has also appeared in and directed music videos. Before competing on RuPaul's Drag Race, Bridges appeared in videos by drag performers Sharon Needles and Adore Delano. Bridges later directed the videos for "Drag Trap" and "Watermelon Bubblegum". After the release of Drag Trap, Bridges continued recording collaborative singles and guest appearances, including "Attention" with singer Miss Madeline, the "Winner Winner (Chicken Dinner Remix)" with drag performers BeBe Zahara Benet and Shea Couleé, and "Energy" with musician Josh Lumsden. Bridges also appeared on the RuPaul's Drag Race franchise recordings "Queens Everywhere" (2019) and "Legends" (2022).

=== Touring and live performances ===
In 2019, Bridges joined the North American leg of the Werq the World tour, an international drag concert tour hosted by Michelle Visage and featuring performers from the RuPaul's Drag Race franchise. The North American tour visited seventeen cities, including five in Canada, before continuing later that year to Asia, Australia, and New Zealand.

In June 2019, Bridges performed at Denver PrideFest, the city's annual LGBTQ pride festival, and hosted Drag Nation at Tracks, their home venue. Later that month, they made their first performance in the United Kingdom at DYMK in Bournemouth. During Stonewall 50 – WorldPride NYC 2019, Bridges performed at the Opening Ceremony benefiting the Ali Forney Center, Immigration Equality, and Services & Advocacy for GLBT Elders (SAGE), before also appearing at the LadyLand Festival.

In September 2019, Bridges joined the rotating cast of RuPaul's Drag Race Live!, a residency at the Flamingo Las Vegas.

Bridges said hypermobile Ehlers–Danlos syndrome (hEDS) required them to adapt their performances as their career expanded. They also limited post-show photo opportunities to conserve energy while continuing to interact with fans in more meaningful ways.

During the COVID-19 pandemic in 2020, the suspension of live performances temporarily brought Bridges' touring schedule to a halt. They later said the break returned them to creating art at home, as they had before appearing on television.

=== Other endeavours ===
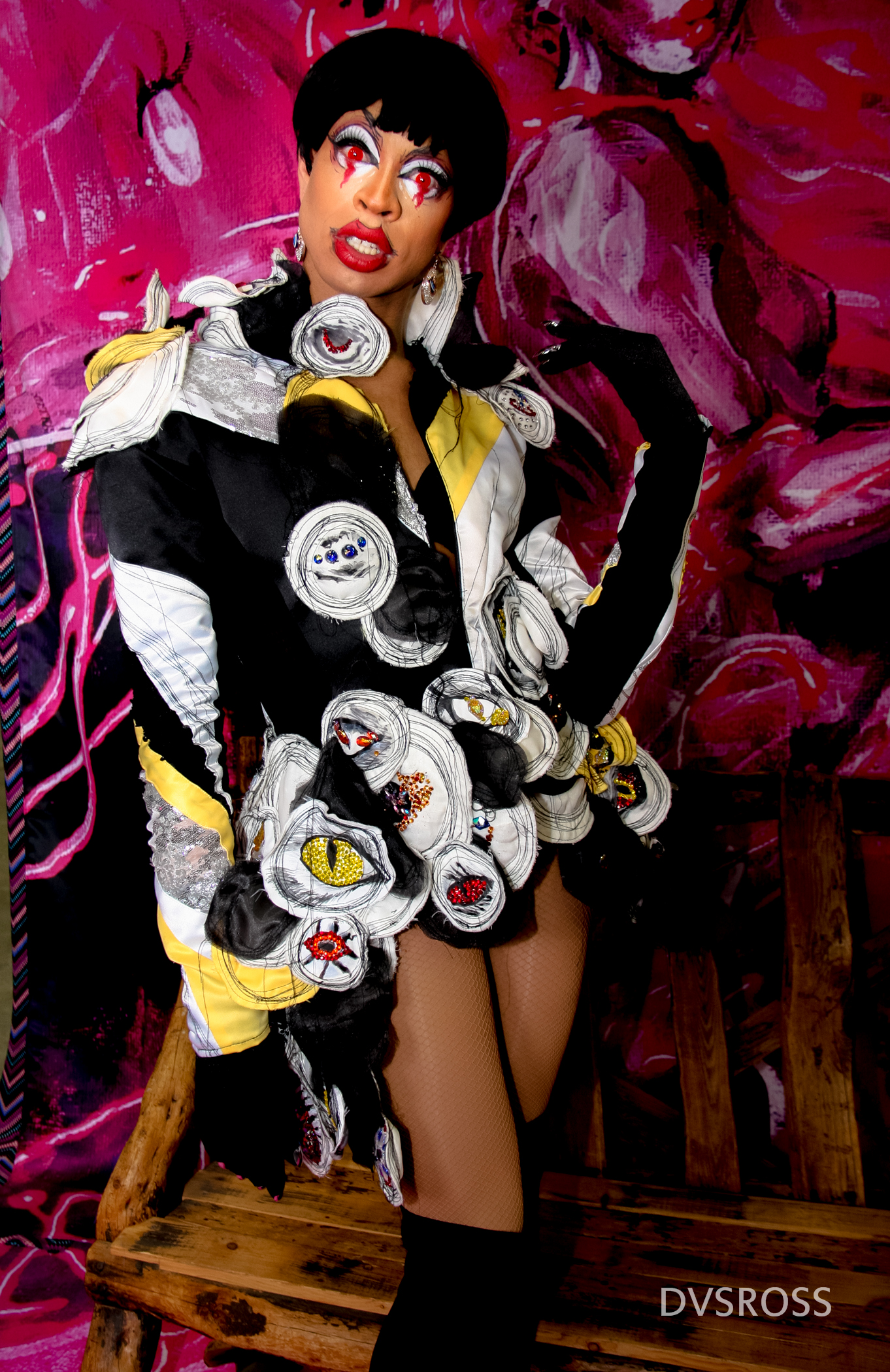
Yvie Oddly at RuPaul's DragCon LA in 2019

By her first DragCon the only thing that had changed were the connections. She said, "so I spent the next nine months paying back the debt of being THE FIRST winner of my kind since the show's mainstream crossover."

In June 2019 World of Wonder, the production company behind RuPaul's Drag Race, announced Yvie Oddly will star in her own reality show series, Yvie Oddly's Oddities aired worldwide on WOW Presents Plus. It follows the bargain-hunting queen to thrift stores where she shops for "throwaway items to turn one queen's trash into her jaw-dropping fashion treasures". Yvie Oddly explained that, "Drag is all about the power of transformation." However, as of 2023, the series is yet to air.

Appearing on Drag Race, let alone winning, put Yvie Oddly on a steep learning curve to transform every aspect of her drag art into a business. It also forced her to re-evaluate what she could physically do—as contorting her body in performances takes a toll—while still delivering a drag experience for her audiences. Yvie Oddly stated,

"It's about taking a step back and having a conversation with whatever you're doing. A lot of people are just go, go, go. But you need to see what things are working, what things aren't working, and how to manipulate them in your favor, and think about the people that you're actually making it for."

== Artistry ==
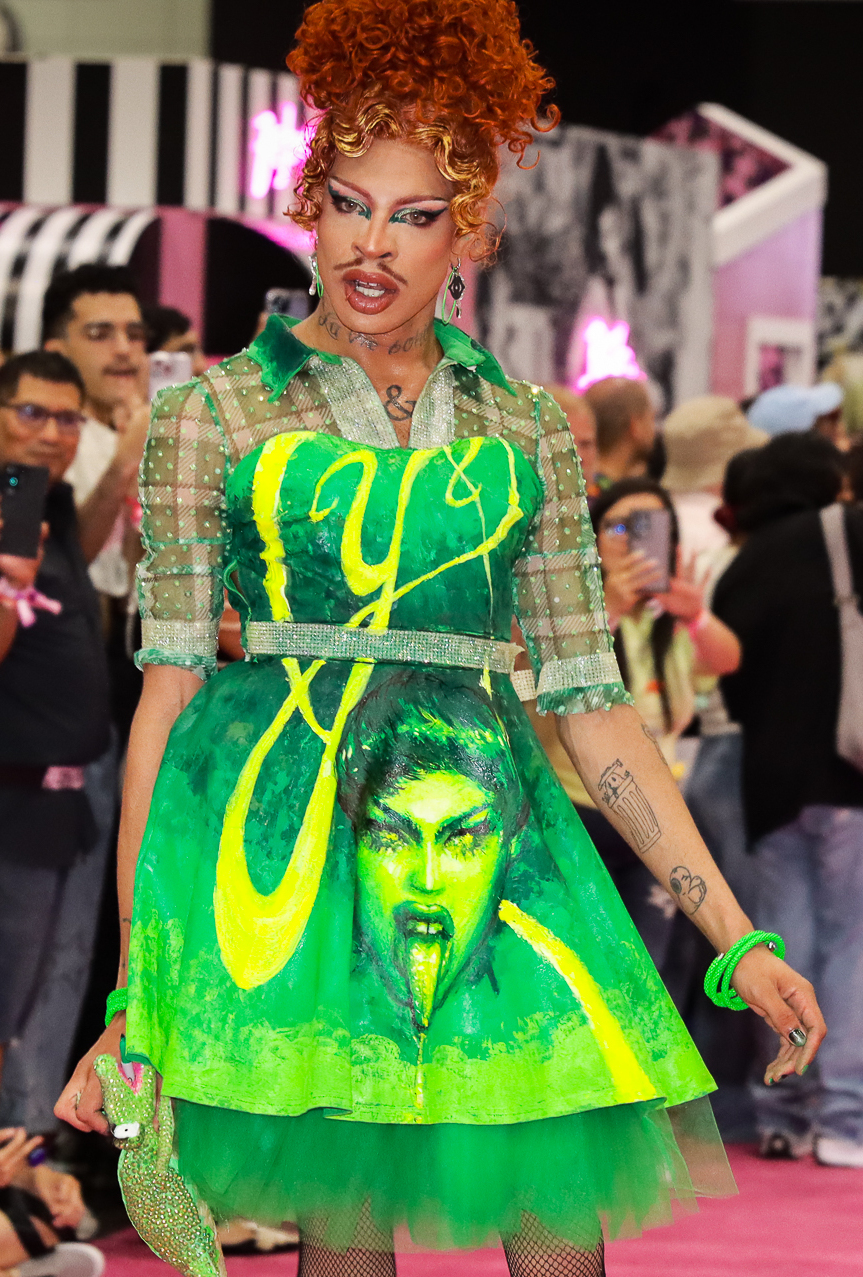
Yvie Oddly at RuPaul's DragCon LA, 2024

Bridges has described drag as a form of artistic expression that combines fashion, performance, and conceptual elements. Developed while performing in Denver's drag scene, the Yvie Oddly character reflects a desire to be "even odder than anybody else", with an emphasis on originality over conventional glamour. Bridges has described drag as both an artistic practice and a way of challenging gender roles and expectations, and has said the goal is to create performances and visual designs that audiences have not seen before. Over time, Yvie Oddly developed a reputation for "outrageous and unconventional looks on stage".

According to Bridges, Yvie Oddly's distinctive aesthetic developed in part because "the most glamorous or the most expensive" looks were not an option early in a drag career. Instead, Bridges created costumes from inexpensive, unconventional, and found materials. Bridges has described the Yvie Oddly character as blending "artistry, fashion, performance and concept", and has cited French fashion designer Thierry Mugler, British fashion designer Alexander McQueen, and drag performer Christeene among its influences. Bridges has also credited RuPaul's Drag Race winner Sharon Needles with demonstrating that drag could prioritize art and wit over conventional glamour.

In interviews before and after appearing on RuPaul's Drag Race, Bridges said the Yvie Oddly character was developed in response to what was perceived as an increasingly formulaic approach to drag. Rather than emphasizing expensive costumes or polished pageantry, Bridges said the goal was to challenge expectations while reflecting drag's queer origins through originality and experimentation.

Bridges' artistic approach has attracted both praise and criticism. After winning RuPaul's Drag Race in 2019, some fans criticized the continued use of costumes made from inexpensive or found materials, questioning why the competition's winner was not presenting more elaborate looks. Bridges responded by embracing the criticism, reclaiming the description of "garbage drag" and arguing that fashion and drag should reflect an artist's lived experience as much as technical polish or expense.

== Personal life ==
Yvie Oddly has been diagnosed with type 3 Hypermobile Ehlers–Danlos syndrome (hEDS). With her heightened status, she has found a content community of people living with hEDS, and other invisible disabilities, who call themselves "zebras", as they have more exotic diseases than doctors would expect. The condition as well as the chronic pain of her "bones grinding" leave her depleted after performing so she foregoes post-show photo ops for more meaningful interactions.

Yvie Oddly is the grandchild of Denver Black Panther's leader Lauren Watson. Yvie Oddly married Doug Illsley in July 2023.

As a drag queen, she is the drag sister of Willow Pill, who won the fourteenth season of RuPaul's Drag Race.

Yvie Oddly is genderqueer, and uses she/he/they pronouns

== Filmography ==
=== Television ===
Year	Title	Role	Notes	Ref
2019	RuPaul's Drag Race season 11	Herself	Winner	
2019	RuPaul's Drag Race: Untucked	Herself	Winner	
2019	The Morning Show	Herself	Guest	
2020	RuPaul's Drag Race season 12	Herself	Guest (episode 14)	
2020	RuPaul's Drag Race All Stars season 5	Herself	"Lip Sync Assassin" (episode 1)	
2020	RuPaul's Drag Race All Stars: Untucked season 2	Herself	"Lip Sync Assassin" (episode 1)	
2020	RuPaul's Drag Race: Vegas Revue	Herself		
2022	The Kelly Clarkson Show	Herself	Guest	
2022	RuPaul's Drag Race All Stars season 7	Herself	Contestant	
2022	RuPaul's Drag Race All Stars: Untucked season 4	Herself	Contestant	
2022	Countdown to All Stars 7: You're a Winner Baby	Herself	VH1 special	
2022	The View	Herself	Guest	
2026	The Boulet Brothers' Dragula	Herself	Guest judge; season 7, episode 2	

=== Web series ===
Year	Title	Role	Ref.
2019	Whatcha Packin'	Herself	
2019	Queen to Queen	Herself	
2019	Yvie's Odd School	Herself	
2020	Werq the World	Herself	
2022	BuzzFeed Celeb	Herself	
2022	Friendship Test	Herself	
2022	Drip Or Drop?	Herself	
2022	Portrait of a Queen	Herself	
2024	Very Delta	Herself	

== Discography ==
=== Studio albums ===
Title	Album details
Drag Trap	Released: October 23, 2020; Label: Voss; Format: Digital download, streaming

=== Singles ===
==== As lead artist ====
Title	Year	Album
"Weirdo" (with Cazwell)	2019	Non-album singles
"Dolla Store"	2019	Non-album singles
"Giggling"	2020	Drag Trap
"Hype" (featuring Vanessa Vanjie Mateo)	2020	Drag Trap
"Drag Trap" (featuring Neurotika Killz)	2020	Drag Trap
"Attention" (with Miss Madeline)	2020	Non-album singles
"Winner Winner" (Chicken Dinner Remix) (featuring Bebe Zahara Benet & Shea Coulee)	2021	Non-album singles

==== As featured artist ====
Title	Year	Album
"Queens Everywhere" (Cast version) (RuPaul featuring the Cast of RuPaul's Drag Race, season 11)	2019	Non-album singles
"Stan for You" Honey Davenport featuring Yvie Oddly	2019	Non-album singles
"Digital Rainbow" Honey Davenport featuring Yvie Oddly, Widow Von Du, Cazwell, and Jayse Vegas	2020	Non-album singles
"911" Baby Sp!t featuring Yvie Oddly, Shanita Bump, Neurotika Killz, and Ricky Whatever	2020	Heavy Metal Princess
"Energy" (Josh Lumsden featuring Yvie Oddly)	2021	Non-album singles
"Legends" (Cast Version) (RuPaul featuring the cast of RuPaul's Drag Race All Stars, season 7)	2022	Non-album singles

=== Music videos ===
==== As lead artists ====
Title	Year	Director(s)
"Weirdo" (with Cazwell and Craig C.)	2019	Bottle
"Dolla Store"	2019	Assaad Yacoub
"Giggling"	2020	Jeanne Jo
"Hype" (featuring Vanessa Vanjie Mateo)	2020	Jasper Rischen
"Drag Trap" (featuring Neurotika Killz)	2020	Yvie Oddly
"Watermelon Bubblegum"	2020	Yvie Oddly
"Sick Bitch" (featuring Willow Pill)	2021	Yvie Oddly and Willow Pill
"Grind Me"	2021	Brad Hammer and Shawn Adeli

==== Guest appearances ====
Title	Year	Artist
"Dressed to Kill"	2014	Sharon Needles
"Negative Nancy"	2017	Adore Delano
"Stan for U" (featuring Yvie Oddly)	2019	Honey Davenport
"Always"	2020	Waze & Odyssey
"Digital Rainbow"	2020	Honey Davenport

== Notes ==
Awards and achievements
Preceded by Aquaria	Winner of RuPaul's Drag Race; US season 11	Succeeded by Jaida Essence Hall
