= Will Sheridan =

American singer

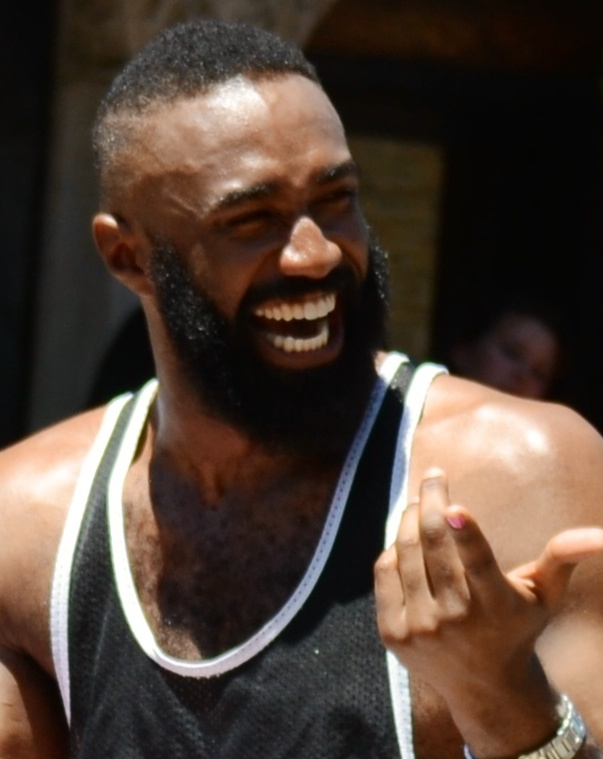

Personal information
- Born: January 12, 1985 (age 41) Bear, Delaware, U.S.
- Listed height: 6 ft 8 in (2.03 m)

Career information
- High school: Sanford School (Hockessin, Delaware)
- College: Villanova (2003–2007)
- Position: Forward
- Number: 50

Will Sheridan Jr. (born January 12, 1985) is an American former college basketball player who played for the Villanova Wildcats Men's Basketball program from 2003 to 2007. After graduation, he played as an international basketball player in Italy. He is now a rapper, musician and recording artist initially signed with Royal Advisor Records and an EP released entitled Ngoma. Since then, he has released six other projects including G.I.A.N.T, his first full-length LP, G2R, LexIcon, all available on all online music outlets. Sheridan also released critically acclaimed and pioneering LGBT Hip Hop EP, S.O.A.P (Sex on a Platter) and follow up Giant album G2, which he opted to give away for free. Sheridan is also a DJ, event curator and professional MC and Host. In addition to being an LGBT Sports and Music pioneer, he is a professional event coordinator with a New York City-based production company.

== Basketball career ==
Will Sheridan is the son of Will Sr. and Josie (née Costango), both police officers. His siblings are DeVaughn and Chaleoa. His nickname was Bump. He started playing basketball in Sanford High School and ranked very high nationally as among the top 50 prep players in by Basketball Times.

He was recruited to Villanova University where he majored in Communications. Division I basketball team Villanova Wildcats in the 2003–2004 season and started for all 4 seasons there until graduation at the end of the 2006–2007 season. He is 6′8″ and played as forward. He also penned a journal for the Philadelphia Daily News during Villanova's 2006 NCAA tournament run.

After returning from Italy, where he played briefly in the Italian Basketball League, he returned to New York where he went into music.

== Musical career ==
Will Sheridan
- Born: Will Sheridan Jr. January 12, 1985 (age 41)
- Origin: Bear, Delaware, U.S.
- Occupations: Singer, songwriter
- Instrument: Vocals
- Years active: 2010 – present
- Label: Royal Advisor Records

His start was a gig entitled "The Will to Win" at the Spark Center, a tiny café attached to an Italian restaurant in New York. He was also inspired by a visit to Nairobi and the Ruiru Rehabilitation Center. His music is a mix of house, hip hop and African rhythms. He released his first EP Ngoma (meaning music in Swahili language). His first music video from the EP was "Welcome to the Jungle", that has a decidedly African rhythm with the refrain of the word "asante", which means thank you in Swahili. His follow-up single is "302", being the area code for Bear, Delaware where he grew up.

Since his debut RapIreland.com posted on their website "It seems that we could have our very first openly gay Hip Hop artist," shortly after Will Sheridan's public appearance on OUTSIDE THE LINES. Following his "Ngoma" release, Will Sheridan went on to perform throughout New York City. He started his legacy of live performance by hosting two monthly showcases, one at Rockbar on the WestSide called Westside Wednesdays and another at Fat Baby on the Lower East Side called GIANT. His live performances are energetic. Sheridan now hosts a weekly party, Hot Fruit, every Monday night at Brooklyn's Metropolitan.

Will Sheridan has performed at various music festivals around the world. He's headlined Austin Texas' Outlander Music Festival, performed at Stargayzer Fest, Yo Sissy Music Festival (Berlin), Folsom Street Fair, Folsom East and is a Brooklyn staple at Bushwig Festival. Sheridan has also opened up for Drake, Peaches, Christeen and collaborated with artists such as Cakes da Killa, Big Dipper, Boy Radio, Corey Tut and Kyven.

Will Sheridan released his first full-length album on June 15, 2012, appropriately titled G.I.A.N.T. Will Sheridan's videos have been featured throughout the various websites, the latest support has been from notable hip hop website www.allhiphop.com. He has released a collection of videos from the LP, G.I.A.N.T. all featured on YouTube. In 2014, Sheridan released critically acclaimed EP S.O.A.P (Sex on a Platter) which has two videos available on YouTube and is a free download on SoundCloud.com. In 2016, Sheridan's second LP G2 was released and is also available for free download on SoundCloud.com. In 2017, Sheridan released G2R, a remix album on Royal Advisor Records. In 2018, LexIcon, Sheridan's latest EP with DJ Lorant was released on Royal Advisor Records. Both projects are available on all major online music outlets. Most recently Sheridan was A&R for music in Brooklyn indie horror film, Killer Unicorn.

== Personal life ==
At the beginning of his first year, Will Sheridan came out privately to his teammate and roommate at Villanova Mike Nardi as being gay. He also came out to his parents months later, after he ended his first year in the university. His teammates at Villanova knew about his homosexuality, but kept a "wall of silence" opting for team unity. On May 16, 2011, and in an interview with Dana O'Neil on ESPN.com, he came out publicly at the age of 26, after retiring from basketball. After the publication of the article, he also appeared on ESPN's Outside the Lines.

In an interview with Outsports, he said many of his songs, most notably "You Know I Got It" and "Set Fire in the Streets" did contain lyrics about homosexuality prior to coming out publicly.

Sheridan is only the second former Division I male basketball player to publicly come out of the closet as gay with British former player John Amaechi being the first to come out in February 2007. NCAA Division I Long Beach State 49er basketball center Travon Free came out openly as a bisexual player in January 2011.

== Discography ==
All releases on Royal Advisor Records

=== Albums ===
Title and details
G.I.A.N.T.
- Type: Studio album
- Released: May 15, 2012
- Record Label: Royal Advisor Records
Notes

| No. | Title | Length |
|---|---|---|
| 1. | "G.I.A.N.T. Intro" |
| 2. | "Here Comes The Son" |
| 3. | "Driving Me Wild" |
| 4. | "Set Fire to the Streets" |
| 5. | "Who I Am" |
| 6. | "Blind" |
| 7. | "Bully Bulliers" |
| 8. | "What More Could You Want" |
| 9. | "Bully Bulliers" |
| 10. | "Gone" |
| 11. | "What's Your Phunktion" |
| 12. | "Rock Wit' Me" |
| 13. | "Fu<king Wit' The Giant" |
| 14. | "Hell's Bells" |
| 15. | "Journey feat. Peter Kirk" |
| 16. | "Liquid" (feat. Carvo) |
| 17. | "And It Feels Like" |
| 18. | "G.I.A.N.T." (feat. Carvo) |

=== EPs ===
Title and details
Ngoma
- Type: EP
- Released: 2010
- Record Label: Royal Advisor Records
Notes

| No. | Title | Length |
|---|---|---|
| 1. | "Fundamental (Lorant's Royal Pass)" | 5:20 |
| 2. | "You Know I Got It (W!LL's Original Mix)" | 3:54 |
| 3. | "Welcome to the Jungle (Morsy's Original Mix)" | 3:54 |
| 4. | "Welcome to the Jungle (Morsy's Go-Bop Mix)" | 5:13 |

=== Singles/videography ===
- 2012: "Here Comes the Son" on YouTube
- 2012: "Set Fire to the Streets" on YouTube
- 2012: "BLIND"
- 2011: "Welcome to the Jungle" on YouTube
- 2011: "302" on YouTube

== See also ==
- LGBT culture in New York City
- List of LGBT people from New York City
- NYC Pride March
