= Drag Queen Story Hour =

Book readings by drag queens for children

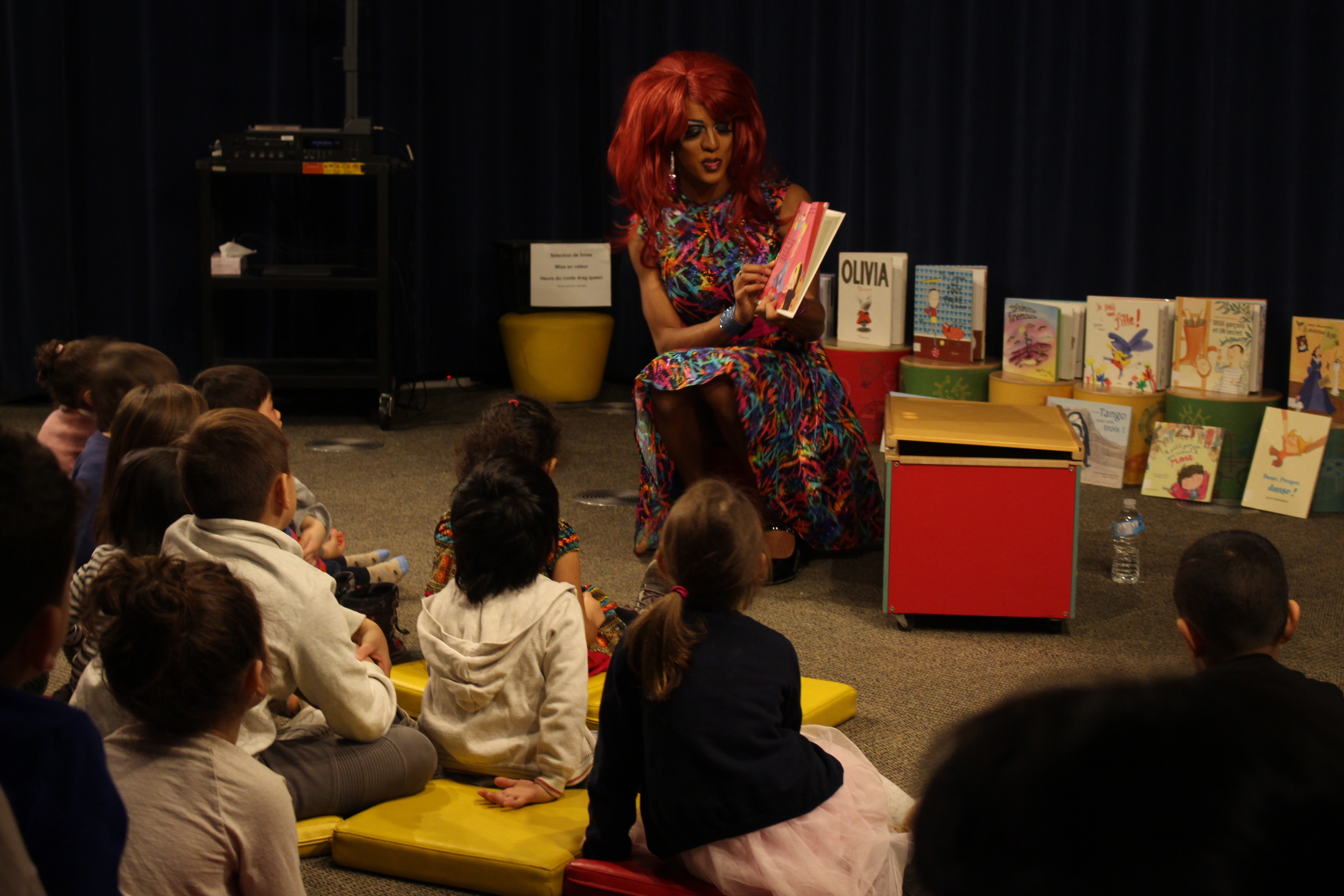
- Barbada de Barbades reading books to children at the Bibliothèque et Archives nationales du Québec in 2018.
- Genre: Children's event
- Location: Public libraries
- Inaugurated: 2015
- Founder: Michelle Tea
- Participants: Children; parents; drag queens
- Major events: Storytelling; reading; learning activities
- People: Julián Delgado Lopera; Virgie Tovar; Jonathan Hamilt; Panda Dulce
- Website: www.dragstoryhour.org

Drag Queen Story Hour (DQSH), Drag Queen Storytime, Drag Story Time, and Drag Story Hour are children's events first started in 2015 by author and activist Michelle Tea in San Francisco with the stated goals of promoting reading and diversity. The events, usually geared for children aged 3–11, are hosted by drag queens who read children’s books, and engage in other learning activities in public libraries. The events teach children about love and self-acceptance while also teaching younger children how to speak and pronounce words.

Jonathan Hamilt, who co-founded the New York chapter as a nonprofit, said that as of June 2019, DSH has 35 U.S. and five international chapters. The program strives to "capture the imagination and play of gender fluidity of childhood and gives kids glamorous, positive, and unabashedly queer role models".

Drag Story Hour events have caused public debate over the suitability of drag for child audiences. Critics say it contributes to the “sexualization” or “grooming” of children; proponents argue that these complaints amount to a "moral panic" and anti-LGBT prejudice spurred on by "right-wing misinformation". The backlash against such events has been responsible for the popularization of the term "drag panic", modelled after the older term "gay panic", becoming a political wedge issue in some communities.

== History ==
Drag Story Hour was started in 2015 in San Francisco by author Michelle Tea, who was also the executive director of nonprofit Radar Productions at the time; the first events were organized by Juliàn Delgado Lopera and Virgie Tovar. Tea, who identifies as queer, came up with the idea after attending children's library events with her newborn son and finding them welcoming but heteronormative. She imagined an event that was more inclusive and affirming to LGBTQ families. The first event was held at the Eureka Valley/Harvey Milk Memorial Branch Library in the LGBT Castro neighborhood of San Francisco and featured drag queens and was well received. Other early DSH events in San Francisco featured several drag queens of color, including Honey Mahogany, Yves St. Croissant, and Panda Dulce. As of February 2020, there are 50+ official chapters of DSH, spread internationally, as well as other drag artists holding reading events at libraries, schools, bookstores, and museums. In October 2022, the nonprofit organization officially changed its name to Drag Story Hour, to be more inclusive and "reflect the diverse cast of storytellers."

In 2017 the New York chapter incorporated as a non-profit and has received funds from the New York Public Library, Brooklyn Public Library, and two city council members. The funds buy books, some DSH events do book giveaways, go for paying the queens, and training to ensure the queens "talk effectively to children and their parents about gender identity and drag."

In 2017 and 2018, the organization had a convicted child sex offender perform in the Houston Public Library. The library had failed to do the background check that is part of its usual process for storytellers. The library apologized and recognized its shortcoming in not properly vetting the performer in question.

The books read include children's classics and works featuring LGBT characters and issues. One popular book at DSH is This Day in June, written by Gayle Pitman and illustrated by Kristyna Litten, which introduces the reader to the idea of an LGBTQ pride parade.

In March 2020, in response to the COVID-19 pandemic which had accompanying "shelter in place" and "avoid group gatherings" orders, DSHs were among events postponed. Nina West and other drag queens started live-streaming readings. West authored the children’s album Drag Is Magic, featuring RED: A Crayon Story by Michael Hall as the first book of the online series. RED is about "a crayon who suffers an identity crisis when he is labeled wrong."

== Reception ==
Drag queen story hours have been met with significant opposition by some conservatives, who object to the events themselves, as well as the drag queens performing and/or the books being read.

Writing for the National Post, Julia Malott argues that drag queens caricature femininity, that "drag queen" is not a gender identity and thus does little to help children understand the concept of gender expression, and because drag is "inherently performative" it fails at normalizing gender nonconformity anyway. She concurs that drag isn't necessarily sexual.

Proponents of drag queen story hour say events can "capture the imagination and play of gender fluidity of childhood and [give] kids glamorous, positive, and unabashedly queer role models". Nina West argues drag lets children be "creative" and "think outside the boxes us silly adults have crafted for them."

An event organizer and performer noted: "Just like an actor can do an R-rated movie and a G-rated kids’ movie, we have different levels of how we entertain and how we can put on our character as well." Some right-wing publications have also published misinformation about the events and the content of the readings, such as when Conservative Fighters falsely accused Xochi Mochi of reading from a "sexually explicit" book.

John Casey, an adjunct professor at Wagner College in New York City, posits in The Advocate,

"[Drag queens] are incredibly talented, and they are trying to live their lives, and in the process, brighten the lives of those around them. That’s the message parents should be communicating to their kids, at any age. It’s all about acceptance and being loved for who you are."

In a May 2019 First Things article and a subsequent debate with David A. French, Sohrab Ahmari argued that drag queen story hours presented a challenge to proponents of "conservative liberalism" who emphasized personal autonomy and opposed "the use of the public power to advance the common good, including in the realm of public morality". Steven Greenhut responded in a Whittier Daily News editorial that, although he perceived the story hours to be "bizarre and agenda driven", banning them would be an overreach of governmental power and an attempt to legislate morality. In August 2019, a petition by LifeSiteNews and Personhood Alliance, both anti-abortion activism groups, asked the American Library Association (ALA) to stop promoting the story hours; it gathered nearly 100,000 signatures. The ALA responded by affirming its support for DSH events, stating that it "strongly opposes any effort to limit access to information, ideas and programmes that patrons wish to explore" and "includes a commitment to combating marginalisation and underrepresentation within the communities served by libraries through increased understanding of the effects of historical exclusion."

According to progressive news website ThinkProgress, "it has been a common tactic among the far right to disrupt DSH". In June 2019, the Southern Poverty Law Center (SPLC) reported that "white nationalist and former U.S. Congressional candidate Paul Nehlen had announced on June 19 a plan he called 'PROJECT DOX TRANNY STORYTIME.'" Nehlen urged followers to gather photos and vehicle license plates of DSH participants for doxing, the Internet-based practice of researching and broadcasting private or identifying information (especially personally identifying information) about an individual. The SPLC reported that events such as DSH were "a big draw for far-right extremists". In April 2019, two members of the white nationalist group American Identity Movement (formerly Identity Evropa) dressed as clowns and disrupted a DSH in New Orleans, Louisiana.

=== Drag for children ===
Nina West, RuPaul’s Drag Race season eleven contestant and winner of Miss Congeniality, and producer of Drag Is Magic, an EP of kids music about the art form, says she hopes to inspire them to "dream big, be kind, and be their perfect selves." West feels drag is "an opportunity for children to get creative and think outside the boxes us silly adults have crafted for them." Marti Gould Cummings said something similar when a video of them performing "Baby Shark" at a drag brunch went viral. "Anyone who thinks drag isn’t for children is wrong", said Cummings. "Drag is expression, and children are such judgment-free beings; they don’t really care what you’re wearing, just what you’re performing." As of May 2019, the video has been viewed over 806,000 times.

West has responded to critics who question if children are too young to experience drag, saying, "Drag is an opportunity for anyone – including and especially children – to reconsider the masks we are all forced to wear daily." West added, "Children are inundated with implicit imagery from media about what is 'boy' and what is 'girl.' And I believe that almost all kids are really less concerned about playing with a toy that's supposedly aligned to their gender, and more concerned with playing with toys that speak to them."

The New York Times noted "Laura Edwards-Leeper, a clinical psychologist in Oregon who works with queer and trans kids, said that experimenting with gender expression isn't necessarily linked to being queer or trans." and "It's normal at basically any age for boys to dress up as princesses and girls in male superhero outfits". She argues that what changed is parenting: "When there's no judgment, kids are more likely to feel free to explore".

== By country ==
=== Australia ===
Such events (similar to those in the United States) have been proposed in Australia, but have been met with controversy.

In January 2020, an event was held in Brisbane at the Brisbane Square Library, but was met with a protest from the University of Queensland Liberal National Club (which was disendorsed by the Liberal National Party (LNP) a month earlier). A day after the protest, one of the club's members, who was openly gay, committed suicide. Another event took place in the Melbourne suburb of Werribee, but was also met with protests.

Events were not held for most of 2020 and 2021 due to the COVID-19 pandemic.

In November 2022, a drag queen appeared on the children's television program Play School reading a book about crossdressing, which drew criticism from many.

In February 2023, such an event took place at Manly Library in Sydney, but was guarded by police due to protests and even a reported bomb threat. The event was attended by a local Greens councillor and her son. An event also took place in Launceston, Tasmania, but was met with protests and criticism. Critics included the Australian Christian Lobby (ACL) and the Liberal Party, with the state's Deputy Premier Michael Ferguson criticising the event for being inappropriate.

In May 2023, the Monash City Council in Melbourne planned to hold such an event to celebrate the International Day Against Homophobia, Biphobia and Transphobia. However, this was met with several protests and counter-protests at council meetings. The first protest was attended by parents and other adults, as well as by United Australia Party Senator Ralph Babet and Rebel News Australia reporter Avi Yemini. A second protest was held, but this time saw council staff abused and the attendance of neo-Nazis. This caused the council to cancel the event, which it said was a "disappointing" decision, but they "had no choice" but to do so. The event was supposed to take place at Oakleigh Library.

In July 2024, City of Salisbury programmed a Drag Storytime event that was met with significant protests and criticism. The event went ahead, with protesters yelling homophobic abuse at the attendees.

=== Canada ===
The first drag queen story time in Canada was hosted in Kingston in June 2015 by Reelout Film Festival at the Skeleton Park Arts festival

In March 2023 Calgary City Council enacted a ban on protests around city libraries and recreation facilities as a response to protests against libraries hosting "Drag Queen Story Hour." The ban was in response to "aggressive" protests that succeeded in shutting down a Reading With Royalty event at the Seton Library.

In May 2023, a motorcycle gang, Butch Bikers, formed a human chain to protect patrons from anti-drag protestors and escorted them inside a drag storytime event at Middlesex County Library in Parkhill, Ontario.

=== Finland ===
In July 2022, police removed protesters attempting to disrupt a drag storytime event in Helsinki.

=== France ===
Following public outrage online, a library in Toulouse cancelled a drag storytime event.

=== Germany ===
In May 2023, conservative political leaders in Germany condemned plans to hold a drag storytime event at a library in Munich.

=== New Zealand ===
In March 2023, a drag storytime event was held at a library in the Auckland suburb of Avondale. However, the library was forced to close due to a protest. In mid-March 2023, the "Queens Telling Stories" event at Christchurch's Tūranga Library was picketed by 36 protesters. 160 LGBT supporters attend the Christchurch Queens reading event.

On 11 March 2024, Dunedin drag performer Ann Arkii ("Ms. Annie") hosted a "Rainbow Storytime" at the Dunedin City Library. 50 people including parents, children, Dunedin city councillor Christine Garey attended the book recital. 12 protesters gathered outside the City Library's entrance. Police spoke to one person about abusive behaviour.

On 19 March 2024, a proposed drag storytime event at Rotorua's Library organised by drag performers Sunita Torrance (Coco) and Daniel Lockett (Erika Flash) attracted opposition from Rotorua Lakes Councillor Robert Lee and Destiny Church leader Brian Tamaki, with the latter threatening to stage a protest if the event went ahead. Rotorua Lake Councillor Fisher Wang criticised opponents for promoting anti-LGBT rhetoric while Lee described the proposed event as inappropriate to children. In response to safety concerns about misinformation and violence, the Rotorua Lake Council cancelled the storytime event.

On 26 March 2024, members of the local Destiny Church in Gisborne led by Leighton Packer painted over a rainbow crossing to protest against a Drag Queen event at the local HB Williams Memorial Library. Later that day, Destiny Church members and LGBT counter-protesters gathered outside Gisborne's library where Erika and Coco Flash were hosting the Drag Queen reading. Mayor of Gisborne Rehette Stoltz condemned the vandalism of the rainbow crossing, which was subsequently repainted by the Gisborne District Council. Police later arrested five individuals who attempted to vandalise the rainbow crossing a second time. Police charged two men and a woman with graffiti vandalism in relation to the Gisborne rainbow crossing incident.

Following the Gisborne protest, an upcoming Erika and CoCo Flash Rainbow Story event in Hastings was cancelled by the Hastings District Council due to safety concerns. According to The New Zealand Herald, Hastings councillors, library staff and the council customer service were inundated with messages accusing the drag queen events of promoting child sexual grooming. In late April 2024, Rainbow Storytime NZ founder Sunita Torrance announced that a nationwide story hour tour scheduled for later in the year had been cancelled in order to focus on a defamation case against Destiny Church. By contrast, Destiny Church leader Tamaki welcomed the cancellation of Rainbow Storytime NZ's tours on social media. In late June, Torrance and Lockett filed a lawsuit against Destiny Church for allegedly inducing breach of contract, conspiracy to injure, unlawful means conspiracy, and defamation in relation to the disruption of their drag story events. In response, Destiny Church said it would continue to advocate for children's well-being and accused the New Zealand Herald of promoting crowdfunding for the drag performers' legal case.

=== United Kingdom ===
In July 2022, protesters at Reading Library in Berkshire accused a drag storytime event of "sexualising their children".

In August 2022, protestors disrupted a sold-out drag storytime event at the town hall in Bolton with signs such as "Stop drag queens reading to kids".

In December 2022, a planned drag storytime event in Dundee was cancelled due to protests.

Over a period of months, starting in January 2023, Nick Tenconi as COO of Turning Point UK was involved in organising street demonstrations in London's Honor Oak at a pub which had previously held drag queen storytime events. The repeated protests by TPUK saw hundreds of counter protesters outnumbering and drowning out TPUK's activists.

In February 2023, a drag storytime event was held at the Tate Britain art gallery in London. It was met with protesters, who were confronted by counter-protesters. One person was arrested.

In May 2023, a ticketed event held at Weston Museum was reported to be sold out.

Drag storytime events at schools are supported by the National Education Union (NEU), the largest teachers' union in the United Kingdom.

=== United States ===
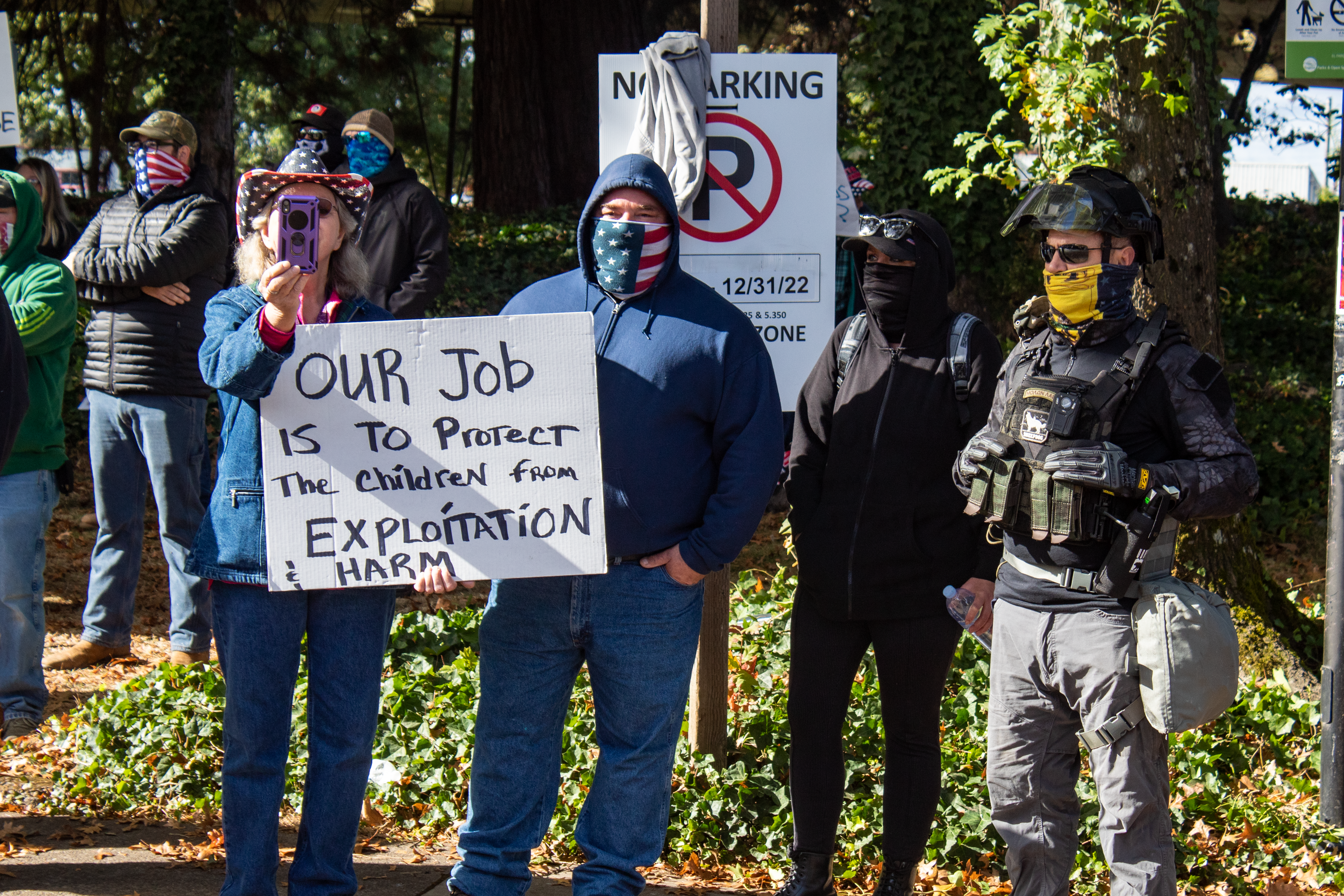
Drag Queen Story Hour protestors in Eugene, Oregon (2022)

According to The New York Times on December 20, 2022, drag story hour events "have drawn an increasing number of protests and threats across the country in recent years, including a series of tense demonstrations in New York, a city known for its inclusivity, over the last month." There is a New York City-based nonprofit organization named Drag Story Hour that has operated nationally since 2015.

A 2023 report by the Institute for Strategic Dialogue (ISD) that examined "incidents of anti-drag protests, online and offline threats, and violence" found 100 incidents targeting drag queen story hours between June 1, 2022, to May 20, 2023. During the time period studied, the ISD report found Proud Boys, White Lives Matter, Blood Tribe, Protect Texas Kids, and Guardians of Divinity groups involved in various incidents targeted at Drag Queen Story Hour events.

In New York City, incidents include reported vandalism in December 2022 by protesters at the office building and home apartment building of New York City Council member Erik Bottcher, who is a supporter of Drag Story Hour events, after he attended a DSH event two days prior at a New York City Public Library with protesters and counterprotesters outside. In 2023, New York City councilmembers Crystal Hudson and Shekar Krishnan also reported harassment and intimidation from opponents of Drag Story Hour after the councilmembers expressed opposition to the protests against DSH.

DQSH was banned in Tennessee, but the ban was blocked by a federal judge. As of 2023, bans are being considered in Arkansas, Idaho, Kentucky, Montana, Oklahoma and Utah. In 2022, legislation was proposed in Texas to ban the attendance of minors at Drag Queen Story Hours.

A Drag Queen Story Hour at the Lancaster Public Library in March 2024 was cancelled due to a bomb threat.

== Bans ==
Bans on DSH have been proposed and enacted in several jurisdictions.

Current laws make DSH events illegal in several countries, including Hungary and Russia.

In the United States, DSH is banned in the state of Tennessee (but this was blocked by a federal judge) and bans are being considered in several other states.

== See also ==
- Drag panic
