= The West Christmas Ever =

2019 EP by Nina West

EP by Nina West
- Released: November 8, 2019
- Genres: Christmas; comedy
- Length: 19:00
- Label: Producer Entertainment Group

Nina West chronology
Drag Is Magic / John Goodman (2019)	The West Christmas Ever (2019)

The West Christmas Ever is the third extended play (EP) by American drag performer Nina West, which was released by Producer Entertainment Group on November 8, 2019. The Christmas EP has five original songs and three interludes featuring Jim Cummings; The Vox Ensemble of the Columbus Gay Men's Chorus are featured on "Santa Will Be Gone". "Jingle Juice" has a music video. The EP peaked at number five on Billboard's Comedy Albums chart, and had a generally-positive reception.

== Development ==
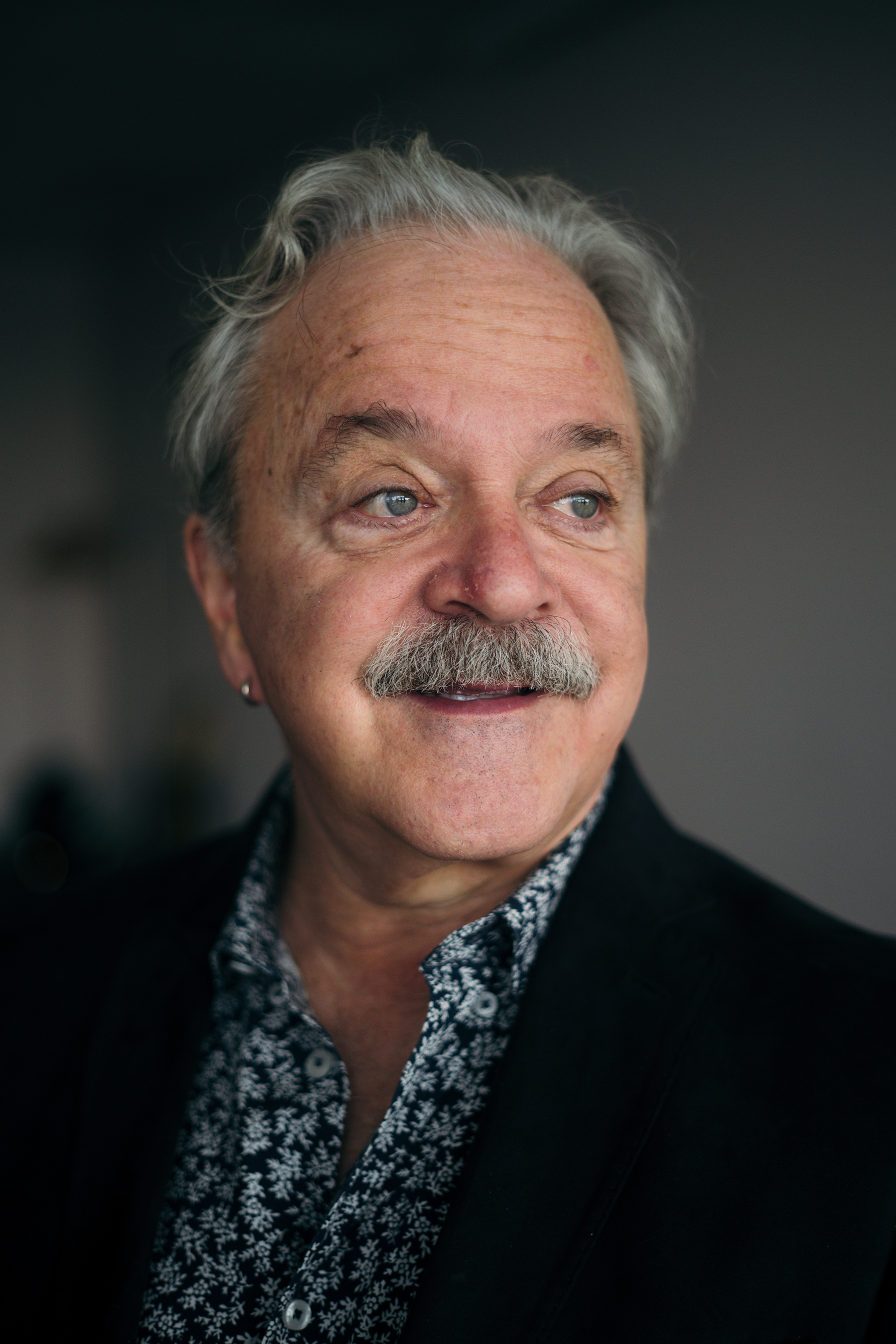
The EP features Jim Cummings (pictured in 2018).

Nina West (Andrew Levitt's drag persona) began work on the project in July 2019. She completed five songs, which she described as "very different" and representative of "all of these different parts of Andrew and Nina respectively, and my sensibilities around the holidays, both in and out of drag".

She met American voice actor and singer Jim Cummings in August, at a D23 event through Cummings' ex-wife and daughter, who are fans of RuPaul's Drag Race, the American reality television series in which Nina West competed (season 11). Needing someone to voice Santa Claus and tie the songs together, West recruited Cummings. In a Billboard interview, she recalled that he agreed to participate "without batting a lash". West described herself as a "lifelong Disney fan" who was "hyper aware of Jim for a long time": "His voice is synonymous with so many Disney characters that you likely are a fan of his without knowing it". She said about working with him:

He was so friendly and lovely. I instantly fell in love with him as a person and when this project was all coming together I knew there was no one I would rather narrate my EP than Jim. He agreed really quickly and we did three takes but the first was the one we used as it was prefect. He was perfect. I still can't believe I have his voice on my EP.

== Composition ==
The EP includes five original songs and three "whimsical" interludes with Cummings ("Santa's Not So Little Helper", "Nina the Extra Elf", and "The West Christmas Ever"). Billboard's Stehen Daw wrote, "The new project sees the star tackling all the genres she can, from country-rock to classic choral Christmas, all while playing up her character as Nina the Elf, and not-so-helpful helper of Santa Claus." "Jingle Juice" was described as a "honky-honk holiday hoedown" by Hollywood Life's Jason Brow. West said that the song was her favorite to sing and record for the EP, and described "Jingle Juice" as having a "rockabilly, Chris Stapleton, stomp-clap, Christmas at a saloon in the North Pole kind of vibe". She said about the song:

I really wanted to come up with a Christmas song that was gonna be like, I don't know, 'Piano Man' meets 'Cheeseburger in Paradise.' And so what we wrote was a song that was all about drinking during the holidays, because, you know, many times for a lot of people like me, there was a year or two where I didn't spend it with my family and I spent it with my chosen family. We'd go to the bar, we'd go to the gay bar and we'd drink. And we would have our Christmas there and celebrate and have cocktails, and just have our family Christmas that way. And it's even now a tradition when I go home for Christmas that I always end up at my favorite local watering hole and meet all of my friends, after I'm done with my family, for a cocktail. So I really wanted to capture that kind of tradition in my own life of meeting my friends out at the bar to celebrate the season.

"Christmas Arrow" commemorates one of West's favorite singers. In "Cha Cha Heels", she declares John Waters' Female Trouble (1974) a Christmas film; West said that the song allows her to connect with her appreciation for Broadway theatre, "like it's a weird extension of Hairspray". In "It's Chris, Miss", she asks Santa Claus for some Hollywood "hunks" under her Christmas tree. West described the song as "ridiculousness" and "really really fun ... because lyrically, it is just so dumb". "Santa Will Be Gone" features the Vox Ensemble of the Columbus Gay Men's Chorus.

== Release and promotion ==
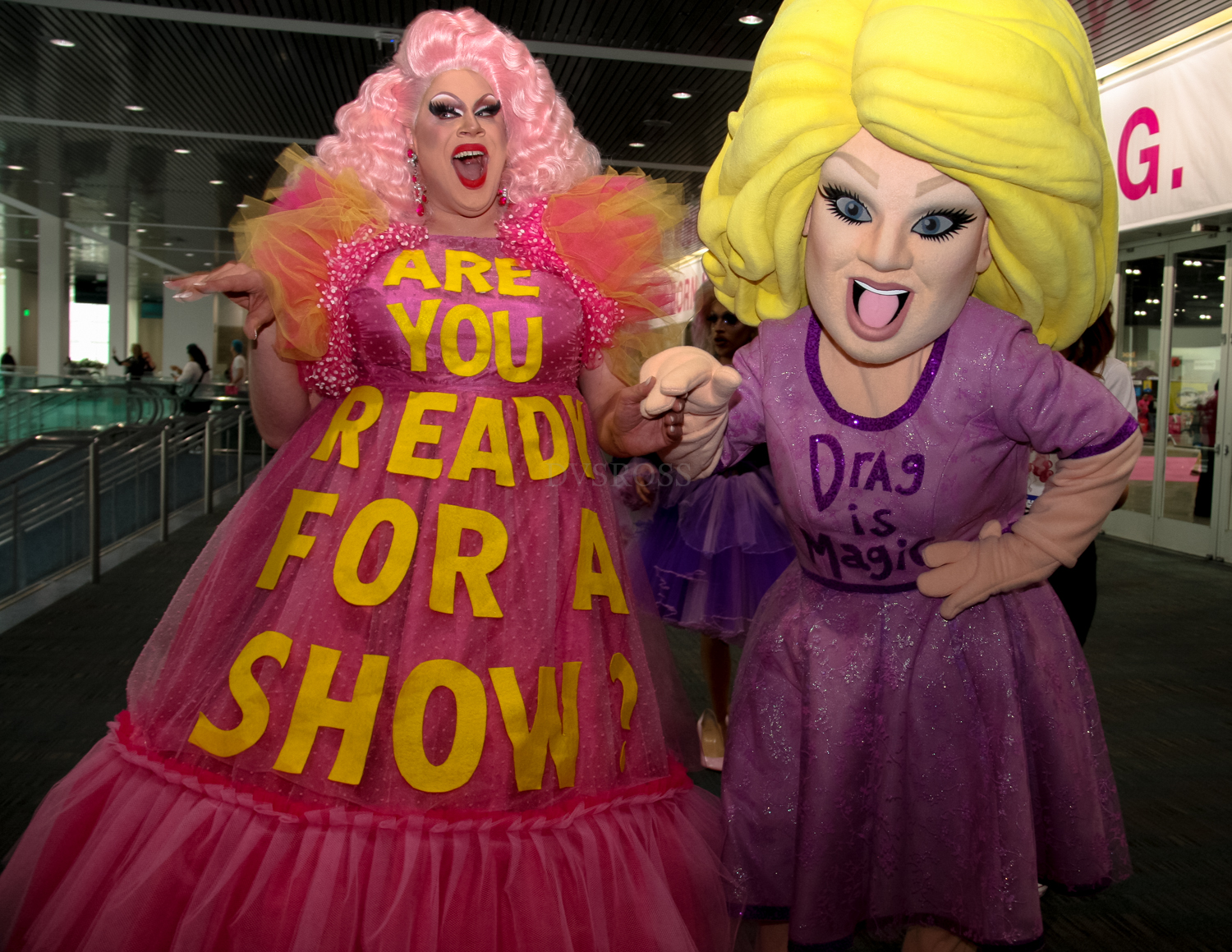
West (left) at RuPaul's DragCon LA in 2019 promoting Drag Is Magic, one of three EPs she released in 2019 along with John Goodman and The West Christmas Ever

The West Christmas Ever was released by Producer Entertainment Group on November 8, 2019, following her previous EPs Drag Is Magic and John Goodman (both released on the same label on May 17, 2019).

"Jingle Juice"'s music video sees West bring the holiday spirit to people "stuck without really celebrating the seasons". She said that the video has "a mix of the Wild West themes" and was influenced by Dolly Parton, Hee Haw and Lady Bunny, one of her favorite entertainers. The video also refers to National Lampoon's Christmas Vacation (1989). According to West, "the idea of going to a town where it was kind of isolated and stuck in a certain time" was an inspiration for the video.

To commemorate West being named National Volunteer Fundraiser of the Year, her foundation launched "The West Christmas Ever — 25 days of Christmas" to present $1,000 grants to LGBTQ+ organizations across the U.S. every day from December 1 to December 25.

== Reception ==
Randy Shulman of Metro Weekly called the collection "as festive and funny as you'd hope", and Decider.com's Brett White said that the EP "is sure to spice up your holiday plans with a bit of that Nina West magic, which is kind of a mix of cinnamon and a warm hug". Jason Brow wrote for Hollywood Life, "Nina gives Santa Claus a run for his money when it comes to spreading the holiday spirit ... her trademark humor is ever-present ...[which]... reminds us that we need to carry this moment of 'peace on earth, goodwill to all' beyond December". According to Brow, "Jingle Juice" "will put the rocking back in your stocking", described its music video as "joyous", and called "It's Chris, Miss" "hilarious". The EP peaked at number five on Billboard's Comedy Albums chart.

== Track listing ==
Track listing adapted from AllMusic and the Apple Store

No.	Title	Length
1.	"Santa's Not So Little Helper (featuring Jim Cummings)"	0:48
2.	"Jingle Juice"	3:18
3.	"Christmas Arrow"	3:15
4.	"Nina the Extra Elf (featuring Jim Cummings)"	1:12
5.	"Cha Cha Heels"	3:23
6.	"It's Chris, Miss"	3:26
7.	"Santa Will Be Gone (featuring The Vox Ensemble of the Columbus Gay Men's Chorus)"	3:11
8.	"The West Christmas Ever (featuring Jim Cummings)"	0:46
Total length:		19:00

== Charts ==
Chart (2019)	Peak position
US Comedy Albums (Billboard)	5
