= John Goodman (EP) =

EP by Nina West
- Released: May 17, 2019
- Genre: Comedy
- Length: 17:03
- Label: Producer Entertainment Group

Nina West chronology
Drag Is Magic (2019)	John Goodman (2019)	The West Christmas Ever (2019)

Singles from John Goodman
- 1. "Hucks" Released: May 10, 2019

John Goodman is a comedy EP by American drag performer Nina West, released on May 17, 2019.

== Composition ==
Nina West said of the EP, which is named after the American actor: "With John Goodman, it's a comedy album of five songs around themes of people around my size. Lol! Then it also has this idea of pop culture and celebrity. The first song [sic] is about Sarah Huckabee Sanders so I am using my drag scene to be political, but also having fun with it in the process." The comedy EP focuses on politics and popular culture. The music video for "Hucks", a song about Sarah Huckabee Sanders, features Aurora Sexton, Jackie Beat, and Sherry Vine.

== Track listing ==
Track listing adapted from the iTunes Store All songs written by Nina West, Ashley Levy, and Mark Byers.

No.	Title	Length
1.	"John Goodman"	3:27
2.	"Hucks"	3:26
3.	"Divine"	3:10
4.	"Hemsworth"	3:24
5.	"Janelle"	3:36
Total length:		17:03

== Charts ==
Chart (2019)	Peak position
US Comedy Albums (Billboard)	2
