= Axis Nightclub =

Gay bar and nightclub in Columbus, Ohio, U.S.

Coordinates: 39°58′41.0″N 83°0′16.1″W

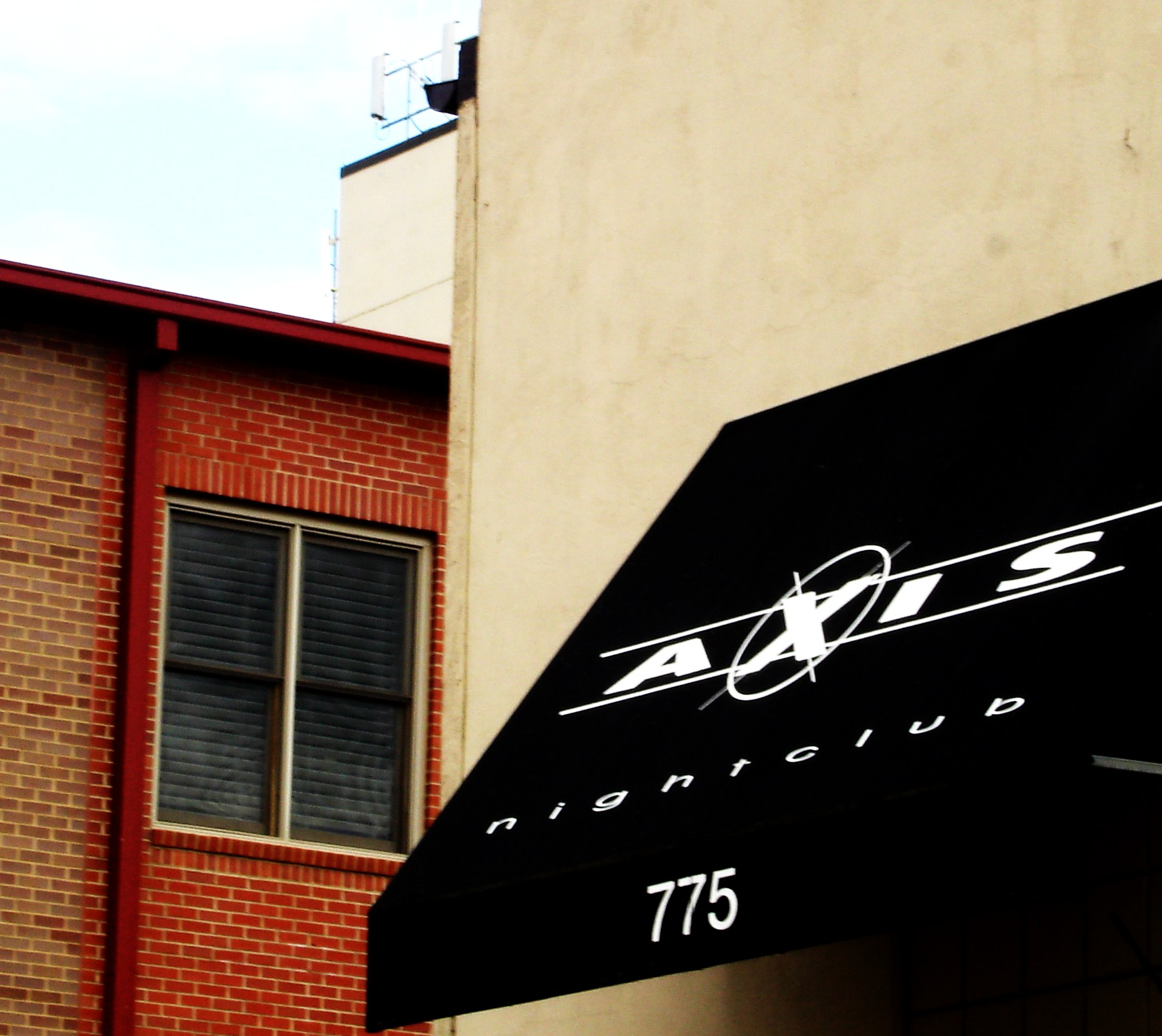
- Signage
- Interactive map of Axis Nightclub
- Address: 775 North High Street
- Location: Columbus, Ohio, U.S.
- Type: Gay bar

Axis Nightclub is a gay bar and nightclub in The Short North, Columbus, Ohio.

== Description ==
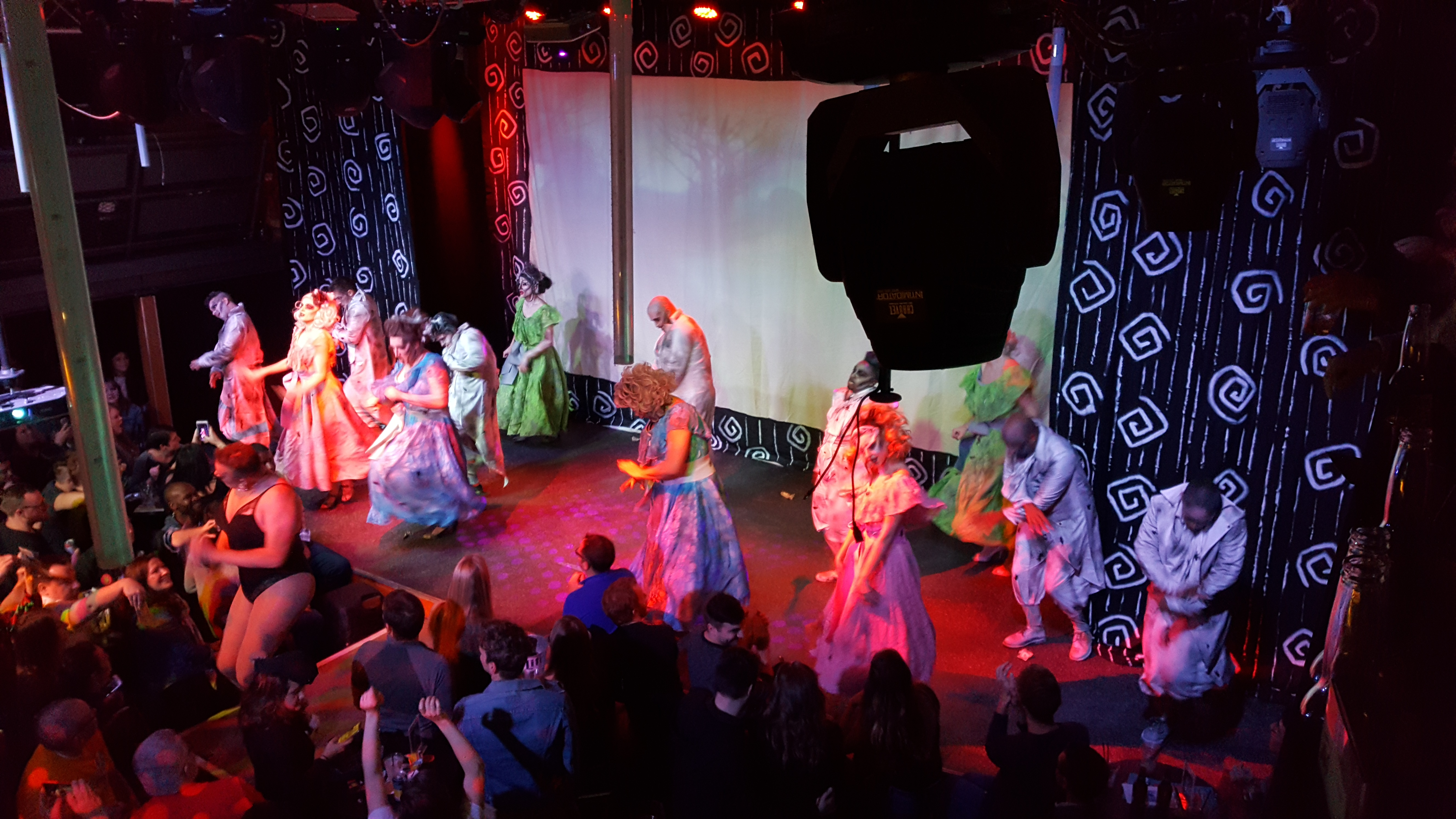
Nina West performing in her annual Halloween show at Axis, 2018

The multi-level dance club has hosted drag acts and competitions ("So You Think You Can Drag?"), including Miss Gay Heart of America and performances by RuPaul's Drag Race contestants Alaska Thunderfuck, Asia O'Hara, BenDeLaCreme, Bianca Del Rio, Sasha Velour, Shangela, and Yuhua Hamasaki, among others. Local drag queen Nina West hosts the show "Heels of Horror" annually, as well as drag competitions.

Rajesh Lahoti is an owner of the bar.

Axis has been described at Columbus' most popular gay bar. In 2001, the bar's general manager estimated that 20 to 25 percent of clientele were Ohio State University students. In 2014, Axis' fifth annual "Night of 100 Drag Queens" reportedly broke the record for the largest drag show, with 55 participants, who performed to "It's Raining Men". Also in 2014, Axis hosted the inaugural Shooting Star Awards, and won the award for Best Nightclub. The nightclub hosted Miss Gay USofA at Large in 2016.

== Reception ==
Shawnie Kelley, author of Insiders' Guide to Columbus, Ohio (2003), said the bar "is becoming a staple of Columbus nightlife for gay and straight, men and women alike".

== See also ==
- List of LGBTQ bars
