= Laura Edwards-Leeper =

American psychologist

- Years active: 2007-present

Academic background
- Education: Bowling Green State University (PhD); Lewis & Clark College (BA)

Academic work
- Discipline: Clinical psychology
- Sub-discipline: Gender psychology
- Website: drlauraedwardsleeper.com

Laura Edwards-Leeper is an American psychologist and founder of the first pediatric gender clinic of the United States. She also served as head of the Child and Adolescent Committee for the World Professional Association for Transgender Health.

Edwards-Leeper has advocated for better training of gender therapists and increased diligence in assessing mental health issues before assigning medical interventions such as puberty blockers and cross-sex hormones to patients.

== Career ==
Edwards-Leeper started practicing psychology in 2007. She founded and served at the first American pediatric gender clinic at the Boston Children's Hospital, where she helped transgender teenagers and young adults transition. Edwards-Leeper has worked as a professor at the School of Graduate Psychology at the Pacific University.

She is the first clinician to use a Dutch protocol of puberty-blocking transition (originated at the Center of Expertise on Gender Dysphoria) in the United States.

== Stances on transgender youth ==
Edwards-Leeper said in a 2024 New York Times interview that, in the beginning of her career, most of her patients had deep-seated and long-standing gender dysphoria, but that ceased to be the case in recent years, with many of her recent patients reporting no history of gender dysphoria. She further stated that, when treating young people who identify as transgender, "you have to take time to really assess what's going on and hear the timeline and get the parents' perspective in order to create an individualized treatment plan. Many providers are completely missing that step."

In an article published on the Washington Post, Edwards-Leeper said that she opposed state bans on gender-related treatment for minors, but warned that some American providers were skipping comprehensive assessments and "hastily dispensing medicine". "We cannot carry on in this field that involves permanently changing young people’s bodies if we don't fully understand what we're doing and learn from those we fail," she said in another interview.

When questioned by Lesley Stahl about whether gender psychologists accepted what young patients say too hastily, Edwards-Leeper stated that many professionals are afraid of speaking up and not being seen as gender affirming to or hurting the transgender community.

Edwards-Leeper stated that Lisa Littman's studies on detransitioners is a "critical preliminary step toward shedding light on" this population. She said that multiple online publications report such people feeling that they had not received proper medical evaluation prior to transitioning.
