= Drag Is Magic =

2019 children's EP by Nina West

EP by Nina West
- Released: May 17, 2019
- Genre: Children's music
- Length: 17:42
- Label: Producer Entertainment Group

Nina West chronology
| Drag Is Magic (2019) | John Goodman (2019) |

Drag Is Magic is a children's EP by American drag performer Nina West, released by Producer Entertainment Group on May 17, 2019, alongside her comedy and political EP John Goodman, following her departure from the eleventh season of RuPaul's Drag Race. Music videos were made for both the title track and "The Drag Alphabet", with the former serving as the EP's lead single. Nina West promoted the songs on her similarly titled 2019 World of Wonder series, Drag Is Magic with Nina West, and in 2020 during the Digital Drag Fest series. The EP peaked at number nine on Billboard's Kids Albums chart.

== Composition ==
The EP has ten tracks, including five original songs "geared toward educating and entertaining children" and five interludes. Nina West hoped the songs would inspire young listeners to "dream big, be kind, and be their perfect selves". She said of the collection of songs: "I always wanted to do a kids' album and have been writing it for the last ten years. This was really in my wheelhouse and I felt very connected and wanted to be a voice for children and family. I wanted to show that content created by a drag queen can be for anyone and consumed by everyone."

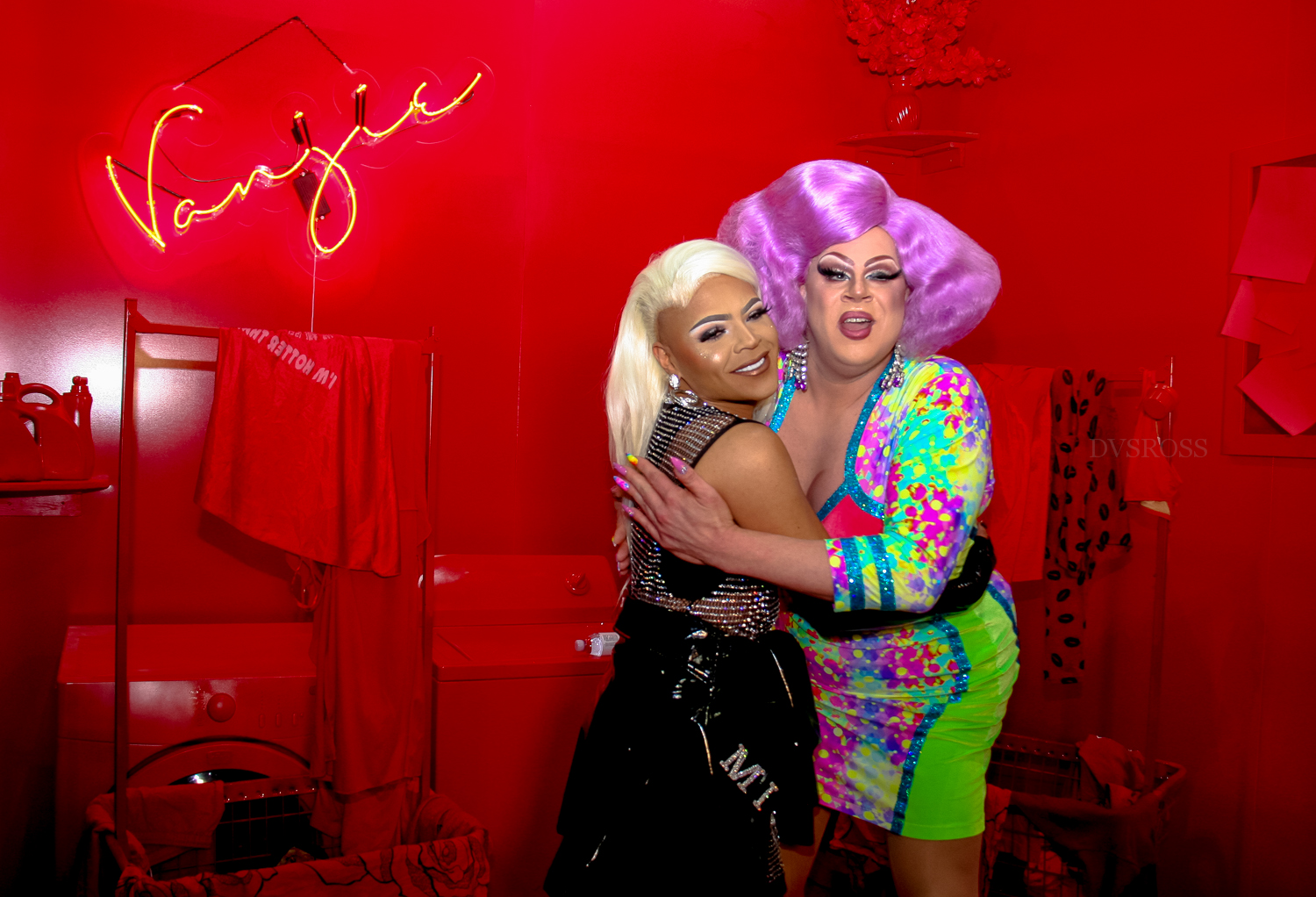
Vanessa Vanjie Mateo (left) and Nina West (right) in 2019; the former is featured on the track "The Kitty Girl County Spelling Bee (Interlude)".

In "Drag Is Magic", Nina West explains drag, singing: "What is drag? Drag is dress-up for girls and boys, and it's pretty hard to mess up. All you got to do is imagine what you want to be!" Attitude described the title track as a "sing-a-long ditty designed to encourage youngsters to love drag, dress up, and be themselves". Nina West has said the song is "an opportunity for children to get creative and think outside the boxes us silly adults have crafted for them". In "The Drag Alphabet", Nina West introduces "some of her favorite slang in the business" using the alphabet, with lyrics like "A is for absolutely" and "Z is for Zsa Zsa". She said of the song: "I have wanted to build a really solid foundation of a relationship in children's spaces for drag, and for drag entertainment to enter those spaces. So what a better way to revisit this idea and this topic than to start with the alphabet?" Decider.com's Brett White called the song a "campy, fun, larger-than-life 'Drag Race' take on the ABCs".

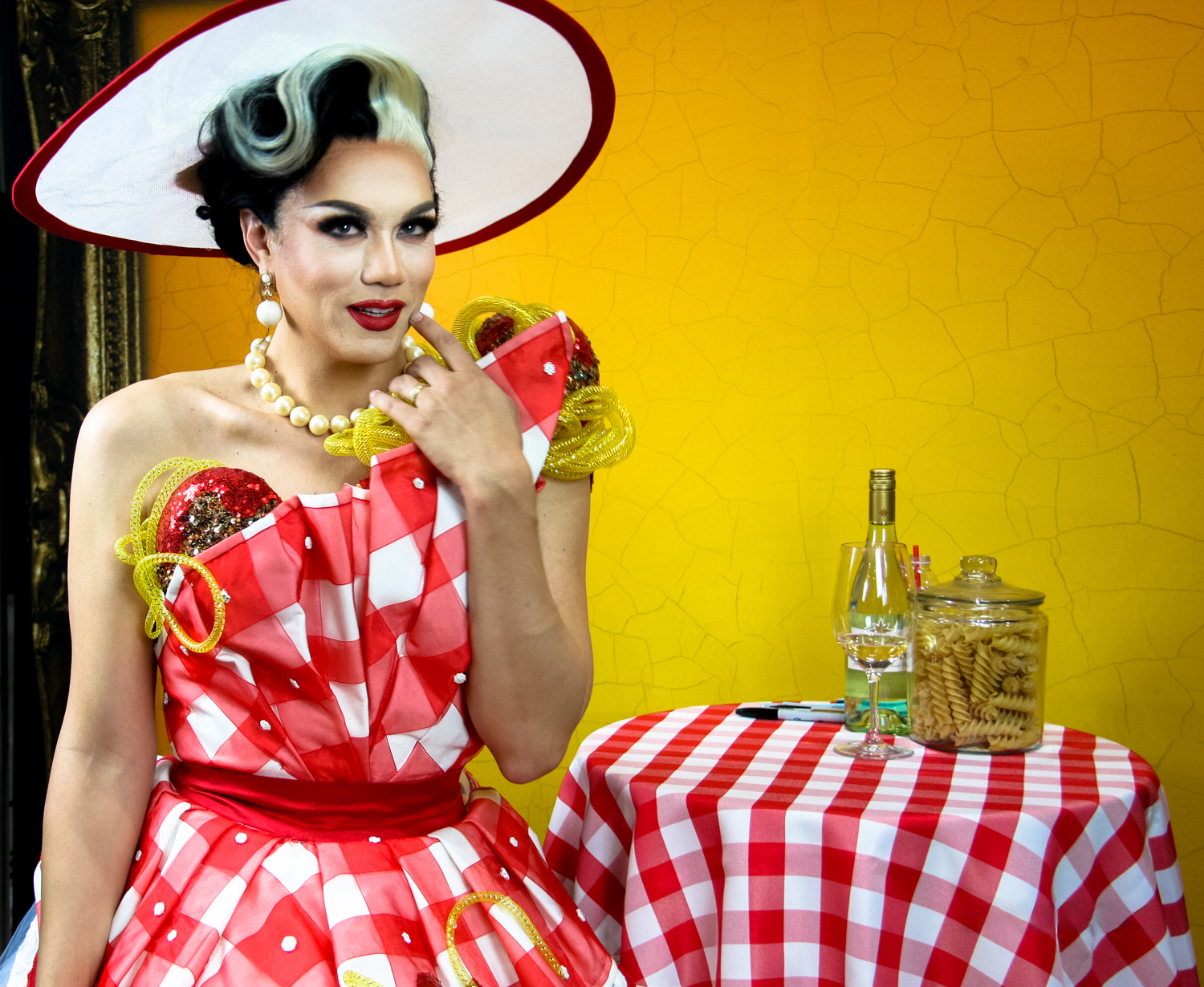
Manila Luzon in 2019

Other songs include "What Makes Us Shine", "The Reading Song", and "Go Big, Be Kind, Be You". "The Kitty Girl County Spelling Bee (Interlude)" features fellow RuPaul's Drag Race alumnae Manila Luzon and Vanessa Vanjie Mateo.

== Promotion ==
Nina West released Drag Is Magic as well as the comedy and political EP John Goodman on May 17, 2019, following her departure from the eleventh season of RuPaul's Drag Race. Drag Queen Story Hour programs were a topic of debate in the United States around this time, and drag performers were considering new ways to engage with younger audiences.

In June 2019, the production company World of Wonder announced that Drag Is Magic with Nina West, featuring songs from her EP and other comedic sketches based on 1990s youth programming, would premiere in September. The EP inspired the series, which was part of the "Sickening Summer Series" by streaming service WOW Presents Plus. In 2020, Nina West hosted Homeschool with Nina, a family-friendly half hour show featuring songs from the EP, as part of the Digital Drag Fest series.

=== Music videos ===
The music video for the lead single "Drag Is Magic" starts with Nina West dressed as a Mrs. Doubtfire-inspired nanny with a cardigan and glasses, reading to four children. She turns on the kids' "favorite" video, which features Nina West in a bright pink dress and a variety of other costumes, becoming a pirate, a princess, and a "trash-bag queen". By the end of the video, the children are wearing costumes as well, appearing as pirates, police officers, and princesses. Attitude and Pride.com's Rachel Kiley called the music video "almost too charming to bear" and "pretty damn adorable", respectively. Kiley wrote, "It's catchy and clean fun for the whole family, and even adult fans who don't have kids are appreciative of the effort Nina is putting into both making family friendly drag as well as reaching out to kids who may already know that they want to do some exploring outside of gender norms." Stefania Sarrubba of Gay Star News called the video "the cutest".

Nina West released a music video for "The Drag Alphabet" in February 2020. It features her teaching a group of seven children about drag using the alphabet; the group forms a conga line at the end of the video. Two of the children are deaf and translate the song's lyrics into American Sign Language, as Nina West wanted to give representation to the deaf and hard-of-hearing community at a friend's request. The video was directed by Brad Hammer; Aurora Sexton served as art director and David Charpentier, Jacob Slane, Ryan Aceto, and Nina West (credited as Andrew Levitt) were executive producers.

== Reception ==
HuffPost's Curtis M. Wong said the EP's songs have a "playfully educational approach", and Rachel Kiley of Pride.com called the collection of songs "perfect, family-friendly fun". Attitude described the title track as "adorably heartwarming", and LGBTQ Nation's Alex Bollinger called the song and music video "super catchy". Gay Star News' Stefania Sarrubba said that the song "Drag Is Magic" is "everything you wish you had listened to when you were a kid".

Michael Cook of Instinct called "The Drag Alphabet" "immediately infectious" and wrote, "The track is instantly catchy, with plenty of Drag Race references that long-term fans will appreciate, along with some truly clever matches (I mean, in "The Drag Alphabet", what else would "D" stand for other than "Divine")?" Furthermore, he said that the team behind the song and its video created a "track that fits perfectly with the wonderfully inclusive brand that West has crafted".

== Track listing ==
Track listing adapted from the iTunes Store with credits taken from Spotify.

| No. | Title | Writer(s) | Length |
|---|---|---|---|
| 1. | "Up in the Attic (Interlude)" | Andrew Levitt, Ashley Levy, Kara Klenk, Mark Byers | 0:46 |
| 2. | "Drag Is Magic" | Levitt, Levy, Byers | 3:10 |
| 3. | "The Kitty Girl County Spelling Bee (Interlude)" (featuring Manila Luzon and Vanessa Vanjie Mateo)" | Levitt, Levy, Klenk, Byers | 2:48 |
| 4. | "The Drag Alphabet" | Levitt, Levy, Byers, Patricia Taylor | 1:37 |
| 5. | "A View from Space (Interlude)" | Levitt, Levy, Klenk, Byers | 1:56 |
| 6. | "What Makes Us Shine" | Levitt, Levy, Byers, Taylor | 1:47 |
| 7. | "What Is Reading? (Interlude)" | Levitt, Levy, Klenk, Byers | 1:07 |
| 8. | "The Reading Song" | Levitt, Levy, Byers | 2:03 |
| 9. | "The Best Thing You Can Be (Interlude)" | Levitt, Levy, Klenk, Byers | 0:59 |
| 10. | "Go Big, Be Kind, Be You" | Levitt, Levy, Byers | 1:28 |
| Total length: | | | 17:42 |

== Charts ==
| Chart (2019) | Peak position |
|---|---|
| US Kid Albums (Billboard) | 9 |
