= Columbus Gay Men's Chorus =

The Columbus Gay Men's Chorus (CGMC) is a chorus located in Ohio. It was founded in 1990 by five artists. The non-auditioned chorus seeks to foster increased recognition, understanding and acceptance of gay men, lesbians, bisexuals and transgender persons.

== History ==
The Columbus Gay Men's Chorus was conceived at a Christmas party for the group Gay and Professional, hosted by Mark Cooke and Dan Huff. As attendees sang Christmas carols around the piano being played by Cooke the idea arose that Columbus needed its own gay men's chorus. The Columbus Gay Men's Chorus was founded in January 1990 by five individuals: Doug Althauser, Kevin Gary, Bob Germain, Phil Martin, and Jack Wisniewski. After months of discussion and research, the five incorporated the Chorus and began rehearsals in September of that year. Rehearsals were held at St. Stephen's Episcopal Church and the debut concert took place on December 9, 1990 at the Thurber Theater on the Ohio State University campus. Fifty-one men sang in that first concert.

In 1990, the Chorus hired David Price as its inaugural Artistic Director. Price served seven years directing the chorus and helping establish strong traditions and musical performances. During this time, Price took the Chorus to its very first GALA Festival performance in Denver, Colorado.

During this time, the Chorus released its first CD, Stepping Out. The Chorus again went to GALA with Price in 1996.

In 1997, the chorus hired David Monseur as the new Artistic Director. Monseur served as the director of the Chorus until 2010. Under his guidance, the Chorus held its first Joy! Concert at the King Avenue United Methodist Church.

Over the years there have been several highlights of note for the Chorus. Monseur expanded the Chorus by founding Illuminati, which internationally debuted at the GALA Festival in Montreal, Canada. CGMC released another CD: Joy!.

In 1999, Ann Hampton Calloway performed with the Chorus and dedicated one of her songs in memory of the Chorus's accompanist, Robin Rakes. The Chorus has also performed with other arts groups including: ProMusica, Ballet Met, Opera Columbus, Anna and the Annadroids, Cincinnati Men's Chorus, and other established singing groups. The Chorus has also performed for the Ohio Democratic Party Fundraising dinner, where Ohio Governor Ted Strickland accepted and wore a Chorus pin.

In 2010, CGMC hired Dr. Timothy Sarsany as its Artistic Director, succeeding David Monseur. The Artistic Director handles all artistic and programming aspects of the organization and works to increase the organization's presence in the community. In June 2015, Broadway Diva impressionist Christine Pedi performed with the chorus on "Divas: Dead or Alive". On July 4, 2015, CGMC performed with the Columbus Symphony Orchestra on their "Patriotic Pops" concert, not only the first time CGMC teamed up with the CSO, but also the first time a chorus was featured on their July 4 program.

In 2019, Jared Bollenbacher was named the Columbus Gay Men’s Chorus’ new artistic director following the tenure of Dr. Timothy Sarsany.

== Performances ==
Performances performs an annual holiday show.

In June 2025 the Chorus celebrated its 35th anniversary as well as Pride Month with a “35-N-Thrivin'” concert.

=== Recordings ===
- Stepping Out; 1995
- Joy! - Holiday CD; 2005
- Rocket Man - The music of Elton John; 2008
- Joy! to the World - Holiday CD; 2013
- Joy! 2018 - Holiday CD; 2018
