= Virgie Tovar =

American author, podcaster, and activist

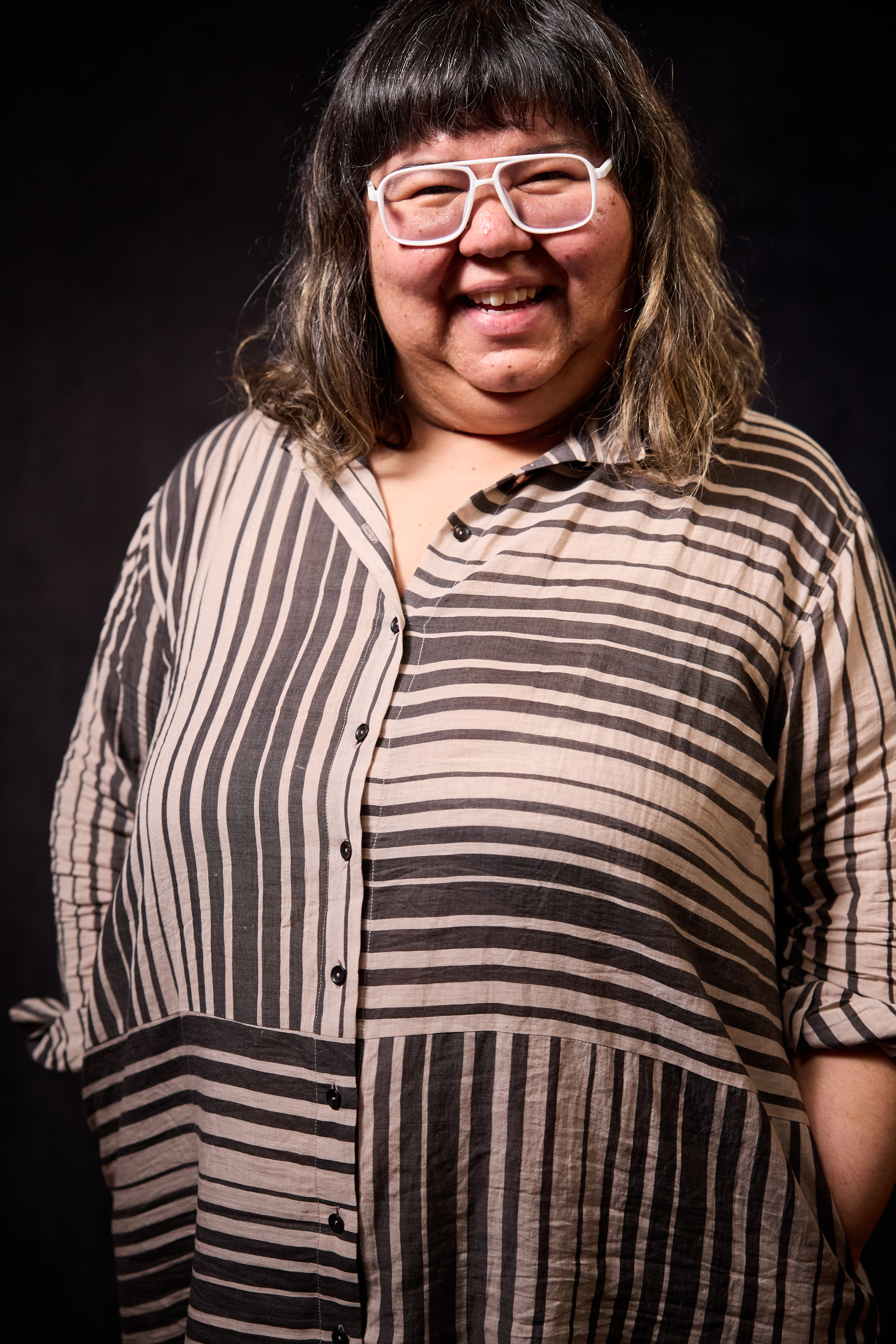
- Tovar at the 2024 Sundance Film Festival
- Born: May 19, 1982 (age 44); San Francisco, California, U.S.
- Occupations: Author and podcaster
- Years active: 2012–present
- Website: www.virgietovar.com

Virgie Tovar, (/ˈvɜːrdʒi ˈtoʊvɑːr/ VUR-jee TOH-var; born May 19, 1982) is an American author, lecturer, and weight-based discrimination speaker. She writes about fat acceptance, anti-fat bias, and diet culture. She was the host of The Virgie Show on CBS Radio and the podcast, Rebel Eaters Club (produced by Transmitter Media).

== Early life and education ==
Tovar is of Mexican descent. She has struggled with weight issues since childhood. In middle school she struggled with an eating disorder.

Tovar received her bachelor's degree in political science from University of California, Berkeley in 2005 and her Master of Arts in Human Sexuality Studies from San Francisco State University.

== Career ==
In 2013 Tovar criticized the American Medical Association for classifying obesity as a disease. She began the #LoseHateNotWeight campaign to highlight the impacts of diet culture and educate people about the importance of ending weight-based discrimination. Tovar has advocated for legal protection against weight discrimination. Tovar has been accused of downplaying the negative effects of obesity.

In 2018, she started a four week online course to support women who wanted to break their obsession with diet culture. Tovar is an ongoing contributor for Forbes. and has authored several books and articles. In 2014, Tovar appeared in the documentary Fattitude. She has been profiled in the New York Times and the San Francisco Chronicle and has appeared on NPR and BBC Mundo. Tovar was also the host of the Webby Award-nominated podcast, Rebel Eaters Club, produced by Transmitter Media for three seasons.

Tovar has received Yale's Poynter Fellowship in Journalism, the Anne G. Locascio Memorial Scholarship from the Mendocino Coast Writers Conference, the Inspire Award from Project HEAL, and three individual artist commissions from the San Francisco Arts Commission.

In December 2024, Tovar was hired for six months as a consultant on "weight stigma and weight neutrality" by the San Francisco Department of Public Health.

== Controversies ==
Tovar’s public statements and advocacy have prompted criticism in several spheres.

In a 2022 interview, she asserted that “no one has to be healthy,” arguing that health should not be framed as a moral obligation. The remark has been criticized by commentators who argue that such messaging may normalize unhealthy behaviors or undermine public health guidance on diet and exercise.

Within workplace-bias trainings and advice columns, Tovar has suggested employees “talk less or not at all” about topics such as exercise, dieting, or body size in professional settings, warning that such discussions can perpetuate stigma. Opponents counter that this approach could discourage wellness initiatives or undervalue widely recognized physical and mental health benefits of physical activity.

Tovar has also criticized “fitspiration” culture as rooted in shame and ableism, a stance praised by some as a critique of toxic fitness messaging but viewed by others as potentially discouraging of healthy physical activity.

In December 2024, the San Francisco Department of Public Health retained Tovar as a short-term consultant on weight stigma and weight neutrality, a move that drew mixed reactions. Supporters described the hiring as a step toward reducing discrimination in health settings, while critics characterized it as politically motivated “woke overreach.”

Earlier in her career, Tovar launched the #LoseHateNotWeight campaign, which received both praise for challenging diet culture and criticism from detractors who argued it downplayed potential health implications of obesity.

== Works ==
=== Books ===
- Hot & Heavy: Fierce Fat Girls on Life, Love & Fashion. Seattle, WA: Seal Press. 2012. ISBN 978-1-58005-469-0. OCLC 818110486. Partial preview at Google Books.
- You Have the Right to Remain Fat. New York, NY: Feminist Press. 2018. ISBN 978-1-936932-32-0. OCLC 1010588354. Partial preview at Google Books.
- The Self-Love Revolution: Radical Body Positivity for Girls of Color. Oakland, CA: Instant Help Books, an imprint of New Harbinger Publications, Inc. 2020. ISBN 978-1-68403-412-3. OCLC 1153151114. Partial preview at Google Books.

=== Articles ===
- "FREEDOM, FAILURE, AND REBELLION: The Queer Art of Being a Fat, Mexican Chichona". Chicana/Latina Studies. 12 (2). Mujeres Activas en Letras y Cambio Social (MALCS): 142–147. 2013. ISSN 1550-2546. JSTOR 43943334. OCLC 9973583234.
- "Why Is Our Culture Preoccupied With How BIPOC Children Eat?". The Sociological Review Magazine. October 2, 2020. doi:10.51428/tsr.vezg6527. ISSN 2754-1371.
- "27. Fat". Keywords for Gender and Sexuality Studies. New York: New York University Press. 2021. doi:10.18574/nyu/9781479808168.003.0031. ISBN 978-1-4798-0816-8. OCLC 1273974125.
