= Nina West =

American drag queen

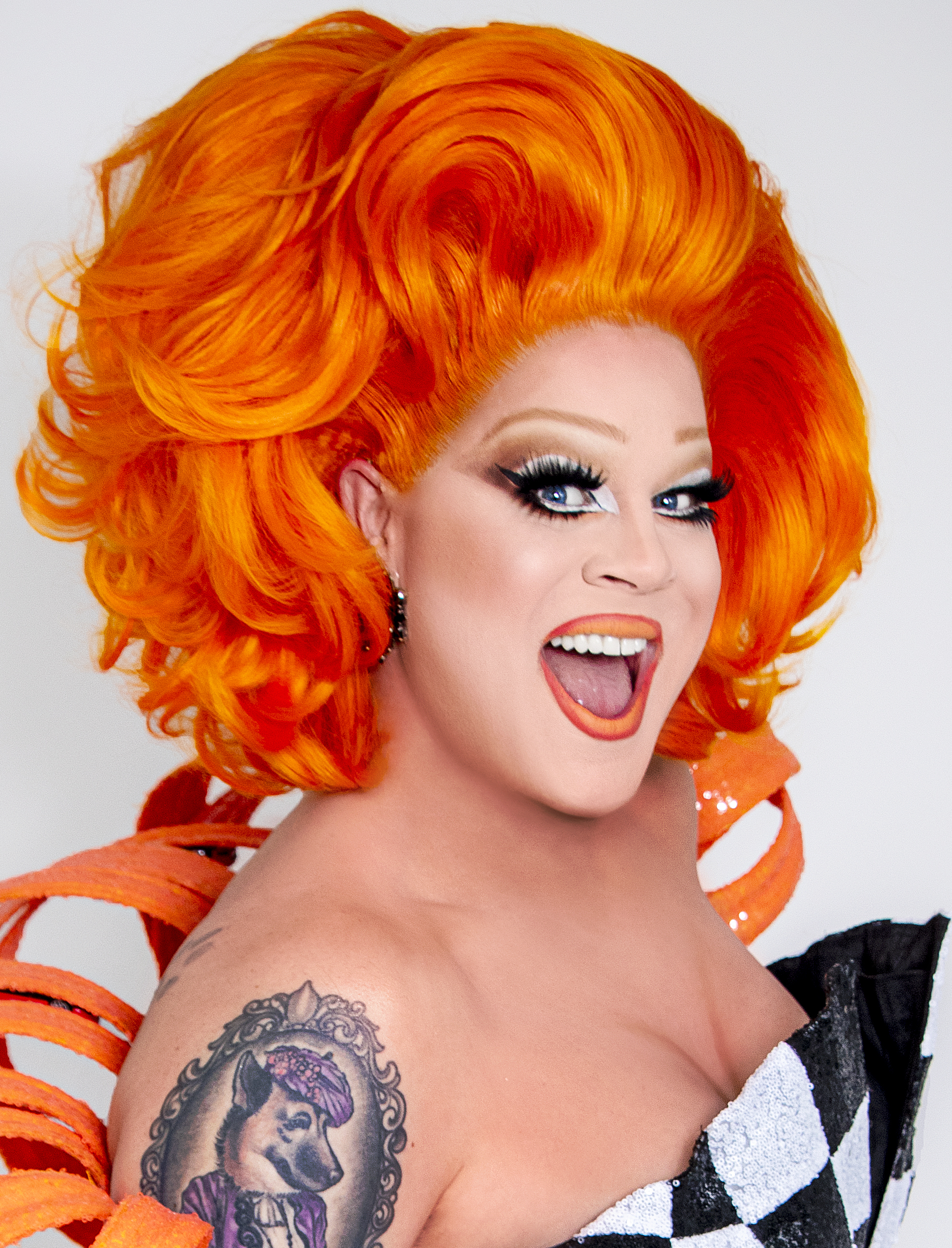
- Nina West in 2020
- Born: Andrew Robert Levitt; Greentown, Ohio, U.S.
- Education: Denison University (BA)
- Occupations: Drag queen, actor, singer
- Years active: 2001–present
- Known for: RuPaul's Drag Race (season 11)
- Title: Miss Congeniality
- Predecessor: Monét X Change
- Successor: Heidi N Closet
- Website: ninawest.com

Andrew Robert Levitt, better known by the stage name Nina West, is an American drag queen, queer activist, actor, and singer-songwriter based in Columbus, Ohio. She rose to national prominence with her appearance on the eleventh season of RuPaul's Drag Race, where she placed sixth and won Miss Congeniality. In 2024, she competed in season 9 of RuPaul's Drag Race All Stars. She was named the Top Local Artist of 2019 by Columbus Underground. Levitt has also created three EPs—Drag Is Magic, John Goodman, and The West Christmas Ever, which were all released in 2019.

== Early life ==
Levitt was raised in Greentown, Ohio. He attended Canton Central Catholic High School. He has a degree in theater from Denison University, where he received harassment and death threats due to being gay. He planned to pursue acting, but decided not to move to New York City, due to the September 11 attacks.

== Career ==
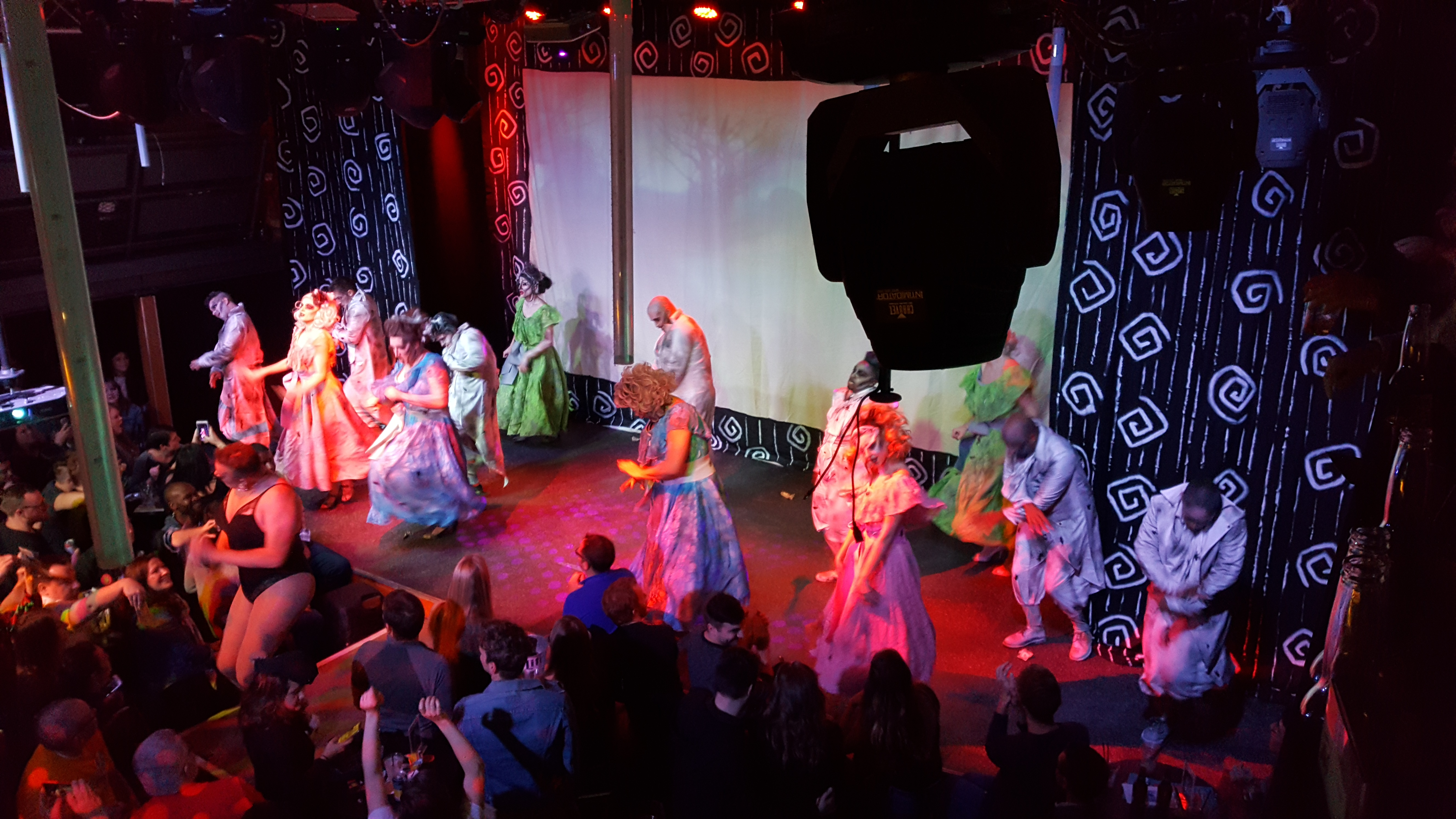
Levitt performing in his annual Halloween show, Axis Nightclub, 2018

Levitt began dabbling in drag in 2001. Nina West is the name of his drag persona. Her drag mother is Virginia West. Nina West hosts the annual "Heels of Horror" show at Axis Nightclub, and has also hosted the competition "So You Think You Can Drag?" In 2008, she won the Entertainer of the Year award; her ensemble later inspired the singer Sia's outfit at the 2016 Coachella Valley Music and Arts Festival.

Nina West competed in the eleventh season of RuPaul's Drag Race. She had previously auditioned for the show nine times, but failed to make the final cast selection. She won the third episode for his performance in the 'Diva Worship' challenge, and impersonated Sarah Sanders on the fourth episode, "Trump: The Rusical". In the "Snatch Game" challenge, she became the first queen in the show's history to impersonate someone from the actual original Match Game, with her impersonation of Jo Anne Worley. She then won the "Dragracadabra" challenge in episode ten. She was eliminated in the following episode, losing a lip-sync to Silky Nutmeg Ganache. She was subsequently crowned Miss Congeniality in the series finale. After her elimination, a number of celebrities and public figures took to social media to voice their support for Nina West, including Rep. Alexandria Ocasio-Cortez and Scott Hoying. Levitt reported that Rihanna sent him a private message following her elimination.

A street in Columbus was named after Levitt, called "The Nina West Way". Nina West was interviewed with Adore Delano and Monet X Change for an episode of The View in June 2019. She starred in Coaster, an animated short film directed and produced by Amos Sussigan and Dan Lund. She attended the 71st Primetime Emmy Awards, where she became the first person to walk the purple carpet in full drag. Nina West was announced as part of the cast for the first ever season of RuPaul's Secret Celebrity Drag Race, a spin-off where Drag Race alumni transform celebrities into drag queens, premiering in 2020.

Since Drag Race, Levitt has starred in several commercials, with some of the brands including Pantene, Pepsi, and OraQuick, as well as being involved in campaigns for films such as Trolls World Tour and Maleficent: Mistress of Evil. In 2019, World of Wonder announced that West was to host a children's-oriented program featuring "songs and comedy bits inspired by youth programming of the ’90s" entitled Drag Is Magic. However, as of 2023, the series is yet to be released. In May 2021, the children's television channel Nickelodeon released an animated short on YouTube featuring an animated pride parade hosted by Levitt that showed a variety of diverse animal families, including those with same-sex parents and non-binary characters. The next month, on June 5, 2021, Nickelodeon also released an advertisement featuring Levitt to explain to children the meaning of Pride as a part of their Pride month celebration.

Levitt was included in Columbus Business First's "40 Under 40" list in 2018. He worked as a social media strategist for Axis Nightclub as of 2018 and has done social media and marketing for Union Cafe since 2013. He plays Edna Turnblad in the musical Hairspray for the 2021-2022 national tour.

On April 23, 2024, Levitt was announced as one of the eight contestants competing on the ninth season of RuPaul's Drag Race All Stars.

=== Music ===
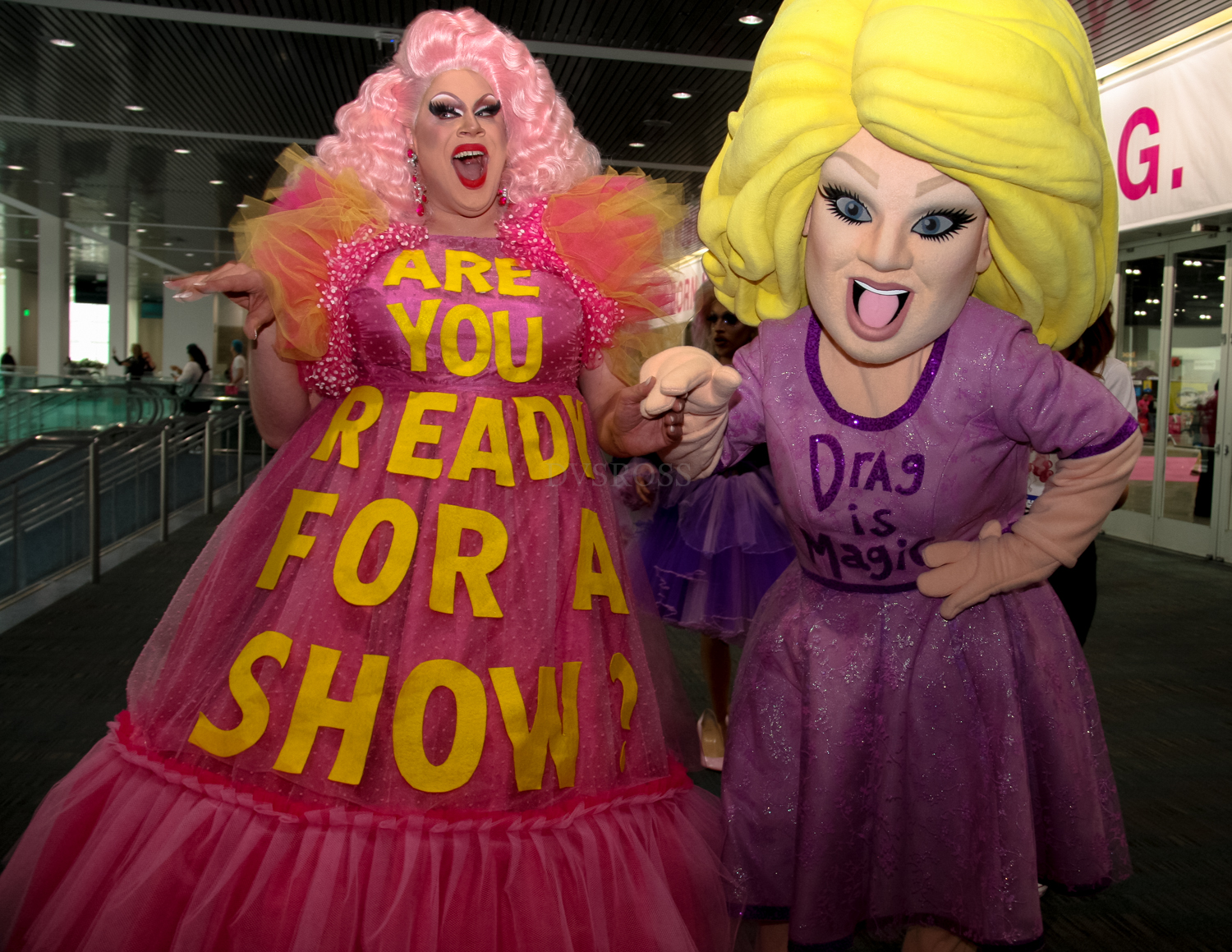
Levitt as West promoting Drag Is Magic at RuPaul DragCon 2019 in Los Angeles

After her elimination, Levitt announced that she would release a children's music album, Drag Is Magic, and a comedy EP, John Goodman, by May 17, 2019. She released a music video for her first single "Hucks" on May 10, 2019.

== Personal life and philanthropy ==
Levitt is gay and an advocate and fundraiser for the LGBTQIA community. His focuses have included HIV/AIDS testing and safe sex, marriage equality, trans rights, and childhood education. The Nina West Fund, established at The Columbus Foundation c. 2015, is thought to be the only "drag-queen-supported fund of its kind" in the U.S. The fund has raised more than $2 million, supporting charities such as the ACLU of Ohio (fundamental rights), Dress for Success Columbus (career development for women), Equitas Health (focused on HIV/AIDS treatment), and Kaleidoscope Youth Center (the largest LGBTQIA youth center in Ohio).

In 2017, she received the Create Columbus Commission Visionary Award from the Columbus City Council and an equality award from the Human Rights Campaign Columbus chapter.

In 2019 Nina West/Andrew Levitt was honored by Stonewall Columbus as the Grand Marshal of Columbus's 38th Annual Pride Festival and Parade and the City of Columbus' Steven Shellaberger Illuminator Award for her work promoting LGBTQ rights.

He lives in Columbus, Ohio.

== Discography ==
=== Extended plays ===
List of studio albums, with selected chart positions and album details
Title	Details	Peak chart positions	
Title	Details	US Kids	US Comedy
Drag Is Magic	Released: May 17, 2019; Label: Producer Entertainment Group; Formats: Digital download	9	—
John Goodman	Released: May 17, 2019; Label: Producer Entertainment Group; Formats: Digital download	—	2
The West Christmas Ever	Released: November 8, 2019; Label: Producer Entertainment Group; Formats: Digital download	—	5

=== Singles ===
Title	Year	Album
"Hucks"	2019	John Goodman
"Treat Yourself”	2019	Non-album singles
"Lisa Frankenstein" (featuring Bobby Moynihan)	2019	Non-album singles
"Nina the Vampire Slayer"	2020	Non-album singles
"Quarantine Dream"	2020	Non-album singles

== Filmography ==
=== Film ===
Year	Title	Role	Notes
2019	Coaster	Nina	Short film
2019	Ru's Angels	Himself	Short film
2022	Weird: The Al Yankovic Story	Divine	
2025	Queens of the Dead	Ginsey	

=== Television ===
Year	Title	Role	Notes	Ref
2019	RuPaul's Drag Race	Himself	Contestant (6th place)	
2019	RuPaul's Drag Race: Untucked	Himself	Contestant (6th place)	
2019	The View	Himself	Guest	
2020	RuPaul's Celebrity Drag Race	Himself	Mentor	
2021	RuPaul's Drag Race season 13	Himself	Guest	
2021	NewsBeat	Himself	Co-host	
2021	Blue's Clues & You!	Parade MC	(voice)	
2021	Dragging the Classics: The Brady Bunch	Alice Nelson		
2023	Drag Me to Dinner	Himself	Hulu original	
2024	RuPaul's Drag Race All Stars season 9	Contestant (4th Place)		
2026	The Muppet Show	Audience Member	Uncredited	

=== Theatre ===
Year	Title	Role	Theatre	Ref(s)
2021	Hairspray	Edna Turnblad	National Tour	

=== Music videos ===
Year	Title	Artist	Role	Ref
2019	"Scores"	Kahanna Montrese	Coach	
2019	"Hucks"	Himself	Sarah Sanders, Donald Trump	
2019	"Drag Is Magic"	Himself		
2019	"Treat Yourself"	Himself		
2019	"Lisa Frankenstein"	Himself		
2020	"Nerves of Steel"	Erasure	Himself	

=== Web series ===
Year	Title	Role	Ref.
2019	Whatcha Packin'	Himself	
2019	Queen to Queen	Himself	
2021	What's My Game?	Himself	
2021	Drag Queens React	Himself	
