= RuCo's Empire =

- RuPaul's Drag Race episode
- Episode no.: Season 8 Episode 3
- Presented by: RuPaul
- Original air date: March 21, 2016

Guest appearances
- Faith Evans; Tasha Smith

Episode chronology
← Previous "Bitch Perfect"	Next → "New Wave Queens"
- RuPaul's Drag Race season 8

"RuCo's Empire" is the third episode of the eighth season of the American television series RuPaul's Drag Race. It originally aired on March 21, 2016. The episode's main challenge tasks the contestants with acting in scenes inspired by the American television series Empire (2015). Faith Evans and Tasha Smith are guest judges. Bob the Drag Queen wins the main challenge. Cynthia Lee Fontaine is eliminated from the competition after placing in the bottom and losing a lip-sync contest against Robbie Turner to "Mesmerized" (2005) by Evans.

== Episode ==
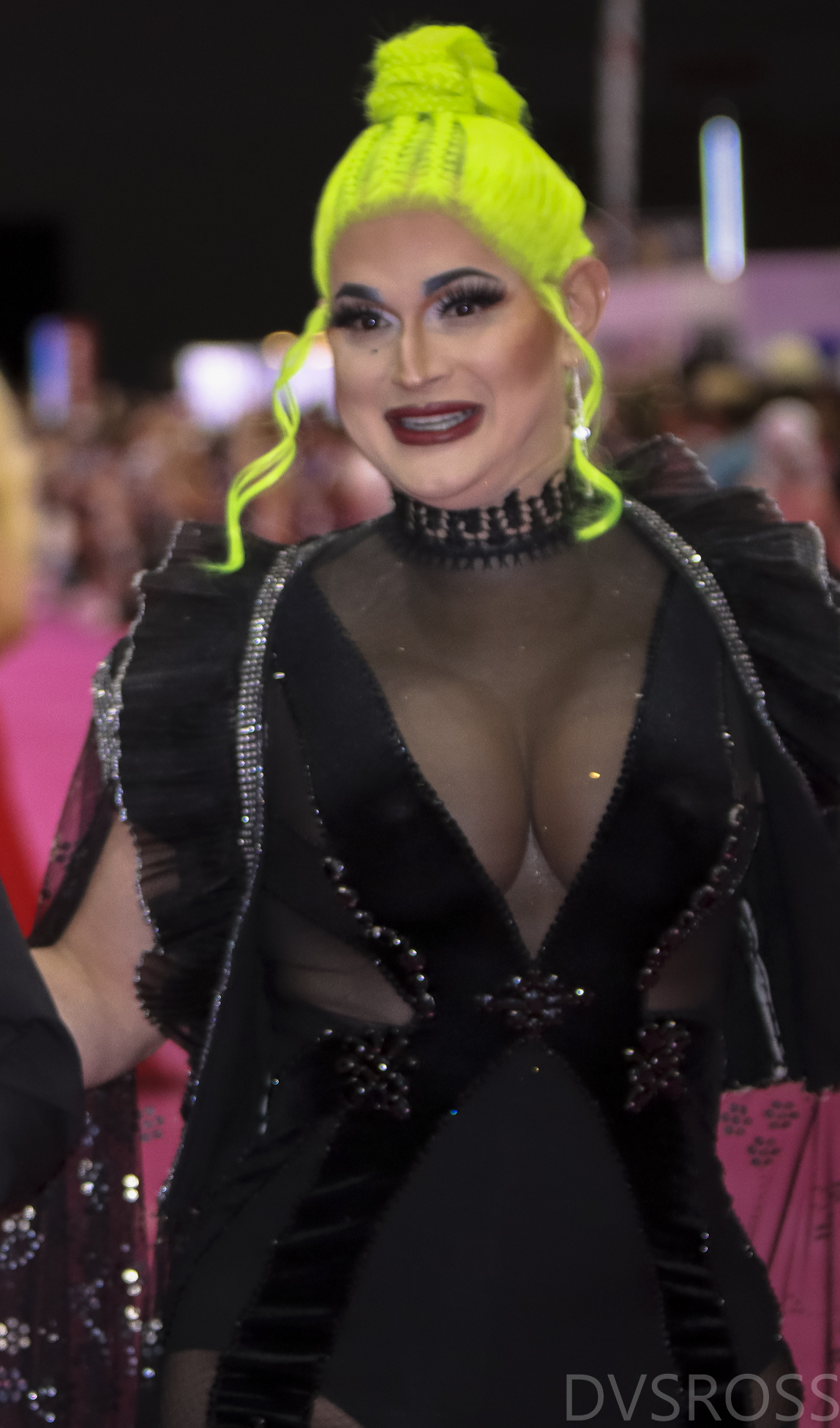
Cynthia Lee Fontaine (pictured in 2022) is eliminated from the competition.

The contestants return to the Werk Room after the elimination of both Dax ExclamationPoint and Laila McQueen on the previous episode. The group discuss who RuPaul may have invited back to the competition. On a new day, RuPaul greets the group and reveals the mini-challenge, which tasks the contestants with participating in a fashion show, with the runway category being "Supreme Court realness". The contestant must embellish and accessorize plain black robes. Naomi Smalls, who wore a look inspired by Sandra Day O'Connor, is declared the winner.

RuPaul invites Naysha Lopez back to the competition. RuPaul then reveals the main challenge, which tasks the contestants with performing in sketches inspired by the television series Empire. Naomi Smalls and Naysha Lopez are team captains as select their fellow team members. Naomi Smalls's team includes Bob the Drag Queen, Chi Chi DeVayne, Cynthia Lee Fontaine, and Robbie Turner. Naysha Lopez's team includes Acid Betty, Derrick Barry, Kim Chi, and Thorgy Thor. The teams select roles, rehearse, then film the scenes, which are co-directed by RuPaul and Faith Evans. On elimination day, the contestants make final preparations for the fashion show. Thorgy Thor talks about her mother's death and its lasting impact.

On the main stage, RuPaul welcomes fellow judges Michelle Visage and Carson Kressley, as well as guest judges Evans and Tasha Smith. RuPaul reveals the runway category ("Roller Girl Realness"), which tasks the contestants with presenting looks while wearing roller skates, then the fashion show commences. The contestants and judges watch the two scenes. The judges deliver their critiques, deliberate, then share the results with the group. Bob the Drag Queen is declared the winner of the main challenge. Cynthia Lee Fontaine and Robbie Turner place in the bottom and face off in a lip-sync contest to "Mesmerized" (2005) by Evans. Given the option of wearing high-heeled shoes or roller skates for the contest, Cynthia Lee Turner selects the former and Robbie Turner chooses the latter. Robbie Turner wins the lip-sync, eliminating Cynthia Lee Fontaine from the competition.

== Production and broadcast ==
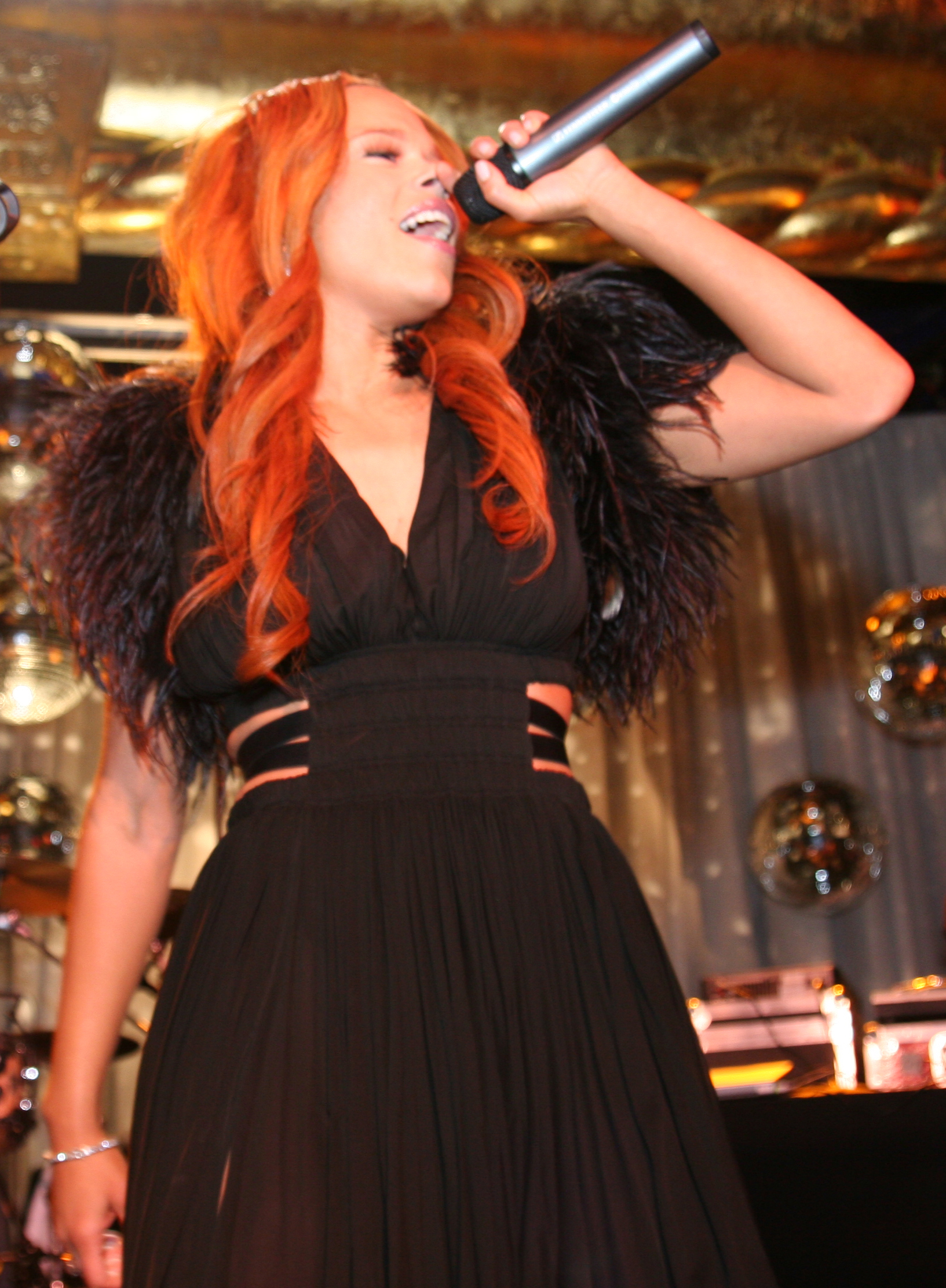
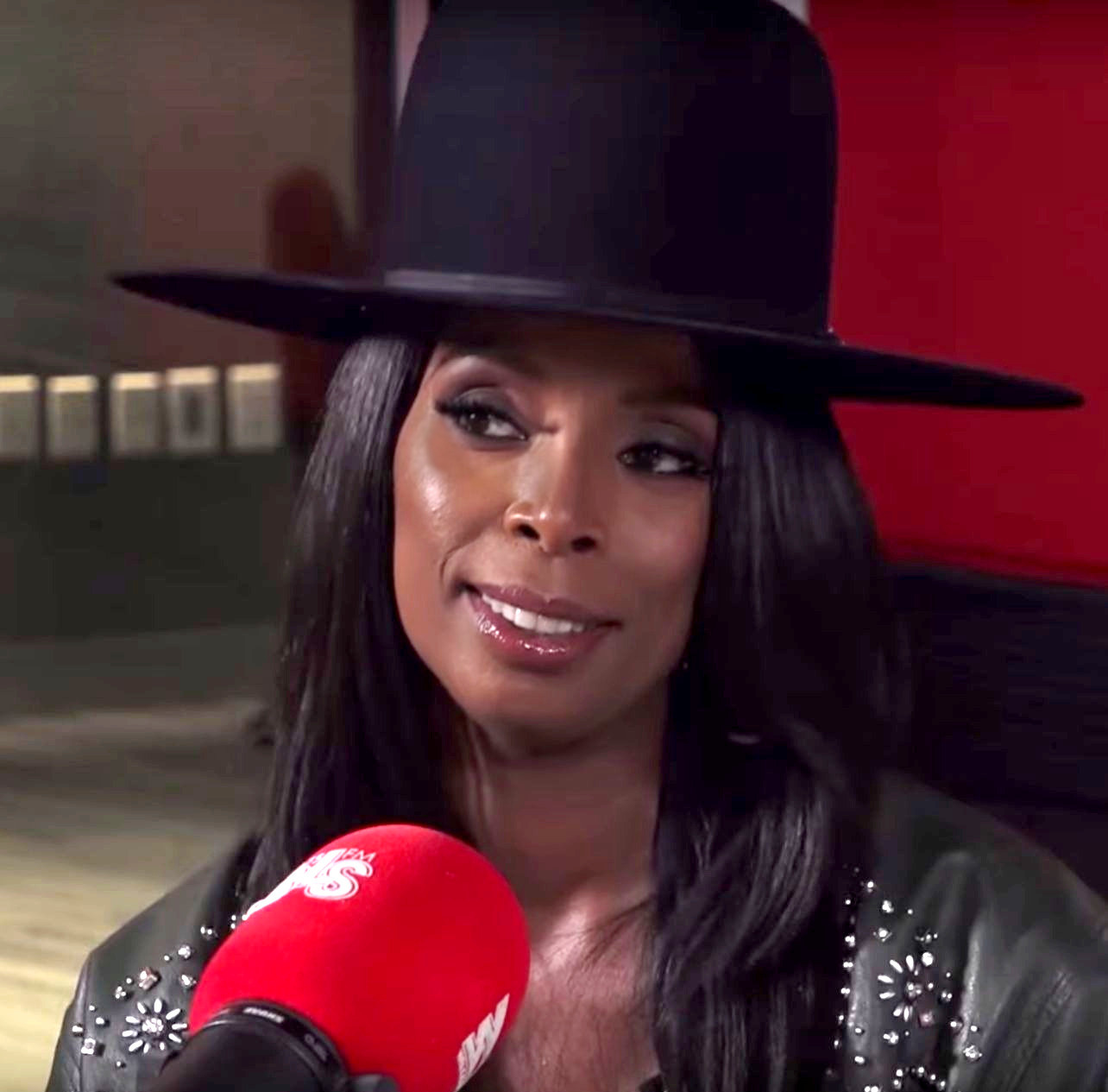
Faith Evans (top) and Tasha Smith (bottom) are guest judges on the episode.

The episode originally aired on March 21, 2016.

=== Fashion ===
For the fashion show, Naysha Lopz wears a short pink dress. Thorgy Thor wears blue shorts and a large blonde wig. Derrick Barry's dress is made of plastic. She wears a pink wig. Kim Chi has a colorful outfit with feathers. Acid Betty wears a black-and-red outfit with a large headpiece and mohawk hairstyle. Naomi Smalls has a pink outfit and a red wig. Bob the Drag Queen wears a silver robot-inspired outfit. Cynthia Lee Fontaine wears red shorts and tights, red accessories, white socks, a blonde wig, and a black cowboy hat. Chi Chi DeVayne wears a neon green outfit and an afro. Robbie Turner wears a denim jumpsuit with rhinestones, as well as a gold necklace, a red wig, and sunglasses.

== Reception ==
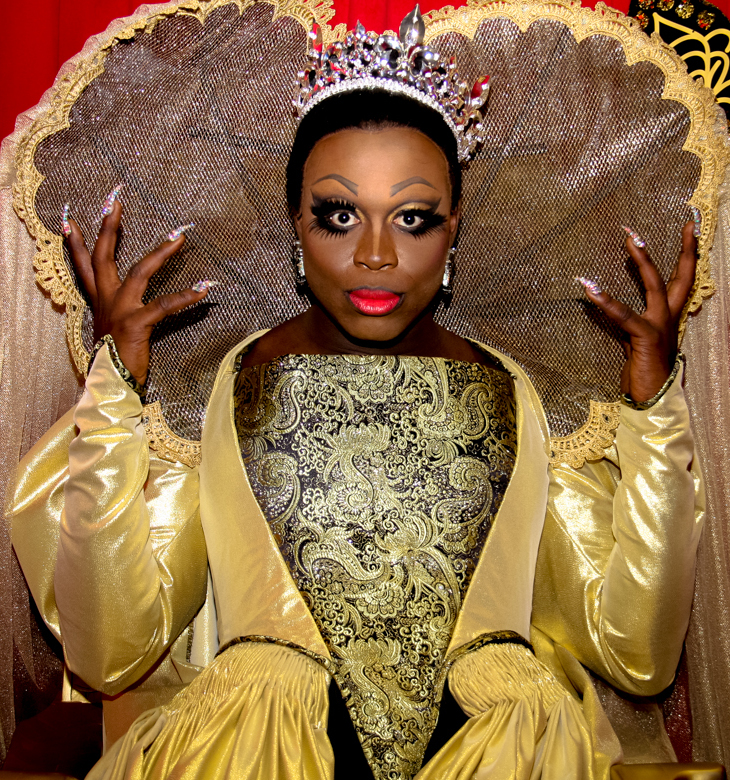
Bob the Drag Queen (pictured at RuPaul's DragCon LA in 2017) wins the main challenge.

Oliver Sava of The A.V. Club gave the episode a rating of 'C+'. In 2016, Michael Shirey of Gay City News said Bob the Drag Queen's performance was among her highlights of the season. The sketch was included in Screen Rant's 2022 list of the show's ten best acting challenges. Sam Damshenas selected "RuCo's Empire" for the eighth season in Gay Times's 2023 list of the best episodes from each season, writing:

Best frenemies Bob the Drag Queen and Thorgy Thor memorably went head-to-head in season eight's outrageous homage to Empire and Taraji P. Henson's career-defining role as the Fox's drama's queen bee Cookie Lyons. Bob eerily embodied how Cookie effortlessly breathes power as she tortured her teammates – including strong gay woooman Cynthia Lee Fontaine – and Thorgy's hunger to conquer over her NYC sister resulted in an equally ferocious yet menacing tribute. A worthy second runner-up, Kim Chi also deserves her flowers for her side-splitting performance as 'Vanilla Wafer' that simultaneously proved that she could serve comedy and glamour. RuCo's Empire: The Sequel, when?

Lily Pearson of The Independent included the "Mesmerized" performance in a 2018 list of the show's "most unmissable moments", writing: "If there's one thing that can make one of the show's legendary lip sync batters even better, it's a pair of roller skates and a Faith Evans belter." Kevin O'Keeffe ranked the contest number 91 in INTO Magazine's 2018 "definitive ranking" of the show's lip-sync contests to date. In 2019, IN Magazine included Robbie Turner's lip-sync performance in a list of six "Ru-veals that still have us gagged". The magazine's Bianca Guzzo wrote, "After the remaining queens slipped and slid through an entire runway done solely on roller skates, Robbie Turner shocked the fellow queens when they opted to keep the roller skates on to compete in the episode's lip sync. Robbie's moves were fast, calculated, and dare I say, choreographed for you know, rollerskates. I can't remember much about that episode, but I do remember the shock value of performing a whole number on wheels, and it was impressive." Sam Brooks ranked the contest number 95 in The Spinoff's 2019 "definitive ranking" of the show's 162 lip-syncs to date.
