= Grand Finale (RuPaul's Drag Race season 8) =

Episode of RuPaul's Drag Race

- RuPaul's Drag Race episode
- Episode no.: Season 8 Episode 10
- Presented by: RuPaul
- Original air date: May 16, 216
- Running time: 61 minutes

Episode chronology
← Previous "The Realness"	Next → "Oh. My. Gaga!"
- RuPaul's Drag Race season 8

"Grand Finale" is the tenth episode of the eighth season of the American television series RuPaul's Drag Race. Filmed at the Orpheum Theater in downtown Los Angeles, the episode originally aired on May 16, 2016. It sees the season's contestants reunite and the three finalists compete to win the competition. In addition to the season's contestants, former Drag Race winners make guest appearances and other former contestants Shangela and Gia Gunn ask questions from the audience. Among celebrities appearing in video messages are Carol Channing, Margaret Cho, Lena Headey, Nancy Grace, and Jennifer Holliday. Bob the Drag Queen is crowned the season's winner, making Kim Chi and Naomi Smalls the runners-up.

== Episode ==
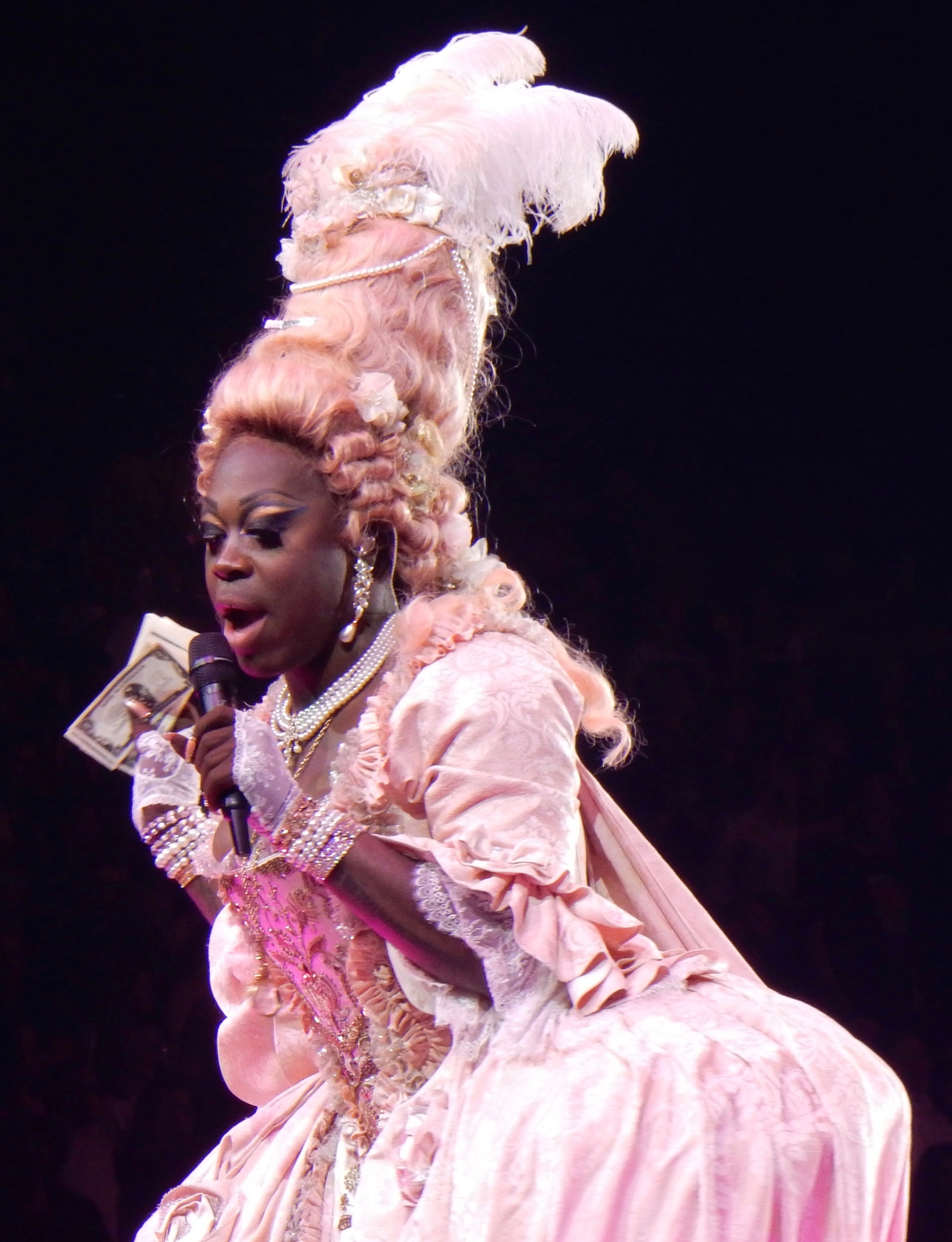
Bob the Drag Queen in 2023

The episode starts with RuPaul and former Drag Race winners on the main stage in front of a live audience. RuPaul uses Raja's phone to bring a clown out onto the stage (referencing a photo shoot at the start of the season). All of the season's contestants return for the live grand finale. Dax ExclamationPoint, Laila McQueen, Cynthia Lee Fontaine, Naysha Lopez, Acid Betty, Robbie Turner, Thorgy Thor, Derrick Barry, and Chi Chi DeVayne enter the stage, then are followed by the three finalists Bob the Drag Queen, Kim Chi, and Naomi Smalls. RuPaul returns to the main stage and welcomes fellow judges Michelle Visage, Carson Kressley, and Ross Mathews.

RuPaul explains how a winner will be determined. The finalists perform to original songs and have discussions with RuPaul and the judges. Video montages and messages from family members and celebrity guests are also shown. The finalists also answer questions from members of the Pit Crew and former contestants Shangela and Gia Gunn. Bob the Drag Queen, Kim Chi, and Naomi Smalls perform to "I Don't Like to Show Off", "Fat, Fem & Asian", and "Legs", respectively. Bob the Drag Queen receives a video message from Carol Channing. Kim Chi receives a message from Margaret Cho, who impersonates Kim Jong Il. Naomi Smalls receives a message from Lena Headey. RuPaul also interviews the season's other contestants. Acid Betty and Chi Chi DeVayne receive video messages from Nancy Grace and Jennifer Holliday, respectively.

RuPaul invites Katya, the reigning Miss Congeniality, to announce this season's title holder. Cynthia Lee Fontaine is named Miss Congeniality. The three finalists join RuPaul on the stage, then former Drag Race winners (BeBe Zahara Benet, Tyra Sanchez, Raja, Sharon Needles, Chad Michaels, Jinkx Monsoon, Bianca Del Rio, and Violet Chachki) walk the runway. Bob the Drag Queen is declared the winner, making Kim Chi and Naomi Smalls the runners-up.

== Production and broadcast ==
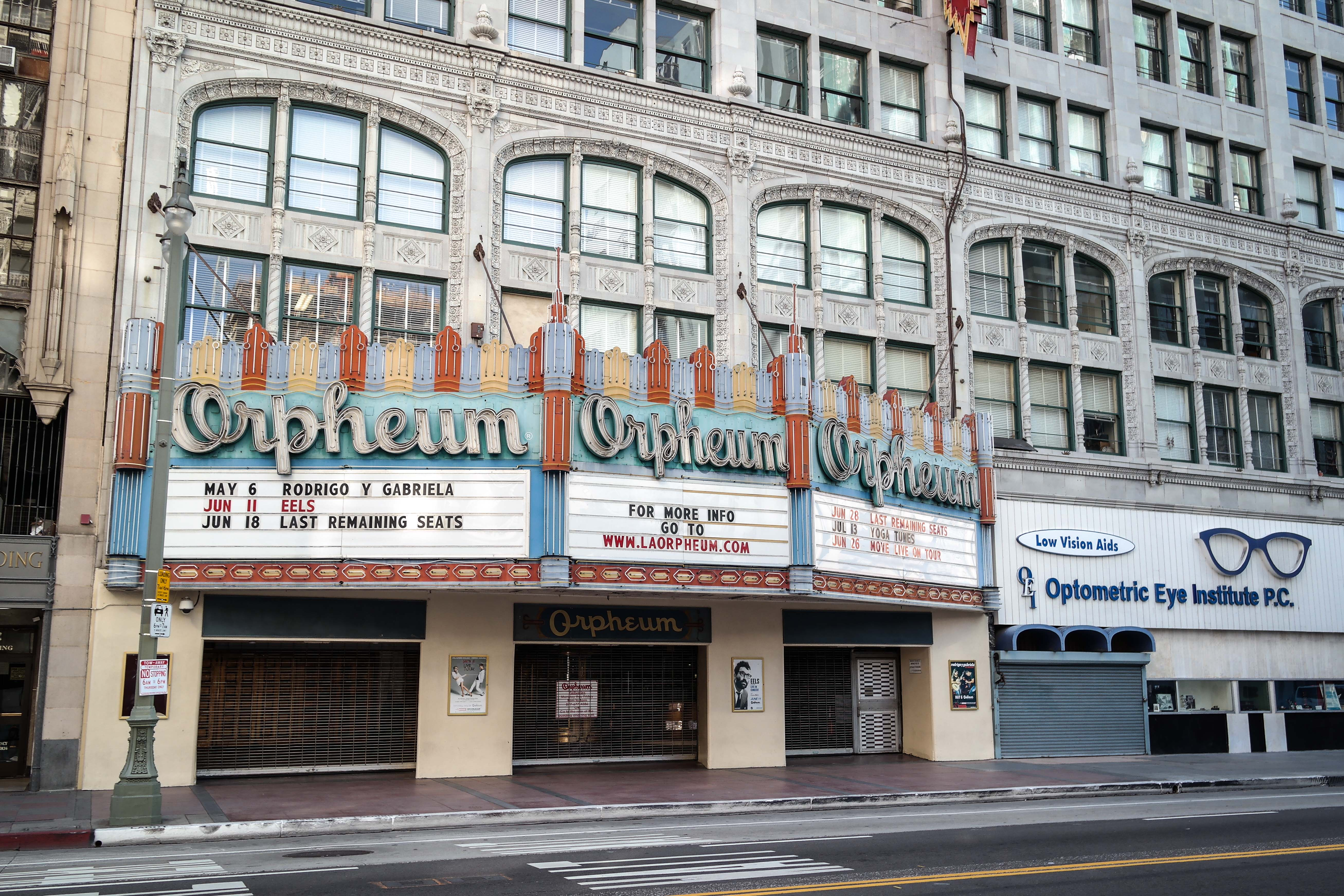
The episode was filmed at the Orpheum Theatre (exterior pictured in 2014) in Los Angeles, California.

The episode originally aired on May 16, 2016. It was filmed at the Orpheum Theater in downtown Los Angeles. Among former contestants in the live audience are Alaska, Manila Luzon, Max, and Stacy Layne Matthews.

Them magazine described "Fat, Fem & Asian" as "a play on a discriminatory message that used to be commonly found on gay hookup apps". Some of the songs lyrics were Korean. In "Legs", Naomi Smalls sings about how long her legs are.

=== Fashion ===
During her "Legs" performance, Naomi Smalls wears a dress with a hood, which she removes to show a more revealing outfit underneath.

== Reception and legacy ==
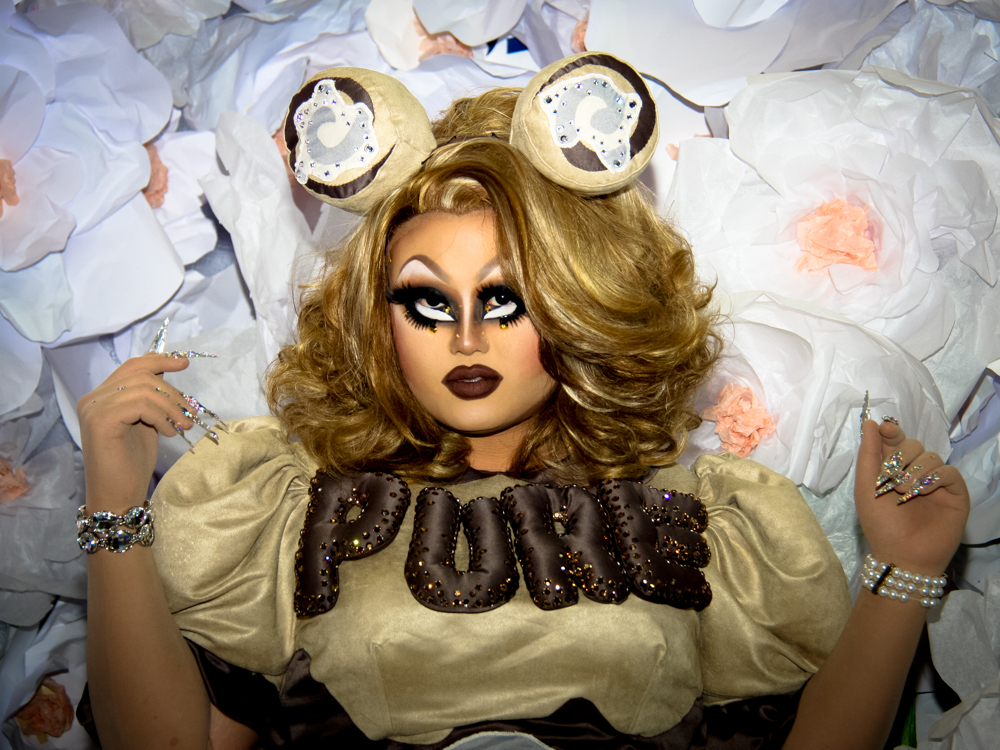
Kim Chi (pictured at RuPaul's DragCon LA in 2017) received praise for her original song performance.

Oliver Sava of The A.V. Club gave the episode a rating of 'B+'. Brian Moylan of Vulture rated the episode five out of five stars. Bernardo Sim included all three original songs in Pride.com's 2023 list of the show's ten best original songs. Sim called Bob the Drag Queen's song "hilarious" and said Naomi Smalls "proved that she was so much more than what some fans were giving her credit for". He also said of Kim Chi's performance: "When she performed 'Fat, Fem & Asian' at the grand finale, not only were we gagged by the spectacle of it all, but also by the subversive message in the song that felt so empowering." Writing for Out magazine in 2025, Sim said Kim Chi's song "addressed desirability politics in a fun/cheeky way".

In 2024, James Factora of Them said "Fat, Fem & Asian" was "instantly iconic". Kim Chi later released T-shirts with the text "Yas fats / Yas fems / Yas Azns", with proceeds benefitting the Los Angeles LGBT Center, Proud2Share, and Shape Up America. In The Fashion Studies Journal, Erique Zhang wrote, "By proudly proclaiming herself 'Fat, Fem & Asian' both on television and online, Kim Chi used her media visibility to transform these stigmatized characteristics into things to be celebrated."
