= New Wave Queens =

- RuPaul's Drag Race episode
- Episode no.: Season 8 Episode 4
- Presented by: RuPaul
- Original air date: March 28, 2016

Guest appearances
- Chris Stein; Debbie Harry; Lucian Piane

Episode chronology
← Previous "RuCo's Empire"	Next → "Supermodel Snatch Game"
- RuPaul's Drag Race season 8

"New Wave Queens" is the fourth episode of the eighth season of the American television series RuPaul's Drag Race. It originally aired on March 28, 2016. The episode's main challenge tasks the contestants with performing in new wave groups. Debbie Harry, Chris Stein, and Lucian Piane are guest judges. Robbie Turner wins the main challenge. Naysha Lopez is eliminated from the competition after placing in the bottom and losing a lip-sync contest against Chi Chi DeVayne to "Call Me" (1980) by Blondie.

== Episode ==
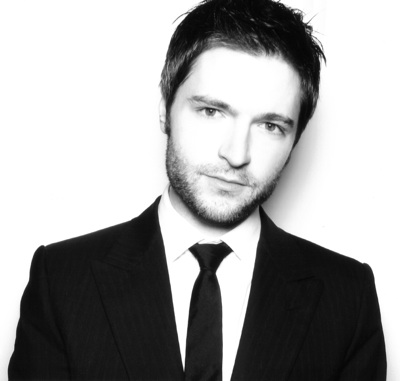
American composer and music producer Lucian Piane is a guest judge and rehearses with the contestants.

The contestants return to the workroom after Cynthia Lee Fontaine's elimination on the previous episode. On a new day, RuPaul greets the group and reveals the main challenge, which tasks the contestants with performing in new wave groups of three. The contestants must write original lyrics and create concepts for a live performance. Following are the self-selected music themes and team members:

- Art ("Street Meatz"): Acid Betty, Bob the Drag Queen, and Thorgy Thor
- Punk ("Les Chicken Wigs"): Kim Chi, Naomi Smalls, and Robbie Turner
- Synth ("Dragometry"): Chi Chi DeVayne, Derrick Barry, and Naysha Lopez

The contestants break into group and start to brainstorm. Chi Chi DeVayne distances herself from her fellow team members and worries more about what to wear for the performance. Each group rehearses with Lucian Piane. While making final preparations in the Werk Room for the performances and fashion show, Chi Chi DeVayne talks about her financial struggles.

On the main stage, RuPaul welcomes fellow judge Michelle Visage, as well as guest judges Debbie Harry, Chris Stein, and Piane. The three group perform for the judges. RuPaul reveals the runway category ("Neon Queen Realness"), then the fashion show commences. After the contestants present their looks, Robbie Turner is declared the winner of the main challenge. The judges deliver their critiques, deliberate, then share the results with the group. Acid Betty, Bob the Drag Queen, Derrick Barry, and Thorgy Thor are deemed safe. Chi Chi DeVayne and Naysha Lopez place in the bottom and face off in a lip-sync contest to "Call Me" (1980) by Blondie. Chi Chi DeVayne wins the lip-sync and Naysha Lopez is eliminated from the competition.

== Production and broadcast ==
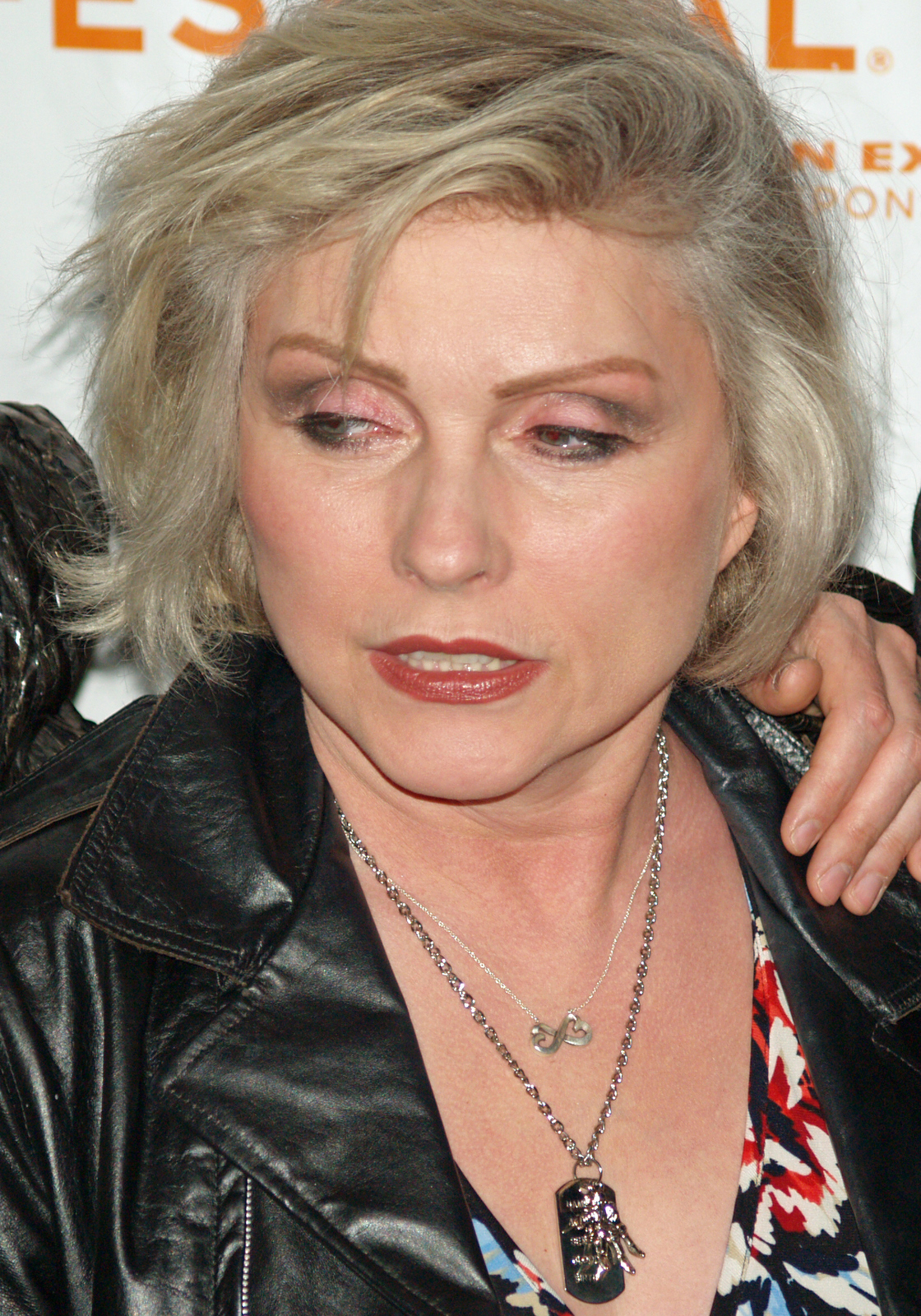
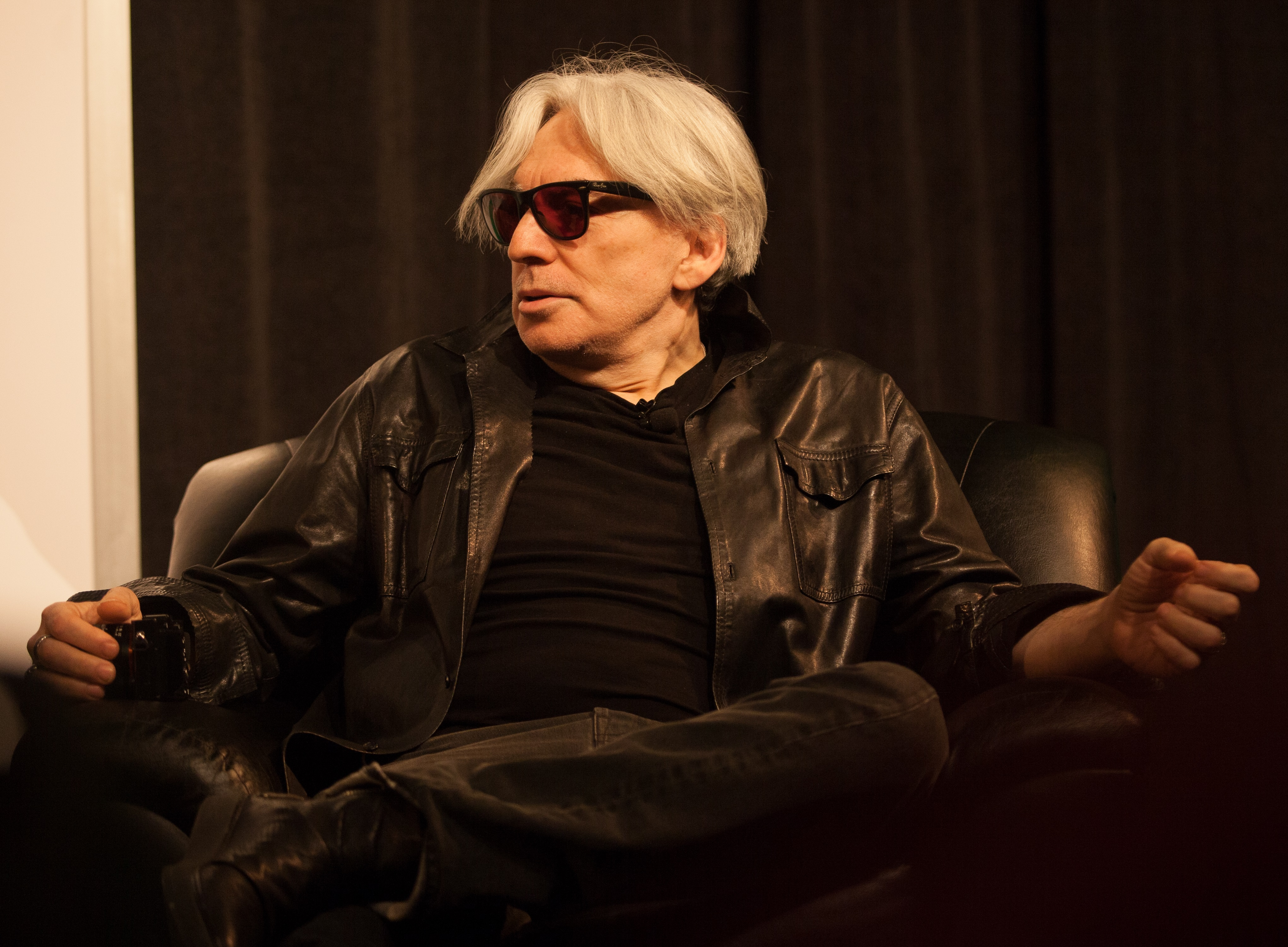
Debbie Harry (top, pictured in 2008) and Chris Stein (bottom, pictured in 2014) of Blondie are also guest judges.

The episode originally aired on March 28, 2016.

=== Fashion ===
For "Dragometry", Chi Chi DeVayne wears a rectangle, Derrick Barry wears a square, and Naysha Lopez wears a circle. For "Les Chicken Wigs", Robbie Turner's outfit has an animal print. She wears a blonde wig. Kim Chi and Naomi Smalls wear black outfits and red wigs. For the fashion show, Chi Chi DeVayne wears a black-and-pink outfit with tall black boots. Noami Small and Robbin Turner have a pink-and-yellow outfits. Bob the Drag Queen's outfit is black and yellow. Thorgy Thor has a large bright wig.

== Reception ==
Oliver Sava of The A.V. Club gave the episode a rating of 'B'. Out gave "New Wave Queens" a rating of 'B+'. Brian Moylan of Vulture rated the episode four out of five stars.

Jezebel said both contestants "were pulling off roundhouses like the Olympic gymnast team" during the lip-sync contest. Queerspace Magazine said of the lip-sync: "Chi Chi and Naysha painted the stage hot pink and chartreuse with acrobatic flips and death drops—one might argue too many. Naysha cartwheeled so much that her wig actually flew off, but Chi Chi’s on-point gymnastics in thigh-high patent leather stilettos granted her a sharper edge compared to Naysha’s barefoot performance." Joe Reid of Decider wrote: "Naysha Lopez didn’t bother to do much practicing with Blondie’s 'Call Me,' so sure was she that she would not end up in the bottom two. Oops! Funny thing about that: not only did she have to Lip Sync for Her Life, but all the backflips and lost wigs couldn’t help her beat Chi Chi. Naysha doesn’t seem all that broken up about it afterwards, so I guess that thing where she was eliminated three weeks ago just deadened her emotions. Girl, bye."

In 2020, following the death of Chi Chi DeVayne, Sam Damshenas of Gay Times said of her "Call Me" performance: "With just one lip-sync, Chi Chi cemented herself as one of the fiercest lip-sync assassins in HERstory... Chi Chi served flips, kicks, splits and resembled a Mortal Kombat character with a plethora of other tricks, securing one more week in the competition." IN Magazine said of the contest: "Chi Chi brought it with flips, death drops, and a passionate lip sync. It sent Naysha home for the second time and set Chi Chi up to be one of Ru's top lip sync assassins in the show's herstory."
