= Bitch Perfect =

- RuPaul's Drag Race episode
- Episode no.: Season 8 Episode 2
- Presented by: RuPaul
- Original air date: March 14, 2016

Guest appearances
- Ester Dean (guest judge); Lucian Piane (guest judge); AB Soto; Jamal Sims

Episode chronology
← Previous "Keeping It 100!"	Next → "RuCo's Empire"
- RuPaul's Drag Race season 8

"Bitch Perfect" is the second episode of the eighth season of the American television series RuPaul's Drag Race. It originally aired on March 14, 2016. The episode's main challenge tasks the contestants with performing choreography in a sketch inspired by Pitch Perfect. Ester Dean, Lucian Piane, and Jamal Sims are guest judges. Chi Chi DeVayne wins the main challenge. Dax ExclamationPoint and Laila McQueen place in the bottom and are both eliminated from the competition after a lip-sync contest to "I Will Survive" by Gloria Gaynor.

== Episode ==
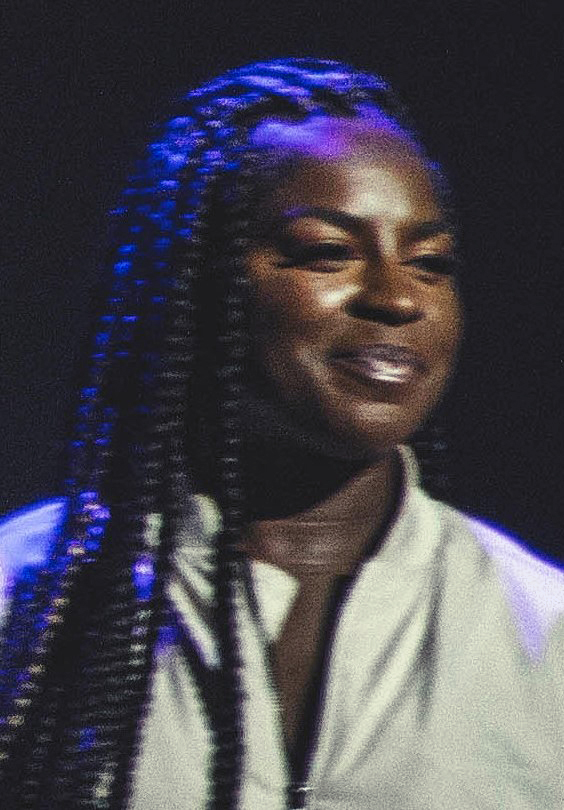
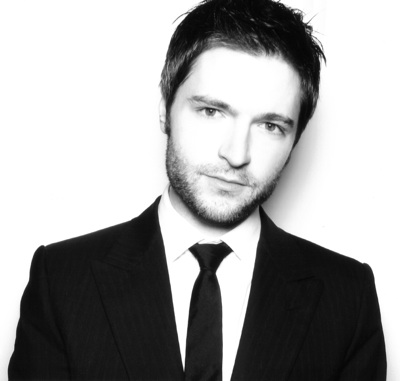
Ester Dean (left, pictured in 2017) and Lucian Piane (right, pictured in 2009) are guest judges.

The contestants return to the Werk Room after Naysha Lopez's elimination on the previous episode. On a new day, RuPaul greets the group and reveals the mini-challenge, which tasks the contestants with getting into "quick drag" and participating in a Latin-style dance circle to music by AB Soto featuring RuPaul ("Cha Cha Bitch"), wearing outfits from the thrift store Out of the Closet. AB Soto joins to be a guest judge for the mini-challenge. Chi Chi DeVayne and Cynthia Lee Fontaine are declared the winners.

AB Soto leaves, then RuPaul then reveals the main challenge, which tasks the contestants with performing choreography in a Pitch Perfect-inspired sketch Bitch Perfect. The two winners of the mini-challenge select their teammates. The two groups (Team "Lady Bitches" and Team "Shady Bitches") begin to rehearse. RuPaul returns to the Werk Werk Room and meets with each group to ask questions and offer advice. RuPaul invites any interested contestants to use the confessional room called the Shade Tree. On the main stage, the contestants rehearse with guest choreographer Jamal Sims.

On elimination day, the contestants make final preparations for the sketch and the fashion show. Kim Chi and Dax ExclamationPoint talk about their weight losses. Kim Chi reveals to the group that she is a virgin. Chi Chi DeVayne talks about her upbringing and experience with gangs. On the main stage, RuPaul welcomes fellow judge Michelle Visage, as well as guest judges Ester Dean, Lucian Piane, and Sims. The contestants perform in Bitch Perfect. RuPaul reveals the runway category ("Movie Premiere Realness"), then the fashion show commences. The judges deliver their critiques, deliberate, then share the results with the group. Chi Chi DeVayne is declared the winner of the main challenge. Dax ExclamationPoint and Laila McQueen place in the bottom and face off in a lip-sync contest to "I Will Survive" (1978) by Gloria Gaynor. Both contestants are eliminated from the competition. Both return to the Werk Room to leave mirror messages for the remaining contestants. Back on the main stage, RuPaul is shown calling someone to ask if they are available.

== Production and broadcast ==
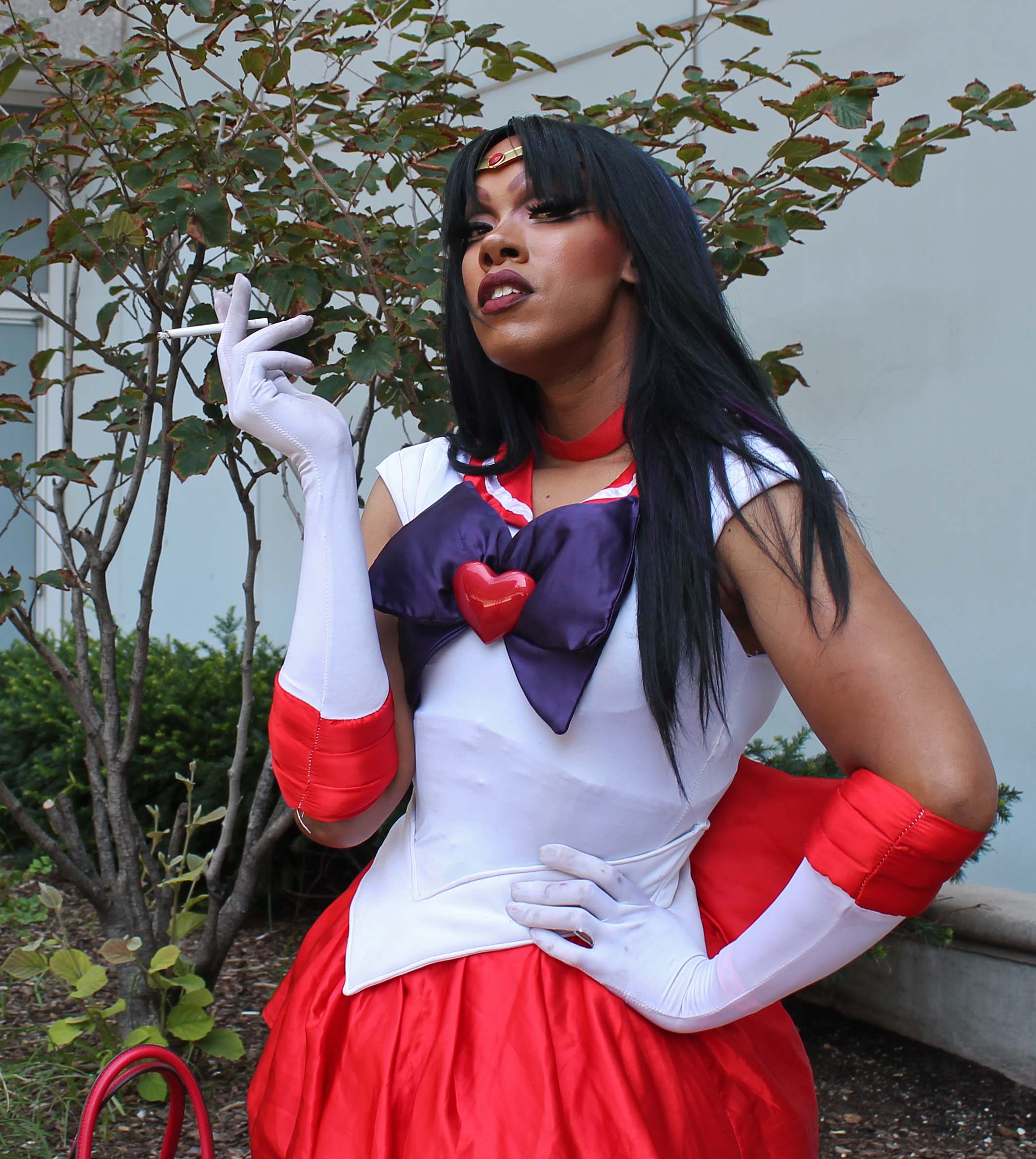
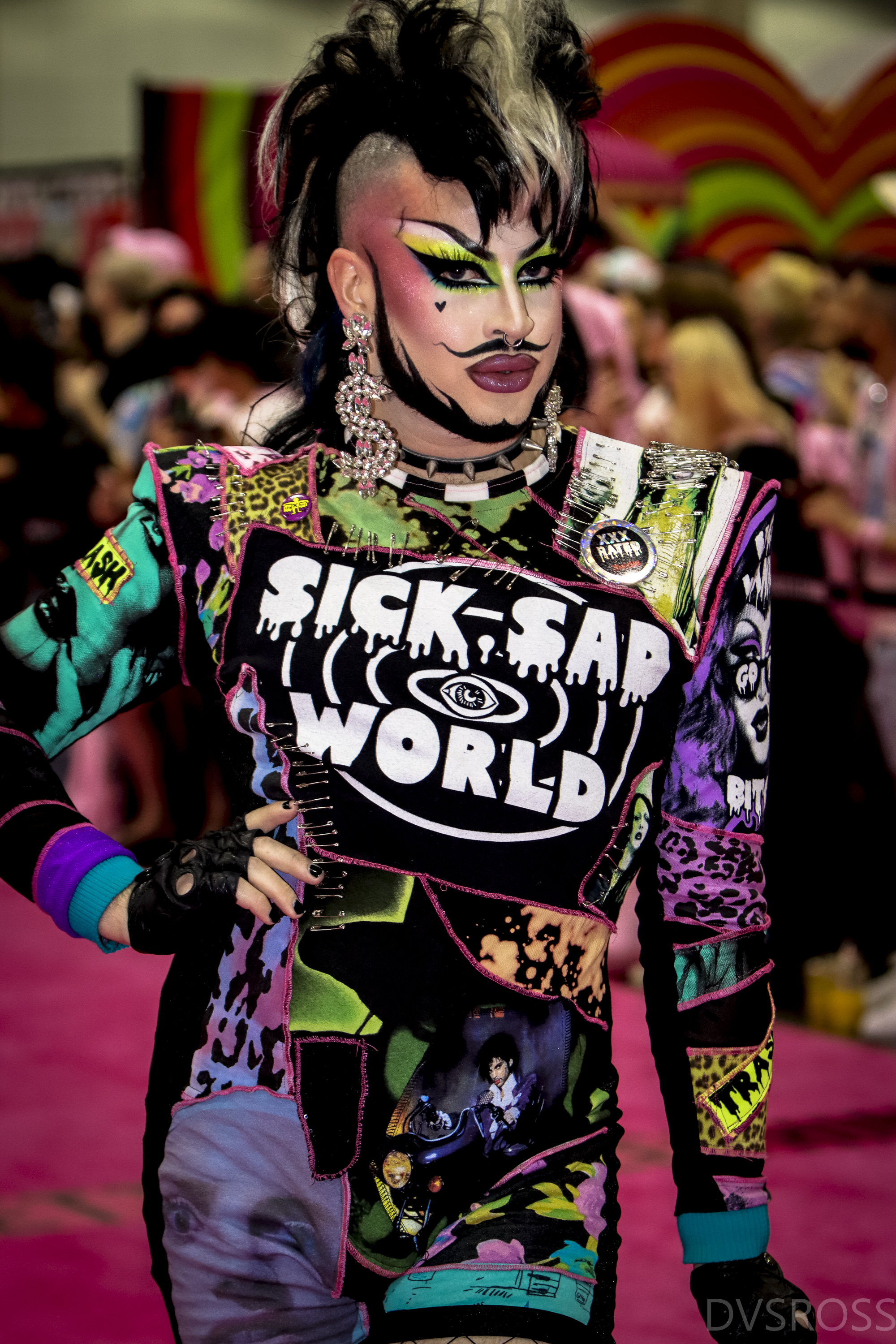
Dax ExclamationPoint (top, pictured in 2016) and Laila McQueen (bottom, pictured at RuPaul's DragCon LA in 2022) are both eliminated from the competition.

The episode originally aired on March 14, 2016. AB Soto is a guest judge for the mini-challenge. Dax ExclamationPoint said she was "hurt" from being eliminated. The double elimination was the second in the show's history. There has not been one since, as of season 17 (2025).

Bitch Perfect references various RuPaul songs, including "Jealous of My Boogie", "Geronimo", "Superstar", and "Adrenaline".

=== Fashion ===
For the fashion show, Cynthia Lee Fontaine wears a long dress. Bob the Drag Queen has a long black gown and an afro. Derrick Barry has a short dress and a large red wig. Laila McQueen's sequined dress and wig are green. Robbie Turner's red dress is inspired by a Vera Wang wedding dress. Kim Chi's floral outfit is pink and her wig is blonde. Chi Chi DeVayne wears a long red dress. Naomi Smalls has a long black dress with tall black boots and a short wig. Acid Betty wears a black-and-nude outfit, a black headpiece, and a pink wig. Dax ExclamationPoint's dress is gold and green. She wears a large flower in her wig. Thorgy Thor has a sequined jumpsuit and a large wig.

== Reception ==
Oliver Sava of The A.V. Club gave the episode a rating of 'A-'. Stephen Daw ranked Bitch Perfect eighth in Billboard's 2024 list of the show's Rusicals to date.

Buffy Flores ranked the "I Will Survive" performance fifth in Pride.com's 2016 list of the show's seven worst lip-sync contests to date, writing: "So much could have gone right with a song like this, but it all ended up so wrong." Kevin O'Keeffe ranked "I Will Survive" number 73 in INTO Magazine's 2018 "definitive ranking" of the show's lip-syncs to date. In 2019, Visage said "I Will Survive" is her least favorite of the show's lip-syncs. Sam Brooks ranked the contest last (number 162) in The Spinoff's 2019 "definitive ranking" of the show's 162 lip-syncs to date, writing: "I mean, there's kind of no question here as to what lip-sync is the worst in the show's history. It's the one where they sent two queens home for barely knowing how to perform 'I Will Survive', a song that is so emotionally legible and universal that a toddler with the barest conception of life or death could do a passable run at it." Writers for Vulture called the lip-sync performance "poor" in 2019. In 2023, Michelle Konopka Alonzo of Screen Rant wrote, "While Dax's performance was lackluster and uninspiring, Laila's lip-sync was slightly better until she made a fatal mistake. As soon as Laila took her dress off, the look on RuPaul's face immediately indicated that neither Laila nor Dax would be saved; in hindsight, there's little doubt that Laila would've stayed if she had kept her clothes on."
