= Supermodel Snatch Game =

- RuPaul's Drag Race episode
- Episode no.: Season 8 Episode 5
- Original air date: April 4, 2016

Guest appearances
- Chanel Iman (guest judge); Gigi Hadid (guest judge); Charo

Episode chronology
← Previous "New Wave Queens"	Next → "Wizards of Drag"
- RuPaul's Drag Race season 8

"Supermodel Snatch Game" is the fifth episode of the eighth season of the American television series RuPaul's Drag Race. It originally aired on April 4, 2016. The episode's main challenge tasks the contestants with impersonating celebrities during the Snatch Game. American models Gigi Hadid and Chanel Iman are guest judges. Spanish actress and singer Charo also makes a guest appearance.

Bob the Drag Queen wins the challenge. Acid Betty is eliminated from the competition after placing in the bottom and losing a lip-sync contest against Naomi Smalls to "Causing a Commotion" by Madonna.

== Episode ==
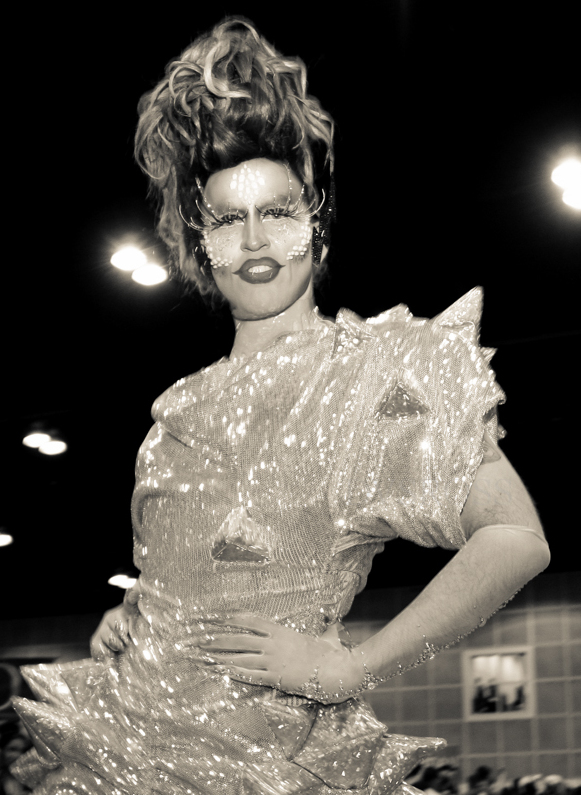
Acid Betty is eliminated from the competition.

The contestants return to the workroom after Naysha Lopez's elimination on the previous episode. Bob the Drag Queen and Derrick Barry get into an argument. On a new day, RuPaul greets the group and reveals the main challenge, which tasks the contestants with impersonating celebrities in the Snatch Game. The contestants start to prepare for the game. RuPaul returns to the workroom to meet with each contestant, asking questions and offering advice. Before leaving, RuPaul shares the runway category ("Night of a Hundred Madonna's").

The Snatch Game commences with Gigi Hadid and Chanel Iman as celebrity guests. Following are the contestants and impersonated celebrities:

- Acid Betty as Nancy Grace
- Bob the Drag Queen as Uzo Aduba (as Crazy Eyes from Orange is the New Black) and Carol Channing
- Chi Chi DeVayne as Eartha Kitt
- Derrick Barry as Britney Spears
- Kim Chi as Kimmy Jong-Un (Kim Jong-Un's sister, a fictional character created by Kim Chi)
- Naomi Smalls as Tiffany Pollard
- Robbie Turner as Diana Vreeland
- Thorgy Thor as Michael Jackson

RuPaul declares Charo, who makes a guest appearance, the winner of Snatch Game. On elimination day, the contestants make final preparations for the fashion show. Acid Betty talks about being left out of Brooklyn's drag community. Thorgy Thor shares about her classical music career and shares about wanting to conduct a full symphony in drag. Naomi Smalls talks about her large family and being adopted.

On the main stage, RuPaul welcomes fellow judges Michelle Visage and Carson Kressley, as well as guest judges Hadid and Iman. RuPaul shares the assignment of the main challenge and the runway theme, then the fashion show commences. The judges deliver their critiques, deliberate, and share the results with the contestants. Bob the Drag Queen wins the challenge. Acid Betty and Naomi Smalls place in the bottom and face off in a lip-sync contest to "Causing a Commotion" (1987) by Madonna. Naomi Smalls wins the lip-sync and Acid Betty is eliminated from the competition.

== Production and broadcast ==
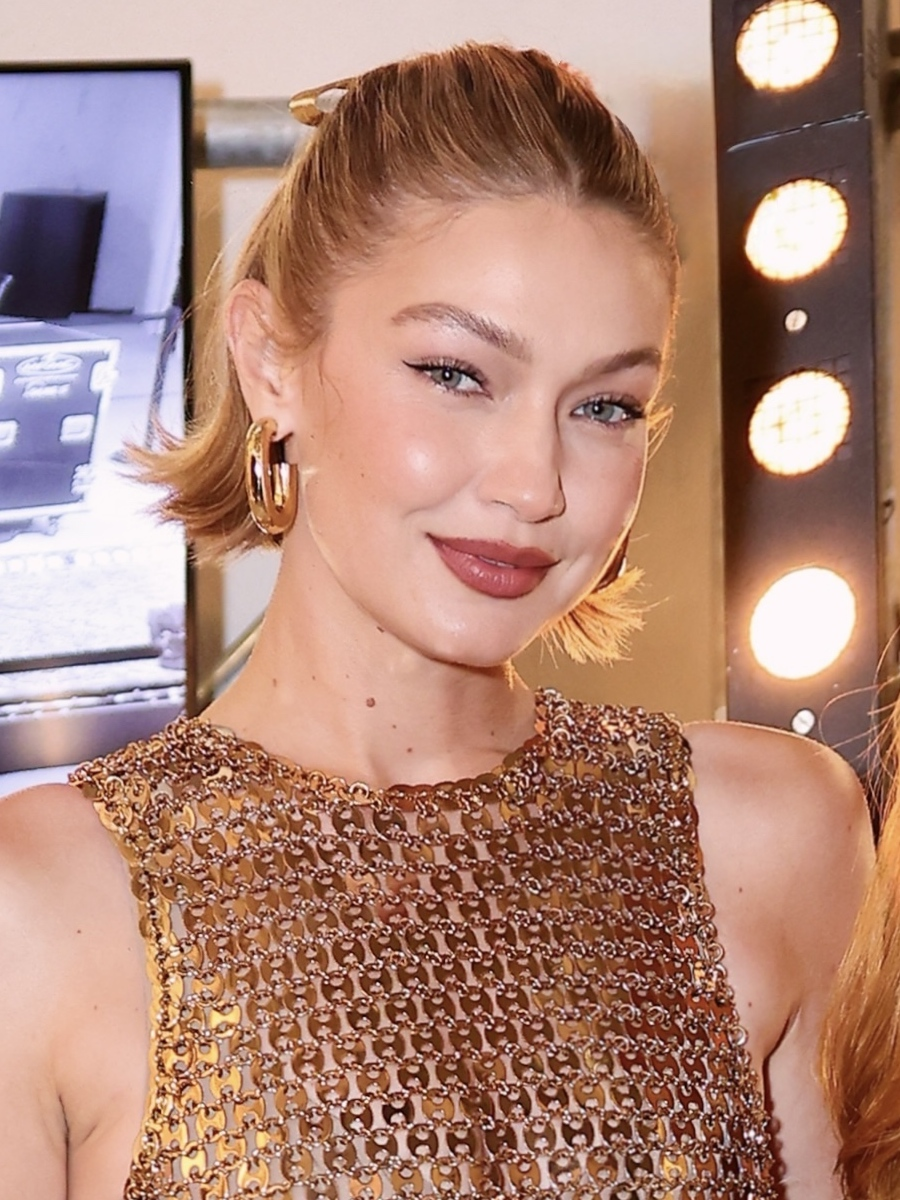
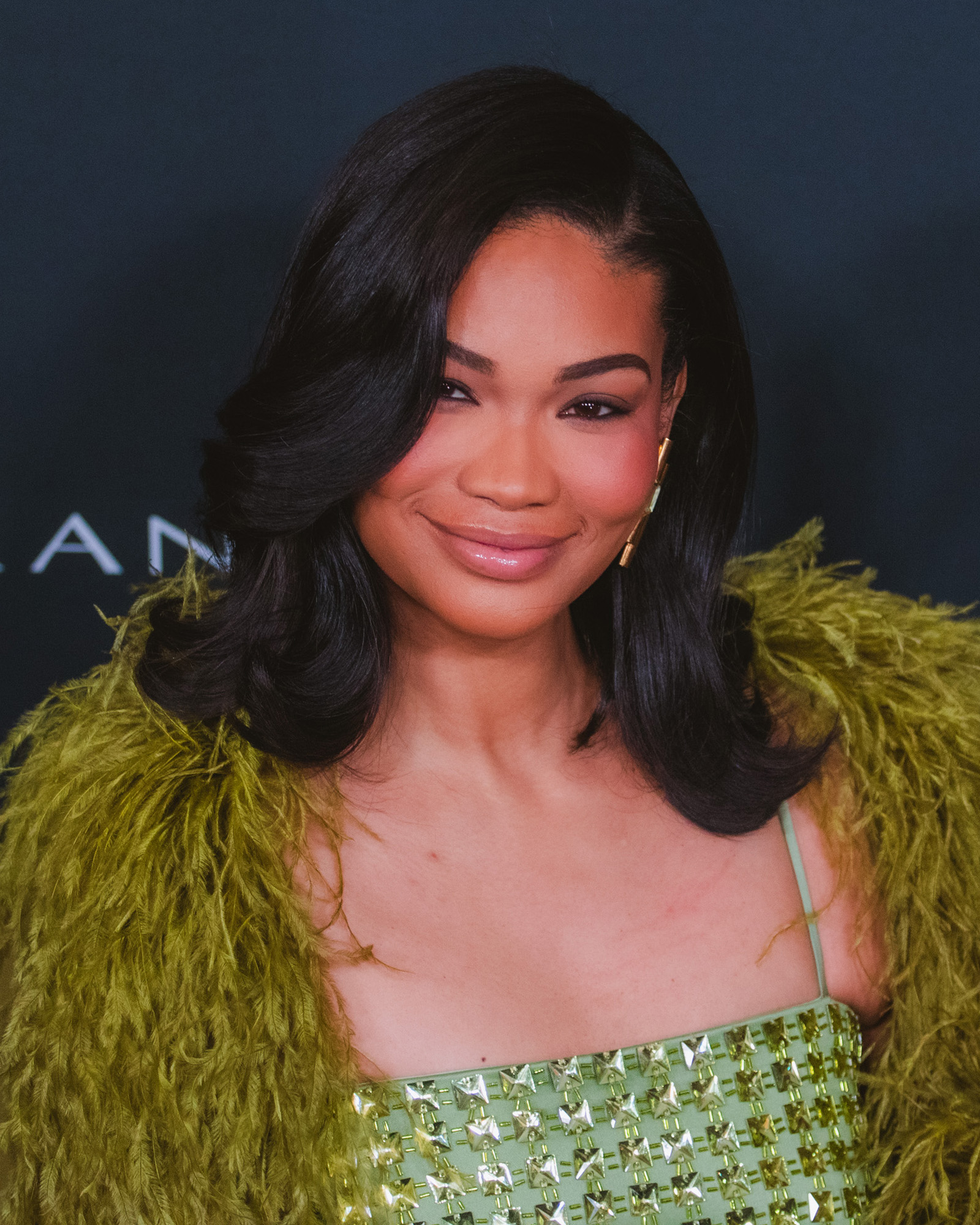
Gigi Hadid (left, pictured in 2025) and Chanel Iman (right, pictured in 2026) are guest judges.

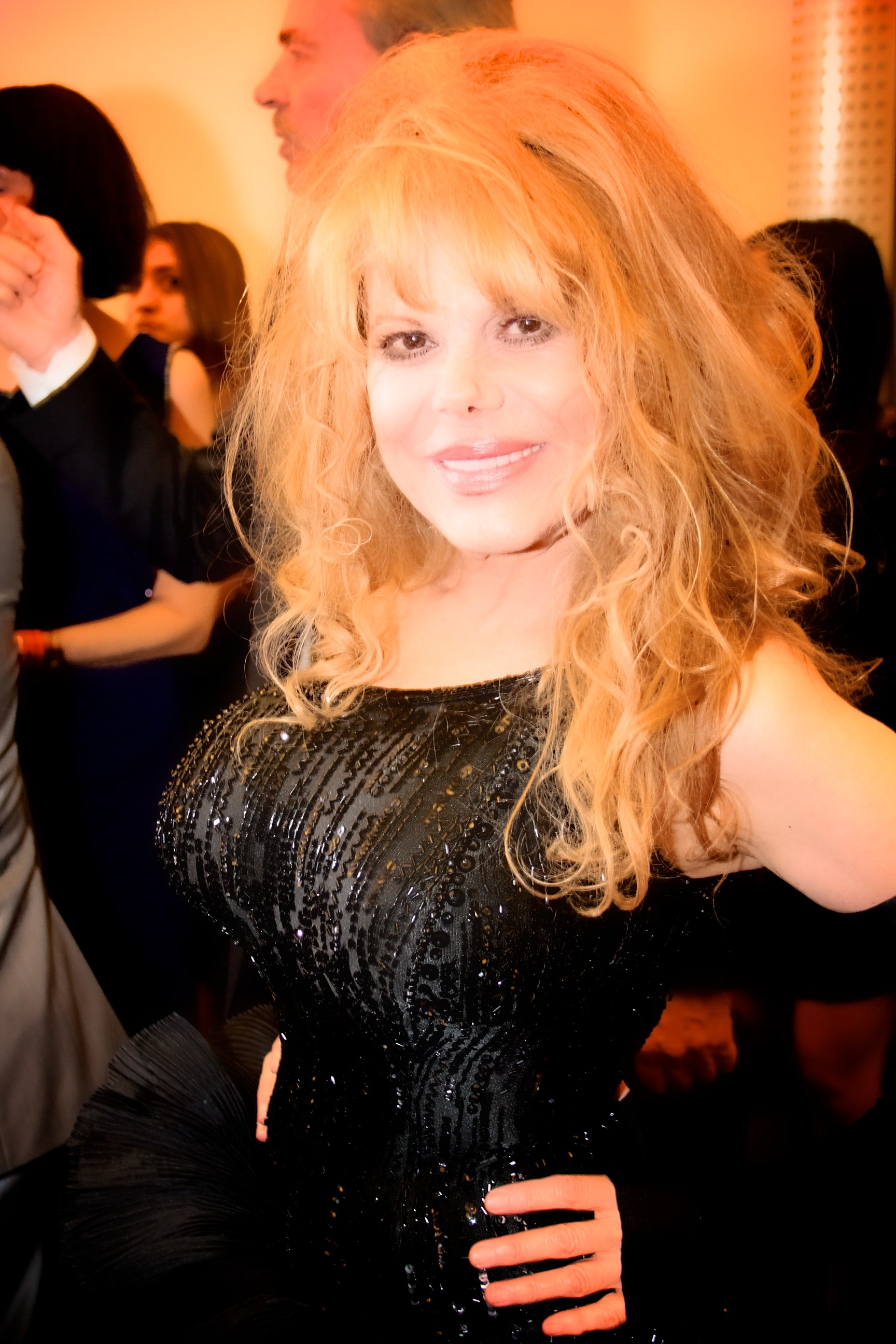
Charo (pictured in 2013) also makes a guest appearance.

The episode originally aired on April 4, 2016.

The number of kimonos shown is referenced in the ninth season's Snatch Game where the runway category is the same, with RuPaul calling it "KimoNo She Betta Don't!"

=== Fashion ===
Hadid wears jeans inside-out.

Several contestants wear kimonos for the fashion show. Thorgy Thor, Derrick Barry, and Naomi Smalls present kimono looks based on the "Nothing Really Matters" music video. Thorgy Thor's outfit is black and red and she has a dark wig. Derrick Berry has a black and white outfit and a dark wig. Naomi Smalls has a red outfit with matching high-heeled shoes and a dark wig. Kim Chi wears a red-and-white kimono one based on the "Paradise (Not for Me)" music video. Acid Betty's look is based on the "Bedtime Story" music video. She has a white outfit with multiple doves attached and a blonde wig. Robbie Turner's look is based on A League of Their Own. She wears a baseball-inspired pink dress with a red hat. Chi Chi DeVayne's outfit is based on the Blond Ambition Tour. She has a black corset and a silver cone bra. Bob the Drag Queen's blue scout-inspired outfit is based on Madonna's 2013 GLAAD Media Awards red carpet look.

== Reception ==
Oliver Sava of The A.V. Club gave the episode a rating of 'B-'. Min Ji Park included Hadid and Iman in Screen Rant's 2022 list of the show's ten worst judges, according to Reddit, writing: "While these two judges did nothing wrong per se, they definitely didn’t come out looking favorably. The two were the judges of the always memorable snatch game episode, which already puts them at a disadvantage in terms of expectations... While the two were not overly mean to the queens, they were simply too unprepared for the stakes of a monumental episode such as Snatch Game, especially one that had one of the weirdest Snatch Game performances." The website's Kara Morrison also included Hadid and Iman in a 2022 list of the show's ten worst celebrity guest judges.

== See also ==
- Cultural impact of Britney Spears
- Cultural impact of Madonna
- Cultural impact of Michael Jackson
