= RuPaul's Drag Race season 8 =

2016 season of RuPaul's Drag Race

RuPaul's Drag Race
- Season 8
- Promotional poster for season eight
- Hosted by: RuPaul
- Judges: RuPaul; Michelle Visage; Carson Kressley; Ross Mathews
- No. of contestants: 12
- Winner: Bob the Drag Queen
- Runners-up: Kim Chi; Naomi Smalls
- Miss Congeniality: Cynthia Lee Fontaine
- Companion show: RuPaul's Drag Race: Untucked!
- No. of episodes: 10

Release
- Original network: Logo TV
- Original release: March 7 – May 16, 2016

Season chronology
- ← Previous; Season 7 Next → Season 9

The eighth season of RuPaul's Drag Race began airing on March 7, 2016. Returning judges include RuPaul and Michelle Visage, along with Ross Mathews and Carson Kressley, who shared judging responsibilities on an alternating basis. Twelve drag queens competed for the title of "America's Next Drag Superstar". The prizes for the winner are a one-year supply of Anastasia Beverly Hills cosmetics and a cash prize of $100,000. The full list of contestants was revealed during the NewNowNext Awards on February 1, 2016. The song "U Wear It Well" from RuPaul's album Butch Queen was featured in promotion for the show. On March 31, 2016, it was announced LogoTV renewed the show for a ninth season. It was the last season to solely be played on Logo, as the show moved to VH1 for its ninth season.

The theme song played during the runway segment every episode was "The Realness", and the song played during the closing credits was "Die Tomorrow", both songs from the album Realness.

The winner of the eighth season of RuPaul's Drag Race was Bob the Drag Queen, with Kim Chi and Naomi Smalls being the runners-up, and Cynthia Lee Fontaine being crowned season 8's Miss Congeniality.

On August 20, 2020, Chi Chi DeVayne died after battling scleroderma and pneumonia.

== Contestants ==
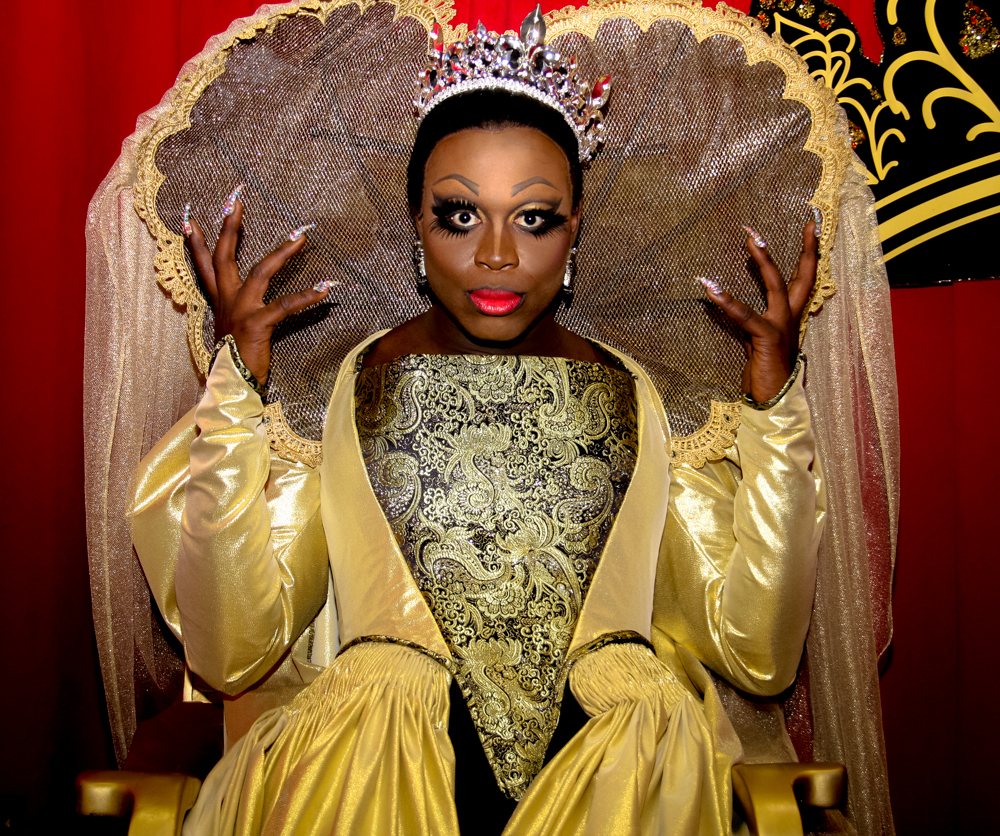
The winner, Bob the Drag Queen

Ages, names, and cities stated are at time of filming.

Contestants of RuPaul's Drag Race season 8 and their backgrounds
Contestant	Age	Hometown	Outcome
Bob the Drag Queen	29	New York City, New York	Winner
Kim Chi	27	Chicago, Illinois	Runners-up
Naomi Smalls	21	Redlands, California	Runners-up
Chi Chi DeVayne (Note: Chi Chi Kat DeVayne is referred to as Chi Chi DeVayne on the show.)	29	Shreveport, Louisiana	4th place
Derrick Barry	32	Las Vegas, Nevada	5th place
Thorgy Thor	31	New York City, New York	6th place
Robbie Turner	33	Seattle, Washington	7th place
Acid Betty	38	New York City, New York	8th place
Naysha Lopez	31	Chicago, Illinois	9th place (Note: Naysha Lopez originally placed twelfth before re-entering the competition.)
Cynthia Lee Fontaine	34	Austin, Texas	10th place (Note: Cynthia Lee Fontaine was voted Miss Congeniality by the viewers.)
Dax ExclamationPoint	31	Savannah, Georgia	11th place
Laila McQueen	22	Gloucester, Massachusetts	11th place

== Contestant progress ==
Legend:

Bob the Drag Queen won RuPaul's Drag Race season 8.
Kim Chi and Naomi Smalls were the runners-up.
Cynthia Lee Fontaine was voted Miss Congeniality (Miss C) by the viewers.
WIN indicates that the contestant won the challenge.
SAFE indicates that the contestant was declared safe by the judges.
BTM (Bottom) indicates that the contestant was up for elimination.
ELIM (Eliminated) indicates that the contestant was eliminated.
Guest indicates that the contestant returned as a guest.

Progress of contestants including placements in each episode
Contestant	Episode									
Contestant	1	2	3	4	5	6	7	8	9	10
Bob the Drag Queen	SAFE	SAFE	WIN	SAFE	WIN	SAFE	WIN	BTM	SAFE	Winner
Kim Chi	WIN	SAFE	SAFE	SAFE	SAFE	SAFE	SAFE	WIN	SAFE	Runner-up
Naomi Smalls	SAFE	SAFE	SAFE	SAFE	BTM	WIN	SAFE	SAFE	SAFE	Runner-up
Chi Chi DeVayne	SAFE	WIN	SAFE	BTM	SAFE	SAFE	BTM	SAFE	ELIM	Guest
Derrick Barry	SAFE	SAFE	SAFE	SAFE	SAFE	BTM	WIN	ELIM		Guest
Thorgy Thor	SAFE	SAFE	SAFE	SAFE	SAFE	SAFE	ELIM			Guest
Robbie Turner	SAFE	SAFE	BTM	WIN	SAFE	ELIM				Guest
Acid Betty	SAFE	SAFE	SAFE	SAFE	ELIM					Guest
Naysha Lopez	ELIM		SAFE	ELIM						Guest
Cynthia Lee Fontaine	SAFE	SAFE	ELIM							Miss C
Dax ExclamationPoint	SAFE	ELIM								Guest
Laila McQueen	BTM	ELIM								Guest

== Lip syncs ==
Legend:

The contestant was eliminated after their first time in the bottom.
The contestant was eliminated after their second time in the bottom.
The contestant was eliminated after the lip sync to qualify for the finale.

Episode	Contestants			Song	Eliminated
1	Laila McQueen	vs.	Naysha Lopez	"Applause" (Lady Gaga)	Naysha Lopez
2	Dax ExclamationPoint	vs.	Laila McQueen	"I Will Survive" (Gloria Gaynor)	Dax ExclamationPoint
2	Dax ExclamationPoint	vs.	Laila McQueen	"I Will Survive" (Gloria Gaynor)	Laila McQueen
3	Cynthia Lee Fontaine	vs.	Robbie Turner	"Mesmerized (Freemasons Radio Edit)" (Faith Evans)	Cynthia Lee Fontaine
4	Chi Chi DeVayne	vs.	Naysha Lopez	"Call Me" (Blondie)	Naysha Lopez
5	Acid Betty	vs.	Naomi Smalls	"Causing a Commotion" (Madonna)	Acid Betty
6	Derrick Barry	vs.	Robbie Turner	"I Love It" (Icona Pop ft. Charli XCX)	Robbie Turner
7	Chi Chi DeVayne	vs.	Thorgy Thor	"And I Am Telling You I'm Not Going" (Jennifer Holliday)	Thorgy Thor
8	Bob the Drag Queen	vs.	Derrick Barry	"You Make Me Feel (Mighty Real)" (Sylvester)	Derrick Barry
9	Bob the Drag Queen vs. Chi Chi DeVayne vs. Kim Chi vs. Naomi Smalls			"The Realness" (RuPaul)	Chi Chi DeVayne

== Guest judges ==
Listed in chronological order:

- Nicole Richie, television personality
- Ester Dean, singer/songwriter
- Jamal Sims, choreographer
- Lucian Piane, music producer
- Faith Evans, singer
- Tasha Smith, actress and comedian
- Chris Stein, musician
- Debbie Harry, singer
- Chanel Iman, model
- Gigi Hadid, model
- Marc Jacobs, fashion designer
- Todrick Hall, singer and internet personality
- Thomas Roberts, journalist
- Vivica A. Fox, actress
- Amy Sedaris, comedian and actress
- David Sedaris, writer

=== Special guests ===
Guests who appeared in episodes, but did not judge on the main stage.

Episode 1

- BeBe Zahara Benet, winner of season 1
- Tyra Sanchez, winner of season 2
- Raja, winner of season 3
- Sharon Needles, winner of season 4
- Chad Michaels, runner-up of season 4 and winner of All Stars season 1
- Jinkx Monsoon, winner of season 5
- Violet Chachki, winner of season 7
- Shannel, contestant on season 1 and All Stars season 1
- Latrice Royale, contestant and Miss Congeniality of season 4 and contestant on All Stars season 1
- Raven, runner-up of season 2 and All Stars season 1
- Morgan McMichaels, contestant on season 2

Episode 2

- AB Soto, musician

Episode 4

- The Vivienne, RuPaul's Drag Race UK Ambassador

Episode 5

- Charo, musician and comedian

Episode 6

- Marc Snetiker, Entertainment Weekly journalist
- Cast of Little Women: LA

Episode 7

- Andrew Christian, fashion designer

Episode 9

- Jayson Whitmore, director
- Bianca Del Rio, winner of season 6

Episode 10

- BeBe Zahara Benet, winner of season 1
- Tyra Sanchez, winner of season 2
- Raja, winner of season 3
- Sharon Needles, winner of season 4
- Chad Michaels, runner-up of season 4 and winner of All Stars season 1
- Jinkx Monsoon, winner of season 5
- Bianca Del Rio, winner of season 6
- Violet Chachki, winner of season 7
- Shangela, contestant on season 2 and season 3
- Carol Channing, actress and comedian (via video message)
- Trixie Mattel, contestant on season 7
- Margaret Cho, comedian and actress (via video message)
- Lena Headey, actress (via video message)
- Gia Gunn, contestant on season 6
- Nancy Grace, legal commentator and television journalist (via video message)
- Jennifer Holliday, singer and actress (via video message)
- Katya, contestant and Miss Congeniality on season 7

== Episodes ==
No. overall	No. in season	Title	Original release date
94	1	"Keeping It 100!"	March 7, 2016
Twelve new queens enter the workroom. For the first mini-challenge, the queens do a photoshoot with past winners. Robbie Turner wins the mini-challenge. For the main challenge, the queens create an outfit based on a design challenge from a past season.: Acid Betty: Make Dat Money from Season 3 Episode 13; Bob the Drag Queen: Gone with the Window from Season 2 Episode 1; Chi Chi DeVayne: The Glitter Ball from Season 6 Episode 11; Cynthia Lee Fontaine: The Sugar Ball from Season 5 Episode 11; Dax ExclamationPoint: The Hello Kitty Ball from Season 7 Episode 11; Derrick Barry: The Queen Who Mopped Xmas from Season 3 Episode 2; Kim Chi: The Hair Ball from Season 3 Episode 11; Laila McQueen: RuPocalypse Now! from Season 4 Episode 1; Naomi Smalls: Float Your Boat from Season 4 Episode 6; Naysha Lopez: Drag on a Dime from Season 1 Episode 1; Robbie Turner: The Bitch Ball from Season 4 Episode 11; Thorgy Thor: Face, Face, Face of Cakes from Season 3 Episode 7; On the runway, Acid Betty, Derrick Barry and Kim Chi receive positive critiques, with Kim Chi winning the challenge. Laila McQueen, Naomi Smalls, Naysha Lopez and Robbie Turner receive negative critiques, with Naomi Smalls and Robbie Turner being safe. Laila McQueen and Naysha Lopez lip-sync to "Applause" by Lady Gaga. Laila McQueen wins the lip-sync and Naysha Lopez is the first queen to sashay away.: Guest Judge: Nicole Richie; Alternating Judge(s): Carson Kressley and Ross Mathews; Mini-Challenge: Photoshoot with past winners; Mini-Challenge Winner: Robbie Turner; Main Challenge: Create an outfit based on a design challenge from a past season; Challenge Winner: Kim Chi; Challenge Prize: A $3,000 cash tip from selfieonastick.com; Bottom Two: Laila McQueen and Naysha Lopez; Lip-Sync Song: "Applause" by Lady Gaga; Eliminated: Naysha Lopez; Farewell Message: "Dear Ladies + Monsters. It was a pleasure meeting you all! Play the cards you are dealt + Turn DA PARTY! P.S. I ❤️ U Layla [sic] xoxo! The Beauty! Naysha Lopez ❤️"
95	2	"Bitch Perfect"	March 14, 2016
For this week's mini-challenge, the queens have a Latin dance-off to "Cha Cha Bitch". Chi Chi DeVayne and Cynthia Lee Fontaine win the mini-challenge. For the main challenge, the queens team up and perform in a collegiate a capella sing-off called "Bitch Perfect".: Team Lady Bitches: Bob The Drag Queen, Cynthia Lee Fontaine, Derrick Barry, Kim Chi, Laila McQueen and Robbie Turner; Team Shady Bitches: Acid Betty, Chi Chi DeVayne, Dax ExclamationPoint, Naomi Smalls and Thorgy Thor; On the runway, category is Movie Premiere Realness. Acid Betty, Chi Chi DeVayne and Thorgy Thor receive positive critiques, with Chi Chi DeVayne winning the challenge. Dax ExclamationPoint, Kim Chi and Laila McQueen receive negative critiques, with Kim Chi being safe. Dax ExclamationPoint and Laila McQueen lip-sync to "I Will Survive" by Gloria Gaynor. After the lip-sync, RuPaul decides to eliminate both Dax ExclamationPoint and Laila McQueen from the competition. At the end of the episode, RuPaul calls a queen to join the competition.: Guest Judges: Ester Dean, Lucian Piane, and Jamal Sims; Mini-Challenge: Latin dance-off to "Cha Cha Bitch"; Mini-Challenge Winners: Chi Chi DeVayne and Cynthia Lee Fontaine; Main Challenge: In team's perform in a collegiate a cappella sing-off called "Bitch Perfect"; Runway Theme: Movie Premiere Realness; Challenge Winner: Chi Chi DeVayne; Challenge Prize: A 4 night getaway to a bed and breakfast in New England; Bottom Two: Dax ExclamationPoint and Laila McQueen; Lip-Sync Song: "I Will Survive" by Gloria Gaynor; Eliminated: Dax ExclamationPoint and Laila McQueen; Dax ExclamationPoint's Farewell Message: "Ladies, You're all Fantastic! I wish I could be here with you! Set the world on fire + Make Everyone EAT IT -DAX! ☠"; Laila McQueen's Farewell Message: "You're All the Biggest Pack of freaks and I am so "Happy" to call you "family". But Actually I ❤️ you All & can't wait for the future with you! xoxo Laila! PS. 1 less Madonna"
96	3	"RuCo's Empire"	March 21, 2016
For this week's mini-challenge, the queens drag up a supreme court judge robe. Naomi Smalls wins the mini-challenge. RuPaul then announces that Naysha Lopez will be returning to the competition. For the main challenge, the queens team up and star in two Empire-inspired acting scenes.: Team Naomi Smalls: Bob the Drag Queen, Chi Chi DeVayne, Cynthia Lee Fontaine, Naomi Smalls and Robbie Turner; Team Naysha Lopez: Acid Betty, Derrick Barry, Kim Chi, Naysha Lopez and Thorgy Thor; On the runway, category is Roller Girl Realness. Acid Betty, Bob the Drag Queen and Thorgy Thor receive positive critiques, with Bob the Drag Queen winning the challenge. Cynthia Lee Fontaine, Derrick Barry and Robbie Turner receive negative critiques, with Derrick Barry being safe. Cynthia Lee Fontaine and Robbie Turner lip-sync to "Mesmerized (Freemasons Radio Edit)" by Faith Evans. Robbie Turner wins the lip-sync and Cynthia Lee Fontaine sashays away.: Guest Judges: Faith Evans and Tasha Smith; Alternating Judge: Carson Kressley; Mini-Challenge: Drag up a supreme court judge robe; Mini-Challenge Winner: Naomi Smalls; Returned: Naysha Lopez; Main Challenge: In teams, star in two Empire-inspired acting scenes; Runway Theme: Roller Girl Realness; Challenge Winner: Bob the Drag Queen; Challenge Prize: $3,500 of Innovative Eyewear from Bradley Kenneth; Bottom Two: Cynthia Lee Fontaine and Robbie Turner; Lip-Sync Song: "Mesmerized (Freemasons Radio Edit)" by Faith Evans; Eliminated: Cynthia Lee Fontaine; Farewell Message: "Dont give up!!! Fight For Your Dreams!!! Love you Mis Amores #CuCu <(:3"
97	4	"New Wave Queens"	March 28, 2016
For this week's main challenge, the queens write, record, and perform verses in ‘80s style New Wave girl bands.: Team Dragometry: Chi Chi DeVayne, Derrick Barry and Naysha Lopez; Team Les Chicken Wings: Kim Chi, Naomi Smalls and Robbie Turner; Team Street Meatz: Acid Betty, Bob the Drag Queen and Thorgy Thor; On the runway, category is Neon Queen Realness. Team Les Chicken Wings is the winning team, with Robbie Turner winning the challenge. Team Dragometry and Team Street Meatz are the losing teams. Chi Chi DeVayne, Derrick Barry and Naysha Lopez receive negative critiques, with Derrick Barry being safe. Chi Chi DeVayne and Naysha Lopez lip-sync to "Call Me" by Blondie. Chi Chi DeVayne wins the lip-sync and Naysha Lopez sashays away.: Guest Judges: Debbie Harry, Chris Stein, and Lucian Piane; Main Challenge: Write, record, and perform verses in ‘80s style New Wave girl bands; Runway Theme: Neon Queen Realness; Challenge Winner: Robbie Turner; Challenge Prize: A wig wardrobe from Weaven Steven; Bottom Two: Chi Chi DeVayne and Naysha Lopez; Lip-Sync Song: "Call Me" by Blondie; Eliminated: Naysha Lopez; Farewell Message: "Dear Ladies, Have a good time and push yourself. I got a 2nd chance, don't blow your first and only! xoxo Da Beauty! Naysha Lopez"
98	5	"Supermodel Snatch Game"	April 4, 2016
For this week's main challenge, the queens play the Snatch Game. Gigi Hadid and Chanel Iman star as the celebrity contestants. The cast consisted of: Acid Betty as Nancy Grace; Bob the Drag Queen as Uzo Aduba and Carol Channing; Chi Chi DeVayne as Eartha Kitt; Derrick Barry as Britney Spears; Kim Chi as Kimmy Jong-Un; Naomi Smalls as Tiffany Pollard; Robbie Turner as Diana Vreeland; Thorgy Thor as Michael Jackson; On the runway, category is Night of a Thousand Madonna's. Bob the Drag Queen, Derrick Barry and Thorgy Thor receive positive critiques, with Bob the Drag Queen winning the challenge. Acid Betty, Naomi Smalls and Robbie Turner receive negative critiques, with Robbie Turner being safe. Acid Betty and Naomi Smalls lip-sync to "Causing a Commotion" by Madonna. Naomi Smalls wins the lip-sync and Acid Betty sashays away.: Guest Judges: Gigi Hadid and Chanel Iman; Alternating Judge: Carson Kressley; Main Challenge: Snatch Game; Runway Theme: Night of a Thousand Madonna's; Challenge Winner: Bob the Drag Queen; Challenge Prize: A set of Lux De Ville hand bags; Bottom Two: Acid Betty and Naomi Smalls; Lip-Sync Song: "Causing a Commotion" by Madonna; Eliminated: Acid Betty; Farewell Message: "Ladies, You have been touched by fierceness! Now werq it out! -Bob, ❤️ you! See jew in new york. -Thorgy you are amazeballs -Acidbetty.com"
99	6	"Wizards of Drag"	April 11, 2016
For this week's mini-challenge, the queens read each other to filth. Bob the Drag Queen wins the mini-challenge. For the main challenge, the queens give Wizard of Oz themed makeovers to cast members of Little Women L.A..: Bob the Drag Queen - Glinda the Good Witch; Chi Chi DeVayne - Dorothy Gale; Derrick Barry - Tin Man; Kim Chi - The Wicked Witch of the West; Naomi Smalls - Scarecrow; Robbie Turner - The Cowardly Lion; Thorgy Thor - Emerald Citizen; On the runway, Kim Chi and Naomi Smalls receive positive critiques, with Naomi Smalls winning the challenge. Chi Chi DeVayne, Derrick Barry and Robbie Turner receive negative critiques, with Chi Chi DeVayne being safe. Derrick Barry and Robbie Turner lip-sync to "I Love It" by Icona Pop. Derrick Barry wins the lip-sync and Robbie Turner sashays away.: Guest Judges: Todrick Hall and Marc Jacobs; Alternating Judge: Ross Mathews; Mini-Challenge: Reading is Fundamental; Mini-Challenge Winner: Bob the Drag Queen; Main Challenge: Give Wizard of Oz-themed makeovers to cast members of Little Women L.A.; Challenge Winner: Naomi Smalls; Challenge Prize: $1,000 worth of spa services from The Spa on Rodeo; Bottom Two: Derrick Barry and Robbie Turner; Lip-Sync Song: "I Love It" by Icona Pop; Eliminated: Robbie Turner; Farewell Message: "My dearest trashbags, I'm sorry to leave you all so soon, but know this, the love I have for you is REAL + quite strong, also whoever wins owes me a tea or a steak dinner! Love you all, Robbie"
100	7	"Shady Politics"	April 18, 2016
For this week's mini-challenge, the queens play a true or false guessing game with the pit crew. Derrick Barry wins the mini-challenge. For the main challenge, the queens pair up to shoot presidential campaign ads to smear their partner and stake their claim to be the first drag President of the U.S.A.: Bob the Drag Queen and Derrick Barry; Chi Chi DeVayne and Thorgy Thor; Kim Chi and Naomi Smalls; On the runway, category is Black and White Realness. Bob the Drag Queen and Derrick Barry both win the challenge. Chi Chi DeVayne and Thorgy Thor receive negative critiques, are announced as the bottom two. They lip-sync to "And I Am Telling You I'm Not Going" from Jennifer Holliday. Chi Chi DeVayne wins the lip-sync and Thorgy Thor sashays away.: Guest Judges: Thomas Roberts and Vivica A. Fox; Alternating Judge(s): Carson Kressley; Mini-Challenge: Play a true or false guessing game with the pit crew; Mini-Challenge Winner: Derrick Barry; Main Challenge: Work in pairs to shoot presidential campaign ads to smear their partner and stake their claim to be the first drag President of the U.S.A.; Runway Theme: Black and White Realness; Challenge Winners: Bob the Drag Queen and Derrick Barry; Challenge Prize: A custom made gown from MountBatten Concepts; Bottom Two: Chi Chi DeVayne and Thorgy Thor; Lip-Sync Song: "And I Am Telling You I'm Not Going" from Jennifer Holliday; Eliminated: Thorgy Thor; Farewell Message: "Clowns! All of you!! Come to NY - but please take down Bob! ... She's terrible! - anyway - ❤️ you guys! top 3?....... Naomi, Bob, Deryk... Let's see.... (that was shady!) ❤️ thorgy"
101	8	"RuPaul Book Ball"	April 25, 2016
For this week's mini-challenge, the queens have a bitchfest with puppets. Chi Chi DeVayne wins the mini-challenge. For the main challenge, the queens create three looks for the Book Ball: Baby Drag Realness, That's My Mama Realness and Book Couture. On the runway, Chi Chi DeVayne, Kim Chi and Naomi Smalls receive positive critiques, with Kim Chi winning the challenge. Bob the Drag Queen and Derrick Barry receive negative critiques, and are announced as the bottom two. They lip-sync to "You Make Me Feel (Mighty Real)" by Sylvester. Bob the Drag Queen wins the lip-sync and Derrick Barry sashays away.: Guest Judges: Amy Sedaris and David Sedaris; Alternating Judge(s): Ross Mathews; Mini-Challenge: Everybody Loves Puppets; Mini-Challenge Winner: Chi Chi DeVayne; Main Challenge: The Book Ball; Runway Themes: Baby Drag Realness, That's My Mama Realness and Book Couture; Challenge Winner: Kim Chi; Challenge Prize: A $2,500 gift card from Fabric Planet; Bottom Two: Bob the Drag Queen and Derrick Barry; Lip-Sync Song: "You Make Me Feel (Mighty Real)" by Sylvester; Eliminated: Derrick Barry; Farewell Message: "To my top 4, Ru said I won the challenge! What happened? I love you all! ❤️ Derrick Bitch!"
102	9	"The Realness"	May 2, 2016
For the final challenge of the season, the queens star in RuPaul's music video "The Realness". On the runway, category is Best Drag. The four remaining queens lip-sync to "The Realness" by RuPaul. Chi Chi DeVayne is then eliminated, with Bob the Drag Queen, Kim Chi and Naomi Smalls being the finalists of the season.: Special Guest: Jayson Whitmore; Alternating Judge(s): Ross Mathews and Carson Kressley; Main Challenge: Star in RuPaul's music video "The Realness"; Runway Theme: Best Drag; Lip-Sync Song: "The Realness" by RuPaul; Eliminated: Chi Chi DeVayne
103	10	"Grand Finale"	May 16, 2016
All the queens return for the live grand finale. The final three queens then perform to a song that was written specifically for them. Bob the Drag Queen lip-syncs to "I Don't Like to Show Off", Kim Chi lip-syncs to "Fat Fem and Asian" and Naomi Smalls lip-syncs to "Legs". It is announced that Cynthia Lee Fontaine is this season's Miss Congeniality. It is the announced that Bob the Drag Queen is the winner, leaving Kim Chi and Naomi Smalls as the runners-up.: Miss Congeniality: Cynthia Lee Fontaine; Runners Up: Kim Chi and Naomi Smalls; Winner of RuPaul's Drag Race Season Eight: Bob the Drag Queen

== Reception ==
In August 2022, Time listed season 8 of RuPaul's Drag Race as among the Top 50 Most Influential Reality TV Seasons.

=== Ratings ===
Viewership and ratings per episode of RuPaul's Drag Race season 8
No.	Title	Air date	Rating (18–49)	Viewers (millions)	Ref.
1	"Keeping It 100!"	March 7, 2016	0.17	0.377	
2	"Bitch Perfect"	March 14, 2016	0.17	0.358	
3	"RuCo's Empire"	March 21, 2016	0.13	0.286	
4	"New Wave Queens"	March 28, 2016	0.15	0.297	
5	"Supermodel Snatch Game"	April 4, 2016	0.15	0.327	
6	"Wizards of Drag"	April 11, 2016	0.16	0.326	
7	"Shady Politics"	April 18, 2016	0.17	0.320	
8	"RuPaul Book Ball"	April 25, 2016	0.16	0.315	
9	"The Realness"	May 2, 2016	0.17	0.358	
10	"Grand Finale"	May 16, 2016	0.13	0.319	

== See also ==
- List of Rusicals
