= Laila McQueen =

American drag queen and makeup artist

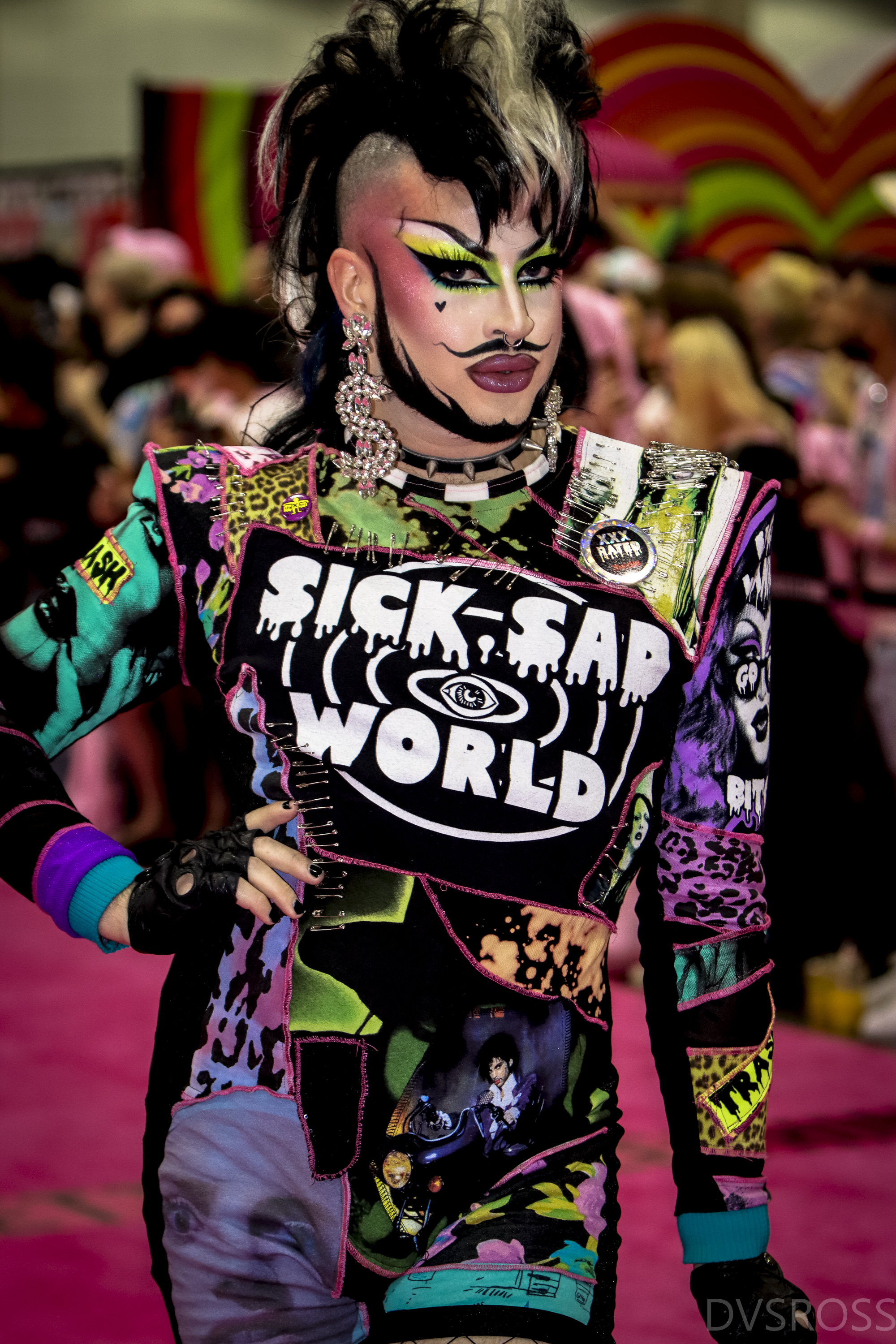
- Laila McQueen at RuPaul's DragCon LA, 2022
- Born: Tyler Devlin; June 22, 1993 (age 33); Gloucester, Massachusetts, U.S.
- Occupations: Drag performer; make-up artist
- Years active: 2016–present
- Television: RuPaul's Drag Race (season 8)

Laila McQueen is the stage name of Tyler Devlin, a drag performer and make-up artist based in Gloucester, Massachusetts. Laila McQueen competed on season 8 of RuPaul's Drag Race in 2016. She has won a Primetime Emmy Award as a make-up artist for the HBO reality series We're Here.

== Early life ==
Devlin was born in Gloucester, Massachusetts to Cathy Devlin LaFata and Michael Devlin. He was artistic in school, which led to bullying from his peers. Devlin started cross dressing in high school at age 15 to ignore the bullying and to showcase his creative outlet before doing drag as a career at 18. He graduated from Gloucester High School in 2011.

Devlin moved to Manchester, New Hampshire in 2011 to attend art school and graduated from New Hampshire Institute of Art in 2015, before he moved back to Gloucester.

== Career ==
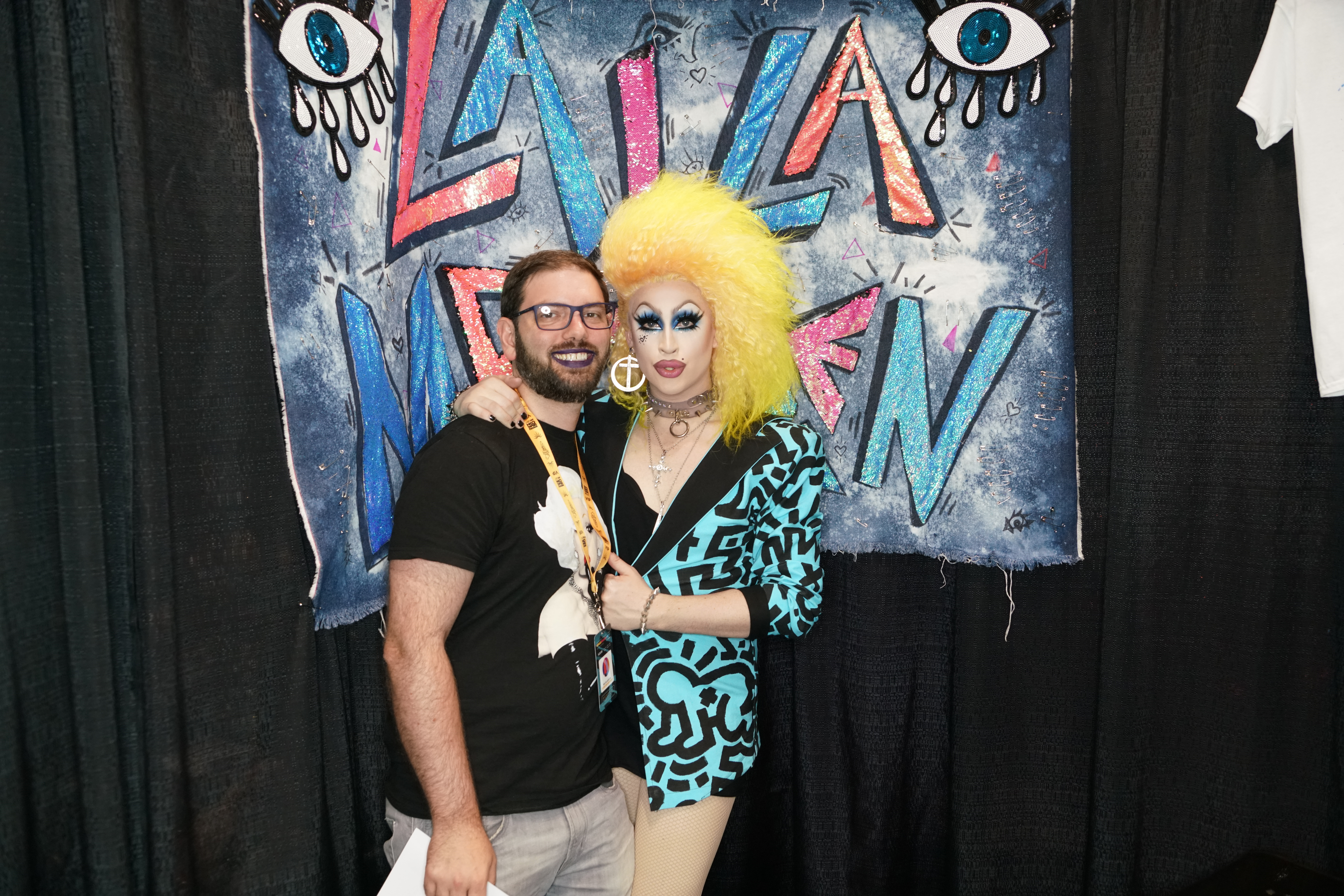
Laila McQueen (right) at RuPaul's DragCon NYC, 2017

In 2016, Laila McQueen was cast for season 8 of RuPaul's Drag Race. On the first episode, she placed in the bottom with Naysha Lopez and won a lip sync to "Applause" by Lady Gaga. On the second episode, she placed in the bottom again with Dax ExclamationPoint. Both were eliminated after a lip sync to "I Will Survive" by Gloria Gaynor. Laila McQueen has said she wanted to impersonate Betsey Johnson, Courtney Love, or Theresa Caputo for the Snatch Game challenge.

After Drag Race, she worked as a make-up artist from RuPaul's Secret Celebrity Drag Race with Shannel and Mayhem Miller. Laila McQueen did make-up for Jordan Connor on the show. Later on, she also did make-up for the cast of We're Here. In 2022, Laila McQueen won the Creative Arts Emmy for Outstanding Makeup for a Variety, Nonfiction or Reality Program for her work on the episode "Kona, Hawaii".

== Personal life ==
Devlin has a sensory-based disorder called misophonia. He has lived in Chicago, Illinois, since 2017, but works in many locations. When he was 19, he was banned from the University of Maine for a performance that involved a Bible being covered in blood.

When asked about describing her drag, Laila McQueen said "I'm an idiot, I'm such an idiot. I just like to have fun and for other people to have fun, too. I started doing drag from a negative place to replace those feelings. I've always wanted to be a rock star and this is my way to express that, and I'm an artist above all else. Drag gave me an extension to capture those dreams you didn't think would happen, and I've gotten a lot of things I never thought I'd be able to."

== Awards and nominations ==
=== Emmy Awards ===
The Emmy Awards are awarded annually by the National Academy of Television Arts and Sciences. McQueen has won 1 award.

Year	Award	Nominated work	Result
2022	Outstanding Makeup For A Variety, Nonfiction Or Reality Program	We're Here	Won
2024	Outstanding Makeup For A Variety, Nonfiction Or Reality Program	We're Here	Nominated
