= Robbie Turner (drag queen) =

American drag queen and writer

- Born: Jeremy Baird; Centralia, Washington, U.S.
- Occupation: Drag queen
- Known for: RuPaul's Drag Race (season 8)

Robbie Turner is the stage name of Jeremy Baird, an American drag queen and writer most known for competing on the eighth season of RuPaul's Drag Race.

== Early life ==
Baird was raised by Pentecostal ministers in Centralia, Washington.

== Career ==
Early in her career, Turner performed at Tacoma, Washington's pride festival. In Seattle, she performed at the bar R Place and hosted the Robbie Turner Revue at the Hard Rock Café.

Turner auditioned for RuPaul's Drag Race multiple times before being cast for the eighth season. Fellow Seattle performer Jinkx Monsoon endorsed Turner in the submitted audition tape. During the "Snatch Game" competition, Turner portrayed Diana Vreeland. Turner was eliminated from Drag Race after losing a lip sync battle to Derrick Barry. Vulture ranked Turner number 53 on their list of "Every Snatch Game Impersonation on RuPaul's Drag Race, Ranked". The Independent's Lily Pearson included Turner's lip sync against Cynthia Lee Fontaine in her list of "the most unmissable moments" in Drag Race history. In 2018, Instinct ranked Turner number 80 in the article, "The Definitive List: Ranking All the RuPaul's Drag Race Queens from 1 to 126", and Stephen Daw of Billboard ranked Les Chicken Wings (a group composed of Turner, Kim Chi, and Naomi Smalls) number 18 on his list of the "50 Best Musical Moments" on the show.

Turner has appeared on the web series "Capitol Hill" with BenDeLaCreme. She appeared on Hey Qween in 2017. Turner wrote the book, I'll Tell You for Free.

In addition to performing at Seattle's Queer/Bar, Turner has served as the bar's entertainment producer. Turner took a "personal leave" in 2018.

== Personal life ==
Baird lived in Seattle's Capitol Hill neighborhood, as of 2016.

In April 2018, Baird claimed to be involved in a fatal Uber accident. He later admitted the accident did not happen, after media outlets noted inconsistencies with his story.

== Filmography ==
=== Television ===
Year	Title	Role	Notes
2016	RuPaul's Drag Race	Herself	Contestant (7th place)
2016	RuPaul's Drag Race: Untucked	Herself	

=== Web series ===
Year	Title
2017	Capitol Hill
2017	Hey Qween!

== See also ==
- LGBTQ culture in Seattle
