= Naysha Lopez =

American-Puerto Rican drag queen

- Born: Fabian Rodriguez; June 20, 1984 (age 42); Chicago, Illinois, U.S.
- Occupations: Drag performer, beauty pageant participant
- Television: RuPaul's Drag Race (season 8); RuPaul's Drag Race All Stars (season 8)
- Awards: Miss Continental 2013

Naysha Lopez is the stage name of drag performer and beauty pageant winner Fabian Rodriguez (born June 20, 1984), who won the 2013 Miss Continental competition and appeared on the eighth seasons of both RuPaul's Drag Race and RuPaul's Drag Race All Stars.

== Career ==
After competing on the beauty pageant circuit, Naysha Lopez won the 2013 Miss Continental competition.

Naysha Lopez competed on the eighth season of RuPaul's Drag Race in 2016, after building a drag career in Puerto Rico and Chicago. She was the first queen eliminated, losing the lip sync battle to "Applause" by Lady Gaga against Laila McQueen. Naysha was quickly brought back to the show for ep. 3 after a lackluster performance on ep. 2 by McQueen and Dax ExclamationPoint resulted in their dual-elimination; Naysha subsequently placed in the bottom two again and lost another lipsync, this time against Chi Chi DeVayne to Blondie's "Call Me", and became the fourth queen on the show to be eliminated twice in the same season (after Carmen Carrera, Kenya Michaels, and Trixie Mattel). Queerty's Timothy Allen said she was "one of the most beautiful queens to ever compete on the show". Similarly, Michael Cook of South Florida Gay News said she was "arguably one of the most stunningly gorgeous queens to ever stomp the runway" on the series, to date.

At RuPaul's DragCon LA convention in 2018, Naysha Lopez and Tempest DuJour tied for "fan favorite" in the “RuPaul's DragCon Pageant”, an event where "queens who were eliminated first on their seasons battled it out for the crowd", according to Patrick Crowley of Billboard magazine.

In 2021, Rodriguez was first runner-up in the Mr. Continental competition, winning in the swimsuit category.

In 2022, Naysha Lopez was among a group of drag queens who performed on-stage with Jennifer Lopez at the iHeartRadio Music Awards. The performance was a "full-circle" moment for Naysha, as she has repeatedly expressed admiration for Lopez as an artist, performer and businesswoman on many occasions, posting on Instagram in 2019: "Jennifer Lopez will always be a huge inspiration for me and my drag. Her take on Fashion and work ethic is like no other." In 2023, she returned and competed on the eighth season of RuPaul's Drag Race All Stars, ultimately being eliminated on episode 2 after she placed in the bottom two contestants, alongside Kahanna Montrese. The surprise lip-sync "assassin" of the episode, Thai drag performer Pangina Heals, won in a lip-sync against challenge winner Jimbo to Cyndi Lauper's "She Bop", and, as she received the majority of the votes to be eliminated from the safe queens, Naysha was sent home, placing eleventh out of twelve queens.

== Personal life ==
Rodriguez has a working class background, and is a licensed cosmetologist. Rodriguez's family moved back into Puerto Rico until the age of 7 before moving back to Chicago. He spent most of his life in Chicago, attending Lane Tech College Prep High School (graduating class of 2002), and, in 2023, was living on the city's Northwest Side and working in Lake View, also known as Boystown. She also lived in Belmont Cragin, in 2016, and Elmwood Park, Illinois.

As Naysha Lopez, Rodriguez hosts a popular weekly viewing party for RuPaul’s Drag Race, live-streamed from Chicago gay bar Roscoe's Tavern on YouTube. Along with co-hosts Kara Mel and Batty Davis, the event features anywhere from 2-4 guests, usually other queens from the show, as well as occasional judges from the series or other media personalities. Other guests at Roscoe's have included contestants and winners from Canada's Drag Race and RuPaul's Drag Race UK. The group gives intermittent commentary during and after the episode, with behind-the-scenes gossip and information often being revealed, hence there is a strict no-filming policy at the bar.

Naysha Lopez is a member of the House of Hall, a drag family headed by pageantry icon Tajma Hall (1970–2014), which includes fellow Drag Race contestants DiDa Ritz (season 4), Jaida Essence Hall (season 12 winner) and Kahmora Hall (season 13).

As of 2024, Rodriguez is currently residing in Los Angeles, explaining in a podcast interview with fellow Drag Race alum Delta Work that he values the position hosting the viewing parties at Roscoe's Tavern (in Chicago) so much that he travels weekly between California and Illinois, stating: "I do my thing every week, and I have one of the best jobs, ever…Roscoe's has really stepped-up and shown appreciation for their talent." Rodriguez is currently dating Jason Hughes.

== Discography ==
=== Singles ===
==== As featured artist ====
Title	Year	Album
"Money, Success, Fame, Glamour" (Glam Rock version) (with the cast of RuPaul's Drag Race All Stars, season 8)	2023	Non-album single

== Filmography ==
=== Television ===
List of television credits
Year	Title	Role	Notes	Ref.
2016	RuPaul's Drag Race (season 8)	Herself/Contestant	9th place	
2016	RuPaul's Drag Race: Untucked	Herself/Contestant	9th place	
2018	The Jam	Herself	Guest	
2023	RuPaul's Drag Race: All Stars (season 8)	Herself/Contestant	11th Place	
2023	RuPaul's Drag Race All Stars: Untucked	Herself/Contestant	11th Place	

=== Web series ===
List of web series credits
Year	Title	Role	Notes	Ref.
2016	Meet the Queens	Herself	Stand-alone special RuPaul's Drag Race Season 8	
2017	Backhanded Compliments	Herself	Guest	
2017	VideoOut	Herself	Guest	
2017	Hey Qween!	Herself	Guest	
2019	Kiki with Kimora Blac	Herself	Guest	
2019	Out Of The Closet	Herself	Guest	
2022	Naysha Lopez: White Sox Pride Night	Herself	Stand-alone special	
2022	The Pit Stop	Herself	Guest	
2023	Meet the Queens	Herself	Stand-alone special RuPaul's Drag Race All Stars 8	
2023	EW News Flash	Herself	Guest	
2023	BuzzFeed Celeb	Herself	Guest	
2026	The Kelly Mantle Show	Herself	Guest	
