= Acid Betty =

American drag performer

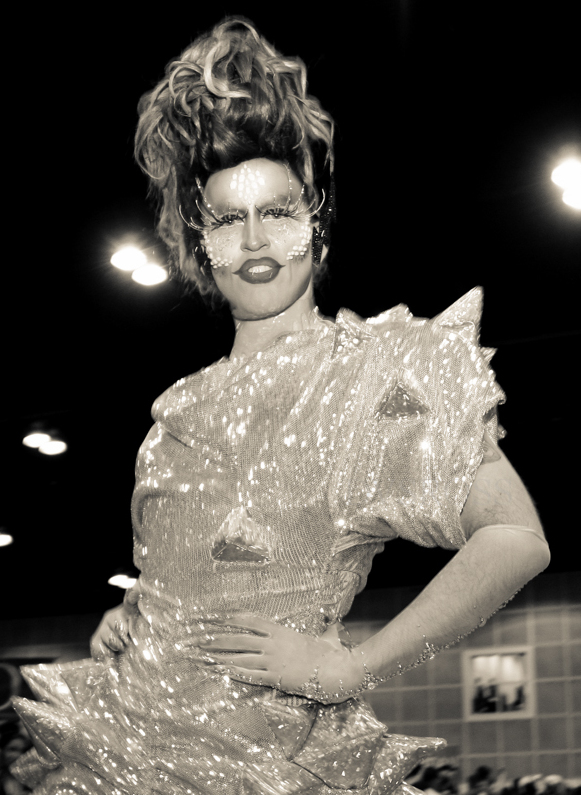
- Acid Betty in 2019
- Born: Jamin Ruhren; December 10, 1977 (age 48); Riverside, California, U.S.
- Occupations: Drag queen; performer; actor; singer
- Years active: 2006–present
- Television: RuPaul's Drag Race (season 8) and RuPaul's Drag Race All Stars (season 10)
- Website: acidbetty.com

Jamin Ruhren (born December 10, 1977), better known by the stage name Acid Betty, is an American drag queen, performer, actor and singer. He rose to national prominence after competing on the eighth season of RuPaul's Drag Race in 2016 and the tenth season of RuPaul's Drag Race All Stars in 2025.

== Early life ==
Jamin Ruhren was born on December 10, 1977, in Riverside, California. He is Jewish.

As a child, Ruhren's first experience with drag came during a practical joke in which he posed as his sister's "cousin from out of town", using her cheerleader pompoms as improvised hair and breasts. He later recalled that the experience made him realize he could convincingly present as female, joking that he looked like "a fat Raggedy Ann".

At age 17, Ruhren attended his first drag club, where he saw future RuPaul's Drag Race winner Raja perform.

== Career ==
=== Early career ===
Ruhren became active in New York City's drag scene, where veteran drag performer Sherry Vine became his drag mother. Ruhren later recalled spending time with Vine and her social circle before becoming her drag daughter.

Before appearing on RuPaul's Drag Race, Ruhren was featured as a guest in a 2008 episode of Project Runway, on which RuPaul served as the guest judge.

The following year, Ruhren appeared in the film An Englishman in New York with John Hurt. She next appeared alongside Bianca Del Rio, Mimi Imfurst, and Peppermint in the 2010 eight-part web documentary Queens of Drag: NYC.

In 2011, Ruhren served as ringmaster for Lincoln Center's "Rock and Roll Circus".

=== RuPaul's Drag Race ===
Ruhren was announced to be one of twelve competing on season eight of RuPaul's Drag Race on February 1, 2016. She was eliminated in episode five after performing badly on the annual snatch game challenge, and later losing a lip sync to Madonna's "Causing a Commotion" against Naomi Smalls.

After the show, Ruhren made a cameo appearance in The Path in 2018. In July 2020, Ruhren was featured in Drive N' Drag, a drive-in drag show. In April 2025, Acid Betty was announced as one of eighteen former Drag Race contestants competing in the tenth season of RuPaul's Drag Race All Stars. She was eliminated at the end of her bracket, not making it to the semi finals.

=== Music ===
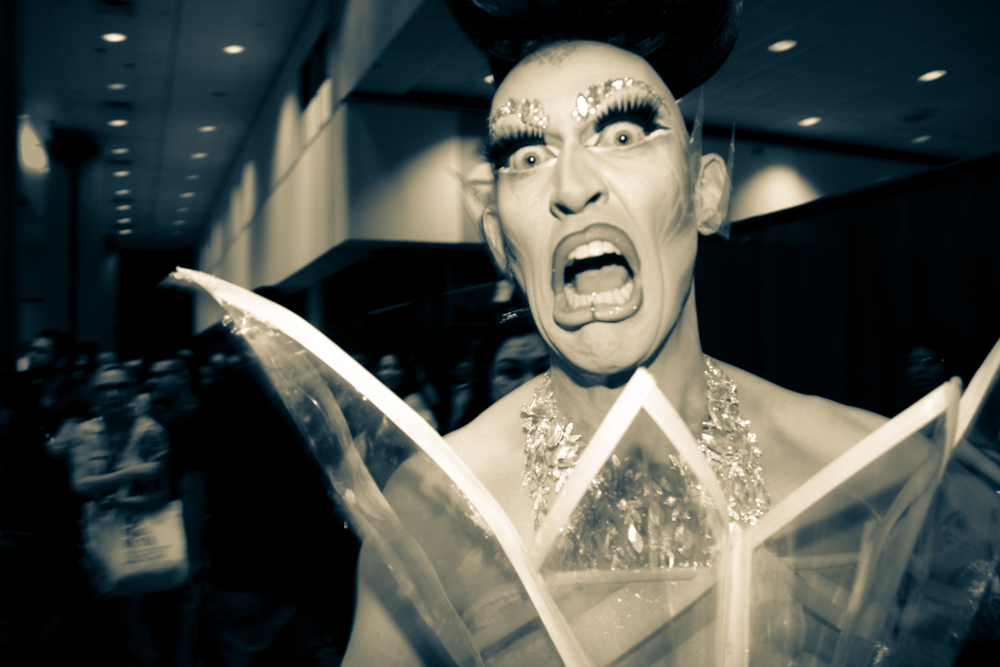
Acid Betty, 2017

In November 2011, Ruhren appeared in the music video for Cazwell's "Unzip Me". Ruhren released her first single, "Ruthless", on March 1, 2012. Her second single, "Fantasy", was released on May 15, 2016. The music video features season eight finalists Kim Chi and Bob the Drag Queen. A third single, "Acid (Drop)", was available three days later.

== Personal life ==
Ruhren is based in Monroe County, Pennsylvania

== Filmography ==
=== Film ===
| Year | Title | Role |
|---|---|---|
| 2009 | An Englishman in New York | Herself |

=== Television ===
| Year | Title | Role | Notes |
|---|---|---|---|
| 2008 | Project Runway | Herself | Guest (season five) |
| 2016 | RuPaul's Drag Race (season 8) | Herself | Contestant (8th Place) |
| 2016 | RuPaul's Drag Race: Untucked (season 7) | Herself | Contestant (8th Place) |
| 2018 | The Path | Herself | Season 3, Episode 8: "The Door" |
| 2020 | Tales from the Trip | Herself | Episode 35: "Acid Betty" |
| 2025 | RuPaul's Drag Race All Stars (season 10) | Herself | Contestant (11th Place) |
| 2025 | RuPaul's Drag Race All Stars: Untucked! (season 7) | Herself | Contestant (11th Place) |

=== Music videos ===
| Year | Title | Artist | Ref. |
|---|---|---|---|
| 2011 | "Unzip Me" | Cazwell | |
| 2012 | "Ruthless" | Herself | |

=== Web series ===
| Year | Title | Role | Ref. |
|---|---|---|---|
| 2010 | Queens of Drag: NYC | Herself | |
| 2016 | RuPaul's Drag Race: Untucked | Herself | |
| 2016 | Bus Buddies | Herself | |
| 2018 | Out of the Closet | Herself | |
| 2018 | Hey Qween! | Herself | |
| 2020 | The Pit Stop | Herself | |

== Discography ==
=== Singles ===
| Year | Title |
|---|---|
| 2012 | "Ruthless" |
| 2016 | "Fantasy" |
| 2016 | "Acid (Drop)" |

== See also ==
- Drag culture in New York City
- LGBTQ culture in New York City
- List of LGBTQ people from New York City
- NYC Drag March
- NYC Pride March
- Transgender culture in New York City
