= Chi Chi DeVayne =

American drag queen (1985–2020)

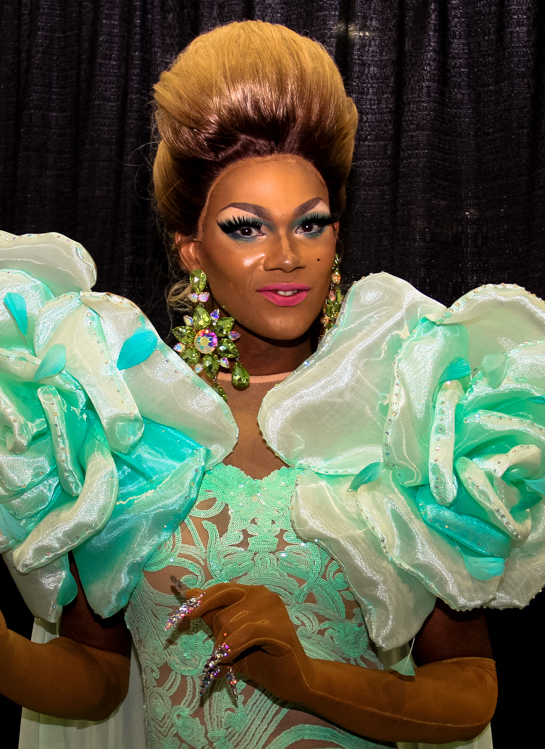
- Chi Chi DeVayne at RuPaul's DragCon LA, 2018
- Born: Zavion Michael Davenport; September 24, 1985; Shreveport, Louisiana, U.S.
- Died: August 20, 2020 (aged 34); Shreveport, Louisiana, U.S.
- Occupation: Drag queen
- Known for: RuPaul's Drag Race (season 8); RuPaul's Drag Race All Stars (season 3)

Zavion Michael Davenport (September 24, 1985 – August 20, 2020), better known by the stage name Chi Chi DeVayne, was an American drag queen and reality television personality who came to international attention on the eighth season of RuPaul's Drag Race and on the third season of RuPaul's Drag Race All Stars. DeVayne began her drag career in her native Shreveport, Louisiana, where she was known locally prior to her 2016 debut on Drag Race. Following her time on the show, DeVayne embarked on a number of domestic and international tours, and she was featured on several web series about drag.

Davenport was diagnosed with scleroderma in 2018 and, two years later, he died following a bout of pneumonia he contracted after a hospital stay for scleroderma-related kidney failure.

== Early life and career ==
I was always a little performer. My uncle used to stage talent shows with all us cousins, and my mom saw something in me. She had me in gymnastics, and I was in a dance company in my twenties.

— Davenport, in a 2018 interview

Zavion Michael Davenport was born on September 24, 1985, in Shreveport, Louisiana, to Alberteen Wyandon and Zan Davenport III. He had a sister, Brittany; a brother, DaRico Wyandon; and two half-brothers, Zachary and Zamien Willis.

As a child, Davenport took classes in ballet and in West African and modern dance. He described parts of his upbringing as rough: he carried a gun, got into trouble, and joined gangs. In an interview on RuPaul's Drag Race, he said, "Girl, I've seen people shot. I've smelled, like, the smell of brains. When I tell you I come from the streets, I'm not kidding." Davenport attended Fair Park High School, where he was a drum major in the marching band. After graduating in 2003, he began performing in drag on the local nightlife scene. Prior to appearing on Drag Race, Davenport worked two nine-to-five jobs to support himself.

== Drag ==
DeVayne's first name, Chi Chi, was inspired by the character Chi-Chi Rodriguez from To Wong Foo, Thanks for Everything! Julie Newmar, and the surname DeVayne came from the DeVayne drag family of Shreveport. Her drag mothers were Kourtni DeVayne and Lady Phat Kat. DeVayne enjoyed using different shades of purple makeup. In her early days as a drag entertainer, she was a regular performer at the Central Station nightclub in Shreveport, where she became known for her backflips.

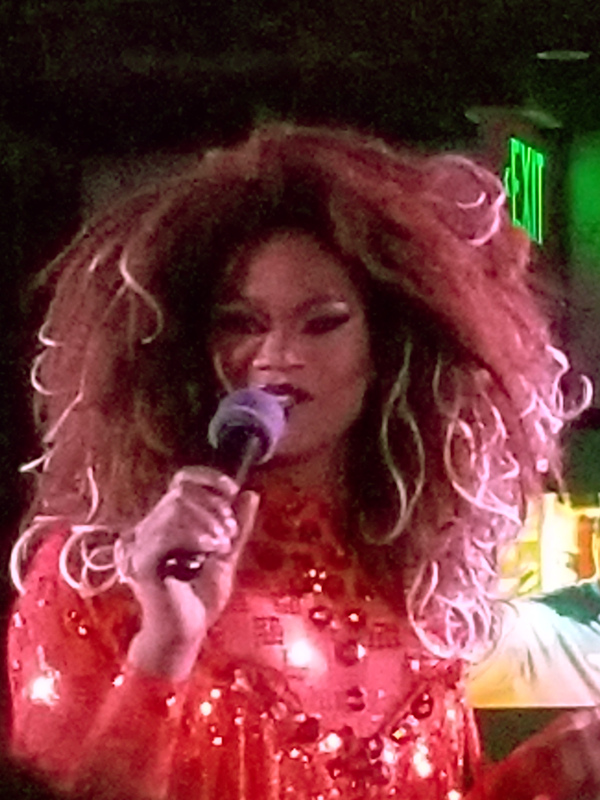
Chi Chi DeVayne, 2018

DeVayne competed on the eighth season of RuPaul's Drag Race, which began airing on March 7, 2016. HuffPost's James Michael Nichols said she "was the dark horse [of the] season, walking through the doors in the first episode in a dress literally made out of garbage bags". The BBC called her lip sync to "And I Am Telling You I'm Not Going", through which she eliminated fellow contestant Thorgy Thor, "iconic in Drag Race history". Out dubbed the performance one of the series' best lip syncs. DeVayne made it to the top four but was eliminated before Kim Chi and Naomi Smalls; Bob the Drag Queen won the crown. DeVayne said of the experience: "It changed everything in my life. Everything has turned in a different direction. Before, I was just like, 'What's a good job that I could get here in town, working in a factory?'. It's crazy."

DeVayne was interviewed on RuPaul's podcast RuPaul: What's the Tee? in 2016. The next year, she toured with A Drag Queen Christmas, and she was subsequently a cast member of several international live shows featuring Drag Race contestants. In March 2018, she was a part of Max Emerson's series Drag Babies, which was hosted by Bob the Drag Queen. She served as a drag mentor alongside Peppermint and Shuga Cain. DeVayne then appeared on the third season of RuPaul's Drag Race All Stars, which premiered on January 25, 2018. She was eliminated in the fourth episode, originally placing seventh, but she ultimately finished eighth after Morgan McMichaels returned to the competition. DeVayne credited her experience on Drag Race with helping her heal from some of the difficulties of her past.

== Personal life ==
Davenport was gay.

I am heartbroken to learn of the passing of Chi Chi DeVayne. I am so grateful that we got to experience her kind and beautiful soul. She will be dearly missed, but never forgotten. May her generous and loving spirit shine down on us all.

— RuPaul, responding to news of DeVayne's death on Twitter

In 2018, he was diagnosed with scleroderma, an autoimmune condition. He reported that the disease had caused him to lose weight and had reduced his capacity to dance in early 2020. On July 17 of that year, he was rushed to the hospital with hypertension and scleroderma-related kidney failure. This prompted fans and fellow Drag Race contestants to initiate fundraising efforts for his medical bills. Two days later, he posted an update on social media, saying, "I let it go too long without going to the doctor, and these are the consequences". He also expressed appreciation for the outpouring of support from fans and colleagues, and he stated that he was undergoing dialysis treatment. Four weeks later, Davenport was readmitted to the hospital with pneumonia. During that time, he made his final social media post, a video asking fans to keep him in their prayers and promising to "be back soon". He died on August 20, 2020, at the age of 34.

Celebrities including Padma Lakshmi, Ross Mathews and Miss Coco Peru paid tribute to DeVayne. Many fellow Drag Race contestants also expressed condolences; these included Aja, Alexis Mateo, Alexis Michelle, Aquaria, BeBe Zahara Benet, Bianca Del Rio, Cheryl Hole, Detox, Farrah Moan, Heidi N Closet, India Ferrah, Jaida Essence Hall, Kennedy Davenport, Monét X Change, Nina Bo'nina Brown, Ongina, Pandora Boxx, Peppermint, Priyanka, Roxxxy Andrews, Shea Couleé, Tatianna, Trinity the Tuck, Trixie Mattel and The Vivienne. In a memorial post, GLAAD called DeVayne "an incredible performer and such a bright light".

The finale episode of RuPaul's Drag Race season 13—the first to air after DeVayne's death—contained a tribute segment wherein RuPaul and several former contestants shared memories of DeVayne's life and work. In 2022, director Stephen Dunn announced that DeVayne was meant to play the character Bussy on Queer as Folk, but she was replaced by Armand Fields after she died. Dunn stated that he set the series in New Orleans due to his longtime friendship with DeVayne.

== Discography ==
Title	Year	Album	Ref
"Sitting on a Secret" (RuPaul feat. Aja, Chi Chi DeVayne, Milk, Morgan McMichaels & Thorgy Thor)	2018	Non-album singles	
"GFY" (Randy Boo feat. Chi Chi DeVayne)	2020	Non-album singles	

== Filmography ==
=== Television ===
Year	Title	Role	Notes	Ref
2016	RuPaul's Drag Race (season 8)	Herself	Contestant (fourth place)	
2018	RuPaul's Drag Race All Stars (season 3)	Herself	Contestant (eighth place)	
2020	Little America	Herself	Guest	

=== Web series ===
Year	Title	Role	Notes	Ref
2016	RuPaul's Drag Race: Untucked	Herself	Companion show to RuPaul's Drag Race	
2016	#CuCuCONFESSIONS	Herself	Guest; hosted by Cynthia Lee Fontaine	
2017	How to Makeup	Herself	World of Wonder series	
2017	Craigslist Missed Connections	Herself	Guest	
2018	Cosmo Queens	Herself	Guest	
2018	Drag Babies	Herself	Drag mentor	
2018	Whatcha Packin'	Herself	Guest	
2019	Hey Qween!	Herself	Valentine's Day special	
2020	Bootleg Opinions	Herself	Guest	

=== Music videos ===
Year	Title	Artist	Notes	Ref(s)
2020	"GFY"	Randy Boo feat. Chi Chi DeVayne		
2020	"The Realness (Chi Chi DeVayne Edit)"	RuPaul	Posthumous release	
2021	"Gummy Bear"	Ginger Minj	Posthumous release	

== Theatre ==
Year	Production	Role	Venue	Ref
2019	Women Behind Bars	Jo-Jo	The Montalbán	
