= Cynthia Lee Fontaine =

Puerto Rican drag queen

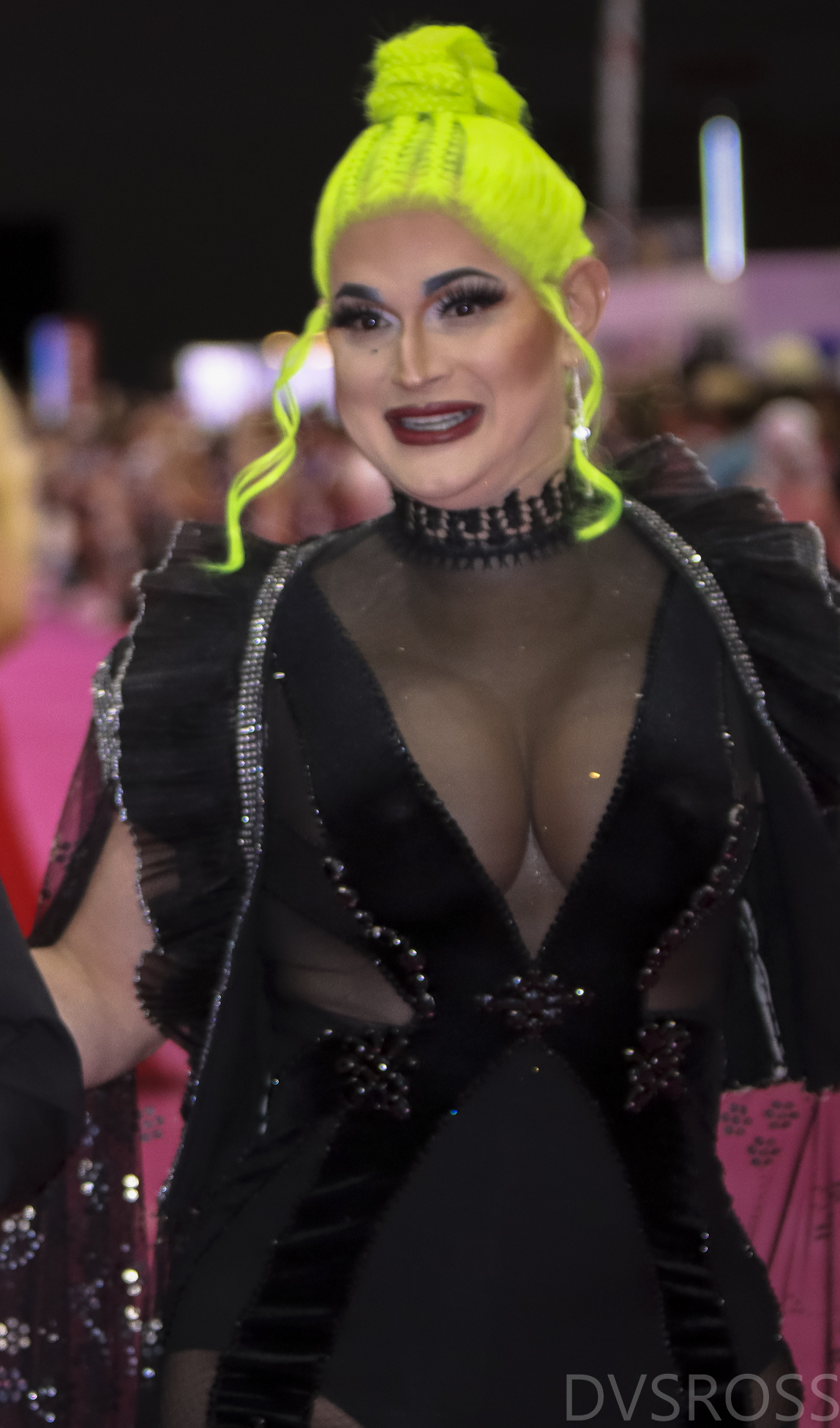
- Cynthia Lee Fontaine in 2022
- Born: Carlos Díaz Hernández; February 16, 1981 (age 45); San Juan, Puerto Rico
- Occupation: Drag queen
- Television: RuPaul's Drag Race (season 8, season 9) and RuPaul's Drag Race All Stars (season 10)
- Term: Miss Congeniality
- Predecessor: Katya Zamolodchikova
- Successor: Valentina
- Website: cynthialeefontaine.com

Cynthia Lee Fontaine is the stage name of Carlos Díaz Hernández, a Puerto Rican drag performer and reality television personality from Austin, Texas, best known for competing on the eighth and ninth seasons of RuPaul's Drag Race, as well as the tenth season of RuPaul's Drag Race All Stars. She won the title of Miss Congeniality on season 8.

== Early life and education ==
Hernández was born in San Juan, Puerto Rico as the oldest child of Maria Hernandez. He has a degree in clinical psychology and worked in the mental health field for six years before starting drag. Hernández began doing drag in Puerto Rico in 2006, and moved to Killeen, Texas in 2008, where he started performing at Oil Can Harry's. He moved to Austin in 2011 and continued performing.

== Career ==
Cynthia Lee Fontaine competed on the eighth season of RuPaul's Drag Race, which premiered on March 7, 2016. During the show, she frequently referred to her "cucu", meaning buttocks, which became a part of the show's slang. Entertainment Weekly said "cucu" has evolved "into the queer pop cultural canon". Cynthia Lee Fontaine was the third queen eliminated, garnering a 10th-place finish. Even though she was only on the show for three episodes, She was voted Miss Congeniality by the fans, giving her the distinction of being voted Miss Congeniality while having spent the least amount of time on the show compared to other award recipients.

Cynthia Lee Fontaine was invited back for RuPaul's Drag Race season 9 as the surprise 14th queen. The show premiered on March 24, 2017. In episode six, She portrayed Sofia Vergara for Snatch Game, an impersonation that was not received well by the judges. The A.V. Club wrote "Cynthia Lee Fontaine’s Sofia Vergara is the big disaster of this "Snatch Game," and even without the largely incomprehensible dialogue, it's a failure on a visual level." Cynthia Lee Fontaine ended up securing once again the 10th-place finish, being sent home in a lipsync challenge against Peppermint. In an interview with Vulture, Cynthia Lee Fontaine said:

It was probably my time, you know? I'm a fighter. I may have been a little bit concerned about the challenges and all this stuff, but I respect the panel of judges and RuPaul. I got so much from season nine, so no regrets.

The Houston Chronicle, lamenting her short run on the show in season 8, stated Cynthia Lee Fontaine was "like a bilingual Tammie Brown", referencing another queen from season 1 of the show. Denver Pride called her "a fixture of the Austin drag scene". Cynthia Lee Fontaine is a regular guest at the RuPaul's Drag Cons. She appeared at RuPaul's DragCon LA 2016 and 2017, and at RuPaul's DragCon NYC in 2017 and 2019.

In November 2017, Cynthia Lee Fontaine participated in Queens United/Reinas Unidas, a benefit show organized by Phi Phi O'Hara in support of Puerto Rico following Hurricane Maria. The show raised over $80,000. Cynthia Lee Fontaine stated, "Puerto Rico, you are part of our heart in the United States of America. I'm Puerto Rican. I love you from the bottom of my heart, and you've got our support." In September 2018, Cynthia Lee Fontaine became the third drag queen ever hosted at Bowdoin College in Brunswick, Maine. Previous drag queens performed there in 2012 and 2015. The event, hosted by the Latin American Student Organization, included a performance and interview, which "touched on themes of family, health and getting out of one's comfort zone." On her YouTube channel, Cynthia Lee Fontaine has two shows: CuCu Confessions and Memoirs of My CuCu. She also headlines a one-woman show called Cynthia Lee Fontaine: More Intimate CuCu Confessions, which she performs around the United States.

Cynthia Lee Fontaine released her first single "Pegajosa" in November 2018. Writing for World of Wonder, James St. James called the song "fabulous" and the accompanying music video "ultra-fabuloso".

On April 23, 2025, Cynthia Lee Fontaine was announced as one of eighteen former Drag Race contestants participating in the tenth season of RuPaul's Drag Race All Stars, where she placed in 10th.

== Personal life and recognition ==
Hernández was diagnosed with stage 1 liver cancer in 2015, two weeks after filming the third episode of the eighth season of Drag Race. He stated during the filming of the show he lost 47 pounds. After four rounds of chemotherapy, he went into remission. He also revealed on the show that he almost performed at Pulse nightclub the night of the Orlando shooting in 2016. He stated, "we never expect that a tragedy like this would happen in our community. We thought we'd finally built a safe space."

The City of Austin was set to proclaim March 26, 2020, as Cynthia Lee Fontaine Day, but had to postpone because of the COVID-19 pandemic in Texas.

== Filmography ==
=== Television ===
Year	Title	Notes
2016	RuPaul's Drag Race (season 8)	Contestant (10th place)
2017	RuPaul's Drag Race (season 9)	Contestant (10th place)
2017	Hey Qween!	
2023	Vai na Fé	Herself
2025	RuPaul's Drag Race All Stars (season 10)	Contestant (10th place)

=== Music videos ===
Year	Title	Artist	Ref.
2018	"Pegajosa"	Herself	
2019	"Pam Pam"	Allen King	
2021	"Took a Minute"	Molly Burch	

=== Web series ===
Year	Title	Role	Notes	Ref.
2016	Cucu Confessions	Herself	Host	
2017	Whatcha Packin'	Herself	Guest	
2017	Cooking with Drag Queens	Herself	Guest	
2017	Queen to Queen	Herself	Guest, with Eureka O'Hara	
2018	Bootleg Opinions	Herself	Guest, hosted by Yuhua Hamasaki	
2020	Bring Back my Queens	Herself	Guest	
2020	Dragueando	Herself	Guest	
2023	Binge Queens: Drag Race Mexico	Herself	Host	

== Discography ==
=== Singles ===
Year	Title
2018	"Pegajosa"
