= Good Morning Bitches =

- RuPaul's Drag Race episode
- Episode no.: Season 9 Episode 4
- Presented by: RuPaul
- Original air date: April 14, 2017

Guest appearances
- Jeffrey Bowyer-Chapman; Naya Rivera

Episode chronology
← Previous "Draggily Ever After"	Next → "Reality Stars: The Musical"
- RuPaul's Drag Race season 9

"Good Morning Bitches" is the fourth episode of the ninth season of RuPaul's Drag Race. It originally aired on April 14, 2017. The episode's main challenge tasks the contestants with filming morning talk show segments in teams. Jeffrey Bowyer-Chapman and Naya Rivera are guest judges. Rivera also participants in the main challenge as the subject of celebrity interviews by the teams. Sasha Velour and Shea Couleé win the main challenge. Charlie Hides is eliminated from the competition after placing in the bottom and losing a lip-sync contest against Trinity Taylor to "I Wanna Go" (2011) by Britney Spears.

== Episode ==
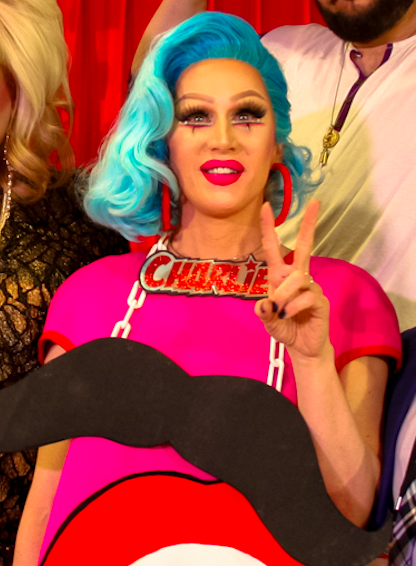
Charlie Hides (pictured at RuPaul's DragCon LA in 2017) is eliminated from the competition.

The contestants return to the workroom after Kimora Blac's elimination on the previous episode. Some of the contestants give Valentina a hard time for the praise she has been receiving from the judges during the competition. RuPaul greets the group and reveals the main challenge, which tasks the contestants with filming live morning talk show segments. Teams will co-host rival shows "Good Morning Bitches" and "Not on Today". For surviving the last lip-sync and winning the last challenge, respectively, Aja and Trinity Taylor are named captains and select their fellow teammates.

The groups start to brainstorm and rehearse in the workroom, then film on a set with Ross Mathews as the director. Alexis Michelle and Farrah Moan, Aja and Valentina, and Sasha Velour and Shea Couleé film segments in pairs for "Good Morning Bitches". Naya Rivera then joins the six for the celebrity interview segment. Peppermint and Trinity Taylor, Charlie Hides and Cynthia Lee Fontaine, and Eureka and Nina Bo'nina Brown film segments in pairs for "Not on Today". Rivera films a similar interview segment with the team. Charlie Hides abruptly and awkwardly ends the segment.

On elimination day, the contestants make final preparations in the workroom for the fashion show. Aja apologizes to Valentine for giving her a hard time. Charlie Hides and Cynthia Lee Fontaine talk about the impact of HIV/AIDS on the LGBTQ community. Eureka and Sasha Velour talk about eating disorders, sparking an argument. On the main stage, RuPaul welcomes fellow judges Michelle Visage and Matthews, as well as guest judges Jeffrey Bowyer-Chapman and Rivera. RuPaul shares the assignment and the runway category ("Naughty Nighties"), then the fashion show commences. RuPaul confirms that the judges have watched the talk show segments. Sasha Velour and Shea Couleé win the main challenge, and the rest of the team behind "Good Morning Bitches" are deemed safe. The judges deliver their critiques, then RuPaul asks the contestants to say who they think should be eliminated from the competition and why. The judges deliberate, then share the results with the group. Charlie Hides and Trinity Taylor place in the bottom and face off in a lip-sync contest to "I Wanna Go" (2011) by Britney Spears. Trinity Taylor wins the lip-sync and Charlie Hides is eliminated from the competition.

== Production and broadcast ==
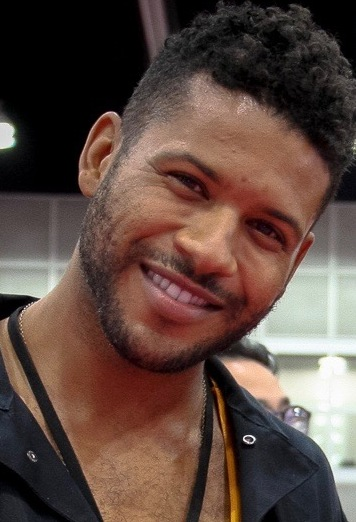
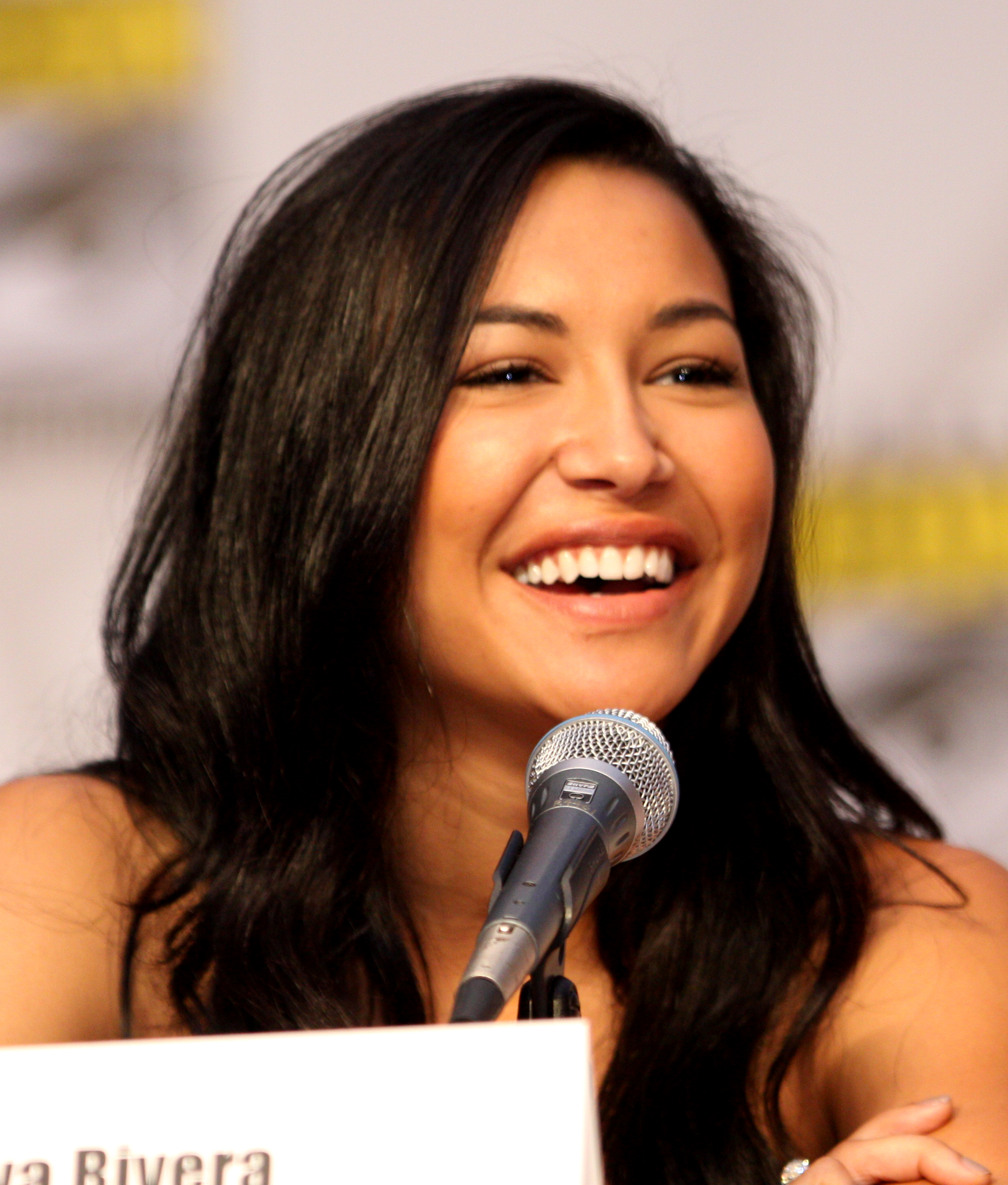
Jeffrey Bowyer-Chapman (left, pictured at RuPaul's DragCon LA in 2019) and Naya Rivera (right, pictured in 2010) are guest judges.

The episode originally aired on April 14, 2017.

Charlie Hides gave various reasons for why she did not try harder during the lip sync. Bryan Moylan of Vice News said Charlie Hides "just stood there, making weird motions" around the crotch area and wrote: "Meanwhile, Trinity worked the runway back and forth, whipping her hair around as Charlie floundered. It was sort of like a lip sync seppuku". Charlie Hides discussed the lip-sync performance on the subsequent episode "Reunited".

For the main stage, RuPaul wears a yellow dress and a large blonde wig. For the fashion show, some of the contestants wears nightgowns.

== Reception ==
Oliver Sava of The A.V. Club gave the episode a rating of 'C-'. Eric Henderson of Slant Magazine said Charlie Hides's "energy-zapped" performance "was among the worst Lip Sync For Your Life efforts in Drag Race history". Sam Brooks ranked the "I Wanna Go" contest number 85 in The Spinoff's 2019 "definitive ranking" of the show's lip-syncs to date, calling it: "An example of one queen killing it and one queen killing their chances of being remembered for anything else other than shrugging onstage for 90 seconds." Writers for Xtra Magazine described the contest a "botched" lip-sync. Bernardo Sim included Charlie Hides's performance in Pride.com's 2023 list of ten "legendary fails" on the show "that actually became iconic". Writing for Out magazine in 2024, Sim wrote, "Even though her fellow costars were screaming, 'Do something, Charlie!' Nothing was actually done by Charlie in her lip sync against Trinity The Tuck... Charlie was technically moving her mouth and standing in place, but can we really even consider that a lip sync?"
