= Your Pilot's on Fire =

- RuPaul's Drag Race episode
- Episode no.: Season 9 Episode 9
- Presented by: RuPaul
- Original air date: May 19, 2017

Guest appearances
- Lisa Robertson; Noah Galvin

Episode chronology
← Previous "RuPaul Roast"	Next → "Makeovers: Crew Better Work"
- RuPaul's Drag Race season 9

"Your Pilot's on Fire" is the ninth episode of the ninth season of the American television series RuPaul's Drag Race. It originally aired on May 19, 2017. The episode's main challenge tasks the contestants with pairing up and creating television pilots. Lisa Robertson and Noah Galvin are guest judges. Sasha Velour and Shea Couleé are both winners of the main challenge. Valentina is eliminated from the competition after placing in the bottom and losing a lip-sync contest against Nina Bo'nina Brown to "Greedy" by Ariana Grande.

== Episode ==
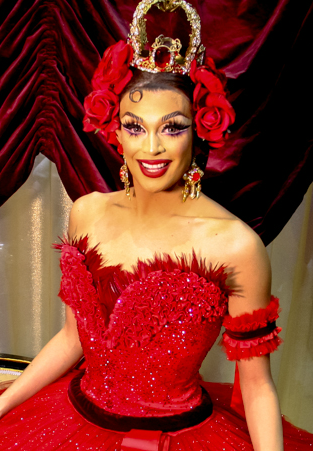
Valentina (pictured at RuPaul's DragCon LA in 2017) is eliminated from the competition.

The contestants return to the workroom after Farrah Moan's elimination on the previous episode. Nina Bo'nina Brown struggles to connect with her fellow contestants. On a new day, RuPaul greets the group and reveals the main challenge, which tasks the contestants with pairing up to create and perform in television pilots. Following are the self-selected teams:

- Teets & Asky – Sasha Velour and Shea Couleé
- Nina & Tina – Nina Bo'nina Brown and Valentina
- Mary, Mother of Gay – Alexis Michelle, Peppermint, and Trinity Taylor

The groups start to brainstorm and develop their concepts. Shea Couleé talks about her relationship with Nina Bo'nina Brown and needing some distance in order to stay focused on the competition. The contestants film in front of a green screen with assistance from Michelle Visage, Carson Kressley, and members of the Pit Crew.

On elimination day, the contestants make final preparations in the workroom for the fashion show. The Club Kids are a topic of discussion. On the main stage, RuPaul welcomes judges Visage and Kressley, as well as guest judges Lisa Robertson and Noah Galvin. RuPaul reveals the assignment and runway category ("Club Kid Couture"), then the fashion show commences. After the contestants present their looks, the judges and contestants watch the filmed television pilots. The judges deliver their critiques, deliberate, then share the results with the group. Peppermint, Sasha Velour, Shea Couleé, and Trinity Taylor receive positive critiques, and Sasha Velour and Shea Couleé are both winners of the challenge. Alexis Michelle, Nina Bo'nina Brown, and Valentina receive negative critiques, and Alexis Michelle is deemed safe. Nina Bo'nina Brown and Valentina place in the bottom and face off in a lip-sync contest to "Greedy" (2016) by Ariana Grande. Nina Bo'nina Brown wins the lip-sync and Valentina is eliminated from the competition.

== Production and broadcast ==
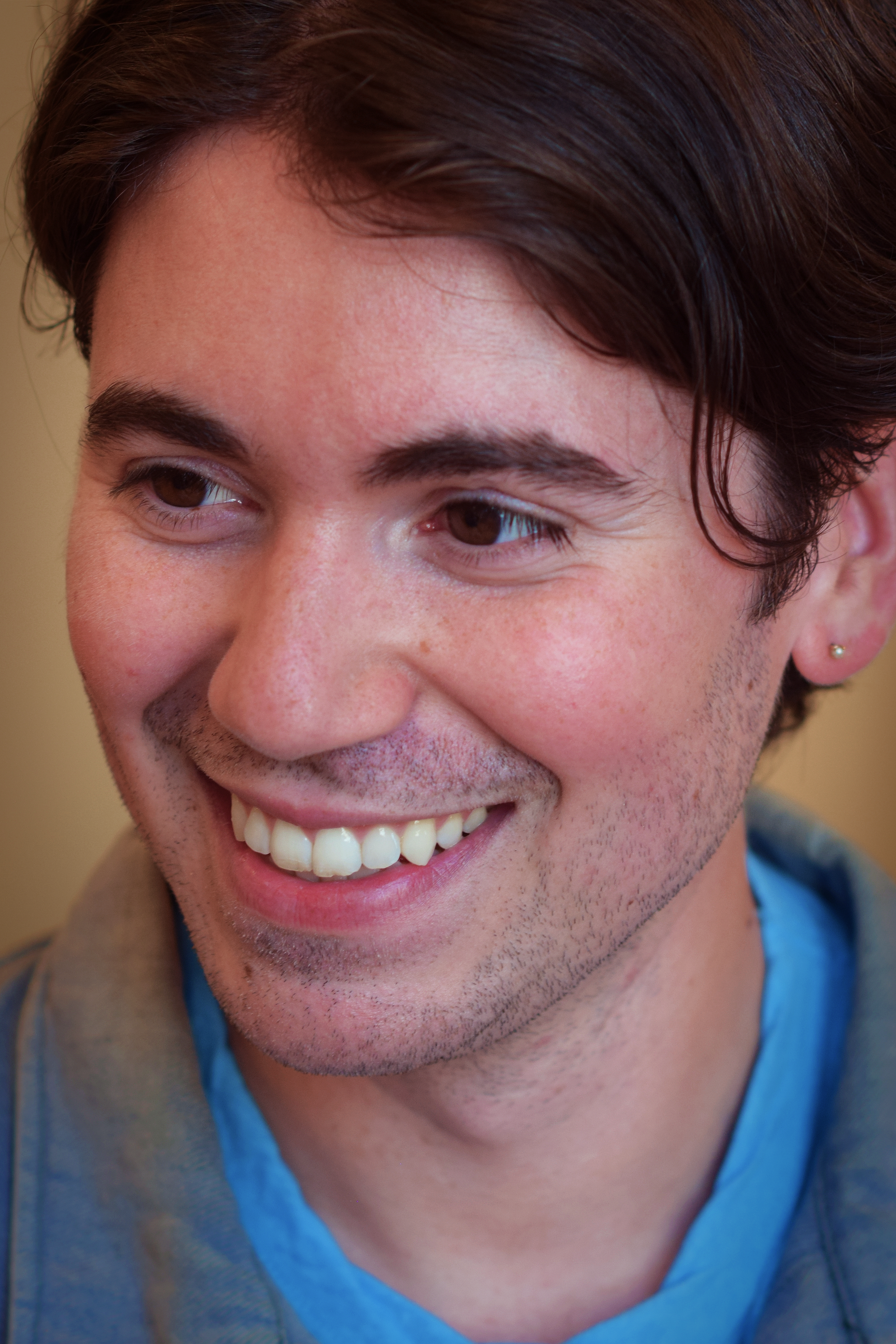
American actor and singer Noah Galvin (pictured in 2024) is a guest judge.

The episode originally aired on May 19, 2017.

In Mary, Mother of Gay, Trinity Taylor's character is a nun called Sister Mary Kuntz. Alexis Michelle and Peppermint portray mothers of gay sons, who are played by members of the Pit Crew. Shea Couleé and Sasha Velour are a spy duo in Teets & Asky. In Nina & Tina, Nina Bo'nina Brown and Valentina apply "cosmetics" in the form of food products such as pancake batter and peanut butter to each other.

Valentina does not know the lyrics to the lip-sync song "Greedy" and attempts to perform with her face mask kept on. RuPaul interrupts the performance and asks Valentina to remove her mask, prompting Valentina to say, "I'd like to keep it on, please." According to Bernardo Sim of Out magazine, "This dramatic Drag Race moment gained a new life during the lockdown of 2020, as it was included in numerous jokes about the (very real) need to wear a mask. Even Ru himself joked about it in an episode filmed during the lockdown, teasing that Valentina turned out to be right all along."

The contestants discussed the "Greedy" lip-sync and Valentina's performance on the season's reunion episode "Reunited".

=== Fashion ===
For their television pilot, Nina Bo'nina Brown and Valentina wear orange jumpsuits. For the fashion show, Sasha Velour wears a blue-and-pink clown-inspired outfit with a tall cone-shaped headpiece. Shea Couleé has a colorful outfit when a mouth on the front. She has tall red boots and a mask over her face. Nina Bo'nina Brown has a black-and-pink skeleton-inspired outfit. Valentina has a red matador-inspired outfit. She also has tall red boots and a face mask. Trinity Taylor has a colorful outfit with a short purple wig. Peppermint has a red-and-white candy-inspired outfit with a black corset. Alexis Michelle has a black outfit and black-and-white makeup on her face.

== Reception and legacy ==
Oliver Sava of The A.V. Club gave the episode a rating of 'A'. Writing for Vulture, Joel Kim Booster rated the episode five out of five stars. In 2018, Consequence said the elimination was "truly shocking". In 2020, Andy Swift of TVLine said Valentina's plea "instantly cemented her place in Drag Race herstory". In 2023, Glenn Rowley of Billboard called Valentina's plea an "epic moment" on the show. Bernardo Sim included the "I'd like to keep it on, please" meme in Out's 2025 list of the 32 "best and most hilarious" memes in the show's history. In 2025, IN Magazine called the lip-sync "one of the season's most memorable" and Charlie Duncan of PinkNews called Valentina's plea "infamous". Maxwell Burnstein of the fashion magazine Paper also said Valentina's plea was "infamous" in 2018.

Trinity Taylor returned to her Sister Mary Kuntz character for Trinity Ruins Christmas: The Musical.
