= Snatch Game (RuPaul's Drag Race season 9) =

- RuPaul's Drag Race episode
- Episode no.: Season 9 Episode 6
- Presented by: RuPaul
- Original air date: April 28, 2017

Guest appearances
- Candice Cayne; Denis O'Hare

Episode chronology
← Previous "Reality Stars: The Musical"	Next → "9021-HO"
- RuPaul's Drag Race season 9

"Snatch Game" is the sixth episode of the ninth season of the American television series RuPaul's Drag Race. It originally aired on April 28, 2017. The episode's main challenge tasks the contestants with impersonating celebrities in the Snatch Game. Candis Cayne and Denis O'Hare are guests. Alexis Michelle wins the episode's main challenge. Cynthia Lee Fontaine is eliminated from the competition after placing in the bottom and losing a lip-sync contest against Peppermint to "Music" by Madonna.

== Episode ==
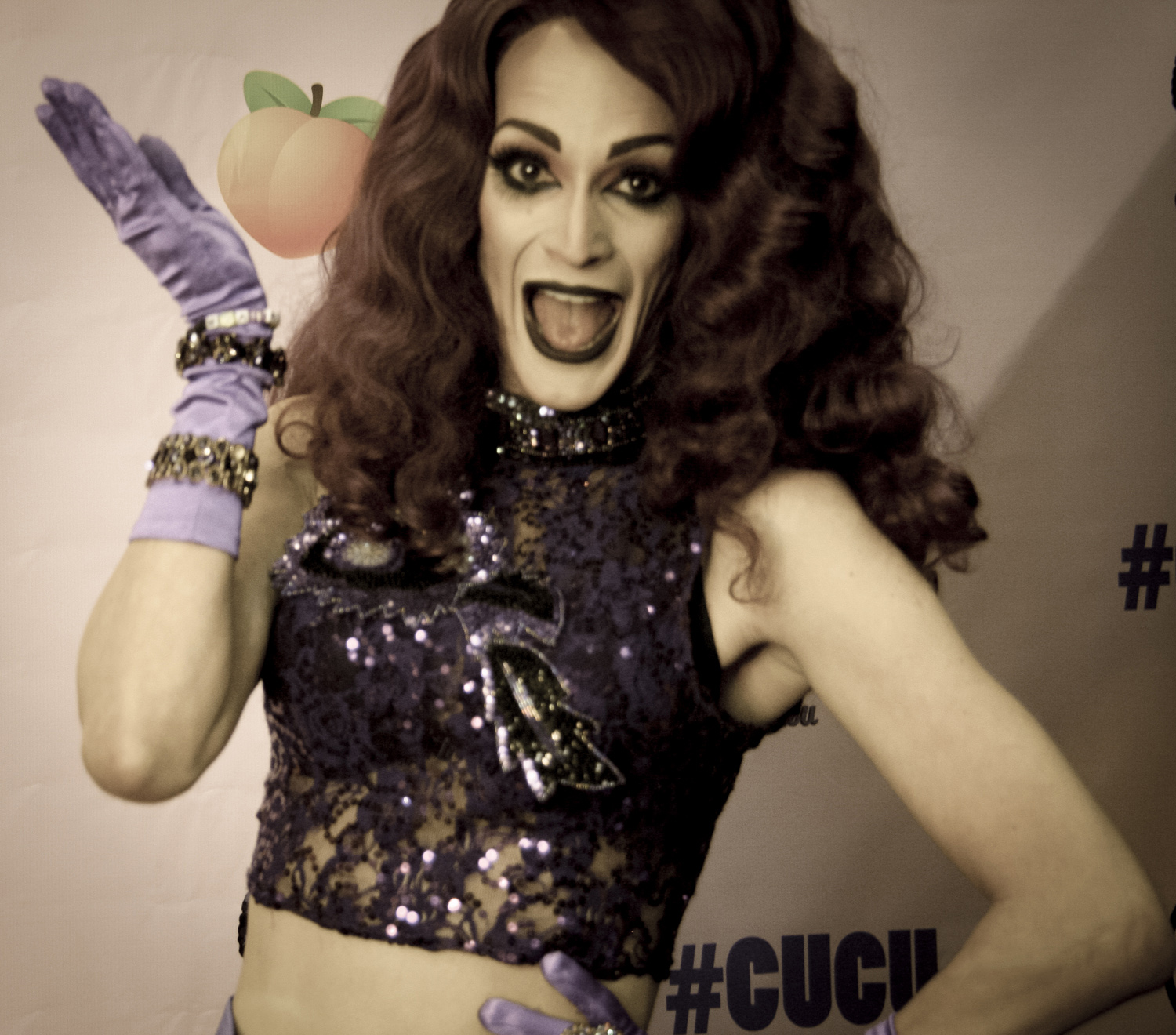
Cynthia Lee Fontaine (pictured in 2017) is eliminated from the competition.

For this week's main challenge, the contestants play the Snatch Game. Candis Cayne and Denis O'Hare star as the celebrity guests. Following are the contestants and impersonated celebrities:

- Aja as Alyssa Edwards
- Alexis Michelle as Liza Minnelli
- Cynthia Lee Fontaine as Sofia Vergara
- Farrah Moan as Gigi Gorgeous
- Nina Bo'nina Brown as Jasmine Masters
- Peppermint as NeNe Leakes
- Sasha Velour as Marlene Dietrich
- Shea Couleé as Naomi Campbell
- Trinity Taylor as Amanda Lepore
- Valentina as Ariadna Gutiérrez

The runway category is "Night of a Thousand Madonna's", a repeat from season 8's Snatch Game runway theme. The judges deliver their critiques, deliberate, then share the results with the contestants. Alexis Michelle wins the main challenge. Cynthia Lee Fontaine and Peppermint place in the bottom and face off in a lip-sync contest to "Music" by Madonna. Peppermint wins the lip-sync and Cynthia Lee Fontaine is eliminated from the competition.

== Production and broadcast ==
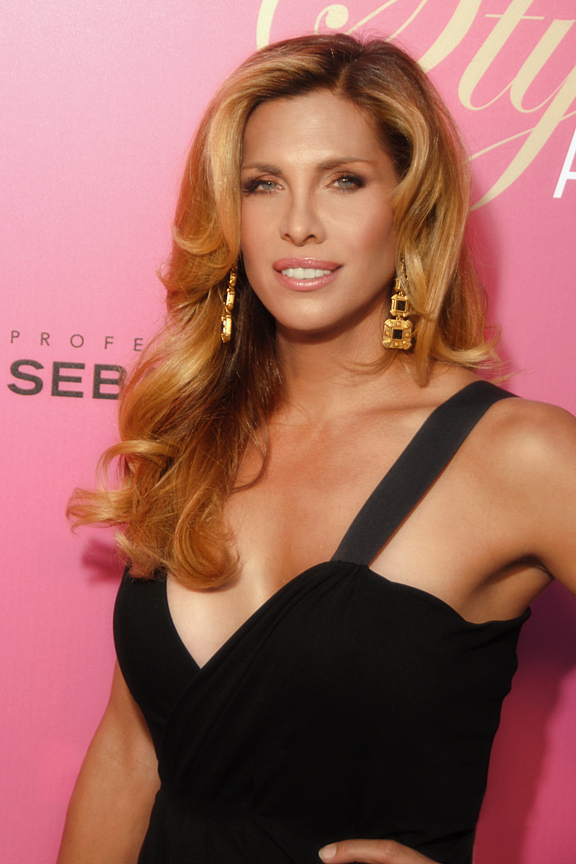
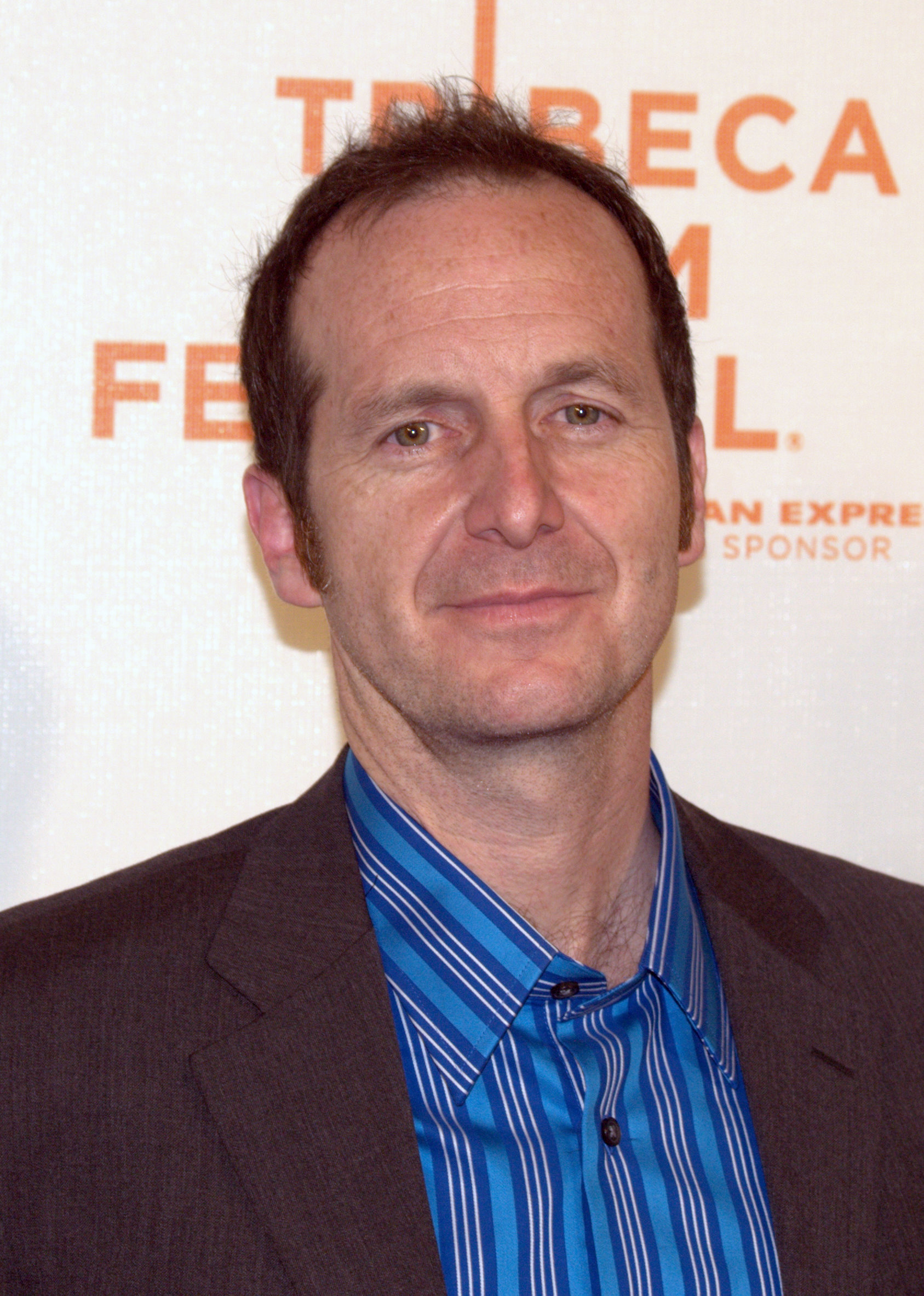
Candis Cayne (left); Denis O'Hare (right)

The episode originally aired on April 28, 2017.

=== Fashion ===
For the fashion show, Peppermint and Shea Couleé present looks based on the "Material Girl" music video, while Nina Bo'nina Brown and Trinity Taylor present looks based on Madonna's 2013 Met Gala red carpet look. Aja's look is based on the Who's That Girl World Tour. Alexis Michelle's look is based on Breathless Mahoney from Dick Tracey. Sasha Velour's look is based on the "Erotica" music video. Farrah Moan's look is based on the Super Bowl XLVI halftime show. Cynthia Lee Fontaine's look is based on Madonna's 2015 Brit Awards red carpet look. Valentina's look is inspired by Sex.

== Reception ==
Writing for Vulture, Joel Kim Booster rated the episode three out of five stars.

== See also ==
- Cultural impact of Madonna
