= Reality Stars: The Musical =

- RuPaul's Drag Race episode
- Episode no.: Season 9 Episode 5
- Original air date: April 21, 2017

Guest appearances
- Todrick Hall (guest judge and choreographer); Meghan Trainor (guest judge); Chester Lockhart (assistant choreographer)

Episode chronology
← Previous "Good Morning Bitches"	Next → "Snatch Game"

"Reality Stars: The Musical" is the fifth episode of the ninth season of the American reality competition television series RuPaul's Drag Race, which aired on VH1 on April 21, 2017. The episode's main challenge tasks the contestants with performing a Hamilton-inspired Rusical (musical theatre production) about the Kardashian family and other celebrities.

Todrick Hall and Meghan Trainor are guest judges, alongside regular panelists RuPaul, Michelle Visage, and Carson Kressley. Chester Lockhart also makes a guest appearance to assist the contestants with choreography. While she does not place in the bottom of the main challenge, Eureka is eliminated from the competition because of an injury resulting from a main challenge involving cheerleading on a previous episode.

== Episode ==
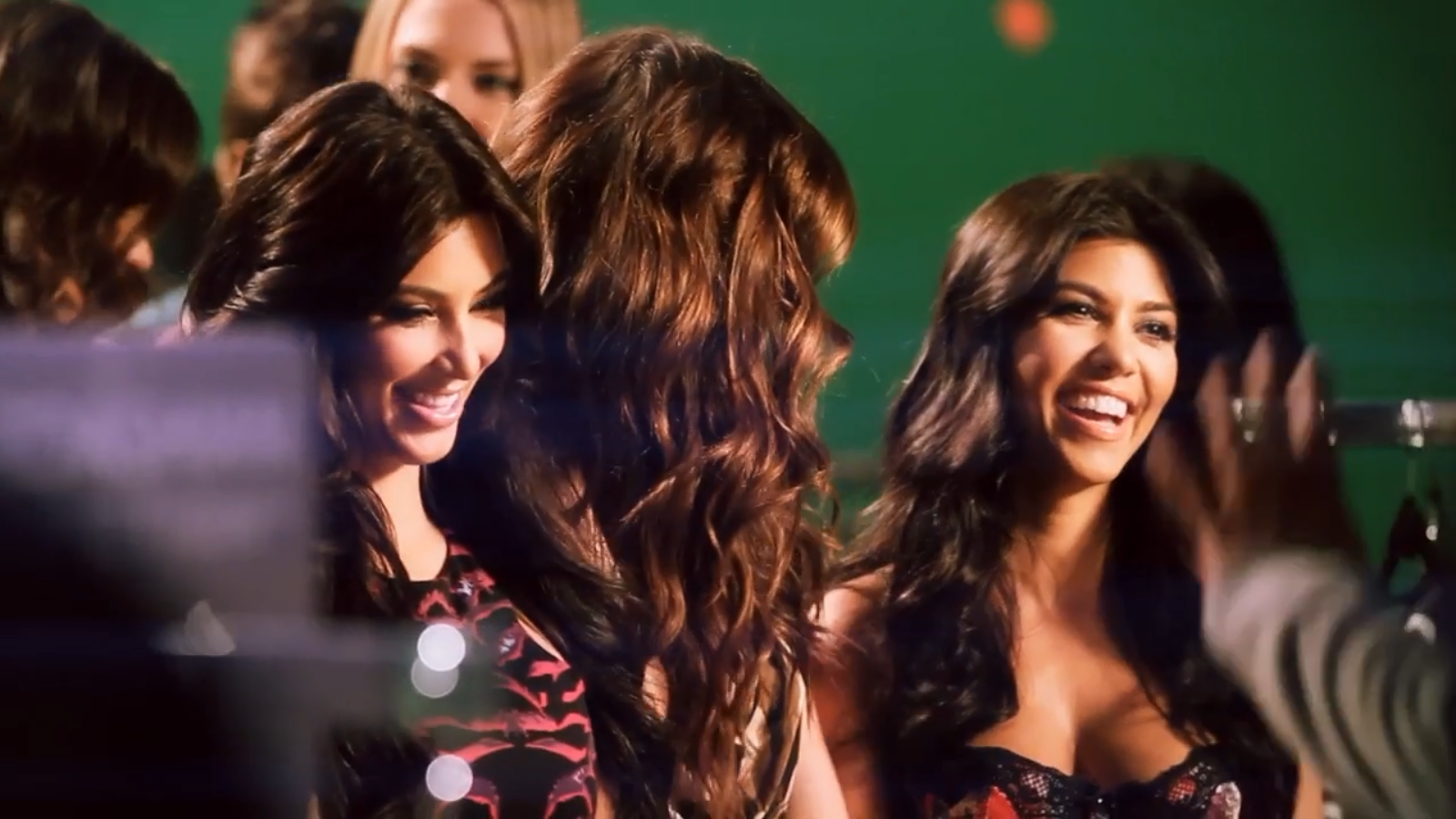
In the Rusical, Kim, Khloe, and Kourtney Kardashian (pictured in 2013) are portrayed by Cynthia Lee Fontaine, Nina Bo'nina Brown, and Aja, respectively.

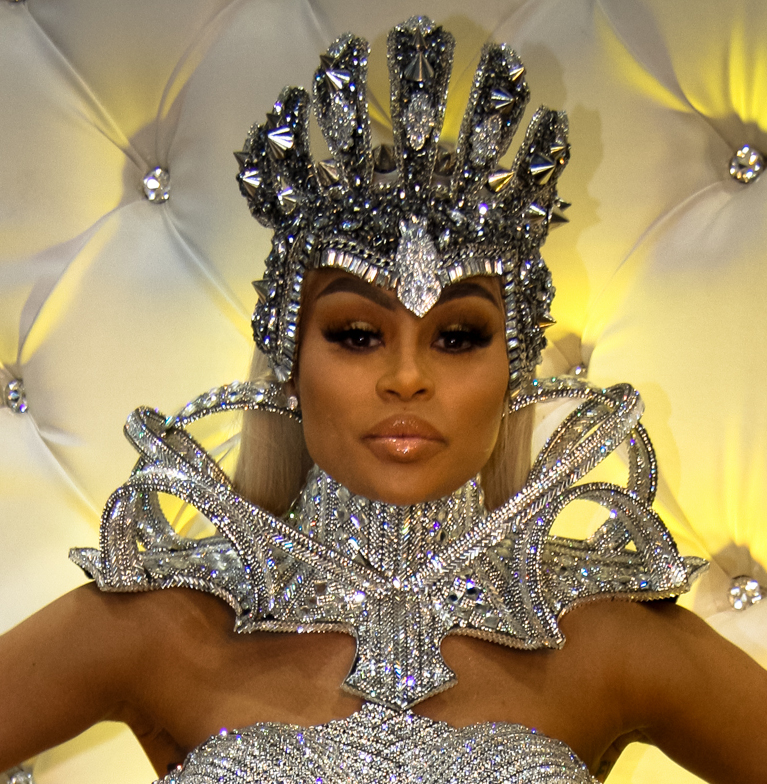
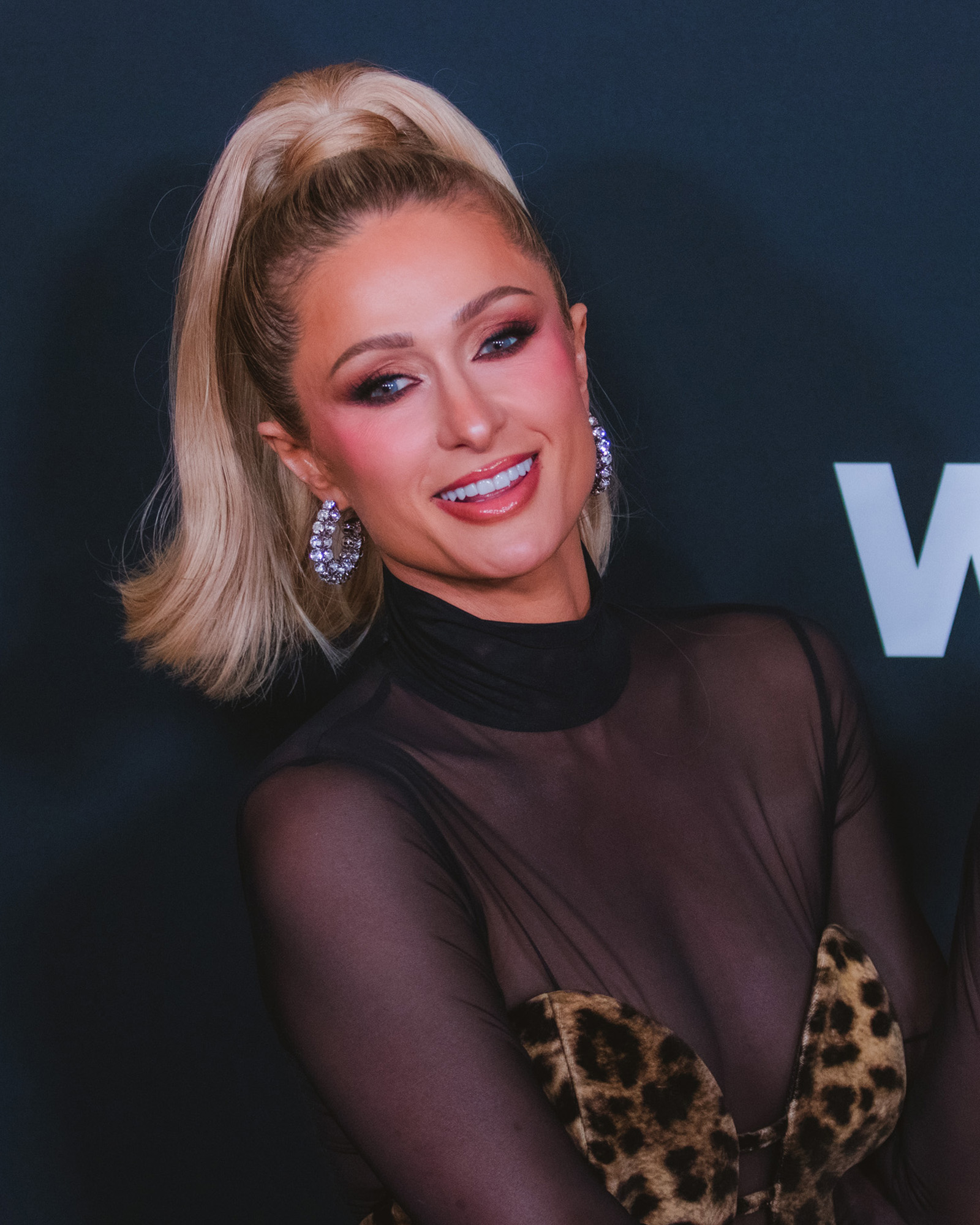
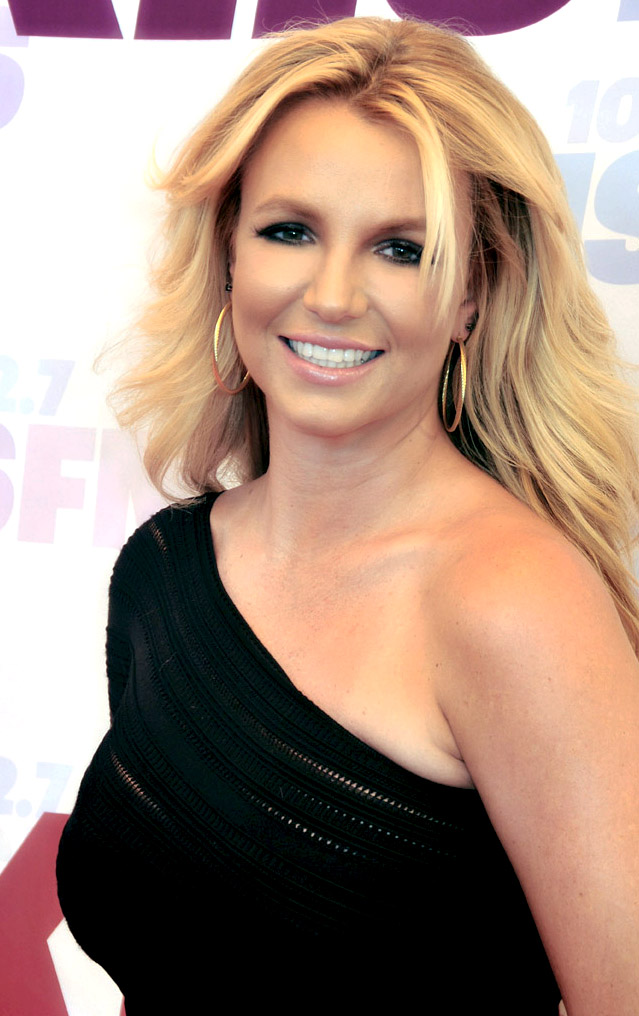
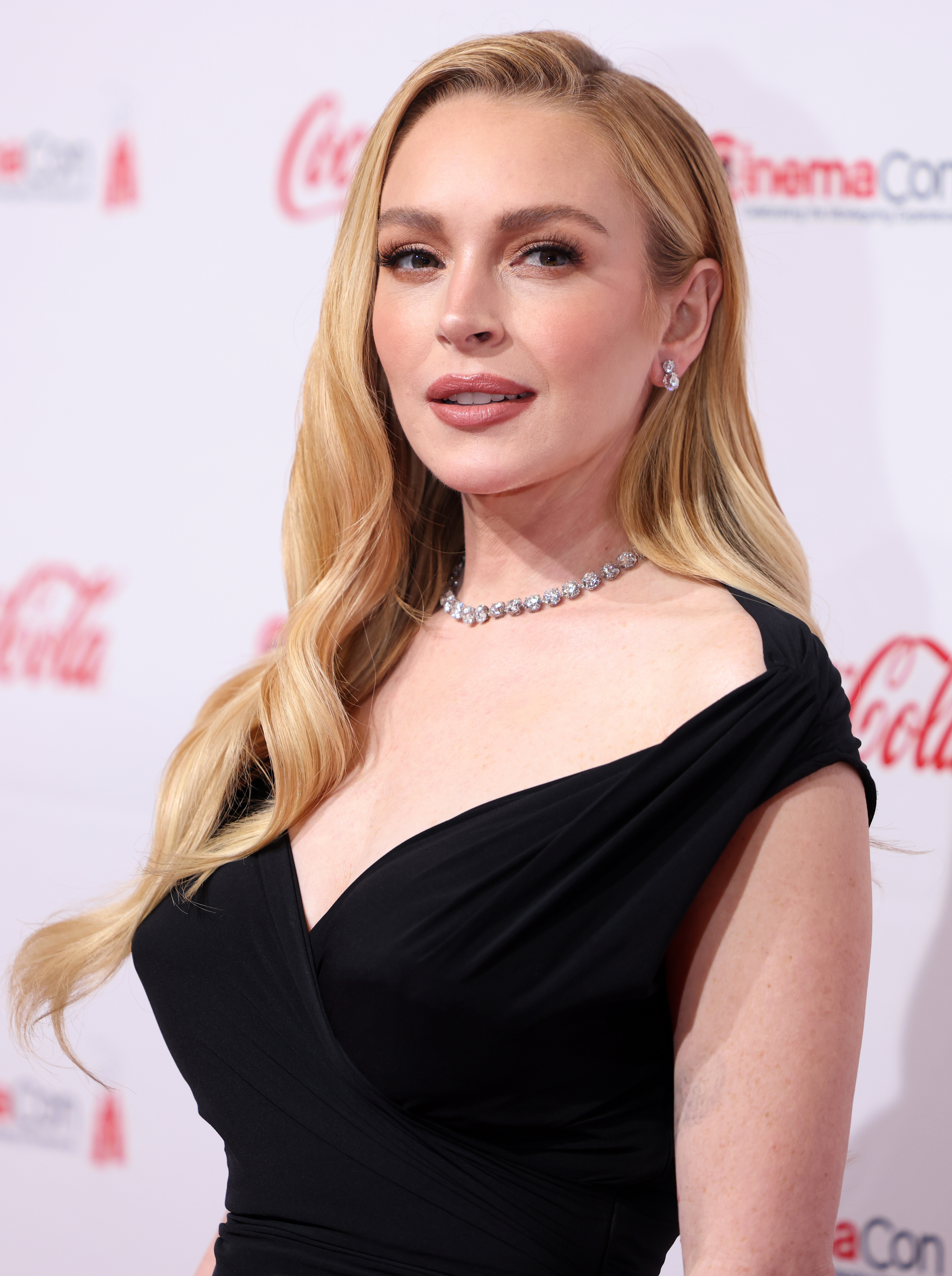
Shea Couleé, Trinity Taylor, Sasha Velour, and Peppermint portray (pictured clockwise) Blac Chyna, Paris Hilton, Lindsay Lohan, and Britney Spears, respectively.

The contestants return to the workroom after Charlie Hides's elimination on the previous episode. On a new day, RuPaul greets the group and reveals the mini-challenge, which tasks the contestants with posing in "sexy" selfies with members of the Pit Crew. Alexis Michelle wins the mini-challenge. RuPaul then reveals the main challenge, which tasks the contestants with performing in a Hamilton-inspired lip sync Rusical (musical theatre production) about the Kardashian family and other celebrities called "Kardashian: The Musical". As the winner of the mini-challenge, Alexis Michelle gets to assign the roles. The contestants listen to the musical, then share their preferred roles. Alexis Michelle assigns the following cast:

- Aja plays Kourtney Kardashian
- Alexis Michelle plays Kris Jenner
- Cynthia Lee Fontaine plays Kim Kardashian
- Eureka plays North West
- Farrah Moan plays Kylie Jenner
- Nina Bo'nina Brown plays Khloé Kardashian
- Peppermint plays Britney Spears
- Sasha Velour plays Lindsay Lohan
- Shea Couleé plays Blac Chyna
- Trinity Taylor plays Paris Hilton
- Valentina plays Kendall Jenner

The contestants begin to practice in the workroom, then rehearse choreography with Todrick Hall and assistant Chester Lockhart on the main stage. Nina Bo'nina Brown shares her disappointment with not getting her preferred role. On elimination day, the contestants make final preparations in the workroom for the musical and fashion show. Eureka apologizes to Sasha Velour and Valentina for comments she made previously about eating disorders. Sasha Velour, Valentina, and Shea Couleé each talk about their experiences with eating disorders.

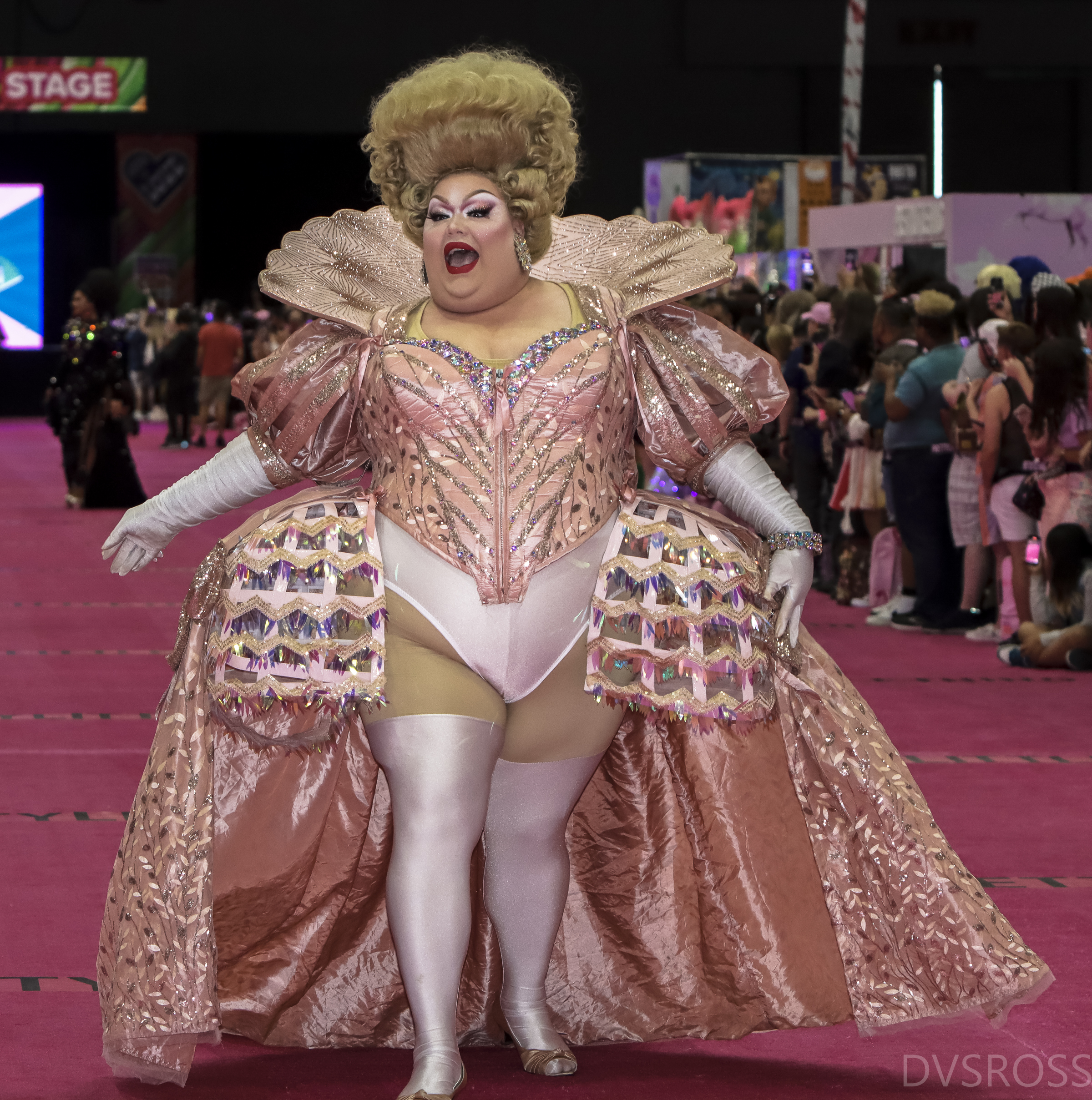
Eureka (pictured at RuPaul's DragCon LA in 2022) is eliminated from the competition because of an injury.

On the main stage, RuPaul welcomes fellow judges Michelle Visage and Carson Kressley, as well as guest judges Hall and Meghan Trainor. RuPaul reveals the assignment, then the Rusical commences. RuPaul reveals the theme for the runway ("Faux Fur Fabulous"), then the contestants present their runway looks. Aja, Eureka, Sasha Velour, Trinity Taylor, and Valentina are declared safe. The judges deliver their critiques, deliberate, then share the results with the group. Shea Couleé is declared the winner of the main challenge. Cynthia Lee Fontaine, Farrah Moan, and Nina Bo'Nina Brown are criticized for their performances. Nina Bo'Nina Brown is declared safe. Cynthia Lee Fontaine and Farrah Moan place in the bottom and face off in a lip-sync contest to Trainor's song "Woman Up". Unexpectedly, RuPaul eliminates Eureka from the competition due to an injury that occurred in the second episode's cheerleading challenge; as a result, Cynthia Lee Fontaine and Farrah Moan are declared safe from elimination.

== Production and broadcast ==
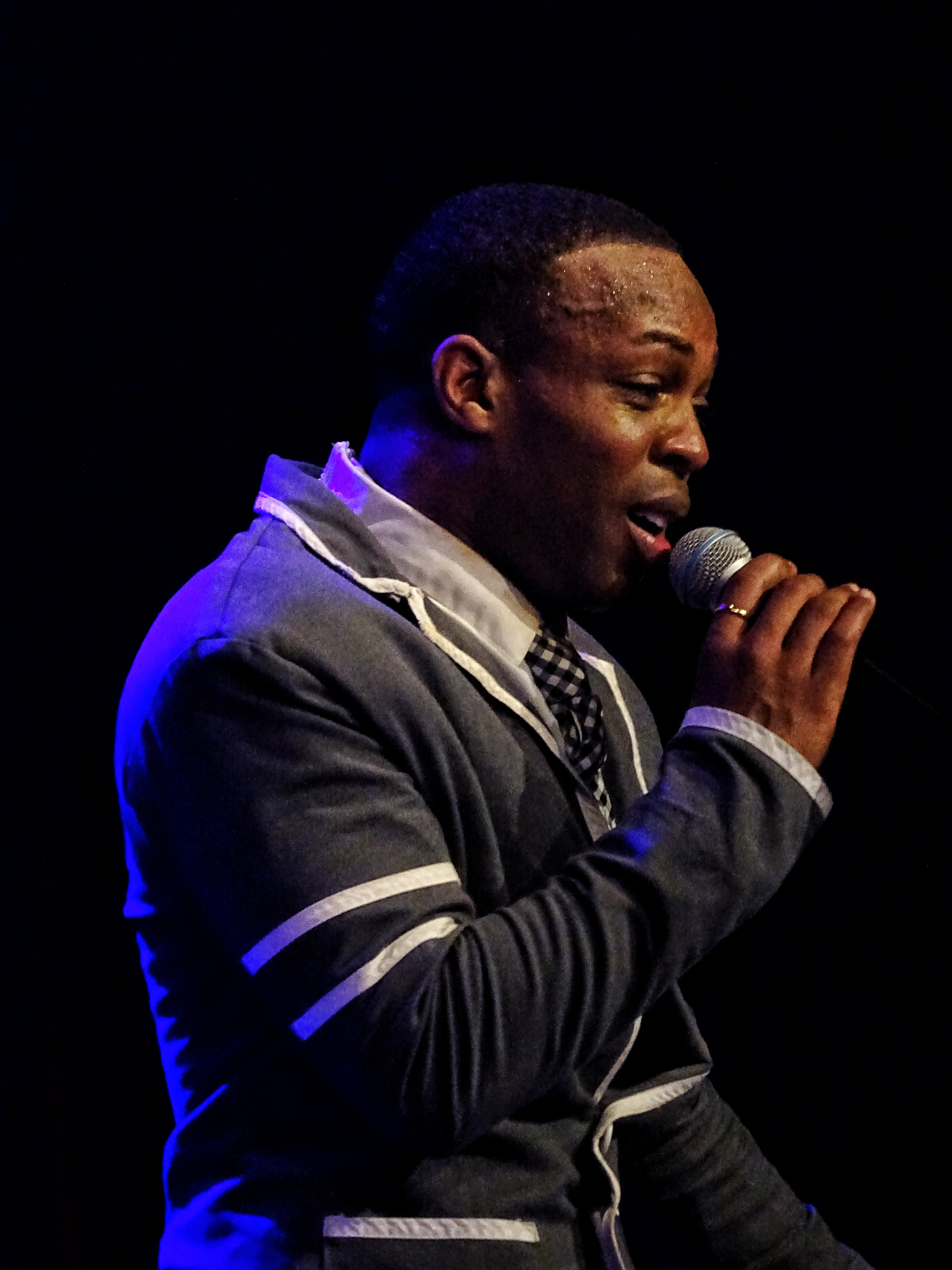
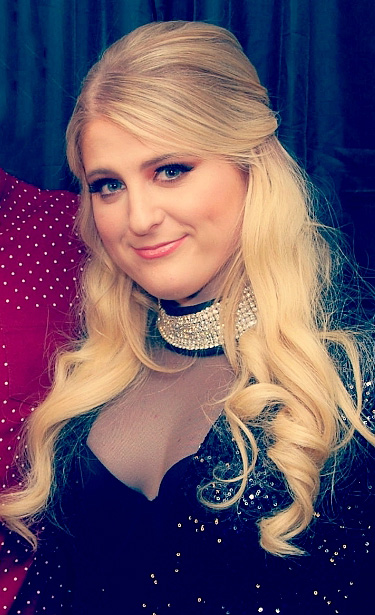
Todrick Hall (left) and Meghan Trainor (right) served as guest judges.

The episode originally aired on April 21, 2017.

=== Fashion ===
Trainor wears a unicorn onesie. For the fashion show, Peppermint wears a pink outfit and pink wig. Sasha Velour has a Russia-inspired outfit with a red bottom and a black hat. Alexis Michelle has a mink coat. Cynthia Lee Fontaine's outfit has a snow leopard print and she wears tall black boots. Nina Bo'nina Brown has a purple outfit and a blonde wig. Aja has a winter-inspired outfit. Valentina's outfit has a snakeskin print. Farrah Moan wears a green jacket and a red wig. Shea Coulee has tall blue boots. Eureka has a mostly pink outfit and a pink wig.

== Reception ==
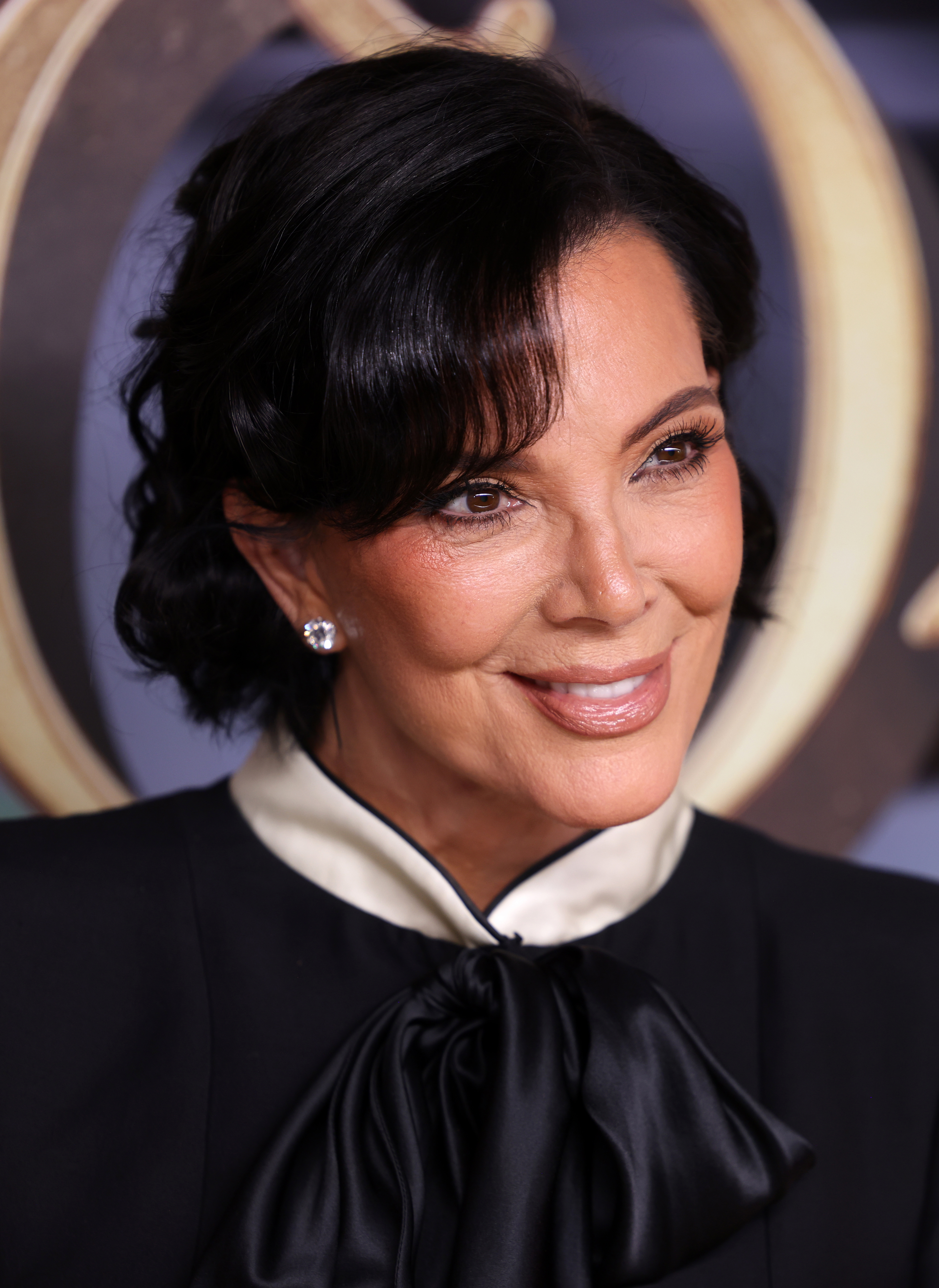
Kris Jenner (pictured in 2025) praised Alexis Michelle for her impersonation in the Rusical.

Oliva Sava of The A.V. Club gave the episode a rating of 'B+'. Writing for Vulture, Joel Kim Booster rated the episode three out of five stars. Joyce Chen of Us Weekly said Shea Couleé "stole the show" with her performance and portrayal of Blac Chyna. Kris Jenner has praised the episode and Alexis Michelle's impression of her. In 2018, In magazine's Bianca Guzzo ranked "Kardashian: The Musical" number seven on her "definitive ranking of all the musicals" on the series. Bernardo Sim included the musical in Screen Rant's 2020 overview of the best Rusicals to date. Sim described "Kardashian: The Musical" as "a hilarious musical full of great performances and creative ideas". The website's Min Ji Park included Trainor in a 2022 list of the show's ten worst guest judges, according to Reddit.

Kevin O'Keeffe included the "Woman Up" performance number 122 in INTO Magazine's 2018 "definitive ranking" of the show's lip-sync contests to date. Sam Brooks also ranked the performance number 122 in The Spinoff's 2019 "definitive ranking" of the show's 162 lip-syncs to date. Jake Pitre included "Woman Up" in Out magazine's 2018 list of twelve lip-syncs that "define" the show's "queer canon", writing: "Sometimes, Drag Race tries to take a new song by a new artist and turn it into an iconic moment. Sometimes, it fails utterly, as with guest judge Meghan Trainor and her song, "Woman Up". Beyond the glaringly obvious lyrical connection to drag, this song is an absolute bore. The luxury of being a guest judge is that you get your song performed, but it was clear that this was dead on arrival, and there was nothing Farrah Moan or Cynthia Lee Fontaine could do to change that."
