= Reunited (RuPaul's Drag Race season 9) =

- RuPaul's Drag Race episode
- Episode no.: Season 9 Episode 13
- Presented by: RuPaul
- Original air date: June 16, 2017

Guest appearance
- Kris Jenner

Episode chronology
- RuPaul's Drag Race season 9

"Reunited" is the thirteenth episode of the ninth season of the American television series RuPaul's Drag Race. It originally aired on June 16, 2017. The episode sees the season's contestants reunite and discuss various topics moderated by RuPaul. Kris Jenner makes a guest appearance on video to compliment Alexis Michelle for her impersonation. Valentina is named the season's "Fan Favorite", a title adapted from Miss Congeniality by the contestants.

== Episode ==
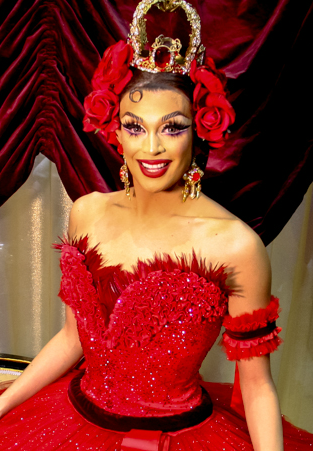
Valentina (pictured in 2017) is named "Fan Favorite", a title adapted from Miss Congeniality by the season's contestants.

RuPaul and the season's contestants participate in a reunion at the Alex Theatre. Various scenes of the contestants "reading" (throwing shade, or playfully insulting each other) are shown. Alexis Michelle discusses being uncomfortable with her fellow contestants discussing her body size. RuPaul then declares "the library is open" and the contestants share insults.

The group discuss Charlie Hides's lip-sync. Charlie Hides offers multiple reasons for her performance, including an injury during the cheerleading challenge, her decision to mimic masturbation, and a lack of energy. The group then discuss Eureka's injury and removal from the competition. Farrah Moan re-enacts her reaction to Eureka's elimination. Eureka and Trinity Taylor discuss their relationship. The contestants talk about Valentina's elimination and how her fans treated Nina Bo'nina Brown as a result of the contest. A scene of Aja fighting with Valentina on Untucked is shown, then a clip of the song "Linda Evangelista" by Adam Joseph (a "bitch track" remix of Aja's comments) is played.

The group discuss Nina Bo'nina Brown and her fear of sabotage by her fellow contestants. A video is shown of Kris Jenner complimenting Alexis Michelle's impersonation. A montage follows of the contestants sharing their opinions of looks presented by others. Another montage highlights unseen footage of some of the season's guest judges. The contestants then vote "toot" (good) or "boot" (bad) at some of the looks presenting by contestants on the runway.

RuPaul invites previous recipient Cynthia Lee Fontaine to reveal that fans voted Valentina as Miss Congeniality, earning her a prize of $5,000. After Valentina's speech, Aja questions the appropriateness of the title and Farrah Moan and Valentina discuss the status of their friendship. The contestants rename the title "Fan Favorite". Trinity Taylor gives praise to Valentina for her ability to earn the favor of fans. RuPaul promotes the finale episode and thanks the contestants for participating in the competition.

== Production and broadcast ==
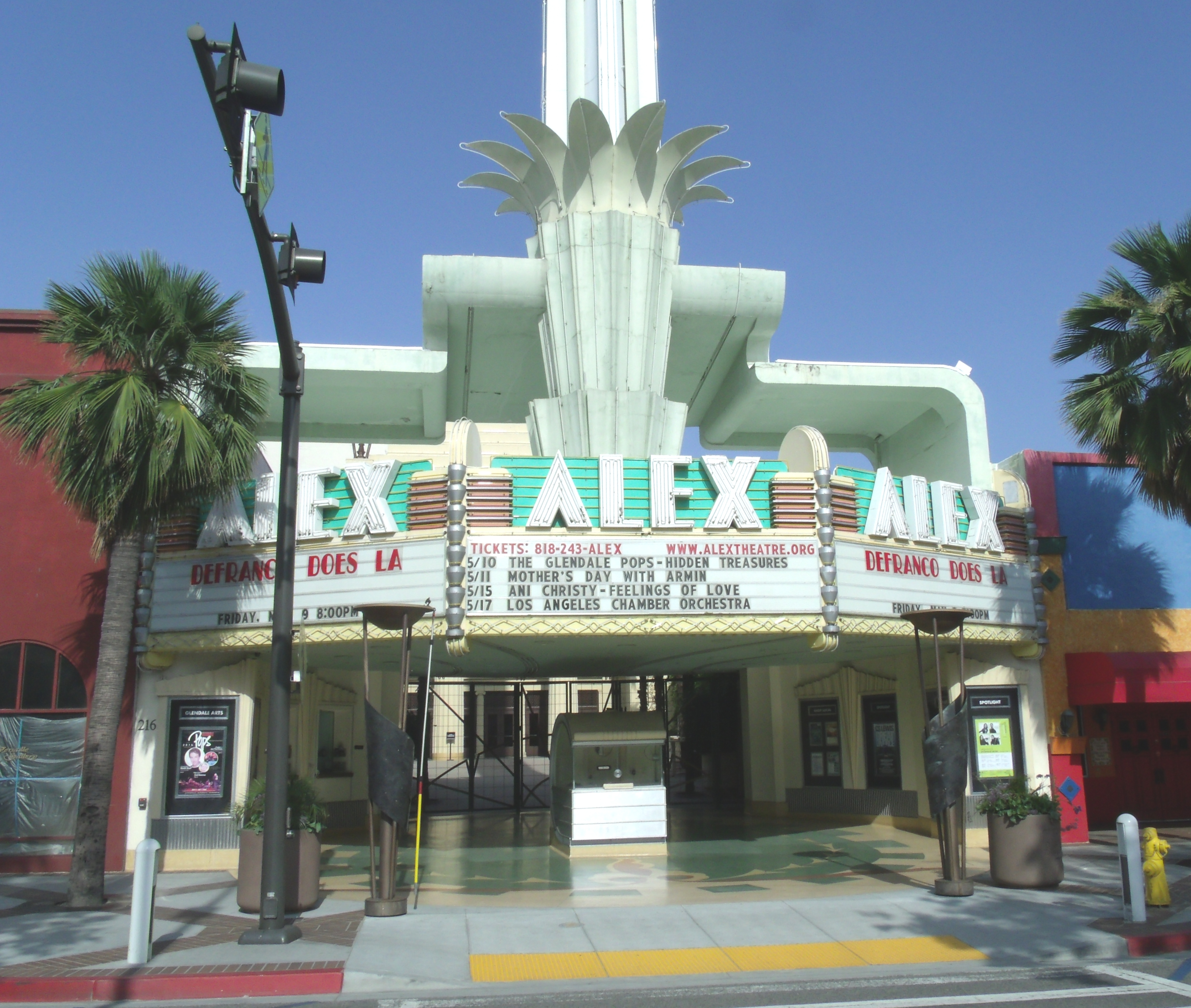
The episode was filmed at the Alex Theatre (exterior pictured in 2014) in Glendale, California.

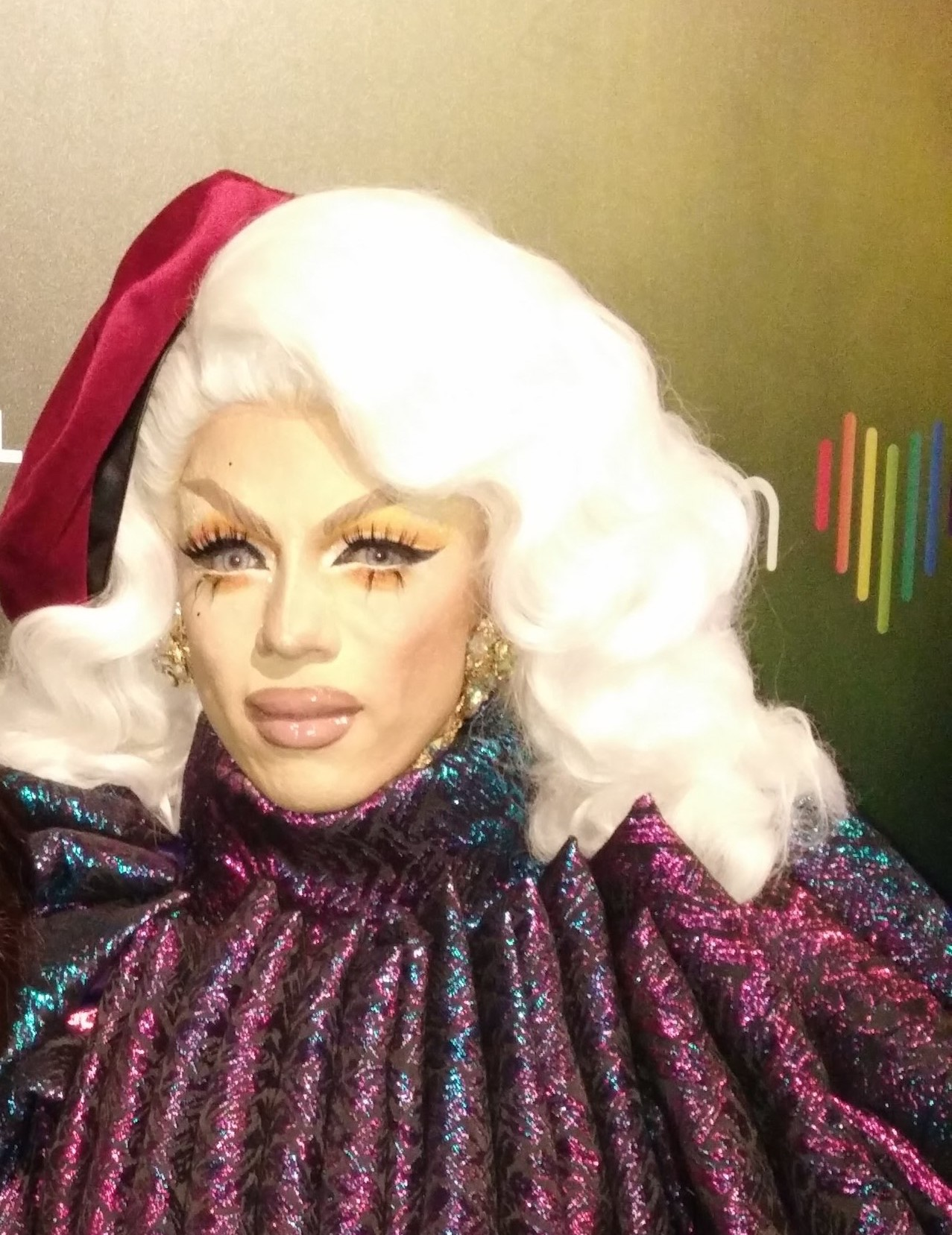
During the episode, Aja (pictured in 2018) speaks out against Valentina being voted Miss Congeniality by fans.

Filmed at the Alex Theatre in Glendale, California, the episode originally aired on June 16, 2017.

Michael Cuby of Them magazine said, "At her season’s reunion and finale, it’s safe to say Valentina anticipated call-outs from some of the other queens. But she made sure she didn’t break a sweat." Aja has recalled:

I told [Valentina], 'If you win Miss Congeniality, I'm gonna [say something],' and she said ok. She didn't give a s–t… she did not care. I know Valentina. Oddly, me and Valentina didn't get along on the show. That was real. But, after the show, Valentina and I became pretty great friends. I do love her as a person, I just don't think she's nice. So, when the award of being nice came into play, I was like, no, you're not nice. But there's nothing wrong with not being nice. There's nothing wrong with not being congenial. It wasn't supposed to be an attack, it was more of like, hey, you're family, let's call this what it is. It's just not fair to award someone an award for being nice when there are other people like Peppermint, who'd been extremely nurturing and nice, and even Trinity — people who really gave to all of us.

According to Caroline Framke of Vox, "After the reunion aired, Valentina asked her fans to put rose emojis on the other queens' Instagrams as a sign of goodwill ... but some may have found to be more passive-aggressive than genuinely affectionate." In 2018, Ryan Shea of Instinct said the episode is among the only instances in which the "toxicity" of the show's fan base is discussed.

== Reception ==
Oliver Sava of The A.V. Club gave the episode a rating of 'A'. Writing for Vulture, Joel Kim Booster rated the episode four out of five stars. Stephen Daw ranked the playing of "Linda Evangelista" number 35 in Billboard's 2018 list of the show's 50 best "musical moments". Jake Viswanath included "You don't love me" in Bustle's 2021 list of five "dramatic" reunion moments "that left us gooped and gagged". Amaya Lynch included Farrah Moan saying "Let's make a round of applause for the fan favorite" and "You don't love me", as well as Shea Couleé asking "Do I look upset to you?", in Screen Rant's 2022 list of the ten "shadiest reunion episode quotes". Lynch opined, "The cast of season 9 was filled with some of the strongest queens on Drag Race, which made for a competitive season and one of the best reunion episodes." Bernardo Sim included Aja's questioning of Valentina being voted Miss Congeniality in Out magazine's 2022 list of the show's eight "most memorable" reunion moments to date.
