= RuPaul's Drag Race season 9 =

2017 season of RuPaul's Drag Race

RuPaul's Drag Race
- Season 9
- Promotional poster for season nine
- Hosted by: RuPaul
- Judges: RuPaul; Michelle Visage; Carson Kressley; Ross Mathews
- No. of contestants: 14
- Winner: Sasha Velour
- Runner-up: Peppermint
- Miss Congeniality: Valentina
- Companion show: RuPaul's Drag Race: Untucked!
- No. of episodes: 14

Release
- Original network: VH1
- Original release: March 24 – June 23, 2017

Season chronology
- ← Previous; Season 8 Next → Season 10

The ninth season of RuPaul's Drag Race began airing on March 24, 2017, on VH1. The returning judges included RuPaul, Michelle Visage, Ross Mathews and Carson Kressley. Fourteen drag queens (including one returnee) competed for the title of "America's Next Drag Superstar". The prizes for the winner are a one-year supply of Anastasia Beverly Hills cosmetics, a cash prize of $100,000, and a crown and scepter provided by Shandar. The full list of contestants was revealed on February 2, 2017. This season saw the return of season eight contestant Cynthia Lee Fontaine, who finished the competition in 10th place.

This season featured 14 new queens and the winner of the ninth season of RuPaul's Drag Race was Sasha Velour, with Peppermint being the runner-up and Valentina winning Miss Congeniality.

== Production ==
Bob the Drag Queen revealed on her Sibling Watchery podcast that season 9 started filming one week after the season 8 finale.

== Contestants ==
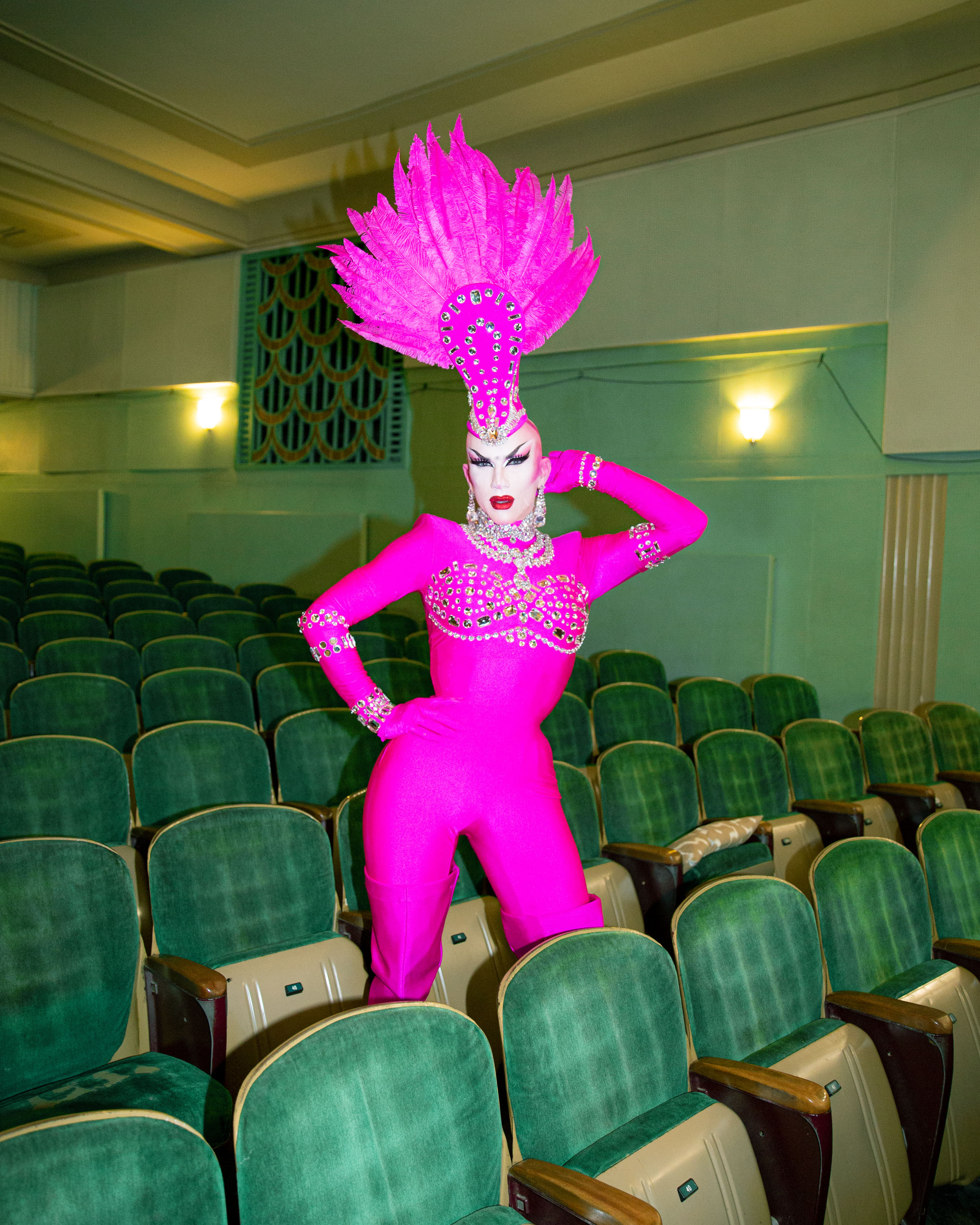
The winner, Sasha Velour

Ages, names, and cities stated are at time of filming.

Contestants of RuPaul's Drag Race season 9 and their backgrounds
Contestant	Age	Hometown	Outcome
Sasha Velour	29	Brooklyn, New York	Winner
Peppermint (Note: Miss Peppermint is referred to as Peppermint on the show.)	37	New York City, New York	Runner-up
Shea Couleé	27	Chicago, Illinois	3rd place
Trinity Taylor (Note: Now Trinity the Tuck, she was referred to as Trinity Taylor on the show.)	31	Orlando, Florida	3rd place
Alexis Michelle	32	New York City, New York	5th place
Nina Bo'nina Brown	34	Riverdale, Georgia	6th place
Valentina	25	Echo Park, Los Angeles, California	7th place (Note: Valentina was voted Miss Congeniality by the viewers.)
Farrah Moan	23	Las Vegas, Nevada	8th place
Aja (Note: Aja Miyake-Mugler, formerly known as Aja LaBeija, is referred to as Aja on the show.)	22	Brooklyn, New York	9th place
Cynthia Lee Fontaine (Note: Cynthia previously competed on season 8, placing tenth.)	35	Austin, Texas	10th place
Eureka (Note: Eureka O'Hara is referred to as Eureka on the show.)	25	Johnson City, Tennessee	11th place (Note: Eureka was removed from the competition due to a knee injury she sustained in the second episode.)
Charlie Hides	52	Boston, Massachusetts (Note: Charlie Hides is listed as being from both Boston, Massachusetts and London, United Kingdom on the show.)	12th place
Kimora Blac	27	Las Vegas, Nevada	13th place
Jaymes Mansfield	26	Milwaukee, Wisconsin	14th place

== Contestant progress ==
Legend:

Sasha Velour won RuPaul's Drag Race season 9.
Peppermint was the runner-up.
Valentina was voted Miss Congeniality (Miss C) by the viewers.
WIN indicates that the contestant won the challenge.
SAFE indicates that the contestant was declared safe by the judges.
BTM (Bottom) indicates that the contestant was up for elimination.
ELIM (Eliminated) indicates that the contestant was eliminated.
WDR (Withdraw) indicates that Eureka was removed from the competition due to injury.
Guest indicates that the contestant returned as a guest.

Progress of contestants including placements in each episode
Contestant	Episode													
Contestant	1	2	3	4	5	6	7	8	9	10	11	12	13	14
Sasha Velour	SAFE	SAFE	SAFE	WIN	SAFE	SAFE	SAFE	SAFE	WIN	SAFE	SAFE	SAFE	Guest	Winner
Peppermint	SAFE	SAFE	SAFE	SAFE	SAFE	BTM	SAFE	WIN	SAFE	SAFE	BTM	SAFE	Guest	Runner-up
Shea Couleé	SAFE	SAFE	SAFE	WIN	WIN	SAFE	SAFE	SAFE	WIN	BTM	WIN	SAFE	Guest	Eliminated
Trinity Taylor	SAFE	SAFE	WIN	BTM	SAFE	SAFE	WIN	SAFE	SAFE	WIN	SAFE	SAFE	Guest	Eliminated
Alexis Michelle	SAFE	SAFE	SAFE	SAFE	SAFE	WIN	SAFE	BTM	SAFE	SAFE	ELIM		Guest	Guest
Nina Bo'nina Brown	WIN	SAFE	SAFE	SAFE	SAFE	SAFE	BTM	SAFE	BTM	ELIM			Guest	Guest
Valentina	SAFE	WIN	SAFE	SAFE	SAFE	SAFE	SAFE	SAFE	ELIM				Miss C	Guest
Farrah Moan	SAFE	SAFE	SAFE	SAFE	BTM	SAFE	SAFE	ELIM					Guest	Guest
Aja	SAFE	SAFE	BTM	SAFE	SAFE	SAFE	ELIM						Guest	Guest
Cynthia Lee Fontaine		SAFE	SAFE	SAFE	BTM	ELIM							Guest	Guest
Eureka	SAFE	SAFE	SAFE	SAFE	WDR								Guest	Guest
Charlie Hides	SAFE	SAFE	SAFE	ELIM									Guest	Guest
Kimora Blac	SAFE	BTM	ELIM										Guest	Guest
Jaymes Mansfield	SAFE	ELIM											Guest	Guest

== Lip syncs ==
Legend:

The contestant was eliminated after their first time in the bottom.
The contestant was eliminated after their second time in the bottom.
The contestant was eliminated after their third time in the bottom.
The contestant won the first round of the Lip Sync Smackdown for the Crown.
The contestant won the second round of the Lip Sync Smackdown for the Crown and was declared the winner of the season.

Episode	Contestants			Song	Eliminated
2	Jaymes Mansfield	vs.	Kimora Blac	"Love Shack" (The B-52's)	Jaymes Mansfield
3	Aja	vs.	Kimora Blac	"Holding Out for a Hero" (Bonnie Tyler)	Kimora Blac
4	Charlie Hides	vs.	Trinity Taylor	"I Wanna Go" (Britney Spears)	Charlie Hides
5	Cynthia Lee Fontaine	vs.	Farrah Moan	"Woman Up" (Meghan Trainor)	None (Note: Due to Eureka O’Hara’s medical removal, both contestants were saved from elimination.)
6	Cynthia Lee Fontaine	vs.	Peppermint	"Music" (Madonna)	Cynthia Lee Fontaine
7	Aja	vs.	Nina Bo'nina Brown	"Finally" (CeCe Peniston)	Aja
8	Alexis Michelle	vs.	Farrah Moan	"Baby I'm Burnin'" (Dolly Parton)	Farrah Moan
9	Nina Bo'nina Brown	vs.	Valentina	"Greedy" (Ariana Grande)	Valentina
10	Nina Bo'nina Brown	vs.	Shea Couleé	"Cool for the Summer" (Demi Lovato)	Nina Bo'nina Brown
11	Alexis Michelle	vs.	Peppermint	"Macho Man" (Village People)	Alexis Michelle
12	Peppermint vs. Sasha Velour vs. Shea Couleé vs. Trinity Taylor			"U Wear It Well" (RuPaul)	None
Episode	Contestants			Song	Winner
14	Peppermint	vs.	Trinity Taylor	"Stronger" (Britney Spears)	Peppermint
14	Sasha Velour	vs.	Shea Couleé	"So Emotional" (Whitney Houston)	Sasha Velour
14	Peppermint	vs.	Sasha Velour	"It's Not Right But It's Okay (Thunderpuss Remix)" (Whitney Houston)	Sasha Velour

== Guest judges ==
Listed in chronological order:

- Lady Gaga, singer, songwriter, and actress
- The B-52's, new wave band
- Todrick Hall, actor and singer
- Cheyenne Jackson, actor and singer
- Jeffrey Bowyer-Chapman, actor and model
- Naya Rivera, actress and singer
- Meghan Trainor, singer and songwriter
- Candis Cayne, actress
- Denis O'Hare, actor
- Jennie Garth, actress
- Tori Spelling, actress and television personality
- Fortune Feimster, writer, comedian, and actress
- Tamar Braxton, singer and television personality
- Lisa Robertson, television personality and former QVC host
- Noah Galvin, actor
- Kesha, singer and songwriter
- Zaldy, Emmy-winning fashion designer
- Andie MacDowell, actress
- Joan Smalls, fashion model

=== Special guests ===
Guests who appeared in episodes, but did not judge on the main stage.

Episode 2

- Lisa Kudrow, actress and comedian

Episode 12

- Todrick Hall, actor and singer

Episode 14

- Laverne Cox, actress and activist (via video message)
- Blac Chyna, model, actress, and socialite (via video message)
- Katy Perry, singer and songwriter (via video message)
- Bobby Moynihan, actor and comedian (via video message)
- Bob the Drag Queen, winner of season 8

== Episodes ==
No. overall	No. in season	Title	Original release date
104	1	"Oh. My. Gaga!"	March 24, 2017
Thirteen new queens enter the workroom. For this week's main challenge, the queens present two looks for the Miss Charisma, Uniqueness, Nerve and Talent Pageant: A hometown outfit and a Lady Gaga inspired outfit. Eureka, Nina Bo'nina Brown and Sasha Velour receive positive critiques, with Nina Bo'nina Brown winning the challenge. At the end of the episode, RuPaul reveals that she will be introducing a fourteenth queen.: Guest Judge: Lady Gaga; Alternating Judges: Carson Kressley and Ross Mathews; Main Challenge: Present two looks for the Miss Charisma, Uniqueness, Nerve and Talent Pageant: A hometown outfit and a Lady Gaga inspired outfit; Challenge Winner: Nina Bo'nina Brown; Challenge Prize: A weeklong getaway to The Grand Resort and Spa at Fort Lauderdale Beach.; Eliminated: None
105	2	"She Done Already Done Brought It On"	March 31, 2017
At the beginning of the episode, it is revealed that the fourteenth queen is Cynthia Lee Fontaine, who previously competed on Season 8. For this week's main challenge, the queens team up and compete in a cheerleading battle.: Team B-52 Bombers: Cynthia Lee Fontaine, Eureka, Farrah Moan, Kimora Blac, Peppermint, Trinity Taylor and Valentina; Team RuPaul's Glamazons: Aja, Alexis Michelle, Charlie Hides, Jaymes Mansfield, Nina Bo'nina Brown, Sasha Velour and Shea Couleé; On the runway, category is White Party Realness. Shea Couleé, Trinity Taylor and Valentina receive positive critiques, with Valentina winning the challenge. Charlie Hides, Jaymes Mansfield and Kimora Blac receive negative critiques, with Charlie Hides being safe. Jaymes Mansfield and Kimora Blac lip-sync to "Love Shack" by The B-52's. Kimora Blac wins the lip-sync and Jaymes Mansfield is the first queen to sashay away.: Returned: Cynthia Lee Fontaine; Guest Judges: The B-52's; Alternating Judge: Ross Mathews; Main Challenge: Compete in a cheerleading battle; Runway Theme: White Party Realness; Challenge Winner: Valentina; Challenge Prize: A wig wardrobe by RockStar Wigs.; Bottom Two: Jaymes Mansfield and Kimora Blac; Lip-Sync Song: "Love Shack" by The B-52's; Eliminated: Jaymes Mansfield; Farewell message: "You live to love me more each day. P.S. JK I love you all. J.M"
106	3	"Draggily Ever After"	April 7, 2017
For this week's main challenge, the queens create an original fairytale princess with a sassy sidekick. On the runway, category is Fairytale Princess Eleganza. Peppermint, Trinity Taylor and Valentina receive positive critiques, with Trinity Taylor winning the challenge. Aja, Farrah Moan and Kimora Blac receive negative critiques, with Farrah Moan being safe. Aja and Kimora Blac lip-sync to "Holding Out for a Hero" by Bonnie Tyler. Aja wins the lip-sync and Kimora Blac sashays away.: Guest Judges: Todrick Hall and Cheyenne Jackson; Alternating Judge: Carson Kressley; Main Challenge: Create an original fairytale princess with a sassy sidekick; Runway Theme: Fairytale Princess Eleganza; Challenge Winner: Trinity Taylor; Challenge Prize: $5000 gift card for Casper Sleep.; Bottom Two: Aja and Kimora Blac; Lip-Sync Song: "Holding Out for a Hero" by Bonnie Tyler; Eliminated: Kimora Blac; Farewell message: "Hey ladies, I ❤️ you all! Sisters 4 ever ❤️ Kimmy"
107	4	"Good Morning Bitches"	April 14, 2017
For this week's main challenge, the queens team up and produce a live morning talk show.: Team Good Morning Bitches: Aja, Alexis Michelle, Farrah Moan, Sasha Velour, Shea Couleé and Valentina; Team Not on Today: Charlie Hides, Cynthia Lee Fontaine, Eureka, Farrah Moan, Nina Bo'nina Brown, Peppermint and Trinity Taylor; On the runway, category is Naughty Nighties. Team Good Morning Bitches is the winning team, with Sasha Velour and Shea Couleé both winning the challenge. Team Not on Today is the losing team. Charlie Hides, Peppermint and Trinity Taylor receive negative critiques, with Peppermint being safe. Charlie Hides and Trinity Taylor lip-sync to "I Wanna Go" by Britney Spears. Trinity Taylor wins the lip-sync and Charlie Hides sashays away.: Guest Judges: Jeffrey Bowyer-Chapman and Naya Rivera; Alternating Judge: Ross Mathews; Main Challenge: In teams, produce a live morning talk show; Runway Theme: Naughty Nighties; Challenge Winners: Sasha Velour and Shea Couleé; Challenge Prize: $1000 and a year-supply of hamburgers courtesy of Hamburger Mary's; Bottom Two: Charlie Hides and Trinity Taylor; Lip-Sync Song: "I Wanna Go" by Britney Spears; Eliminated: Charlie Hides; Farewell message: "Ladies, I've enjoyed getting to know each + every one of you! Slay it. xo Charlie"
108	5	"Reality Stars: The Musical"	April 21, 2017
For this week's mini-challenge, the queens shoot a sexy selfie with the pit crew. Alexis Michelle wins the mini-challenge. For the main challenge, the queens perform in Kardashian: The Musical.: Aja plays Kourtney Kardashian; Alexis Michelle plays Kris Jenner; Cynthia Lee Fontaine plays Kim Kardashian; Eureka plays North West; Farrah Moan plays Kylie Jenner; Nina Bo'nina Brown plays Khloé Kardashian; Peppermint plays Britney Spears; Sasha Velour plays Lindsay Lohan; Shea Couleé plays Blac Chyna; Trinity Taylor plays Paris Hilton; Valentina plays Kendall Jenner; On the runway, category is Faux Fur Fabulous. Alexis Michelle, Peppermint and Shea Couleé receive positive critiques, with Shea Couleé winning the challenge. Cynthia Lee Fontaine, Farrah Moan and Nina Bo'nina Brown receive negative critiques, with Nina Bo'nina Brown being safe. Cynthia Lee Fontaine and Farrah Moan lip-sync to "Woman Up" by Meghan Trainor. After the lip-sync, RuPaul reveals that Eureka will be leaving the competition due to her knee injury. She was given an open invitation to return next season. Because of this removal, Cynthia Lee Fontaine and Farrah Moan both win the lip-sync.: Guest Judges: Meghan Trainor and Todrick Hall; Alternating Judge: Carson Kressley; Mini-Challenge: Shoot a sexy selfie with the pit crew; Mini-Challenge Winner: Alexis Michelle; Mini-Challenge Prize: A $1000 gift card from fiercequeen.com; Main Challenge: Kardashian: The Musical; Runway Theme: Faux Fur Fabulous; Challenge Winner: Shea Couleé; Challenge Prize: A Caribbean Cruise by AllOutVacations; Bottom Two: Cynthia Lee Fontaine and Farrah Moan; Lip-Sync Song: "Woman Up" by Meghan Trainor; Removed: Eureka; Farewell message: "Well... Biggie is out but this is NOT the last of Me!! I need all of you to ALWAYS (lol) #beyourselftofreeyourself ❤️ Eureka H!! :p"
109	6	"Snatch Game"	April 28, 2017
For this week's main challenge, the queens play the Snatch Game. Candice Cayne and Denis O'Hare star as the celebrity contestants. The cast consisted of: Aja as Alyssa Edwards; Alexis Michelle as Liza Minnelli; Cynthia Lee Fontaine as Sofia Vergara; Farrah Moan as Gigi Gorgeous; Nina Bo'nina Brown as Jasmine Masters; Peppermint as NeNe Leakes; Sasha Velour as Marlene Dietrich; Shea Couleé as Naomi Campbell; Trinity Taylor as Amanda Lepore; Valentina as Ariadna Gutiérrez; On the runway, category is Night of a Thousand Madonna's. Alexis Michelle, Nina Bo'nina Brown and Sasha Velour receive positive critiques, with Alexis Michelle winning the challenge. Cynthia Lee Fontaine, Farrah Moan and Peppermint receive negative critiques, with Farrah Moan being safe. Cynthia Lee Fontaine and Peppermint lip-sync to "Music" by Madonna. Peppermint wins the lip-sync and Cynthia Lee Fontaine sashays away.: Guest Judges: Candis Cayne and Denis O'Hare; Alternating Judge: Ross Mathews; Main Challenge: Snatch Game; Runway Theme: Night of a Thousand Madonna's; Challenge Winner: Alexis Michelle; Challenge Prize: A $2000 package from Sparkles Rhinestones; Bottom Two: Cynthia Lee Fontaine and Peppermint; Lip-Sync Song: "Music" by Madonna; Eliminated: Cynthia Lee Fontaine; Farewell message: "Don't stop believe in you!!! Love you, Cucu x xo xo"
110	7	"9021-HO"	May 5, 2017
For this week's main challenge, the queens act in a 90210 parody spin-off, titled 9021-HO: Aja plays Bethani Glamber Gliessen; Alexis Michelle plays Mirror Monna Dartin; Farrah Moan plays Nelly; Nina Bo'nina Brown plays Blenda Shmaltz; Peppermint plays Brandi Shmaltz; Sasha Velour plays Lunch Lady Kat; Shea Couleé plays Grandrea Zuckerwoman; Trinity Taylor plays Nelly's Mom; Valentina plays Monna Dartin; On the runway, category is Big Hair Everywhere. Shea Couleé, Trinity Taylor and Valentina receive positive critiques, with Trinity Taylor winning the challenge. Aja, Nina Bo'nina Brown and Sasha Velour receive negative critiques, with Sasha Velour being safe. Aja and Nina Bo'nina Brown lip-sync to "Finally" by Cece Peniston. Nina Bo'nina Brown wins the lip-sync and Aja sashays away.: Guest Judges: Jennie Garth and Tori Spelling; Alternating Judge: Carson Kressley; Main Challenge: Act in a 90210 parody spin-off, titled 9021-HO; Runway Theme: Big Hair Everywhere; Challenge Winner: Trinity Taylor; Challenge Prize: $2000 gift card from Fabric Planet; Bottom Two: Aja and Nina Bo'nina Brown; Lip-Sync Song: "Finally" by Cece Peniston; Eliminated: Aja; Farewell message: "Love u guys, please dont be too messy without me! XOXO AJA ❤️ P.S. Ur all gay!"
111	8	"RuPaul Roast"	May 12, 2017
For this week's mini-challenge, the queens read each other to filth. Valentina wins the mini-challenge. For the main challenge, the queens perform a roast of Michelle Visage in front of the judges and a live audience. On the runway, Peppermint, Sasha Velour and Shea Couleé receive positive critiques, with Peppermint winning the challenge. Alexis Michelle, Farrah Moan and Trinity Taylor receive negative critiques, with Trinity Taylor being safe. Alexis Michelle and Farrah Moan lip-sync to "Baby I'm Burning" by Dolly Parton. Alexis Michelle wins the lip-sync and Farrah Moan sashays away.: Guest Judges: Fortune Feimster and Tamar Braxton; Alternating Judge: Ross Mathews; Mini-Challenge: Reading is Fundamental; Mini-Challenge Winner: Valentina; Mini-Challenge Prize: 4-night stay at Saguaro in Palm Springs; Main Challenge: Perform a roast of Michelle Visage in front of the judges and a live audience; Challenge Winner: Peppermint; Challenge Prize: 5-year membership with SquareSpace; Bottom Two: Alexis Michelle and Farrah Moan; Lip-Sync Song: "Baby I'm Burning" by Dolly Parton; Eliminated: Farrah Moan; Farewell message: "Hey ladies! I love you all sooo much. You are all superstars and it's so special to finally have a real family. Good luck & DON'T F**K IT UP! ❤️ Farrah Moan"
112	9	"Your Pilot's on Fire"	May 19, 2017
For this week's main challenge, the queens pair up to create, write, and star in their own TV pilots.: Teets & Asky - Sasha Velour and Shea Couleé; Nina & Tina - Nina Bo'nina Brown and Valentina; Mary, Mother of Gay - Alexis Michelle, Peppermint and Trinity Taylor; On the runway, category is Club Kid Couture. Peppermint, Sasha Velour, Shea Couleé and Trinity Taylor receive positive critiques, with Sasha Velour and Shea Couleé both winning the challenge. Alexis Michelle, Nina Bo'nina Brown and Valentina receive negative critiques, with Alexis Michelle being safe. Nina Bo'nina Brown and Valentina lip-sync to "Greedy" by Ariana Grande. Nina Bo'nina Brown wins the lip-sync and Valentina sashays away.: Guest Judges: Lisa Robertson and Noah Galvin; Alternating Judge: Carson Kressley; Main Challenge: In pairs, create, write, and star in their own TV pilots; Runway Theme: Club Kid Couture; Challenge Winners: Sasha Velour and Shea Couleé; Challenge Prize: A $1000 gift certificate from The Spa On Rodeo and a supply of Aquage Professional Haircare products; Bottom Two: Nina Bo'nina Brown and Valentina; Lip-Sync Song: "Greedy" by Ariana Grande; Eliminated: Valentina; Farewell message: "Ladies, I love you with all my heart. If ever you need me, I'm yours. Con Amor. Valentina"
113	10	"Makeovers: Crew Better Work"	May 26, 2017
For this week's main challenge, the queens makeover members of the RuPaul's Drag Race crew. On the runway, Sasha Velour and Trinity Taylor receive positive critiques, with Trinity Taylor winning the challenge. Alexis Michelle, Nina Bo'nina Brown and Shea Couleé receive negative critiques, with Alexis Michelle being safe. Nina Bo'nina Brown and Shea Couleé lip-sync to "Cool for the Summer" by Demi Lovato. Shea Couleé wins the lip-sync and Nina Bo'nina Brown sashays away.: Guest Judges: Kesha and Zaldy; Alternating Judge: Ross Mathews; Main Challenge: Makeover members of the RuPaul's Drag Race crew; Challenge Winner: Trinity Taylor; Challenge Prize: Two custom gowns made by David Meister, and a $2,000 gift certificate to Klein Epstein Parker for her drag sister; Bottom Two: Nina Bo'nina Brown and Shea Couleé; Lip-Sync Song: "Cool for the Summer" by Demi Lovato; Eliminated: Nina Bo'nina Brown; Farewell message: "Debbie Downer is gone. SUE ME! Shae Coulee hope you struggle cleaning this LOL. Love you all ❤️"
114	11	"Gayest Ball Ever"	June 2, 2017
For this week's mini-challenge, the queens have a bitchfest with puppets. Sasha Velour wins the mini-challenge. For the main challenge, the queens create three looks for The Gayest Ball Ever: Rainbow-She-Better-Do, Sexy Unicorn and Village People Eleganza Extravaganza. On the runway, Sasha Velour and Shea Couleé receive positive critiques, with Shea Couleé winning the challenge. Alexis Michelle, Peppermint and Trinity Taylor receive negative critiques, with Trinity Taylor being safe. Alexis Michelle and Peppermint lip-sync to "Macho Man" by Village People. Peppermint wins the lip-sync and Alexis Michelle sashays away.: Guest Judges: Andie MacDowell and Joan Smalls; Alternating Judge: Carson Kressley; Mini-Challenge: Everybody Loves Puppets; Mini-Challenge Winner: Sasha Velour; Mini-Challenge Prize: A $500 gift card for Today Tix; Main Challenge: The Gayest Ball Ever; Runway Themes: Rainbow-She-Better-Do, Sexy Unicorn and Village People Eleganza Extravaganza; Challenge Winner: Shea Couleé; Challenge Prize: 2 VIP tickets to Cirque du Soleil Zumanity in Las Vegas, including flights and accommodation; Bottom Two: Alexis Michelle and Peppermint; Lip-Sync Song: "Macho Man" by Village People; Eliminated: Alexis Michelle; Farewell message: "Wishes come true, not free. you're my sisters... always."
115	12	"Category Is"	June 9, 2017
For the final challenge of the season, the queens write, record and perform their own verses to RuPaul's song "Category Is". On the runway, category is Best Drag. The remaining queens then lip-sync to "U Wear It Well" by RuPaul. After the lip-sync, RuPaul does not eliminate anyone, and Peppermint, Sasha Velour, Shea Couleé and Trinity Taylor are the finalists.: Alternating Judge(s): Carson Kressley and Ross Mathews; Main Challenge: Write, record and perform their own verses to RuPaul's song "Category Is"; Runway Theme: Best Drag; Lip Sync Song: "U Wear It Well" by RuPaul; Eliminated: None
116	13	"Reunited"	June 16, 2017
The queens all return for the reunion. Discussions include, Charlie Hides' lip-sync, Valentina's elimination and Aja and Valentina's Untucked fight. It is then announced that Valentina is this season's Miss Congeniality.: Miss Congeniality: Valentina
117	14	"Grand Finale"	June 23, 2017
The queens all return for the live grand finale. RuPaul then tells the final four queens that they will be performing in a lip-sync smackdown for the crown. The first lip-sync is between Peppermint and Trinity Taylor. They lip-sync to "Stronger" by Britney Spears. Peppermint wins the lip-sync and Trinity Taylor is eliminated. The second lip-sync is between Sasha Velour and Shea Couleé. They lip-sync to "So Emotional" by Whitney Houston. Sasha Velour wins the lip-sync and Shea Couleé is eliminated. The final lip-sync is between Peppermint and Sasha Velour. They lip-sync to "It's Not Right But It's Okay" (Thunderpuss Remix) by Whitney Houston. It is announced that Sasha Velour is the winner, leaving Peppermint as the runner-up.: Finals venue: Alex Theatre, Glendale, California; Final Four: Peppermint, Sasha Velour, Shea Couleé and Trinity Taylor; Lip-Sync Smackdown #1: Peppermint vs. Trinity Taylor; Lip-Sync Song: "Stronger" by Britney Spears; Eliminated: Trinity Taylor; Lip-Sync Smackdown #2: Sasha Velour vs. Shea Couleé; Lip-Sync Song: "So Emotional" by Whitney Houston; Eliminated: Shea Couleé; Lip-Sync Smackdown #3: Peppermint vs. Sasha Velour; Lip-Sync Song: "It's Not Right But It's Okay" (Thunderpuss Remix) by Whitney Houston; Runner-up: Peppermint; Winner of RuPaul's Drag Race Season Nine: Sasha Velour

== Ratings ==
Viewership and ratings per episode of RuPaul's Drag Race season 9
No.	Title	Air date	Rating (18–49)	Viewers (millions)
1	"Oh. My. Gaga!"	March 24, 2017	0.5	0.987
2	"She Done Already Done Brought It On"	March 31, 2017	0.4	0.754
3	"Draggily Ever After"	April 7, 2017	0.3	0.673
4	"Good Morning Bitches"	April 14, 2017	0.3	0.588
5	"Reality Stars: The Musical"	April 21, 2017	0.3	0.693
6	"Snatch Game"	April 28, 2017	0.4	0.702
7	"9021-HO"	May 5, 2017	0.3	0.694
8	"RuPaul Roast"	May 12, 2017	0.4	0.738
9	"Your Pilot's On Fire"	May 19, 2017	0.3	0.636
10	"Makeovers: Crew Better Work"	May 26, 2017	0.4	0.720
11	"Gayest Ball Ever"	June 2, 2017	0.3	0.619
12	"Category Is"	June 9, 2017	0.3	0.637
13	"Reunited"	June 16, 2017	0.3	0.685
14	"Grand Finale"	June 23, 2017	0.4	0.859
