= Charlie Hides =

British-American drag queen, impersonator, actor, and comedian

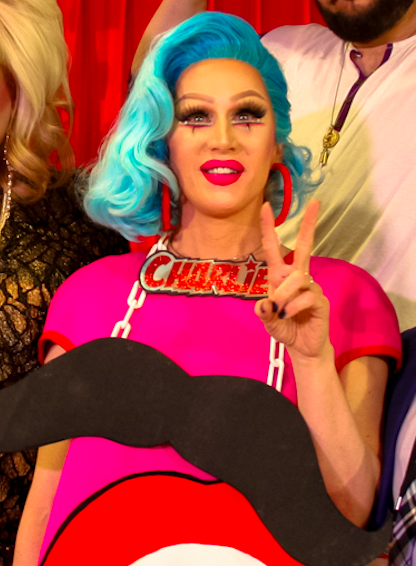
- Hides, circa 2017
- Born: 12 July 1964 (age 62); Boston, Massachusetts, U.S.
- Citizenship: United Kingdom, United States, Ireland
- Education: Massachusetts College of Art and Design
- Occupations: Drag queen; actor; comedian; impersonator
- Known for: YouTube; RuPaul's Drag Race
- Spouse: James Hides (m. 2004)

YouTube information
- Channel: Charlie Hides TV
- Years active: 2011–present
- Genre: Comedy
- Subscribers: 100 thousand
- Views: 23.8 million
- Last updated: 12 July 2020
- Website: charliehidestv.com

Charlie Hides (born 12 July 1964) is a British-American drag queen, impersonator, actor, and comedian. Hides is known for his YouTube channel, and his participation in the ninth season of RuPaul's Drag Race. Following live performances in London clubs, Hides started a YouTube channel in March 2011. He has produced hundreds of videos satirizing popular culture, and impersonating celebrities such as Cher, Madonna, Lady Gaga, and Lana Del Rey.

== Personal life ==
Hides was born in Boston, Massachusetts on 12 July 1964. He attended the Massachusetts College of Art and Design. He currently lives in London and has multiple citizenship, being a citizen of the United States, United Kingdom, and Ireland.

== Career ==
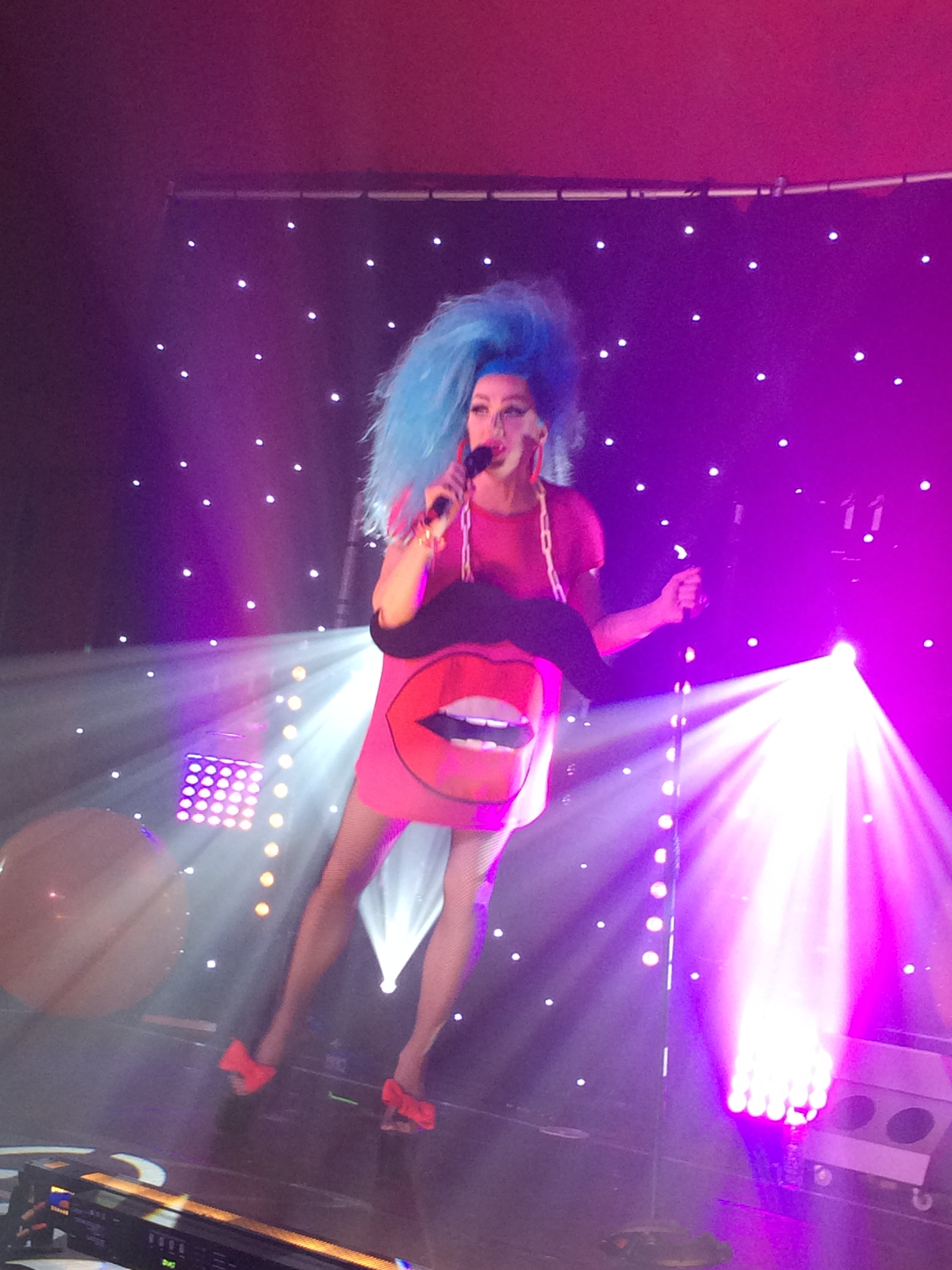
Charlie Hides in 2017

Hides started a YouTube channel after high-definition video uploading became available on the website. Following the creation of his channel, he uploaded some of the videos that he used in live performances and comedy routines. Since Hides created the Charlie Hides TV YouTube channel in March 2011, he has uploaded over 200 videos. These include series such as Madonna/Lady Gaga Nightmares and Shit ____ Says.

In 2013, Hides uploaded a sketch that starred Australian singer and actress Kylie Minogue. He impersonated Cher during a telephone call with Minogue. In 2015, Hides starred on the TV show Big Brother's Bit on the Side, where he impersonated celebrities whilst commenting on Celebrity Big Brother contestants. Hides also had a cameo role in the film Absolutely Fabulous: The Movie, as a drag performer. In 2014, The Charlie Hides Show aired on London Live as a pilot show, incorporating elements from his live performances and YouTube channel.

Hides has occasionally drawn the attention of some of the acts that he impersonates. In a 2013 interview with the Herald Sun, Cher said that Hides was her "favourite Cher impersonator". When Lady Gaga was in London, she sent flowers to Hides, alongside a note. Hides has also stated that Liza Minnelli, Elton John and Kris Jenner have been "very kind".

In December 2015, Hides was accused of using blackface and ethnic stereotypes to represent one of his characters, Laquisha Jonz. An activist, Chardine Taylor-Stone, launched a petition on the website Change.org, calling for the Royal Vauxhall Tavern, and other venues, to cancel Hides' performances. Taylor-Stone claimed that the character was "a racist act based on misogynist stereotypes of black working-class women, it is outdated, offensive, shameful and has no place in the LGBT Community". As a result, Hides stated that he will no longer use the character in his performances.

== RuPaul's Drag Race ==
On 2 February 2017, Logo TV announced that Hides would participate as a contestant in the ninth season of American reality competition RuPaul's Drag Race. Aged 52 at the time of competing, Hides was the oldest contestant to participate in any Drag Race franchise. This record would be broken in late 2023, when it was announced that 57-year-old Kitten Kaboodle would compete on the fourth season of Canada's Drag Race. The season premiered on 24 March 2017, on VH1. In an interview with BBC News Newsbeat, Hides said:

The label drag queen is not just a cookie cutter, one-size fits all type of label. There's pageant girls, there's comics, there's celebrity impersonators. There's every different type of queen under the sun. That's one of the things that Drag Race has definitely shown over the course of nine seasons. That there's so many different ways to express yourself using this art form. You'd think it's just gay men, but it's got a huge following of women who are watching for the fashion. They're watching for the colourful sense of humour and then they're identifying with us. The contestants are human beings and not just seen as some dancing clowns or as freaks. We are definitely in need of laughter, sunshine, brightness and colour. Drag queens are defiant. We are the counter culture, the opposition party. We are everything that the moral majority and small-minded bigots fear.

On the fourth episode of the show, entitled "Good Morning Bitches", Hides was eliminated from the competition. He was placed in the bottom two by the judges, and therefore had to participate in a "Lip-Sync for Your Life" to Britney Spears' "I Wanna Go" against fellow contestant Trinity Taylor. Hides commented on the lip-sync, saying that the self-described "disaster" was a result of having a fractured rib, due to a cheerleading challenge several episodes prior. In the episode's challenge, Hides was critiqued for his performance in the talk show segment of the episode. The morning after his elimination, Hides uploaded a music video for his new single, "The Dame".

== Filmography ==
=== Television ===
Year	Title	Role	Notes	Ref.
2014	The Charlie Hides Show	Self	Pilot show on London Live	
2015	Big Brother's Bit on the Side	Various	Multiple impersonation sketches	
2017	RuPaul's Drag Race	Self (contestant)	Season nine Contestant- 12th Place	
2017	RuPaul's Drag Race: Untucked	Self (contestant)	Spin-off series on WOWPresents	

=== Film ===
Year	Title	Role	Notes	Ref.
2016	Absolutely Fabulous: The Movie	Drag queen	Cameo role	

== Discography and parodies ==
Title	Year
"The Edge of Glory"	2011
"MILF Gone Wild"	2012
"Boyfriend"	2012
"Turn Up the Radio"	2012
"Woman's World"	2013
"Roar"/"Wrecking Ball"	2013
"Applause"	2013
"Judas"	2013
"Venus"	2013
"Adore You"	2014
"Booty"	2014
"All About That Bass"	2014
"Welcome to New York"	2014
"Living for Love"	2015
"You Fucked a Bad Gay"	2015
"Don't Call Us"	2017
"The Dame"	2017

== Awards and nominations ==
Year	Award	Category	Result	Ref.
2014	Royal Television Society Awards	Best Low Budget Programme	Won	
2016	Boyz Awards	Best Cabaret Act	Won	
