= Nina Bo'nina Brown =

American drag performer

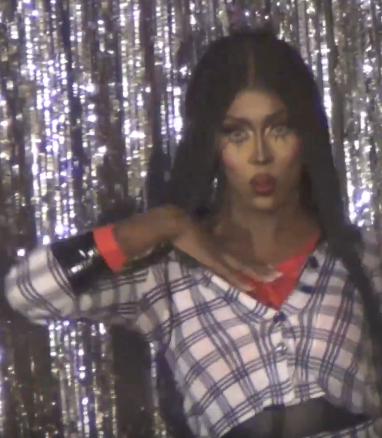
- Brown in 2018
- Born: Pierre Leverne Dease; July 12, 1982 (age 44); Columbia, South Carolina, U.S.
- Occupations: Drag queen; YouTuber
- Known for: RuPaul's Drag Race

YouTube information
- Channel: Nina Bo'nina Brown
- Years active: 2006–present
- Genres: Comedy; make-up artist; drag
- Subscribers: 146 thousand
- Views: 30.21 million
- Last updated: April 9, 2026

Pierre Leverne Dease (born July 12, 1982), better known by the stage name Nina Bo'nina Brown, is an American drag queen and television personality best known for starring on the ninth season of RuPaul's Drag Race, where she placed sixth.

== Early life ==
She was born on July 12, 1982, and raised in Columbia, South Carolina before moving to Riverdale, Georgia, where she currently resides.

== Career ==
=== Early drag career ===
Nina Bo’nina Brown made her drag performance debut under the stage name 'Shameekah' in 2009. Before adopting her current name, she also performed under the stage names 'Beatta Bitchass' and 'Lady Guinavere'.

In 2013, Brown began uploading makeup tutorials to her YouTube channel. These videos, along with uploads of her casting auditions for seasons five through eight, gained Brown prominence in the drag community. She was the makeup artist for some of Phi Phi O'Hara's looks for her "365 Days of Drag" project.

=== RuPaul's Drag Race ===
Brown auditioned for RuPaul's Drag Race seasons five through eight. She was announced as one of fourteen contestants competing on the ninth season of RuPaul's Drag Race on February 2, 2017.

The premier of season 9, Drag Race's first episode on VH1, aired on March 24, 2017. Brown entered the Werkroom in a mouse look made of paper with the entrance line, "I'm Nina, Bo'nina, Banana, Fofana, Osama Bin Laden Brown! Boom! Boom! Boom! Boom!" She was the winner of the premiere episode's challenge (Miss Charisma, Uniqueness, Nerve and Talent), guest judged by Lady Gaga.

In episode five, Brown voiced her frustrations on not being cast as model Blac Chyna for the Rusical challenge. She named her 2018 tour "I Shoulda Been Blac Chyna" after this moment. Drag Race alumni Alaska also referenced this moment in a line of her song "Valentina".

Brown placed in the bottom two three times, eliminating Aja and Valentina. She was eliminated on the makeover challenge episode after losing a lip sync of "Cool for the Summer" by Demi Lovato against Shea Couleé.

==== Fashion Photo RuView ====
Brown and Vanessa Vanjie Mateo guest hosted four episodes of the WOWPresents internet series Fashion Photo RuView between November 2018 and January 2019.

=== Rawview YouTube series ===
Since the premier of All Stars 4 in 2018, Brown has self-published reviews of Rupaul's Drag Race and its international spin-off series on her YouTube channel. Rawviews are generally segmented into general discussion, reading tips and comments, 'Beauty and Looks', and a live reaction to the respective episode.

In addition to reviewing Drag Race, Brown has created Rawviews for other shows including The Boulet Brothers' Dragula and WOW Presents Plus series Painted with Raven.

=== MAC Cosmetics Campaign ===
In June 2018, she was sponsored by MAC Cosmetics to review and promote the 2018 Aaliyah collection. She dressed as a humanoid zebra in the July 2018 issue of Paper, modeling for Gypsy Sport's Fall 2018 campaign. She modeled again for Gypsy Sport's Spring 2019 campaign.

== Personal life ==
Dease is openly gay. Prior to filming season nine of Drag Race, he relocated to Atlanta, Georgia.

In RuPaul's Drag Race: Untucked, Dease stated that his audition for season nine was going to be his final attempt. According to Dease, being rejected from seasons five through eight played a role in his depression and anxiety.

== Controversies ==
In 2017, Nina Bo’nina Brown received backlash for sending fan favorite Valentina home in a lipsync for your life on the 9th episode of the ninth season of RuPaul's Drag Race. The elimination went down as one of the shows most controversial lipsyncs and placed in Gay Times Top 10 Most Controversial RuPaul's Drag Race Eliminations.

== Filmography ==
=== Television ===
Year	Title	Role	Notes
2017	RuPaul's Drag Race	Herself	Season 9, 6th place
2017	RuPaul's Drag Race: Untucked	Herself	Season 9
2017	The Real Housewives of Atlanta	Herself	Episode: Season 10, Episode 1

=== Web series ===
Year	Title	Role	Notes	Ref.
2016	Transformations	Herself	Episode: "Nina Bonina Brown"	
2017	Drag Queen Carpool	Herself	Hosted by RuPaul	
2017	Drag Makeup Tutorial	Herself		
2017	Hey Qween!	Herself	Hosted by Jonny McGovern	
2017	Whatcha Packin'	Herself	Hosted by Michelle Visage	
2017	Queen To Queen	Herself	With Aja	
2018	Fashion Photo RuView	Herself (guest co-host)	4 episodes	
2019	Reading Queens	Herself		
2019	How To Makeup	Herself		
2019–present	Rawview series	Herself (host)	Nina Bo'nina Brown's YouTube channel	
2020	Brunch With Tiffany	Herself	Episode: Season 3, Episode 6 (Finale)	
