= Valentina (drag queen) =

American drag performer

- Valentina in 2026
- Born: May 14, 1991 (age 35); Bell, California, U.S.
- Other name: Xunaxi
- Occupations: Drag queen, Actress
- Years active: 2015–present
- Known for: RuPaul's Drag Race (season 9); RuPaul's Drag Race All Stars (season 4); Drag Race México
- Title: Miss Congeniality
- Predecessor: Cynthia Lee Fontaine
- Successor: Monét X Change
- Website: Official Instagram

Valentina Xunaxi Leyva (born May 14, 1991), better known mononymously as Valentina, is an American drag performer, actress, television personality and singer who came to international fame as a contestant on the ninth season of RuPaul's Drag Race and the fourth season of RuPaul's Drag Race All Stars. In 2023, she co-hosted season one of Drag Race México alongside Lolita Banana.

== Early life ==
Valentina was born in Bell, California, to Mexican parents and grew up Catholic. She began working as a drag queen around ten months before filming RuPaul's Drag Race, although she already had a background in fashion and the performing arts. Leyva chose to go by "Valentina" in drag after the hot sauce of the same name. Valentina is known for using her drag as a way to represent Latin American culture on stage and make drag more accepted in Latin American culture.

== Career ==
=== Dragula ===
In 2015, Valentina won an early club version of the Boulet Brothers's Dragula contest, a precursor of the television show.

=== Rupaul's Drag Race (Season 9) ===
==== Announcement ====
On February 2, 2017, Valentina was announced as one of fourteen contestants competing for the ninth season of RuPaul's Drag Race.

==== "Oh. My. Gaga." Season 9 Episode 1 ====
In the First Episode of the season, "Oh. My. Gaga.", Valentina introduced herself to the RuPaul's Drag Race fandom wearing a red dress, red and gold jewelry and a wig with two large red roses in it. During the "Miss Charisma, Uniqueness, Nerve, and Talent Pageant" in the Hometown runway portion in the first episode of the season, Valentina paid tribute to her Mexican heritage by wearing a Mariachi inspired leotard with chaps and a sombrero with gold embellishments on the entire outfit. The Mariachi is significant in Mexican culture as a symbol of Mexican Nationalism and tradition. Mariachi is composed of a 12-person band that plays a variety of string and some brass music and an accordion. A Mariachi band is usually composed of men, so Valentina's choice to portray herself as a female Mariachi is not as widely portrayed in Mexican Nationalist Culture. As well as being a band, Mariachi is a mythic symbol of culture in Mexico and the Southwest United States.

==== "She Done Already Done Brought It On" Season 9 Episode 2 ====
During the second episode of the Ninth season, "She Done Already Done Brought It On", Valentina was seen praying to a Virgin of Guadalupe candle before the Cheerleading Maxi-challenge that episode. The Virgin of Guadalupe is a symbol of the merging of Mexican and Native American cultures. She is an important symbol of the culture in Mexican and Mexican-American communities and within the Catholic church. For the "White Party Realness" runway that episode, Valentina wore a white floral wedding gown inspired by her mother, stating she was the most beautiful bride in her village in Mexico. She won that episode's Maxi-Challenge wearing her hair in a bun, topped with flowers, and bouquet in her hands, embodying classic Mexican cultural fashion.

==== "Reality Stars: The Musical" Season 9 Episode 5 ====
During the "Faux Fur Realness" runway from the 5th episode of season 9, "Reality Stars: The Musical", Valentina channeled Mexican actress María Félix, wearing a snakeskin dress and a gold serpent necklace. Maria Felix was an actress in the 1940s who started her career on film in Mexico before continuing her career in Europe. Maria embodied the femininity and sexual desire that was prioritized in Mexican film in the period of World War II. She is also a symbol of Mexican culture worldwide. The luxury jewelry brand Cartier created a serpent necklace in 1968 with about 2,500 diamonds for Felix. Valentina wore a replica of this necklace on the runway in honor of the actress.

==== "Snatch Game" Season 9 Episode 6 ====
During Season 9 Episode 6, "Snatch Game", Valentina impersonated Ariadna Gutiérrez, Miss Colombia of 2015. Ariadna was mistakenly crowned Miss Universe that year by Steve Harvey, who later crowned Pia Wurtzbach, who represented the Philippines. She portrayed Gutierrez as traumatized by the Miss Universe Scandal, poking fun at her being a runner-up.

==== "Your Pilot's on Fire" Season 9 Episode 9 ====
During Season 9 Episode 9, "Your Pilot's on Fire", Valentina wore a red matador costume, channeling her Hispanic heritage during the "Club Kid Couture" runway. A matador is a bullfighter who uses art, dance, and movement to entrance the bull and gain the upper hand against it in the ring. Matador costumes offer no protection from the bulls and are known as a "Suit of Lights" in Hispanic culture. The redness of the cape and movement are meant to distract the bull long enough for the Matador to take a sword and attack the bull with it. Valentina's outfit had many Hispanic elements to it, such as the red roses all over her costume and headpiece, a montera hat, and a cape with embroidered multicolored flowers to imitate the matador.

==== Elimination ====
Valentina was eliminated in episode nine to Nina Bo'nina Brown after infamously losing a lip-sync battle to "Greedy" by Ariana Grande. She was reluctant to take off a mask covering her mouth as she did not know the lyrics to the song in a moment that went viral across social media while wearing a red costume symbolizing a matador who had been defeated by a bull. She placed seventh overall, and her elimination sparked some controversy online as she was popular with fans. She was later voted "Miss Congeniality" by the viewers of the show, but was mockingly dubbed "Fan Favorite" by her castmates, who believed she was unsuitable for the title.

==== Valentina Post-Season 9 ====
During the Season 9 "Whatcha Packin'?", Hosted by Michelle Visage, Valentina explains that she references old Mexican cinema and telenovelas. She attributes this to being very in touch with her Hispanic roots and heritage. She shows this love of Hispanic culture through florals, color choices, and fabrics with ties to Latin culture. During the season 10 finale, Valentina appeared via a pre-recorded video message to crown her successor for the Miss Congeniality title, Monét X Change.

Outside of Drag Race, Valentina appeared in the sixth episode of the twenty-fourth season of America's Next Top Model, in a photo shoot challenge with fellow Drag Race alumni Manila Luzon and Katya. She played Judy Reyes's character Quiet Ann in a season-one recap of Claws. In 2017, she was the host of her own WOWPresents internet show, La Vida De Valentina, which ran for seven episodes.

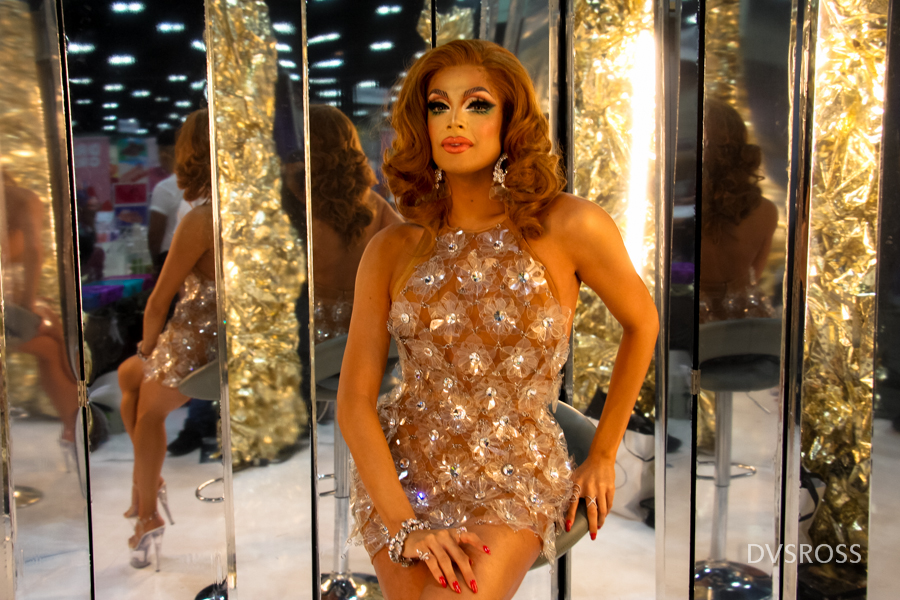
Valentina in 2018

=== RuPaul's Drag Race: All Stars (Season 4) ===
==== Announcement ====
On November 9, 2018, Valentina was announced as a contestant on the upcoming fourth season of RuPaul's Drag Race: All Stars, a spin-off of the regular Drag Race series which features returning contestants from past seasons competing for $100,000 to $250,000, a crown and scepter, and a place in the Drag Race: Hall of Fame.

==== "Super Girl Groups, Henny" Season 4 Episode 2 ====
Valentina performed a verse to the song "Don't Funk It Up" dressed as Selena Quintanilla-Perez. Selena was a Mexican-American pop star who rose to fame in the 1980s and 1990s, singing in both English and Spanish, gaining recognition in both Mexico and the US. Valentina's look was inspired by Selena's performance at the Houston Astrodome Livestock Show & Rodeo in 1995, her last televised performance of Tejano music before being fatally shot. Valentina won the Maxi-Challenge that episode along with Monét X Change, and the pair lip-synced to the song "Into You" by Ariana Grande, in which Valentina won the lip-sync and episode, redeeming herself from her "Greedy" lip-sync in season 9 of Drag Race.

==== "LalaPaRUza" Season 4 Episode 6 ====
Valentina wore another Selena-inspired outfit on All Stars Season 4 Episode 6, "LalaPaRUza", in which she wore a sparkly maroon bodysuit with matching boots, where she lip-synced to the RuPaul song "Kitty Girl" winning against Farrah Moan.

==== "Queen of Clubs" Season 4 Episode 7 and Elimination ====
After being in the bottom three times and only scoring one win, Valentina was eliminated in the seventh episode of All Stars 4, "Queens of Clubs", by Latrice Royale when she failed to impress the judges in a design challenge, causing her and Naomi Smalls to be up for elimination. Valentina wore an outfit for that episode's "Plastique Fantastique" runway inspired by a Miss Venezuela and a plastic Barbie doll.

=== Other appearances ===
Valentina was in the October 2017 issue of Vogue Mexico, and filmed a makeup tutorial for Vogue's YouTube channel. She was in the July 2017 issue of Elle Mexico modeling designs by Benito Santos for his Red Carpet 2018 campaign. She appeared in the January 2018 issue of Filipino magazine Preview. In April 2019, Valentina appeared in Vogue Mexico for a second time.

In January 2019, Valentina portrayed Angel in Rent: Live, Fox's televised production of the musical Rent. In June 2019, a panel of judges from New York magazine placed Valentina 20th on their list of "the most powerful drag queens in America", a ranking of 100 former Drag Race contestants. In 2021, she made a cameo appearance in In the Heights, during "No Me Diga".

In 2023, Valentina appeared on an episode of the Drag Race Recap YouTube series, "The Pit Stop", in which she wore a floral dress, a Frida Kahlo-inspired headpiece in her hair, with flowers styled into the buns on her head. Frida Kahlo was a Mexican artist born in 1907, and she was one of the most influential artists of her time. She often painted florals in vibrant colors, as well as self-portraits alongside exotic animals.

=== Drag Race México ===
After long periods of fan speculation in 2023, Valentina was announced as the co-host of Drag Race México alongside Lolita Banana, who competed on the premiere season of Drag Race France.

In 2024, Valentina was subsequently replaced by Taiga Brava, winner of Queen of the Universe season two, as the co-host for the series.

=== Music ===
Valentina released her debut single, "A Prueba de Todo", in December 2018.

=== Broadway debut ===
On July 21st, 2026 Valentina made her Broadway debut as Columbia in the 2026 revival of The Rocky Horror Show. She became the first trans Mexican American actress to be featured as a main cast member in a Broadway musical.

== Legacy ==
Drag Race: All Stars winner Alaska Thunderfuck did a parody song of "Despacito" called "Valentina" in October 2017, with lyrics about Valentina and her infamous elimination from the show. The cosmetics company Lush also referenced Valentina's elimination for advertising on one of their face masks.

== Personal life ==
In 2019, Valentina came out as non-binary, stating that she will continue to use she/her pronouns. Valentina is now one of several Drag Race alumni who identify as either nonbinary or gender-nonconforming.

On May 14, 2025, on her 34th birthday, Valentina publicly came out as a transgender woman and announced that she had already begun transitioning.

== Filmography ==
=== Television ===
Year	Title	Role	Notes
2017, 2018, 2021	RuPaul's Drag Race	Herself	Season 9 – Contestant, 7th Place (Miss Congeniality), Season 10 & Season 13 – Guest
2017	La Vida de Valentina	Herself	Web series
2018	America's Next Top Model	Herself	Cameo
2018	RuPaul's Drag Race All Stars	Herself	Season 4 – Contestant, 7th Place
2018	Drag Tots	Arugula	Voice only
2019	Rent: Live	Angel Dumott Schunard	Special
2019	Werq the World	Herself	Documentary series
2020	AJ and the Queen	Cameo	Episode: "New York City"
2020	Hey Qween!	Herself	Guest
2020	La Casa de las Flores	Herself	Recurring role
2021, 2023	Drag Race España	Herself	Season 1, Episode 9 — Cameo, Season 3, Episode 9 — Guest Judge
2023	Premio Lo Nuestro 2023	Herself	Performer (songs from La Usurpadora: The Musical)
2023	Drag Race México	Herself	Host

=== Films ===
Year	Title	Role	Notes
2020	Invasión Drag	Herself	Documentary about drag and gay culture in Peru
2021	In the Heights	Valentina	Cameo
2023	La Usurpadora: The Musical	Lydia	Remake of the 1998 telenovela La Usurpadora

=== Music videos ===
Year	Title	Artist(s)	Role
2019	"Yo Soy Su Vida"	Gloria Trevi	The Lover
2019	"Ábranse Perras"	Gloria Trevi	Cameo
2020	"I'm Ready"	Demi Lovato & Sam Smith	Cameo
2020	"Always"	Waze & Odyssey	Herself
2020	"La Mexicana"	Paty Cantú	Cameo
2021	"Don't Go Yet"	Camila Cabello	Herself
2021	"Como la Primera Vez"	Zemmoa feat. Valentina & America Fendi	Herself
2022	"Kung Kita'y Kapiling"	Troy Laurenta feat. Jake Zyrus	Herself
2026	"Epa"	Becky G	Queen

== Discography ==
=== Singles ===
Year	Song	Album
2018	"A Prueba De Todo"	Non-album single
2020	"All Eyes on Me"	Non-album single

==== As featured artist ====
Year	Title	Album
2018	"Don't Funk It Up" (Lizzo featuring Trinity the Tuck, Valentina, Manila Luzon, Latrice Royale & Gia Gunn)	non-album single
2021	"Como La Primera Vez" (Zemmoa featuring Valentina & America Fendi)	Lo Que Me Haces Sentir
2022	"Te Estoy Amando Locamente" (Roi Porto & Valentina)	non-album single
