= Farrah Moan =

American drag queen and entertainer (born 1993)

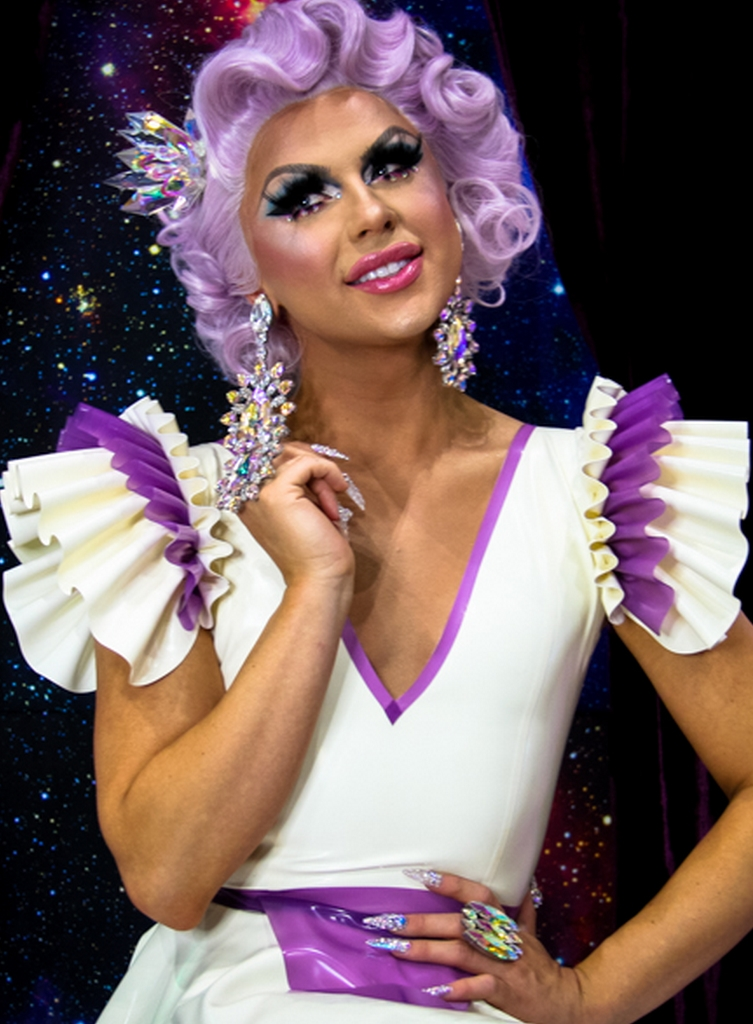
- Farrah Moan at RuPaul's DragCon LA 2018
- Born: Cameron Clayton; September 11, 1993 (age 33); Houston, Texas, U.S.
- Other name: Cameron Ugh
- Occupations: Drag queen; model
- Years active: 2012–present
- Known for: RuPaul's Drag Race

Cameron Clayton, better known by the stage name Farrah Moan (born September 11, 1993), is an American drag queen, model, actress, make-up artist and internet personality best known for participating in the 9th season of the reality TV show RuPaul's Drag Race, placing eighth, as well as participating in the 4th season of All Stars, where she placed ninth. Her stage name is a pun on the term "pheromone", whilst also being a reference to American actress Farrah Fawcett. In some interviews, she jokingly states that her drag surname is a reference to "being a whore".

== Early life ==
Clayton attended Klein High School in Houston, Texas, and was bullied during childhood. Her single-mother household was poor, and she ran away as a teenager, to Austin. Clayton left with a stripper friend, who helped start her career as a drag queen. Prior to starting drag, she was an internet personality on the social-networking website Myspace, under the alias "Cameron Ugh".

== Career ==
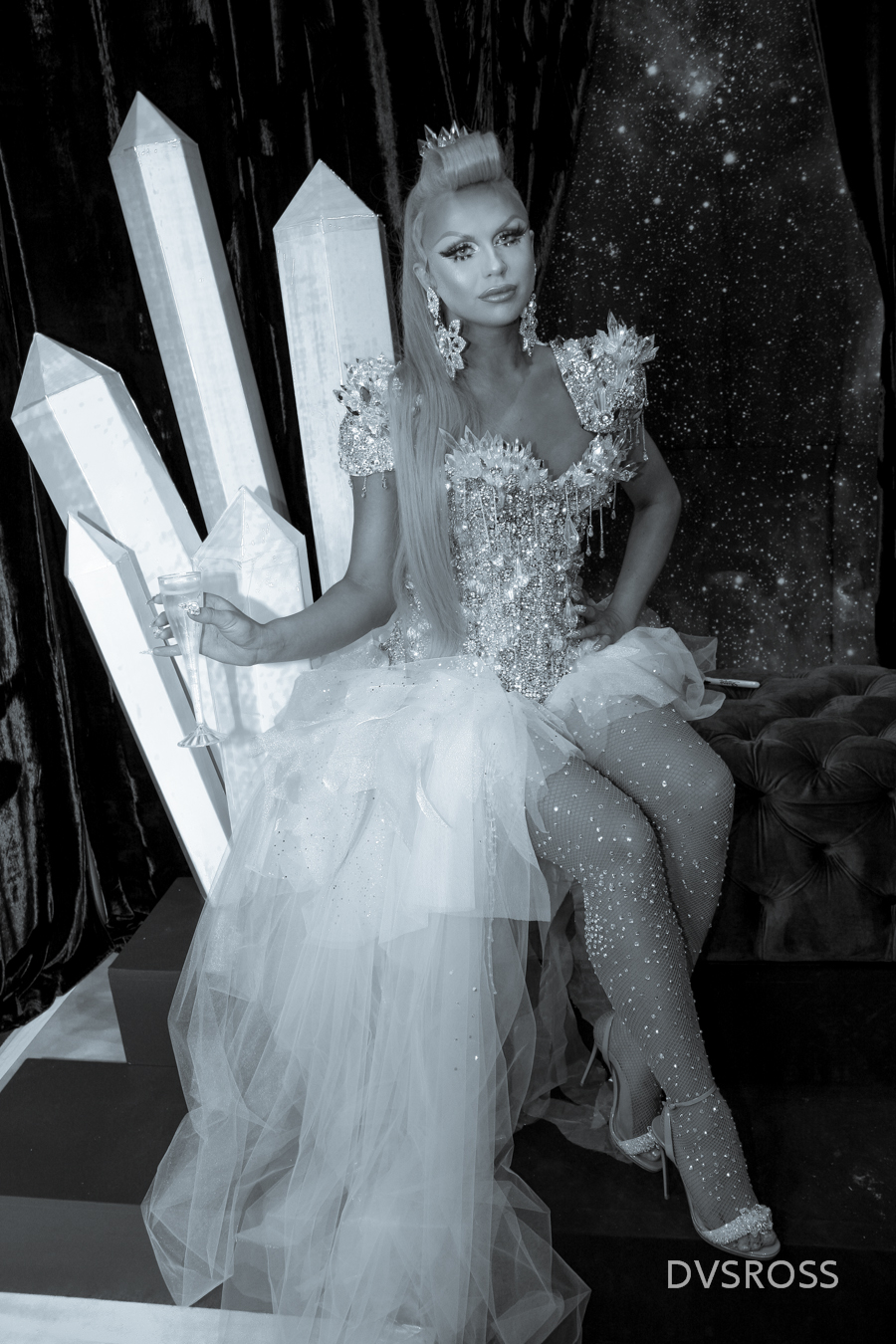
Farrah Moan at RuPaul's DragCon LA in 2018

Farrah Moan's first major performance was as part of a contest entitled "Austin's Next Drag Superstar", where she was placed as a runner-up. Whilst working in Austin, fellow Drag Race contestant Cynthia Lee Fontaine was supportive of Clayton, and helped her get booked at local venues. Farrah Moan has said that her biggest inspirations in drag are Christina Aguilera and RuPaul. On February 2, 2017, Logo TV announced that Farrah Moan would participate as a contestant in the ninth season of American reality competition RuPaul's Drag Race. The season premiered on March 24, 2017. Following her poor performance in a roast of the show's judge Michelle Visage, Farrah Moan lost a lip-sync showdown against Alexis Michelle and was eliminated from the competition, placing eighth overall. In a 2023 interview, Farrah Moan noted that immediately prior to arriving on set she had been homeless. She recounted that "my motivation for staying each episode was to have food and a bed for myself to sleep in".

Farrah Moan was referenced in the first episode of season ten of Drag Race, with RuPaul misleading the queens into thinking she returned, to reveal Christina Aguilera, one of her idols, instead. Farrah Moan was brought in by the shows producers to meet Aguilera for a Drag Race bonus clip. In September 2018, Farrah Moan performed as a background dancer behind Aguilera for Opening Ceremony's Spring 2019 collection, with other Drag Race alumni.

Farrah Moan photographed with Shea Couleé for Manny MUA's Lunar Beauty palette.

On November 9, 2018, it was announced that Farrah Moan would be one of the contestants competing in the fourth season of RuPaul's Drag Race: All Stars. After narrowly surviving the first episode's variety show, where she was up for elimination together with Jasmine Masters, Farrah Moan was eliminated by Valentina in the second episode. Farrah Moan returned in episode 6 for a chance to compete again, but lost a lip sync to Valentina, being once again eliminated by her. Farrah Moan placed 9th overall. She appeared as a guest for the first challenge in the premiere of season 11 of Drag Race.

Farrah Moan had a cameo appearance in Men.com's scene Girls Night Part 3.

== Personal life ==
Currently, Clayton resides and works in Los Angeles, California.

In 2018, Clayton and fellow season 9 contestant Shea Couleé were involved in a verbal altercation with a woman at a kebab shop in Newcastle upon Tyne, England after she began directing homophobic slurs at the pair.

Clayton is a trans woman. In December 2023, during an interview with Maddy Morphosis, she came out as transgender and revealed that she had begun her transition nearly five years prior, in 2019.

== Filmography ==
=== Television ===
Year	Title	Role	Notes	Ref.
2017	RuPaul's Drag Race	Herself	Contestant (8th Place)	
2017	RuPaul's Drag Race: Untucked	Herself	Spin-off series on WOWPresents	
2017	Watch What Happens Live with Andy Cohen	Lisa Vanderpump	Guest	
2018	The Trixie & Katya Show	Herself (Guest)	Army of Queens	
2018	RuPaul's Drag Race All Stars	Herself	Contestant (9th Place)	

=== Music videos ===
Year	Title	Artist
2017	"Expensive"	Todrick Hall
2019	"Flexin"	Issues
2022	"GAGA"	Grace Gaustad

=== Web series ===
Year	Title	Role	Notes	Ref.
2017	Drag Queen Carpool	Herself	Guest	
2017	Drag Makeup Tutorial	Herself	Guest	
2017	Whatcha Packin'	Herself	Guest	
2017	Queen to Queen	Herself	Guest, with Kimora Blac	
2018	Cosmo Queens	Herself	Guest	
2019	The Pit Stop	Herself	Season 11 – Episode 1	
2019	Huda Boss	Herself	Season 2 – Episode 4	
2026	The Kelly Mantle Show	Herself	Guest	

- Tongue Thai'd (2024)
