= She Done Already Done Brought It On =

- RuPaul's Drag Race episode
- Episode no.: Season 9 Episode 2
- Presented by: RuPaul
- Original air date: March 17, 2017

Guest appearances
- Kate Pierson, Fred Schneider, and Cindy Wilson of The B-52s; Lisa Kudrow

Episode chronology
← Previous "Oh. My. Gaga!"	Next → "Draggily Ever After"
- RuPaul's Drag Race season 9

"She Done Already Done Brought It On" is the second episode of the ninth season of the American television series RuPaul's Drag Race. It originally aired on March 17, 2017. The episode's main challenge tasks contestants with participating in a cheerleading competition. Lisa Kudrow makes a guest appearance and Kate Pierson, Fred Schneider, and Cindy Wilson of The B-52s are guest judges. Valentina wins the main challenge. Jaymes Mansfield is eliminated from the competition after placing in the bottom two and losing a lip-sync contest against Kimora Blac to "Love Shack" by The B-52s.

== Episode ==
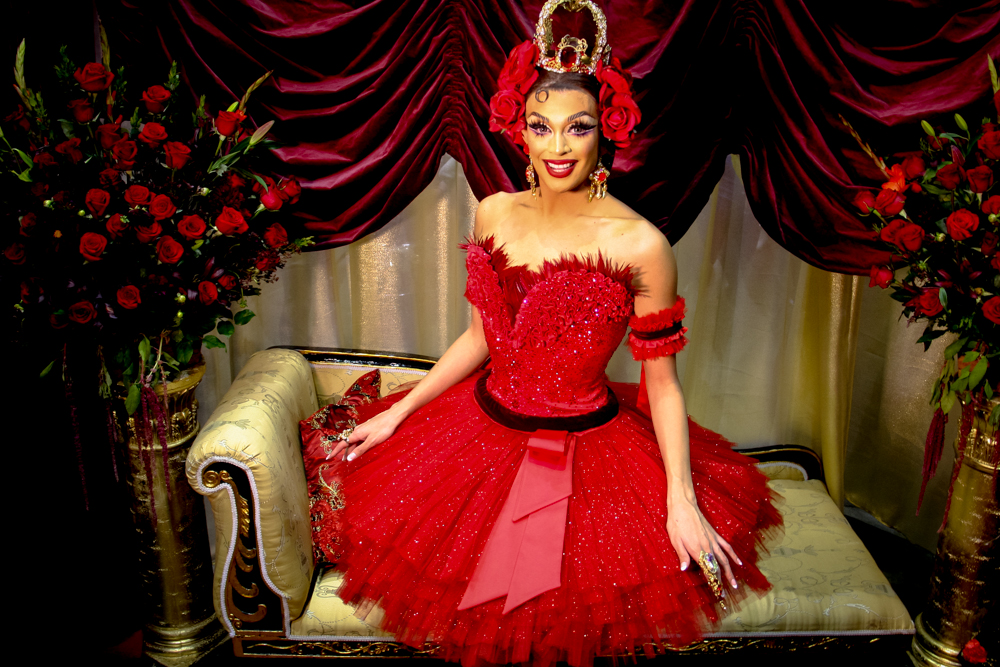
Valentina (pictured at RuPaul's DragCon LA in 2017) wins the episode's main challenge.

The contestants enter the Werk Room after Cynthia Lee Fontaine's return to the competition. RuPaul greets and contestants and Lisa Kudrow makes a guest appearance. RuPaul then reveals the main challenge, which tasks contestants with participating in a cheerleading competition. RuPaul selects Cynthia Lee Fontaine and Nina Bo'nina Brown as captains, who then pick team members. Team B-52 Bombers includes Cynthia Lee Fontaine, Eureka, Farrah Moan, Kimora Blac, Peppermint, Trinity Taylor, and Valentina. Aja, Alexis Michelle, Charlie Hides, Jaymes Mansfield, Nina Bo'nina Brown, Sasha Velour, and Shea Couleé are on Team RuPaul's Glamazons.

The groups decide their roles, then start to rehearse in the Werk Room before practicing with a stunt coach. The contestants also get into their cheerleading uniforms. Peppermint discusses her experience being beaten up in high school, for which she received community support. Cynthia Lee Fontaine discusses her battle with liver cancer and health status. The contestants prepare for the fashion show.

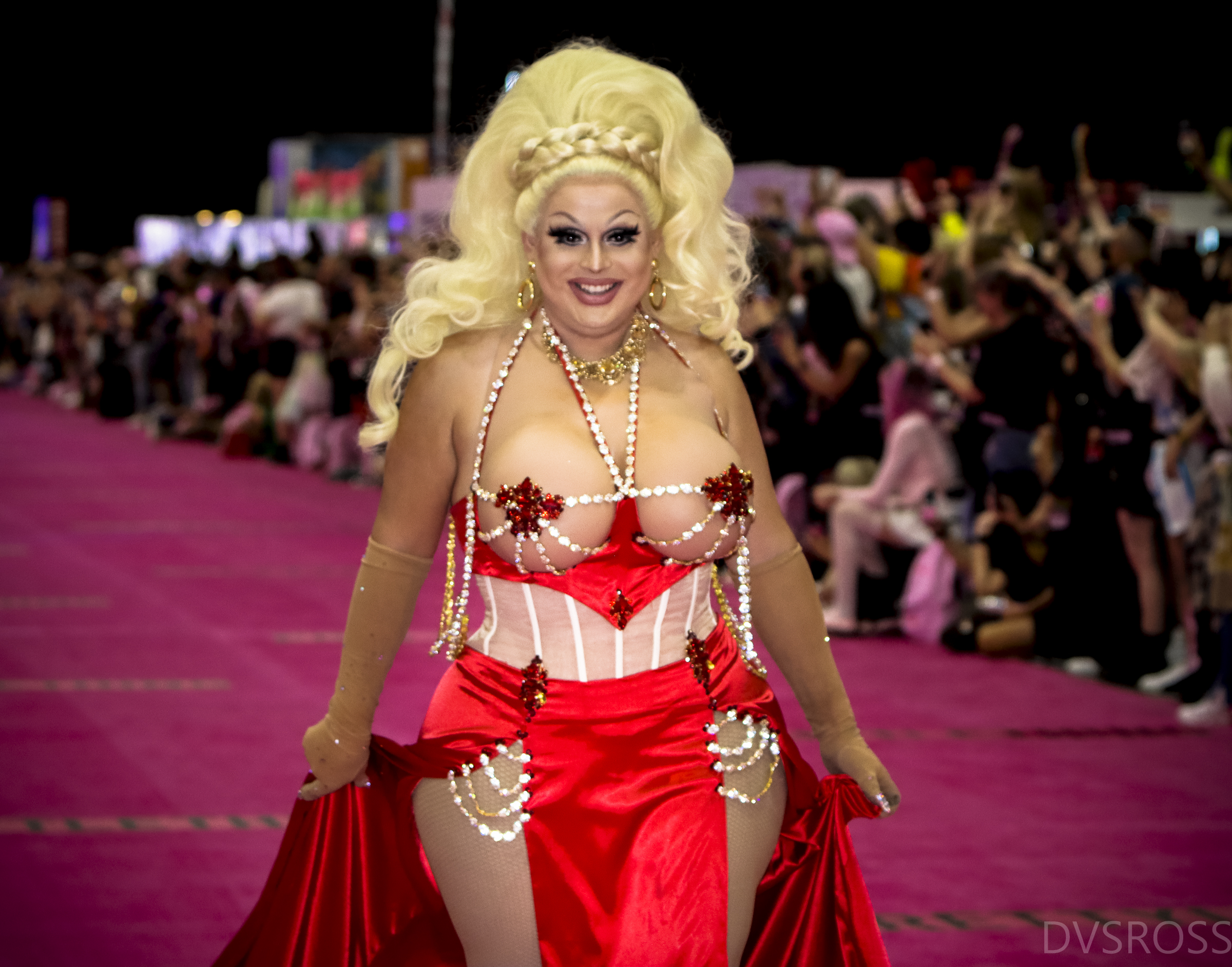
Jaymes Mansfield (pictured at RuPaul's DragCon LA in 2022) is eliminated from the competition.

On the main stage, RuPaul welcomes fellow judge Michelle Visage, as well as guest judges Kate Pierson, Fred Schneider, and Cindy Wilson of The B-52s. The contestants perform the cheerleading routine, during which Ross Mathews offers commentary. Eureka injures her knee during the performance. RuPaul reveals the runway category ("White Party Realness") and the contestants present their looks. The judges deliver their critique, deliberate, then share the results with the group. Valentina is deemed the winner of the main challenge. Jaymes Mansfield and Kimora Blac place in the bottom two and face off in a lip-sync contest to "Love Shack" (1989) by The B-52s. Kimora Blac wins the lip-sync and Jaymes Mansfield is eliminated from the competition.

== Production and broadcast ==
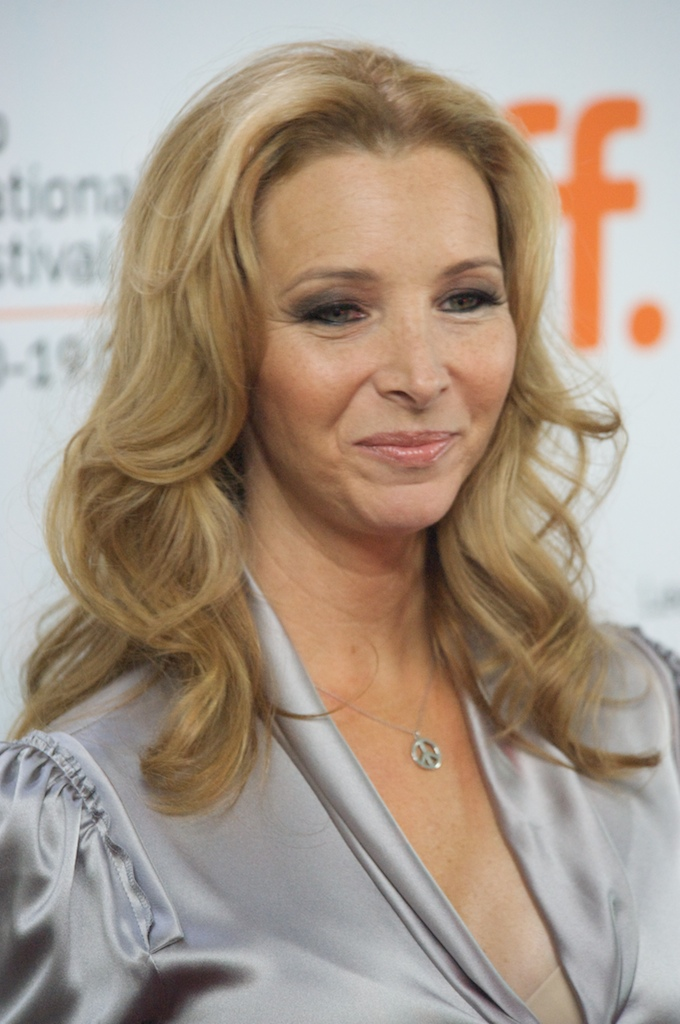
Lisa Kudrow (pictured in 2009) makes a guest appearance.

The episode originally aired on March 17, 2017,

Jaymes Mansfield has said of the lip-sync song: "I worked in a department store for years and immediately associated 'Love Shack' with being back at work. It was not my ideal choice. I usually like songs that have more narrative and story to it. I wish I got 'Rock Lobster.' That would be have been a great B-52s song for me." Her exit line from the main stage is "I came in first!", which PinkNews has called "iconic".

=== Fashion ===
For the main challenge, Team B-52 Bombers wear purple-and-white cheerleading uniforms. Team RuPaul's Glamazons wear orange-and-white uniforms.

For the fashion show, Nina Bo'nina Brown wears a blonde wig. Alexis Michelle has a white gown. Shea Couleé presents a 1960s-inspired outfit. Charlie Hides has a hood and Sasha Velour has a short wig. Aja wears a white mask, which she removes. Jaymes Mansfield presents a "campy" look with a blonde wig. Cynthia Lee Fontaine has a jeweled dress and a fascinator. Farrah Moan also wears a headpiece. Valentina wears a wedding dress and nude shoes. She carries a flower bouquet. Trinity Taylor's dress has large ruffles and she wears a short wig. Kimora Blac has gold jewelry, gold gloves, and a sailor hat. Peppermint presents an outfit inspired by Elvis Presley. Eureka O'Hara has a tall blonde wig.

== Reception ==
Oliver Sava of The A.V. Club gave the episode a rating of 'C' and said it "suffers from some unfortunate decisions, mostly in the editing department". She wrote, "I've long considered the editing on this show to be one of its strongest features, but the editing on tonight's episode makes the main challenge very unbalanced, strips the tension from the storytelling, and ventures into offensive territory during one particularly cringe-worthy scene." Jason Mecchi included the cheerleading competition in Screen Rant's 2021 list of the show's ten most difficult maxi challenges, and said: "While dance and cheerleading may seem similar, this challenge reveals the differences between the two, as even the cast's seasoned dancers struggle to keep up. The routines turned out well, but the practice and performance took their toll on the cast, proving that cheerleading takes plenty of time to master." The website's Mariana Fernandes included "Love Shack" in a 2020 list of the show's ten worst lip-syncs, writing: "The queens were lip-synching to 'Love Shack' in front of the B52s themselves, and yet, they completely failed to impress. None of them knew how to move and it was an overall disappointment." Teen Vogue's Michael Cuby said Jaymes Mansfield's "ditzy persona failed to translate".
