= Oh. My. Gaga! =

- RuPaul's Drag Race episode
- Episode no.: Season 9 Episode 1
- Directed by: Nick Murray
- Presented by: RuPaul
- Original air date: March 24, 2017

Guest appearance
- Lady Gaga

Episode chronology
← Previous "Grande Finale"	Next → "She Done Already Done Brought It On"
- RuPaul's Drag Race season 9

"Oh. My. Gaga!" is the first episode of the ninth season of the American television series RuPaul's Drag Race. It originally aired on March 24, 2017. The episode's main challenge tasks contestants with presenting two looks in a fashion show—one representing their home town and one inspired by Lady Gaga, who appears as a guest judge. The episode does not have a lip-sync contest and no contestant is eliminated. It earned two awards from four nominations at the 69th Primetime Emmy Awards.

== Episode ==
The season's thirteen contestants—Alexis Michelle, Aja, Charlie Hides, Cynthia Lee Fontaine, Eureka, Farrah Moan, Jaymes Mansfield, Kimora Blac, Nina Bo'nina Brown, Peppermint, Sasha Velour, Shea Couleé, and Trinity Taylor—enter the Werk Room one a time. Lady Gaga joins the contestants; in one recorded segment, she offers commentary as her alter ego Ronnie. RuPaul greets the group and Lady Gaga advises the contestants. RuPaul announces no contestants will be eliminated in this episode and reveals the season's first challenge, in which contestants must present two looks in the Miss Charisma, Uniqueness, Nerve & Talent Pageant; one look will represent their home town and the other will be inspired by Lady Gaga.

The contestants select their work stations and start to prepare for the fashion show. On the main stage, RuPaul welcomes fellow panelists Michelle Visage, Carson Kresley, and Ross Mathews, as well as Lady Gaga. The fashion show commences, then the judges deliberate. Nina Bo'nina Brown is declared the winner of the challenge. RuPaul reveals a fourteenth contestants will enter the competition. The episode does not include a lip-sync contest and no contestant is eliminated.

== Production ==
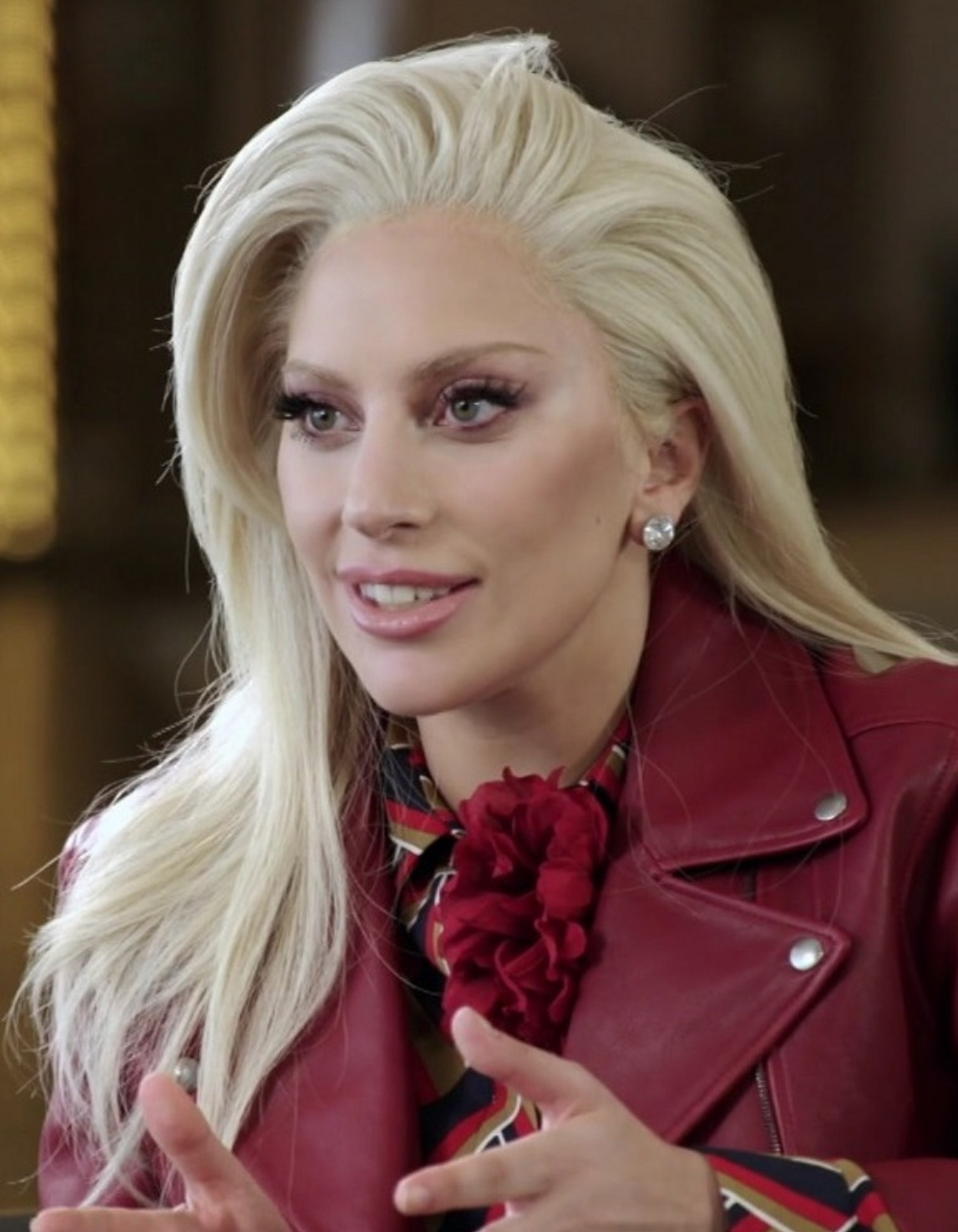
Lady Gaga is a guest judge.

"Oh. My. Gaga!" originally aired on March 24, 2017. It was directed by Nick Murray.

In this episode, Lady Gaga debuts as a special guest, though her songs had earlier been performed on the show. Her participation includes a recorded segment as her alter ego, Ronnie. Lady Gaga also appears in the corresponding episode of RuPaul's Drag Race: Untucked, setting a precedent for appearing backstage with the contestants. Peppermint later said: "Lady Gaga seemed to do something unusual and make it a point to come back and connect with us. It seemed as though she was genuinely touched that we had put so much into these tribute looks to her."

=== Fashion ===
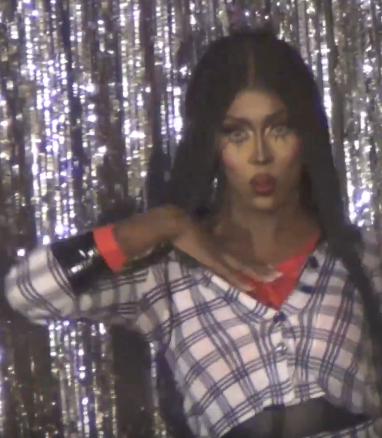
Nina Bo'nina Brown (pictured in 2018) is declared the winner of the episode's challenge.

For her entrance, Nina Bo'nina Brown wears a look inspired by Minnie Mouse. Perry Meek designed Lady Gaga's outfit for her guest appearance on the show; he designed three outfits for her and she selected one to wear.

For the pageant, Peppermint represents New York City and presents a Statue of Liberty-inspired outfit, as did Aja, who represents Brooklyn. Also representing New York City are Sasha Velour, who wears a yellow crown and carries an Andy Warhol-inspired portrait, and Alexis Michelle, who wears a white dress upon which phrases, including "Black Lives Matter", are written. Valentina represents East Los Angeles with a charro-inspired look that includes a sombrero. Representing Tennessee, Eureka carries a doll and wears cigarettes in her hair. Charlie Hides represents Massachusetts by dressing as a pilgrim. Representing Las Vegas are Farrah Moan with a showgirl look, and Kimora Blac with a black outfit with a large headpiece. Shea Couleé wears a red outfit with a hot dog headpiece, representing Chicago. Representing Orlando, Florida, Trinity Taylor has large, colorful outfit. Representing Milwaukee, Jaymes Mansfield wears a black-and-white outfit with a cow print. Representing Georgia, Nina Bo'nina Brown's face resembles a peach.

For the Lady Gaga-inspired look, Peppermint wears a blue David Bowie-esque outfit with orange hair, referencing Lady Gaga's look at the 58th Annual Grammy Awards in 2016. Valentina's black outfit, blue hair, and sunglasses reference Lady Gaga's look at the Council of Fashion Designers of America (CDFA) Awards in 2011. Eureka recreates Lady Gaga's look from the music video for "Telephone" (2010). Charlie Hides wears a white dress with a tall, blonde wig, recreating Lady Gaga's look at the Brit Awards 2010. Farrah Moan's white outfit with a red cross recreates Lady Gaga's look in the "Alejandro" (2010) music video. Sasha Velour black-and-white outfit and colorful makeup recreates a look from the "Applause" (2013) music video. Alexis Michelle wears a black gown and a blonde wig, recreating a Donatella Versace-designed outfit Lady Gaga wore to the 73rd Golden Globe Awards in 2016. Shea Couleé also wears a white dress and a blonde wig, recreating a look designed by Jim Henson for The Monster Ball Tour. Trinity Taylor wears a white dress and a blonde wig, inspired by Lady Gaga's character in the television series American Horror Story: Hotel. Kimora Blac wears an "on the go" black outfit. Jaymes Mansfield's purple dress and blonde wig recreate Lady Gaga's look on the cover of Vogue. Nina Bo'nina Brown wears a pink outfit that has lace covering her face and body, recreating Lady Gaga's Alexander McQueen-inspired look at the 2009 MTV Video Music Awards. Aja wears a blue-and-gray dress that recreates one of Lady Gaga's outfits designed by Comme des Garçons.

== Reception and recognition ==
Oliver Sava of The A.V. Club gave "Oh. My. Gaga!" a rating of "B+". Eric Henderson of Slant Magazine wrote: "Even lesser episodes of Drag Race go down like cotton candy, but this premiere lip-synced not for its life, nor the show's legacy".

The episode received almost a million viewers and was among the most-watched episodes in the show's history.

"Oh. My. Gaga!" won two awards from four nominations at the 69th Primetime Emmy Awards: Zaldy and Perry Meek won in the Outstanding Costumes for a Variety, Nonfiction, or Reality Programming category, and Jamie Martin, John Lim and Michael Roha won the Outstanding Picture Editing for a Structured Reality or Competition Program category. Hector Pocasangre was nominated in the Outstanding Hairstyling for a Variety, Nonfiction or Reality Program category, and Jen Fregozo, Nicole Faulkner and Natasha Marcelina were nominated in the Outstanding Makeup for a Variety, Nonfiction or Reality Program category.

== See also ==
- Lady Gaga videography
