= Draggily Ever After =

- RuPaul's Drag Race episode
- Episode no.: Season 9 Episode 3
- Presented by: RuPaul
- Original air date: April 7, 2017

Guest appearances
- Todrick Hall; Cheyenne Jackson

Episode chronology
← Previous "She Done Already Done Brought It On"	Next → "Good Morning Bitches"
- RuPaul's Drag Race season 9

"Draggily Ever After" is the third episode of the ninth season of the American television series RuPaul's Drag Race. It originally aired on April 7, 2017. The episode's main challenge tasks contestants with creating fairy tale versions of themselves. Todrick Hall and Cheyenne Jackson are guest judges. Trinity Taylor wins the main challenge and Kimora Blac is eliminated from the competition after placing in the bottom two and losing a lip-sync contest against Aja to "Holding Out for a Hero" by Bonnie Tyler.

== Episode ==
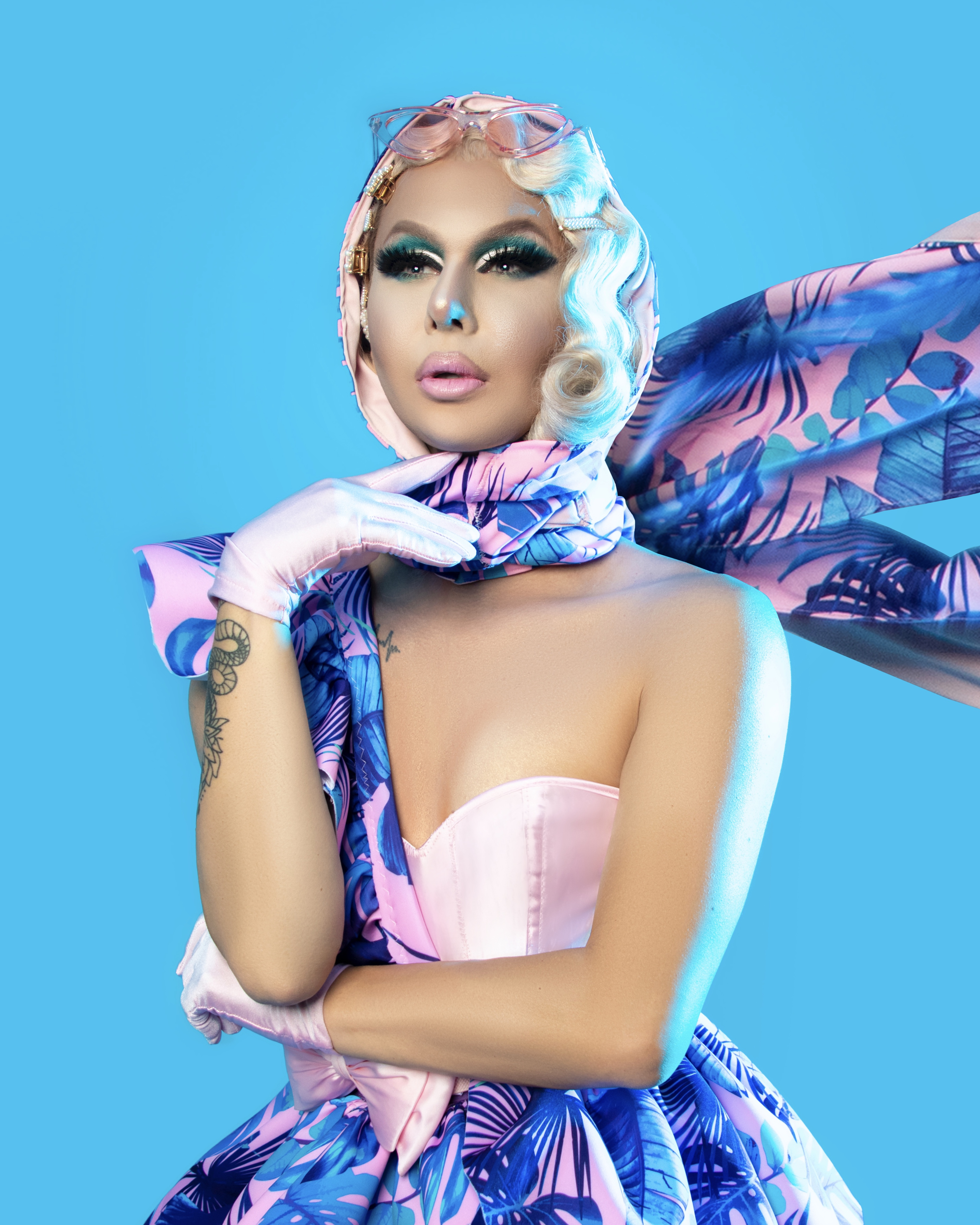
Trinity Taylor (pictured in 2020) wins the episode's main challenge.

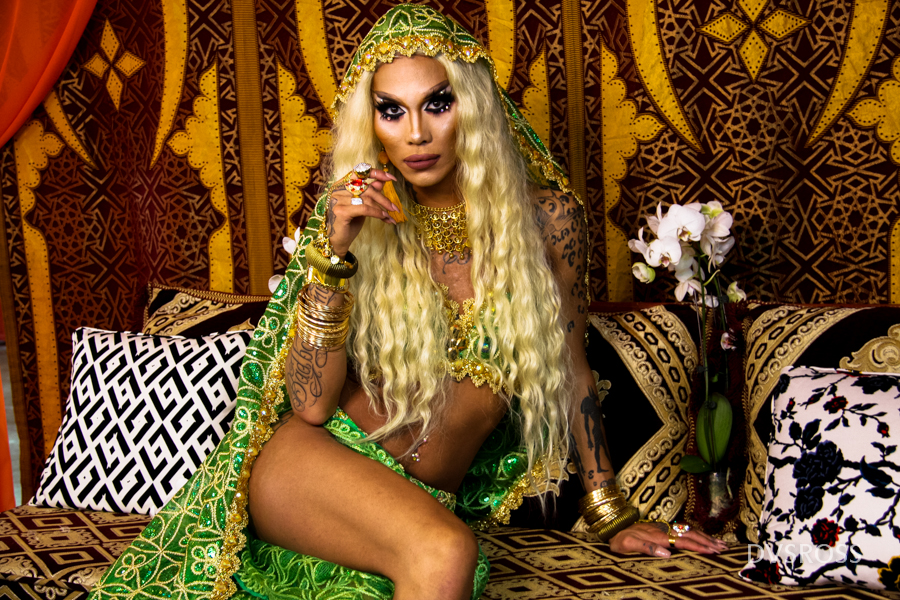
Kimora Blac (pictured at RuPaul's DragCon LA in 2018) is eliminated from the competition.

The contestants return to the Werk Room after Jaymes Mansfield's elimination on the previous episode. On a new day, RuPaul greets the group and reveals the main challenge, which tasks contestants with creating fairy tale versions of themselves. Competitors must create a name, a mythological background story, a "fantasy frock" for the main stage fashion show, and a "sassy" sidekick character. The contestants begin to create their concepts and outfits. RuPaul visits the group to meet with contestants individually and offer advice.

On elimination day, the contestants make final preparations for the fashion show. The group discuss the Pulse nightclub shooting and drag's role in the community. On the main stage, RuPaul welcomes fellow judges Michelle Visage and Carson Kressley, as well as guest judges Todrick Hall and Cheyenne Jackson. The fashion show commences. The contestants deliver their critiques, deliberate, then share the results with the group. Trinity Taylor is declared the winner of the main challenge. Aja and Kimora Blac place in the bottom and face off in a lip-sync contest to "Holding Out for a Hero" (1984) by Bonnie Tyler. Aja wins the lip-sync and Kimora Blac is eliminated from the competition.

== Production and broadcast ==
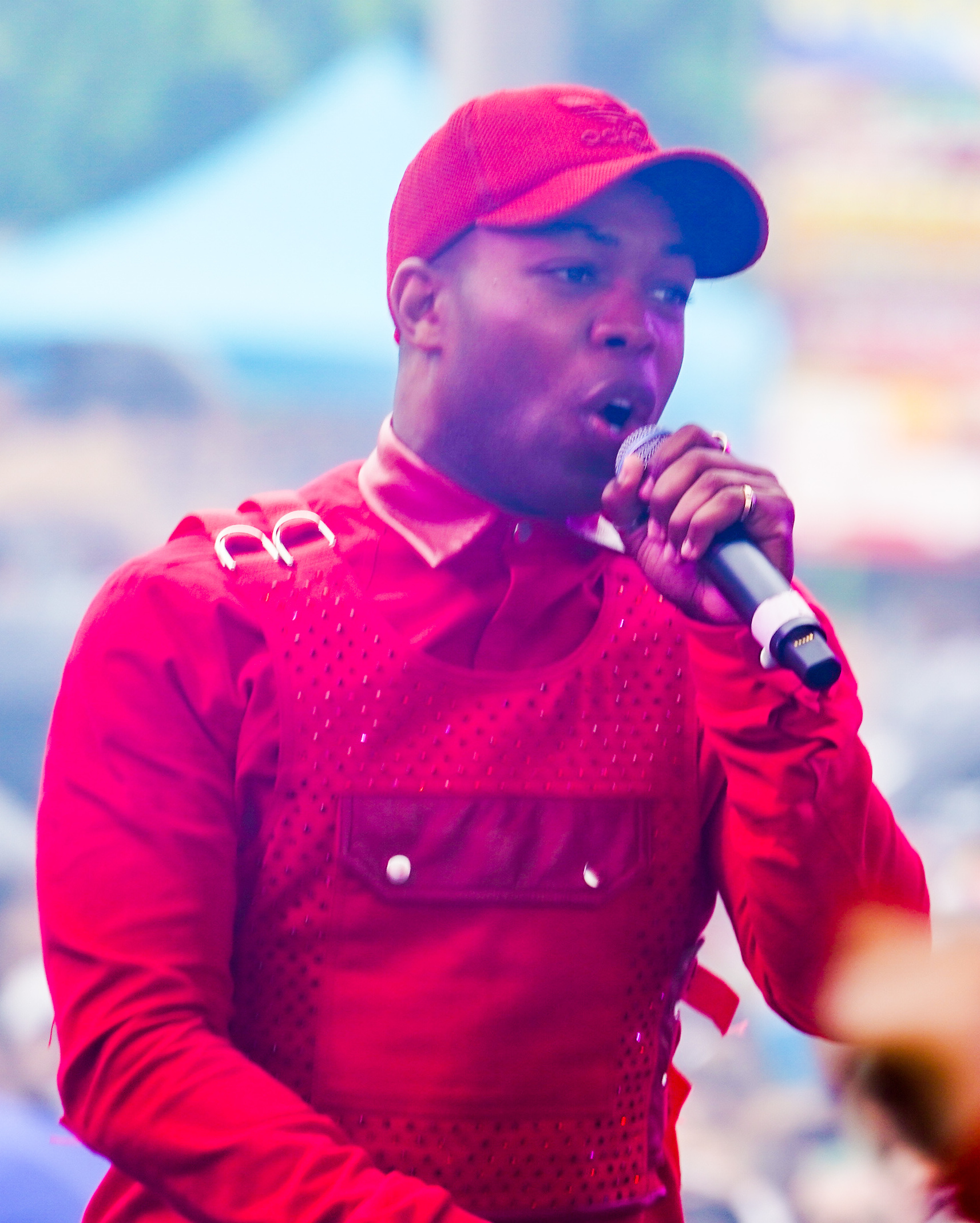
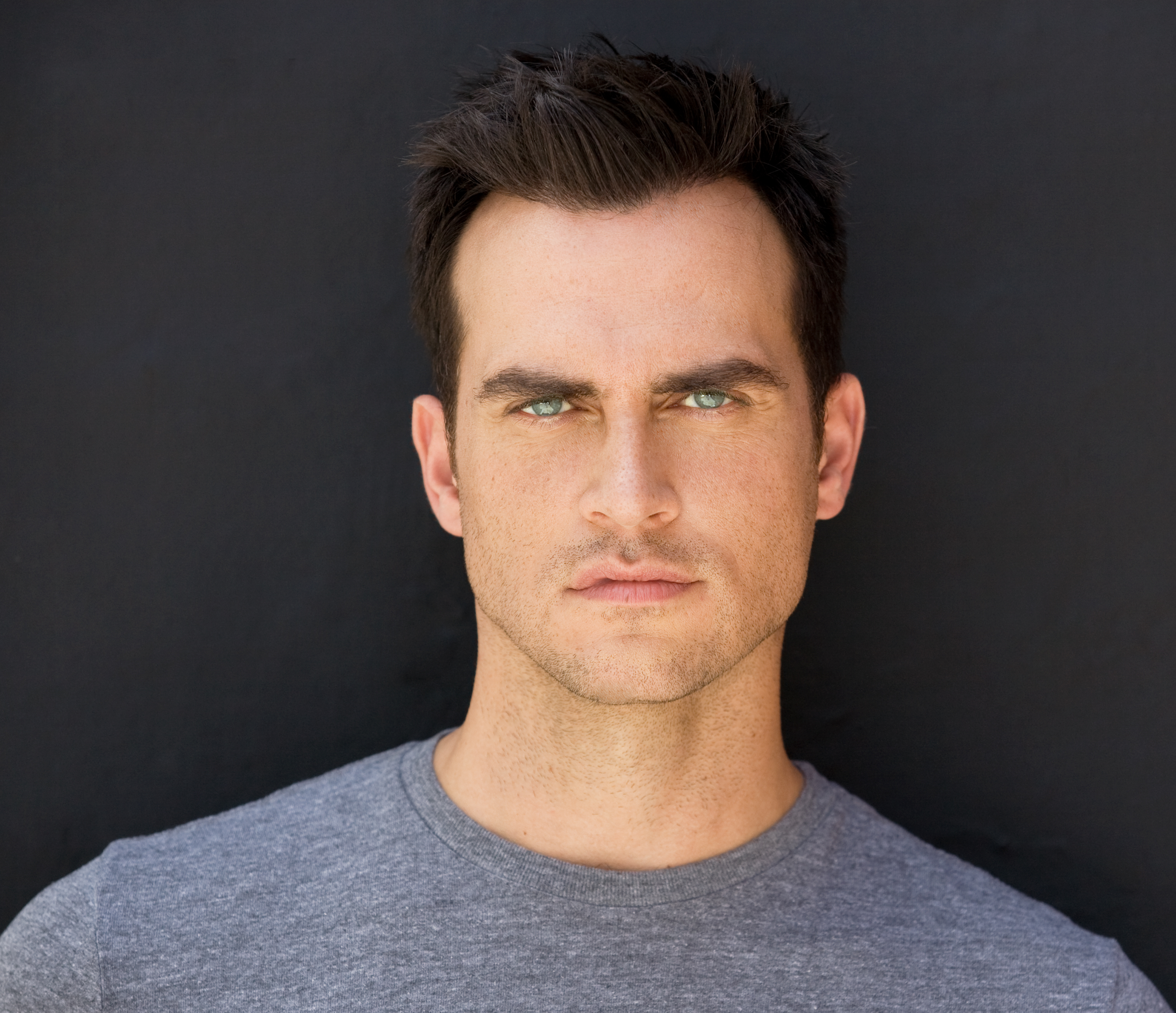
Todrick Hall (left, pictured in 2019) and Cheyenne Jackson (right) are guest judges.

The episode originally aired on April 7, 2017. It was filmed shortly after the Pulse nightclub shooting, which occurred in Orlando, Florida, in 2016.

Jackson also makes a guest appearance in the episode "Evil Twins".

=== Fashion and concepts ===
In the Werk Room, RuPaul wears a suit with a leopard print. Valentina wears a headwrap and sunglasses.

For the fashion show, Cynthia Fee Fontaine wears a pink dress and a large headpiece. Peppermint has a fire-themed outfit. Farrah Moan ("Princess Pacifica") has a blue outfit with fake starfish attached. She wears a blue wig. Charlie Hides carries a wand and has a blonde wig. Eureka O'Hara has a fake rat on her shoulder. Alexis Michelle has fake crabs attached to her dress. Kimora Black ("Princess Banana Lady") has white boots. Nina Bo'nina Brown ("Princess Zathena") has a silver extraterrestrial-inspired look. Sasha Velour ("Princess Uglina") has a birdcage on the top of her head. Her outfit is white with red accents. Shea Coulee ("Princess Aquaria") has a blue outfit and a red wig. Valentina ("Princess Vira") has a curly blonde wig. Aja ("Princess Disastah") has an orange outfit and matching wig. Trinity Taylor has a headpieces and a light blue wig. Her sidekick is "Stanky the Starfish".

== Reception ==
Oliver Sava of The A.V. Club gave the episode a rating of 'B+'. Screen Rant included Valentina's look in a 2021 overview of the ten best "drag on a dime" runway looks, and said her look drew comparisons to Linda Evangelista by the judges. The website also said, "Valentina's Princess Vira look was reminiscent of a beautiful ice princess or a whimsical fairy. The construction was on point with not a stitch out of place. Plus, the monochromaticity of the look added to the ethereal quality of the outfit." Bryan Moylan of Vice.com said Kimora Blac "looked like she never bothered to learn the words" for the lip-sync. Sam Brooks ranked the performance number 103 in The Spinoff's 2019 "definitive ranking" of the show's 162 lip-syncs to date.
