= Evil Twins (RuPaul's Drag Race) =

- RuPaul's Drag Race episode
- Episode no.: Season 10; Episode 11
- Presented by: RuPaul
- Original air date: June 7, 2018

Guest appearances
- Ashanti (guest judge); Lena Dunham (guest judge); Cheyenne Jackson

Episode chronology
← Previous "Social Media Kings Into Queens"	Next → "American"
- RuPaul's Drag Race season 10

"Evil Twins" is the eleventh episode of the tenth season of the American television series RuPaul's Drag Race. It originally aired on June 7, 2018. The episode's main challenge tasks the contestants with presenting two characters. Ashanti and Lena Dunham are guest judges. Cheyenne Jackson also makes a guest appearance for the mini-challenge. Miz Cracker is eliminated from the competition after placing in the bottom and losing a lip-sync contest against Kameron Michaels to "Nasty Girl" (1982) by Vanity 6.

== Episode ==
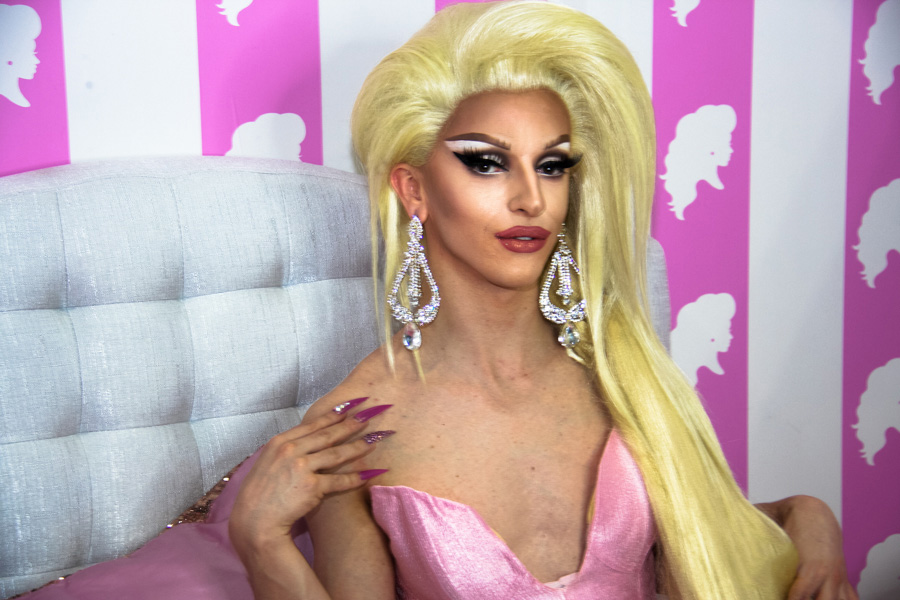
Miz Cracker (pictured at RuPaul's DragCon LA in 2018) is eliminated from the competition.

The contestants return to the Werk Room after Monét X Change's elimination on the previous episode. On a new day, RuPaul and guest Cheyenne Jackson greet the group and reveal the mini-challenge, which tasks the contestants with decorating pancakes. Asia O'Hara is declared the winner of the mini-challenge. RuPaul then reveals the main challenge, which tasks the contestants with presenting two characters on the runway (Best Self and Evil Twin), as well as developing inner dialogue for both.

The contestants have a discussion about their good and bad qualities. RuPaul returns to the Werk Room to meet with each contestant individually, asking questions and offering advice. Before leaving, RuPaul's "evil twin" "RudePaul" makes an appearance. RuPaul reveals that Ashanti and Lena Dunham are guest judges. On elimination day, the contestants make final preparations in the Werk Room for the fashion show. The contestants talk about their inner saboteurs as well as their confidence out of drag.

On the main stage, RuPaul welcomes fellow judges Michelle Visage and Carson Kressley, as well as guest judges Ashanti and Dunham. RuPaul reveals the assignment of the main challenge as well as the runway category ("Double Trouble"), then the fashion show commences. After the contestants present their looks, the judges deliver their critiques. RuPaul asks the contestants to share who they think should be eliminated from the competition and why. The judges deliberate, then share the results with the group. Aquaria is declared the winner of the main challenge. Kameron Michaels and Miz Cracker place in the bottom and face off in a lip-sync contest to "Nasty Girl" (1982) by the musical group Vanity 6. Kameron Michaels wins the lip-sync and Miz Cracker is eliminated from the competition. Miz Cracker returns to the Werk Room to write a message on the mirror for the remaining contestants.

== Production and broadcast ==
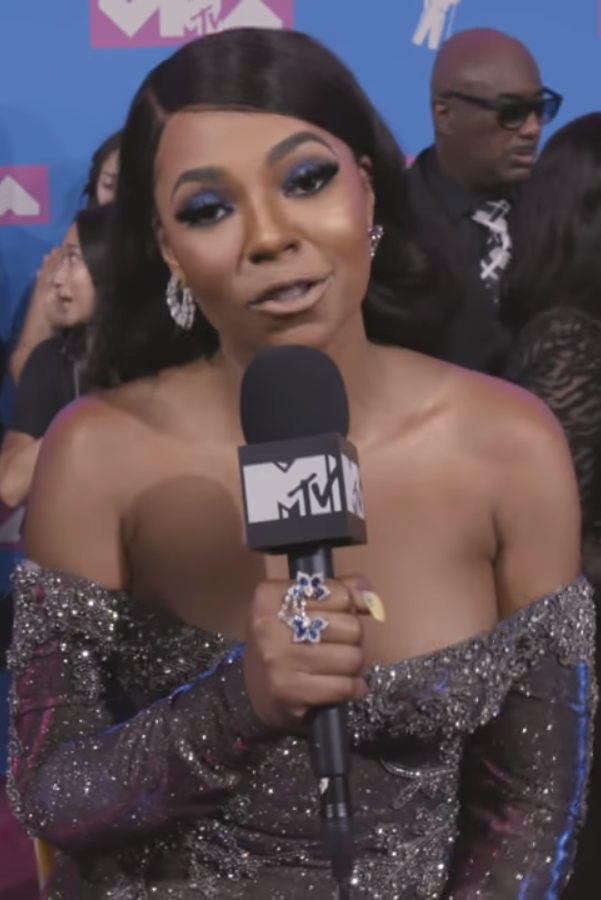
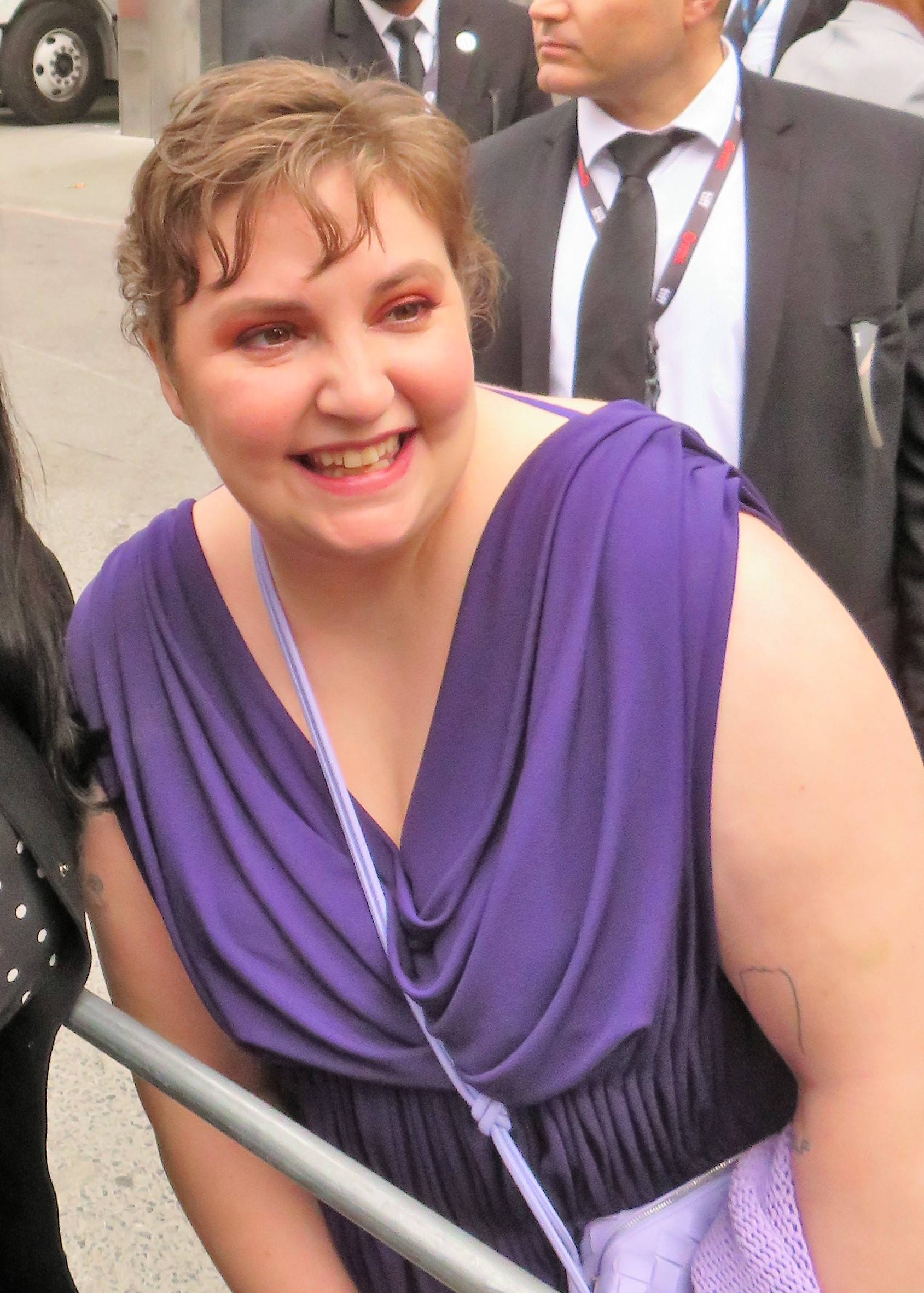
Ashanti (left) and Lena Dunham (right) are guest judges.

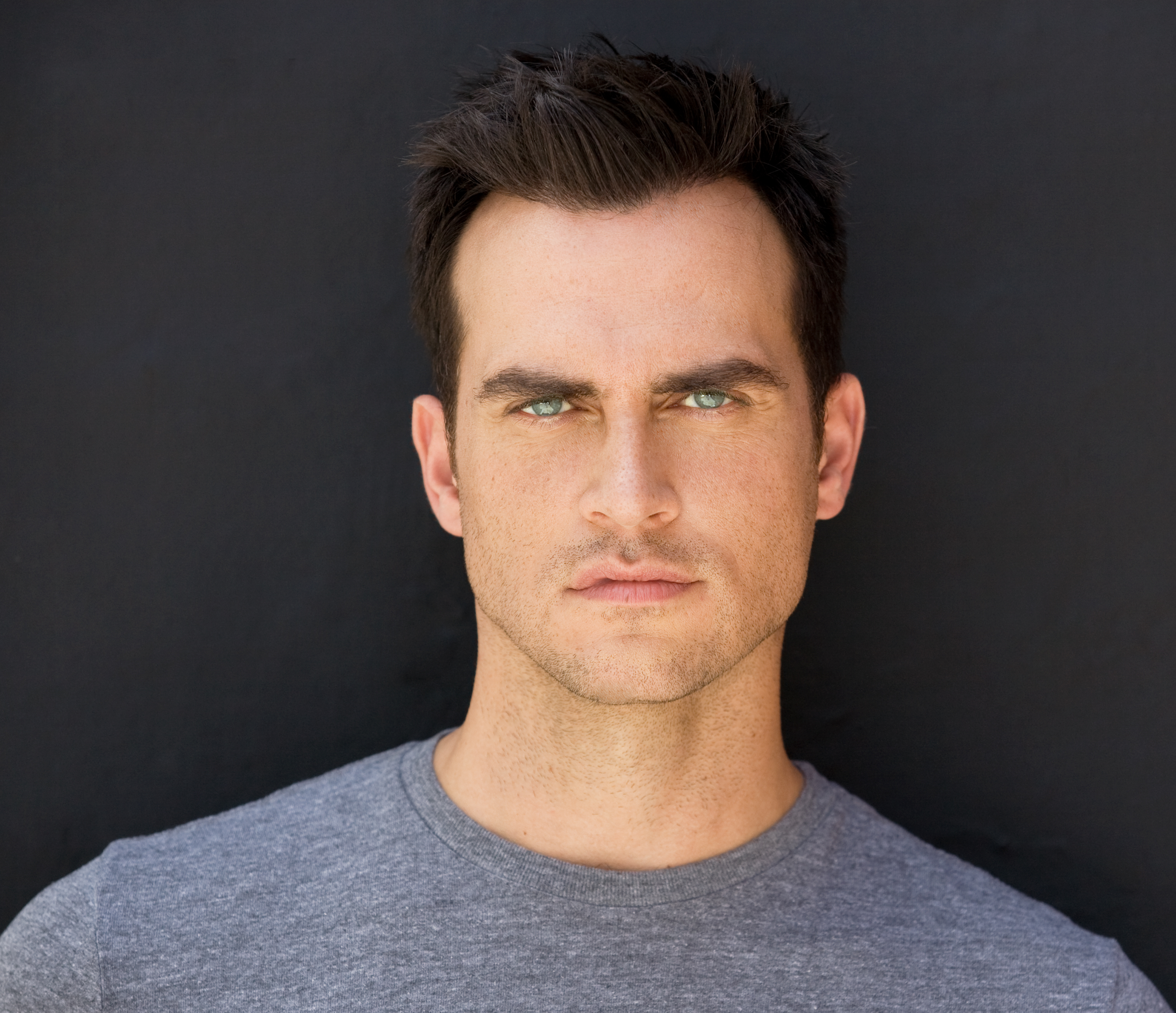
Cheyenne Jackson makes a guest appearance for the mini-challenge.

The episode originally aired on June 7, 2018.

For her good look, Kameron Michaels has boots with white fur and a blonde wig. For carries props for both looks. For her good look, Eureka has a pink plaid skirt and a yellow wig. For her evil look, she wears a green plaid dress, tall black boots, large black earrings, and a yellow wig. For her good look, Miz Cracker wears a long blue dress, matching high-heeled shoes, and a long pink wig. Her evil look is brown-and-tan, with a headpiece made from bones. For her good look, Aquaria has an asymmetrical lavender outfit and a matching hat, as well as tall green stockings. Her evil look has an animal print with matching boots, bone accessories, and a dark wig. For her good look, Asia O'Hara has an orange-and-white bodysuit with an orange wig. She carries orange balloons. For her evil look, she has a black outfit with matching footwear and no wig.

== Reception ==
Kate Kulzick of The A.V. Club gave the episode a rating of 'B'. Writing for Vulture, Matt Rogers and Bowen Yang rated the episode three out of five stars. Patrick Crowley of Billboard called the episode "a master class in editing, as the queens interacted with their evil twins throughout the challenge and during the judges’ deliberation". RuPaul received some criticism for a comment made on the episode. Matthew Rodriguez of INTO Magazine said both contestants offered "middling" performances during the lip-sync contest. Sam Brooks ranked the "Nasty Girl" performance number 111 in The Spinoff's 2019 "definitive ranking" of the show's 162 lip-syncs to date.

== See also ==
- "Draggily Ever After", another episode in which Jackson is a guest judge
