= Camp Wannakiki =

American reality television series

Camp Wannakiki is a drag competition series.

Drag performers Coco Jem Holiday and Jaymes Mansfield have appeared on the series.
