= Coco Jem Holiday =

American drag performer

- Occupations: Drag queen; events manager
- Television: Camp Wannakiki

Coco Jem Holiday is an African-American drag performer based in Portland, Oregon.

== Career ==
Coco Jem Holiday is a drag performer and events manager based in Portland, Oregon. Andrew Jankowski of the Portland Mercury has described her as "an enterprising queen, often seen twirling and serving grace and glamour with pop hits and old school ballads" with "a reputation as a kind, inclusive performer who always brings her all to the stage".

When she was based in Grand Junction, Colorado, she performed in 'Drag Your Butte to the Cabaret', which was presented by Crested Butte Mountain Theater in collaboration with the Crested Butte Library in 2018.

In Portland, Coco Jem Holliday has hosted a weekly drag bunch show at the defunct Local Lounge and performed at other local venues such as Rebel Rebel and The Queen's Head. In 2020, during the COVID-19 pandemic, she co-organized 'Introvert: Digital Drag Show', described as "a night of socially distant drag" featuring live and recorded performances by Flawless Shade, Mystique Summers Madison, and other artists. In 2022, Coco Jem Holiday performed at the Kennedy School as part of an event about the history of Black drag in Portland, in conjunction with Juneteenth and Pride Month. She also performed on the main stage of the city's pride festival, organized by Pride Northwest at Tom McCall Waterfront Park. Coco Jem Holliday produced the revue 'Black Magic' at CC Slaughters in 2023. In 2024, she co-hosted a drag brunch called 'Baddies on Belmont', as part of pride festivities. She also hosts a weekly party at Badlands Portland with dancing, karaoke, and trivia.

Coco Jem Holiday was a finalist on the second season of Camp Wannakiki, described by Jankowski as a YouTube competition series "where queens were judged on their comedic skills via summer camp challenges". She headlined the Austin International Drag Festival in 2023.

== Personal life ==
Previously, Coco Jem Holliday lived in Grand Junction and Orlando, Florida, where she worked at Walt Disney World.

== Filmography ==
- Camp Wannakiki (season 2)

== See also ==
- LGBTQ culture in Portland, Oregon
- List of drag queens
- List of people from Portland, Oregon
