= The Bitch Who Stole Christmas =

2021 American film

- Written by: Christina Friel; Connor Wright
- Directed by: Don Scardino
- Starring: Krysta Rodriguez; Anna Maria Horsford; RuPaul Charles
- Narrated by: Michelle Visage
- Music by: David Benjamin Steinberg; Leland; Gabe Lopez
- Country of origin: United States
- Original language: English

Production
- Producers: Fenton Bailey; Randy Barbato; Tom Campbell; Don Scardino
- Cinematography: Joe Kessler
- Editor: Craig Cobb
- Running time: 86 minutes
- Production companies: MTV Entertainment Studios; World of Wonder

Original release
- Network: VH1
- Release: December 2, 2021

The Bitch Who Stole Christmas (stylized as The B**** Who Stole Christmas) is a 2021 drag-themed Christmas comedy film featuring RuPaul and twenty RuPaul's Drag Race contestants, among other celebrities. The film, which aired on VH1 on December 2, 2021, is produced by MTV Entertainment Studios and World of Wonder. It was directed by Don Scardino and written by Connor Wright and Christina Friel.

== Plot ==
The film's official description reads: "In the draggiest Christmas movie ever made, a workaholic big-city fashion journalist is sent to a Christmas-obsessed small town to dig up a story when she finds herself in the middle of cut-throat housewives, a high-stakes "winter ball" competition, and a sinister plot that could destroy Christmas fore-evah!"

== Critical reception ==
Autostraddle described the film as a parody that failed as a drag showcase. Drew Burnett Gregory in his review argued that while the movie aimed for a campy, good time, it ultimately fell short, writing: “The Bitch Who Stole Christmas has all the makings of a campy good time, with a joke-filled script parodying Hallmark tropes and a cast featuring some of the best Drag Race alumni.”

For Queer Film Review, the film received a mixed assessment, with the review highlighting both strengths and weaknesses alongside its queer significance. Among the criticisms was the fact that the film starred a cisgender, white, heterosexual. On the positive side, the reviewer considered it an enjoyable watch. Regarding its queer relevance, the review noted that queerness is not central to the film's narrative; however, its connection to RuPaul, a queer icon, gives it cultural significance within queer media.

Writing for Decider, Brett White described the film as a “Stream It” or “Skip It.” In his review, he wrote: “Fortunately for the franchise’s first foray into the holiday TV movie genre, The Bitch Who Stole Christmas gives you exactly what you want when you hear ‘Drag Race holiday movie.’”

On Rotten Tomatoes, the film holds an 83% Popcornmeter score based on 50 audience ratings. It also received a Tomatometer score from critics, reflecting generally positive critical reception.

== Cast ==
- Krysta Rodriguez as Olivia St. LaPelle
- Andy Ridings as Big Russ
- Anna Maria Horsford as Mayor Coont
- RuPaul as Hannah Contour
- Michelle Visage as the Narrator/Herself
- Peppermint as Bea Eeep
- Brooke Lynn Hytes as Kitty Myau
- Ginger Minj as Hazel Delashes
- Jan Sport as Jane McBeige
- Jaymes Mansfield as Delia Von Whitewoman
- Victoria "Porkchop" Parker as Bertram
- Latrice Royale as The Spirit of Christmas
- Carson Kressley as Kreston Carsley
- Ross Mathews as Matt Rothews
- David Koechner as Mr. E
- Kim Petras as Herself
- Charo as Herself
- Morgan McMichaels as Lanette
- Tia Shipman as Young 1997 Hannah Contour
- Emilene Bell as Young Olivia St. LaPelle
- Heidi N Closet as Gorge Intern
- Gottmik as Tristian
- Raven as Shopping Lady
- Ian Delaney as Father
- Manila Luzon as Mother
- Mayhem Miller as Bus Driver
- Nadya Ginsburg as Barbara Walters' voice
- Laganja Estranja as Herself
- Rock M. Sakura as Toymaker
- Kelly Mantle as Madelyn/Wistful Woman
- Sutton Schultz as Little Lenny
- Chad Michaels as Cher
- Kylie Sonique Love as Dolly Parton
- Meiyee Apple Tam as Annoying Smart Girl
- Paul Kreppel as Cranky Old Man
- Joyce Greenleaf as Grandma
- Jackson Owens as Grandson
- Zack Cosby as Romantic Guy
- Samantha Perez as Hazel Stunt Double
- Nikkilette Wright as Mayor Stunt Double
- Nick Braga as Dancing Husband #1
- Montay Romero as Dancing Husband #2
- Brandon Mathis as Dancing Husband #3
- Mackenzie Green as Dancing Husband #4
- Grant Gilmore as Dancing Husband #5
- Ezra Sosa as Dancing Husband #6
- Kimora Blac as Townsfolk #1
- Nicola Graham as Townsfolk #2
- Pandora Boxx as Townsfolk #3
- Dominique Nicole Generaux as Townsfolk #4
- Bryan Carman as Townsfolk #5

== See also ==
- List of Christmas films
