= Austin International Drag Festival =

Annual drag event in Austin, Texas, U.S.

- Frequency: Annually
- Location: Austin, Texas
- Country: U.S.

The Austin International Drag Festival is an annual drag festival in Austin, Texas, United States. Coco Jem Holiday headlined the event in 2023.
