= Cheerleading uniform =

Type of clothing worn by cheerleaders

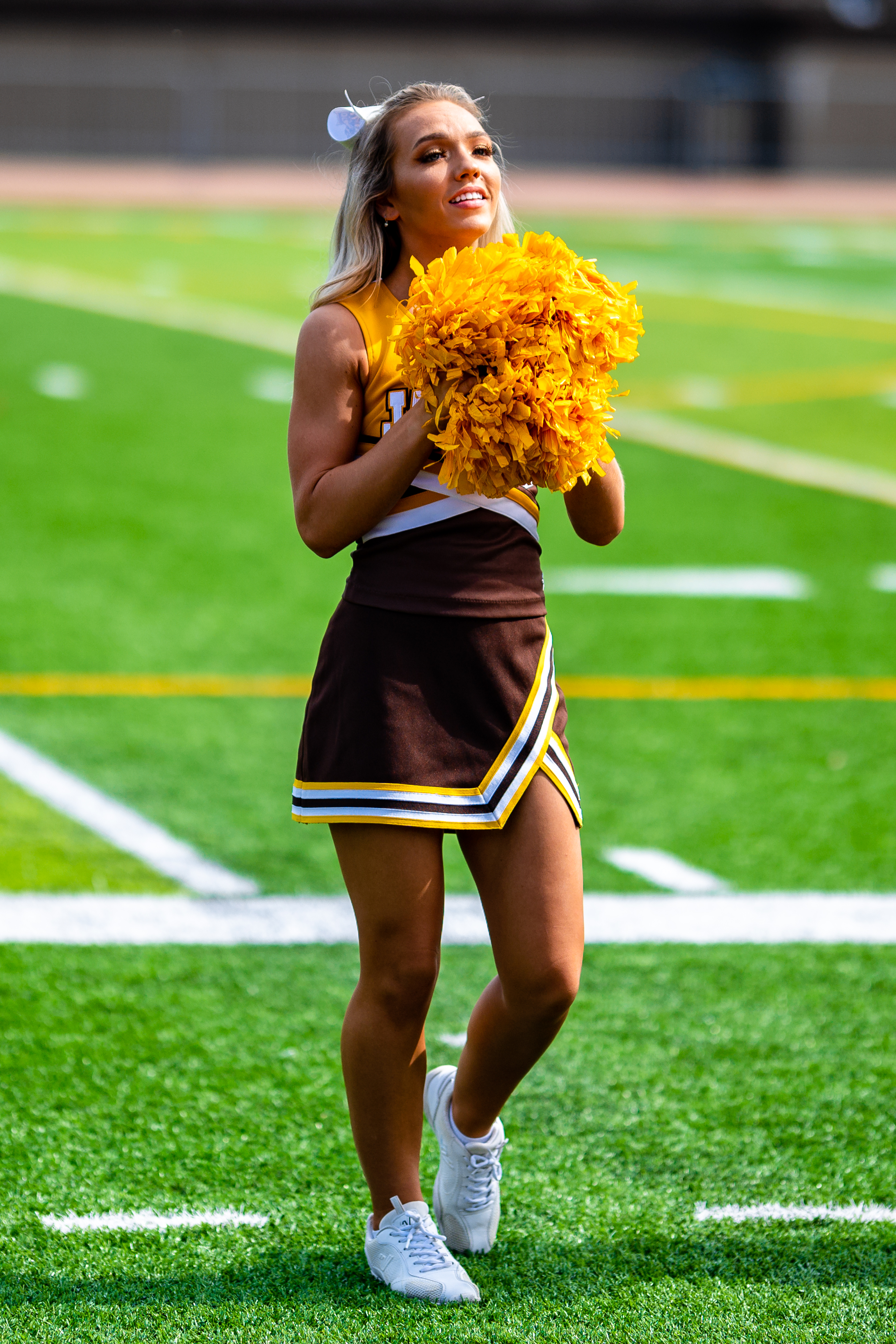
Cheerleading uniforms have changed over the years, both in form and style. (Baldwin Wallace University)

A cheerleading uniform is a standardized outfit worn by cheerleaders during games and other events. These uniforms typically include the official colors and mascots of the school or team and are designed to make the wearer appear physically attractive. Early cheerleading outfits had pants or long dresses, but as cheerleading stunts became more complex, cheerleader uniforms have adapted to allow better range of motion.

== Early styles/brief history ==
Cheerleading uniforms in the early 1900s were a steadfast symbol of the schools they represented, usually depicting the first letter of a high school or the first letter plus the letters "H" and "S", standing for "high school." These letters were normally sewn onto a sweater-type garment, sometimes even polo shirts in warm weather. While conducive to showing school spirit and having a uniform looking team, these sweater-tops were often hot, bulky, and not very functional for any type of athletic movement. The most common type of sweater worn by early cheerleaders was a long cardigan with multiple buttons, normally worn over a turtle neck shirt or collared blouse. The school letters were often sewn in either corner of the sweater, sometimes in the middle of a megaphone shape. Worn with the sweater was a very modest ankle-length wool skirt, often a darker color than the sweater. Some early cheerleading squads chose plaid fabrics for skirts, often these squads were from religious schools and universities, as plaid was the main fabric of their classroom uniforms.

Early cheerleading squads wore saddle shoes or flat canvas sneakers with high dress socks with their uniforms. This style of uniform continued through the 1950s and 1960s and is often depicted in movies and photos from that time period.

Jean Lee Originals in Goshen, IN became the first company to widely market cheerleading uniforms in the 1960s and 1970s. Owner, Jean Marie Harter, designed the pleated skirt and double stripe sweater styles still in use today. She was one of the first female graduates from The School of Management at Northwestern University and was the daughter of Arthur (Dad) V. Harter, owner of House of Harter Sporting Goods, the largest sporting good store in Indiana (and much of the Midwest) and supplier to most high schools and colleges in the state, including Notre Dame. All uniforms at Jean Lee Originals were custom made to fit each individual.

A larger entity - Cheerleader Supply Company, began copying Jean Lee's styles and mass producing uniforms in standard issue sizes (s, m, l), eventually putting the smaller, custom store out of business by the 1980s. The company was founded by Lawrence "Herkie" Herkimer, of Dallas, TX, a former cheerleader at Southern Methodist University, who began selling pom pom kits to local high schools. Herkie was also the first to organize cheerleading camps and competitions.

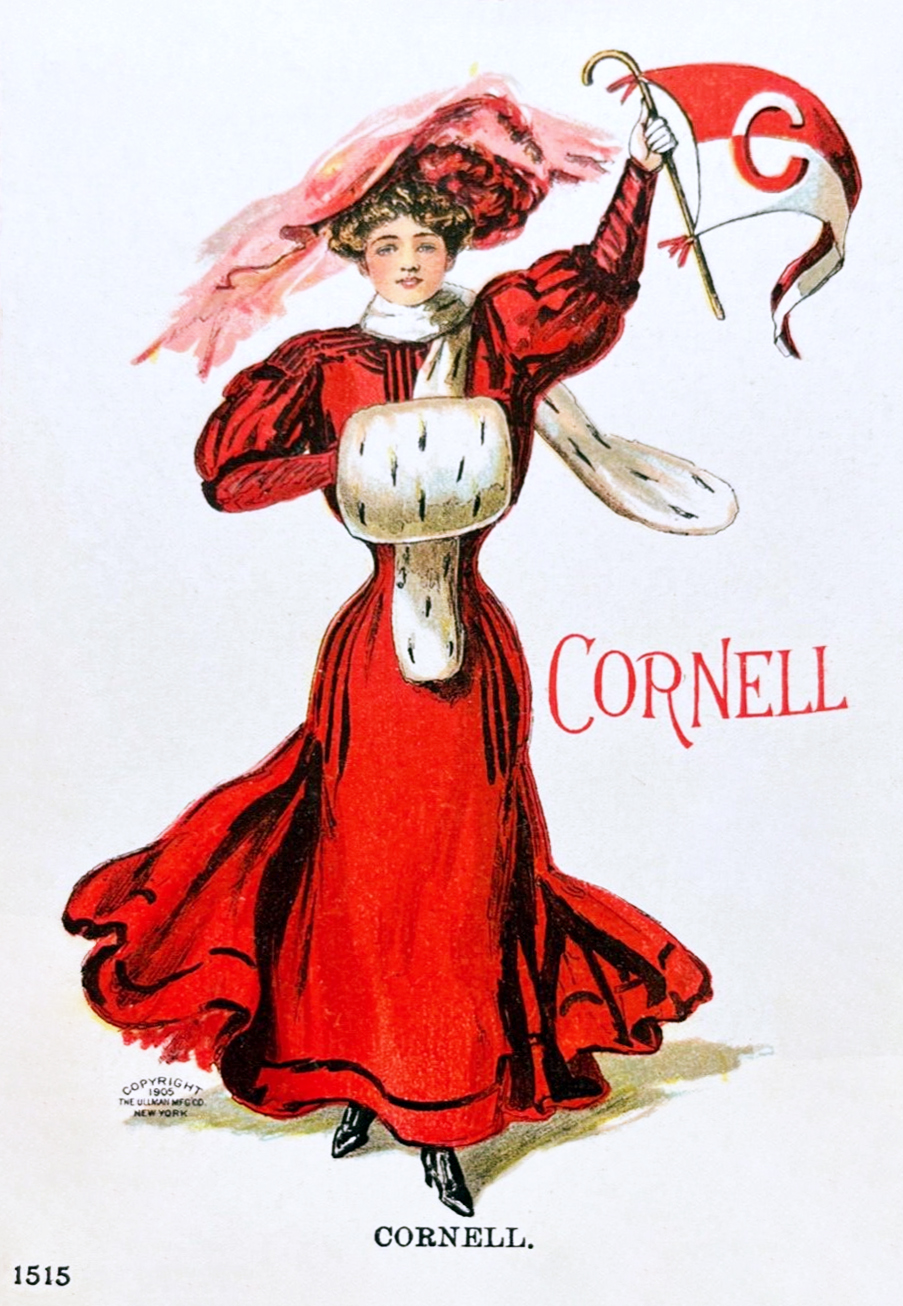
Cheerleader on a Cornell University postcard, 1905

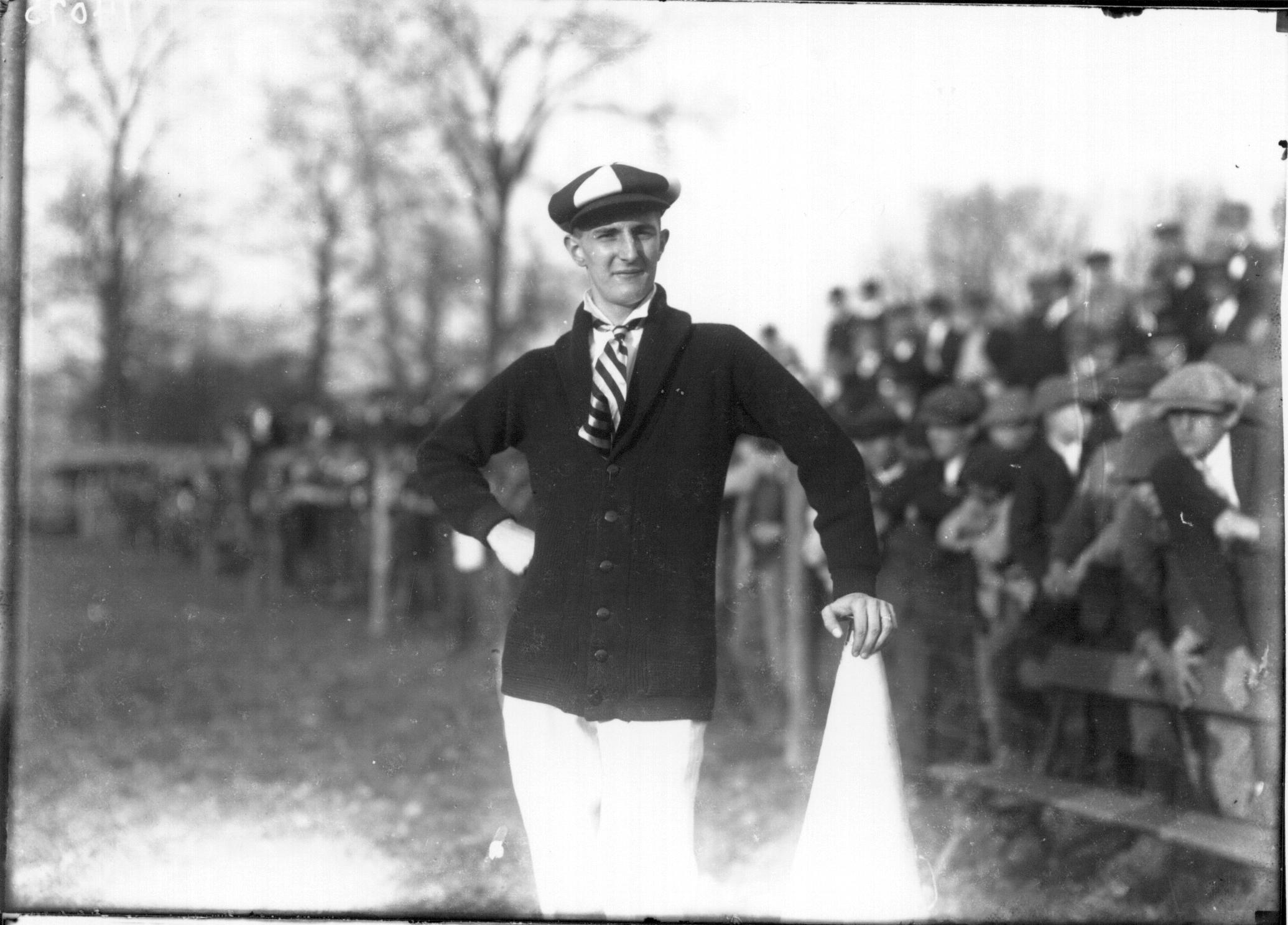
Miami University cheerleader, 1914

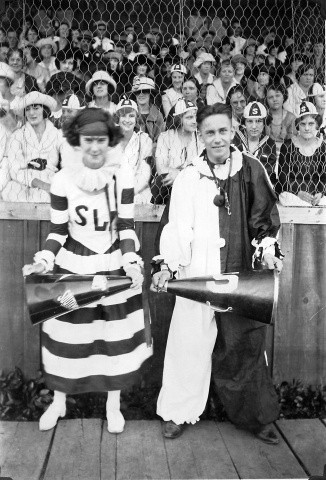
University of Louisiana at Lafayette cheerleaders, 1922

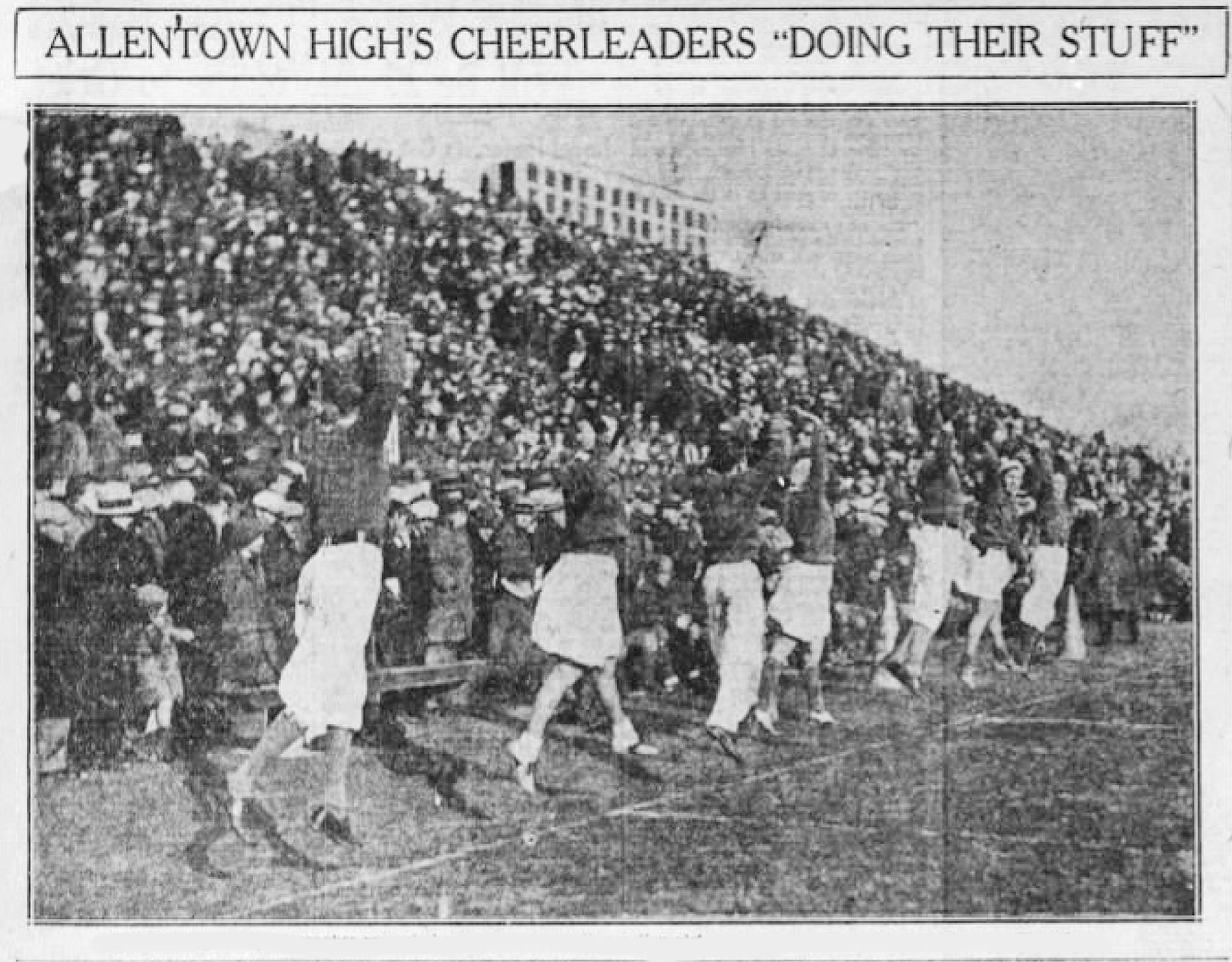
William Allen High School cheerleaders, 1930

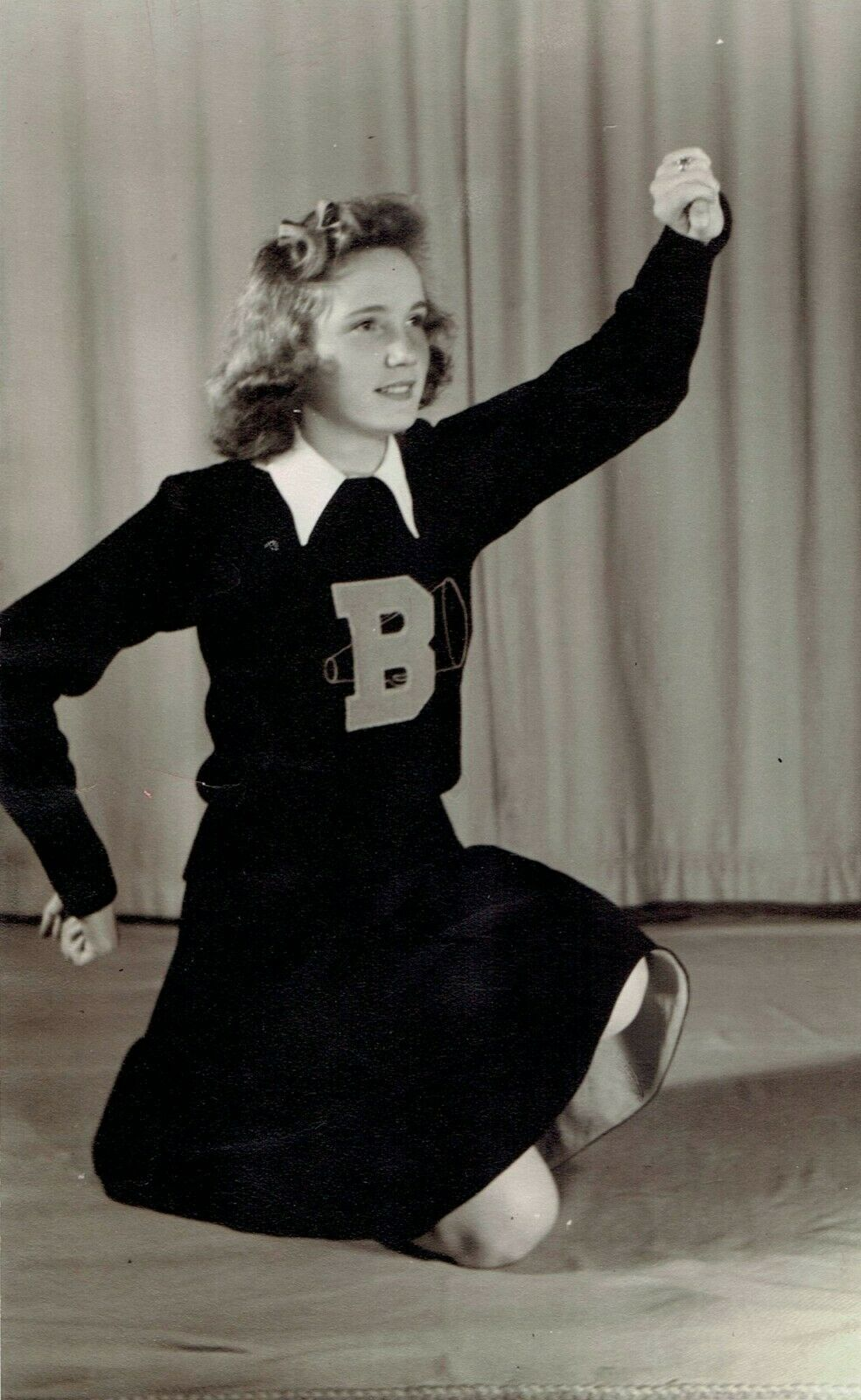
Eva Marie Saint in her cheerleader uniform in Bethlehem Central High School, 1942

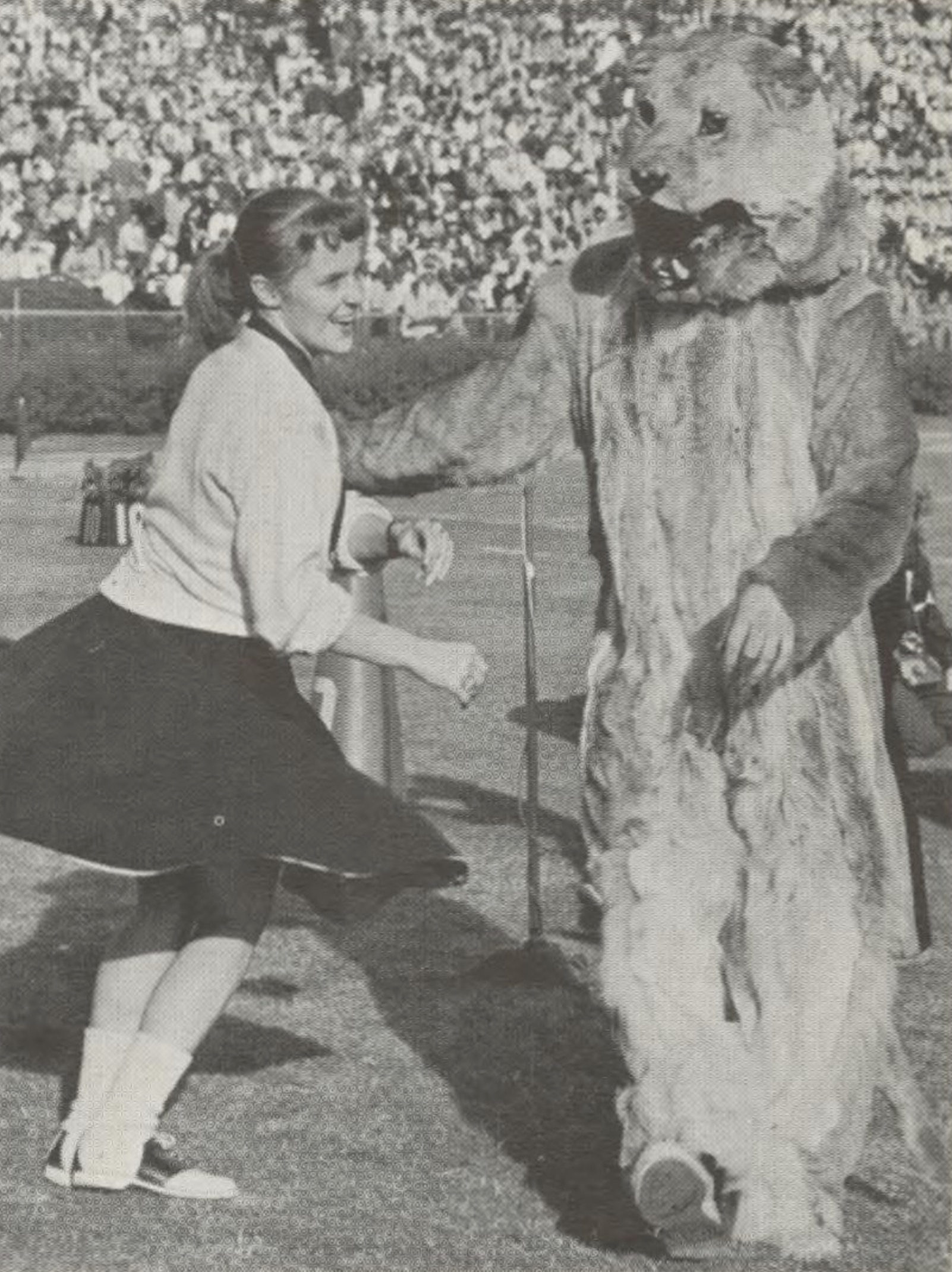
A University of Pittsburgh cheerleader in 1956

== Modern styles of cheerleading uniforms ==
As the focus of cheerleading shifted from an auxiliary unit, to an athletic pursuit, changes in the uniforms' material, style and fit were necessary.

=== 1960s uniforms ===
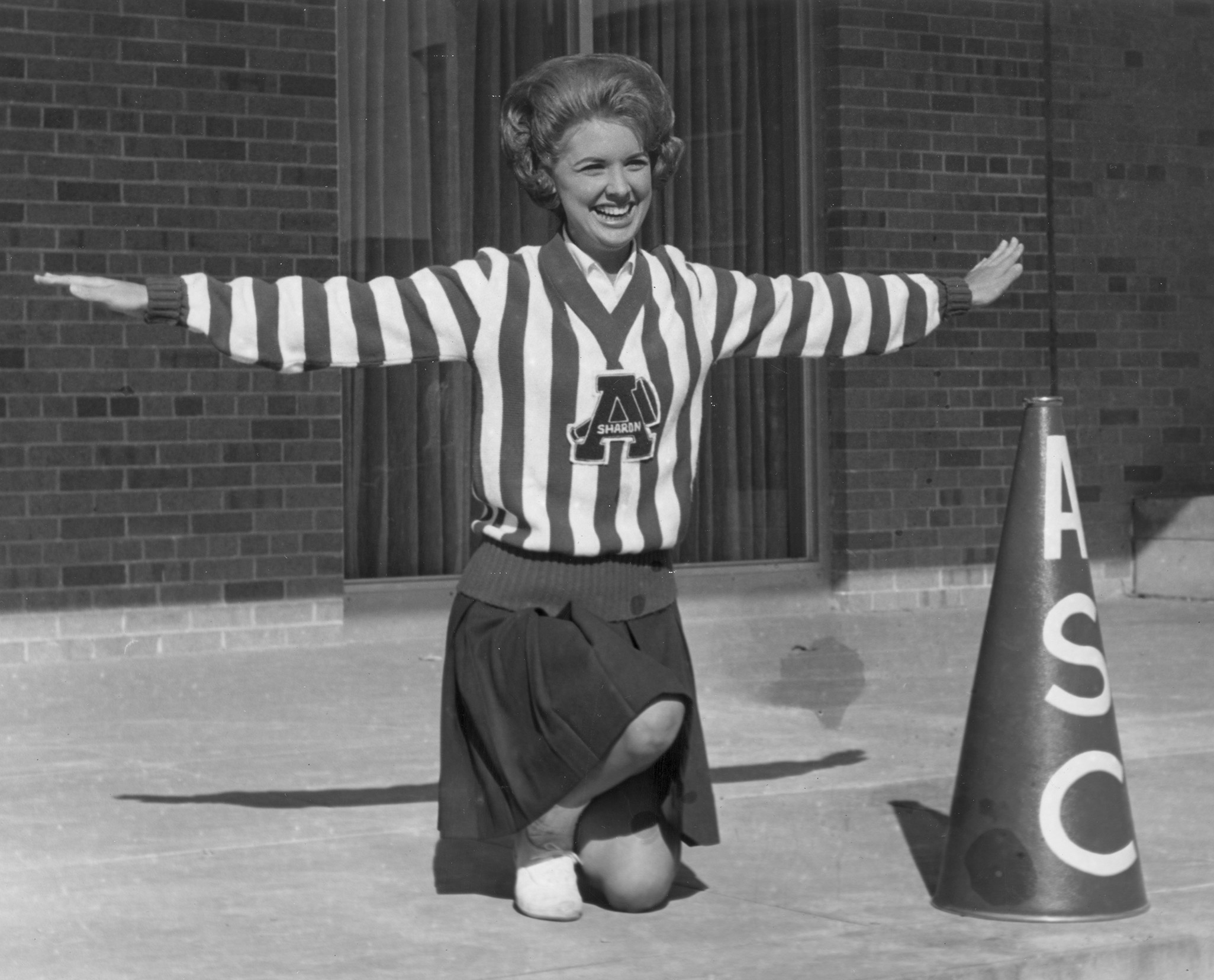
Cheerleader Sharon Terrill, later Miss California, of Arlington State College, 1965

As fashion styles changed through the 1960s so did the cheerleading uniform. Gone were the overly long wool skirts, as pleated shorter skirts became more popular. The long skirt was essentially chopped in half as knee length cotton fabric skirts made for easier movement and a more comfortable experience for the wearer as compared to their wool counterparts.

The sweater top changed dramatically, squads elected to wear short sleeve crew neck sweaters in favor of long cardigans, however the school letters and megaphone emblem remained, now being placed in the center of the stylish crew neck sweaters. Some squads in this time period, in particular high school squads, favored placing an additional embroidered emblem with the squad member's name on the center of the school letter patch. This was a symbol of high school popularity, as it was a huge privilege to be a cheerleader

=== 1970s uniforms ===
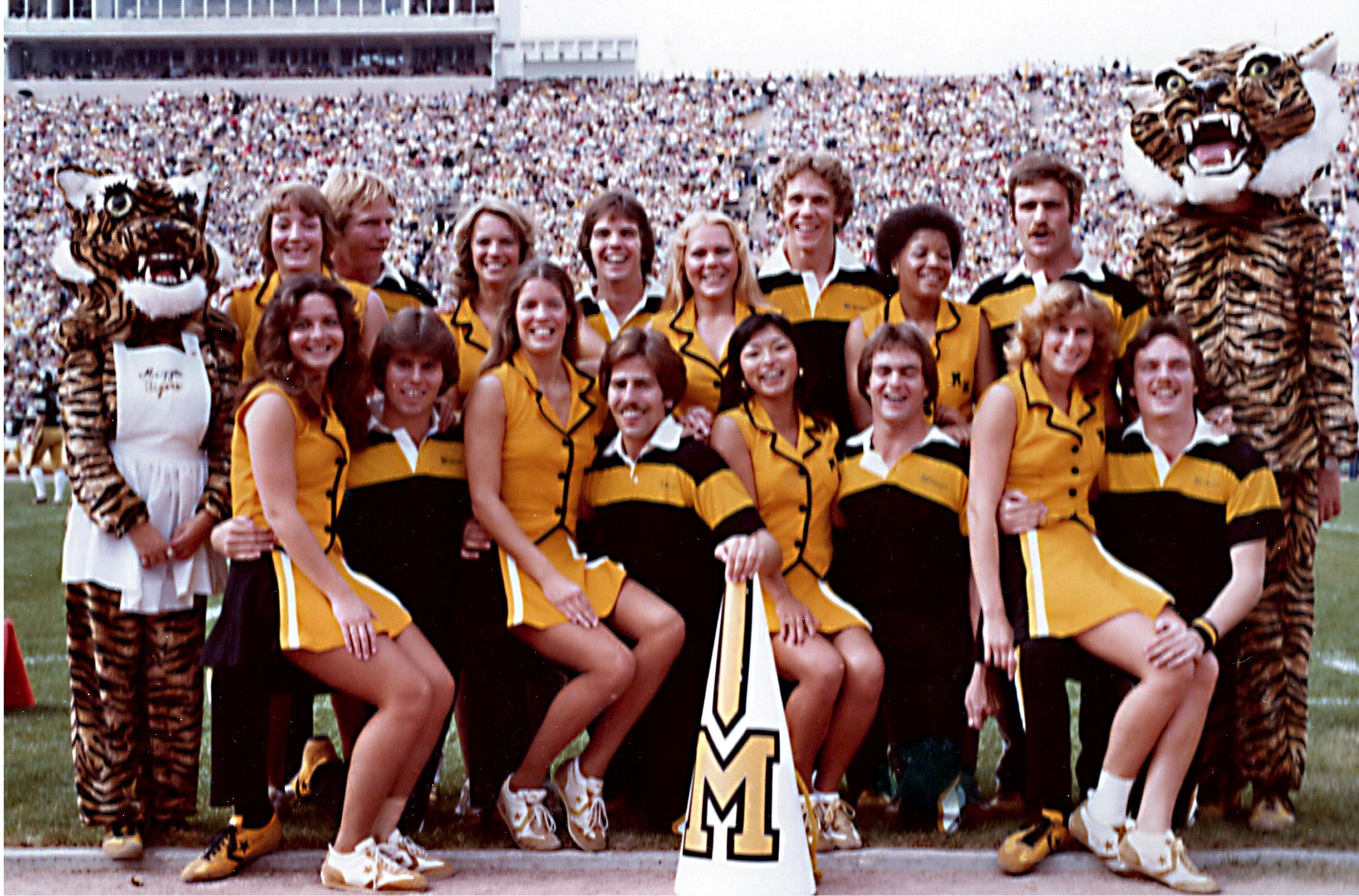
University of Missouri cheerleaders, 1977

Much changed in uniform fashion from the 1960s. Most squads now wore more athletic [material] or tennis shoes. Cheerleaders wore sneakers as opposed to saddle shoes or Keds, and the uniform was made less bulky to allow for easier movement. Also more variety was available for sweaters, vests or shells and skirts. The sweater now featured a stripe pattern on the front, in alternating school colors. The letter patch became more elaborate as well, often more colorful and unique.

Sweaters were also less bulky and had a more flattering fit. This new slimmed style allowed better movement and more of a functional fit, without sacrificing modesty or tradition. Sweaters were made to fit close to the body for a tighter fit, and the length was tapered very short to eliminate excess fabric overlapping the skirt. Often this caused the cheerleader's bare abdomen to be exposed during movement- by now most sweaters were worn without any shirt or collared blouse beneath them. Different styles were incorporated to give squads more of a choice. Round neck, and v-neck sweaters were popular with squads seeking greater functionality, as cheerleading was becoming more athletic instead of the standard vocal chant. The new sweater styles allowed squads to eliminate the extra collared blouse beneath the sweater, essentially just wearing the sweater over a bra. While these uniforms provided a functional style, some modest women in society viewed these outfits as scandalous and racy. The shorter skirts combined with the shorter and tighter sweaters were viewed by some as "improper."

=== 1985–1995 uniforms ===
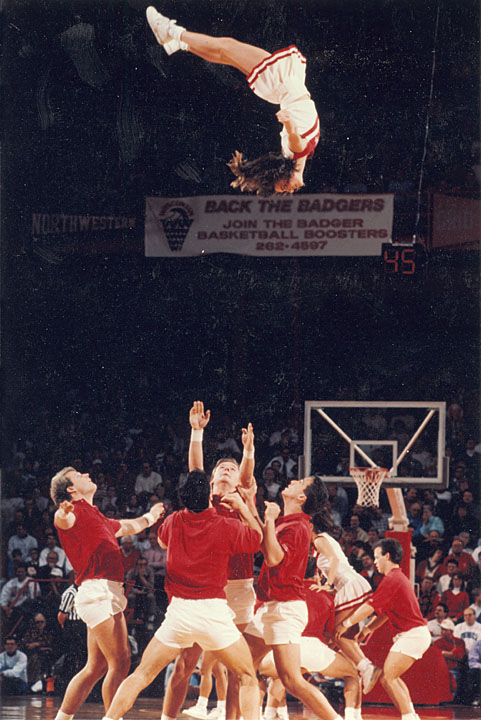
University of Wisconsin–Madison cheerleaders, 1992

Theses uniforms are similar to the current uniforms except slouch socks especially Wigwam slouch socks were very popular to wear. Also Keds champion sneakers were worn by many cheerleaders. A typical school cheerleading uniform from 1985 does not look much different than a uniform today. The favored tops in this period were a turtleneck worn underneath a sweatshirt or a sweater or a waist-length button-down sleeveless modest style vest, worn with or without a turtleneck layer underneath. Sometimes a turtleneck bodysuit was worn instead.

The choice skirt remained a pleat model, but with added color striping around the bottom hem. The length style preferred was shortened to mid-thigh or slightly longer for most squads. The general rule at this time was the skirt had to be down the end of fingers when arm down at side. Bike shorts were worn underneath with some uniforms.

=== Current uniforms ===
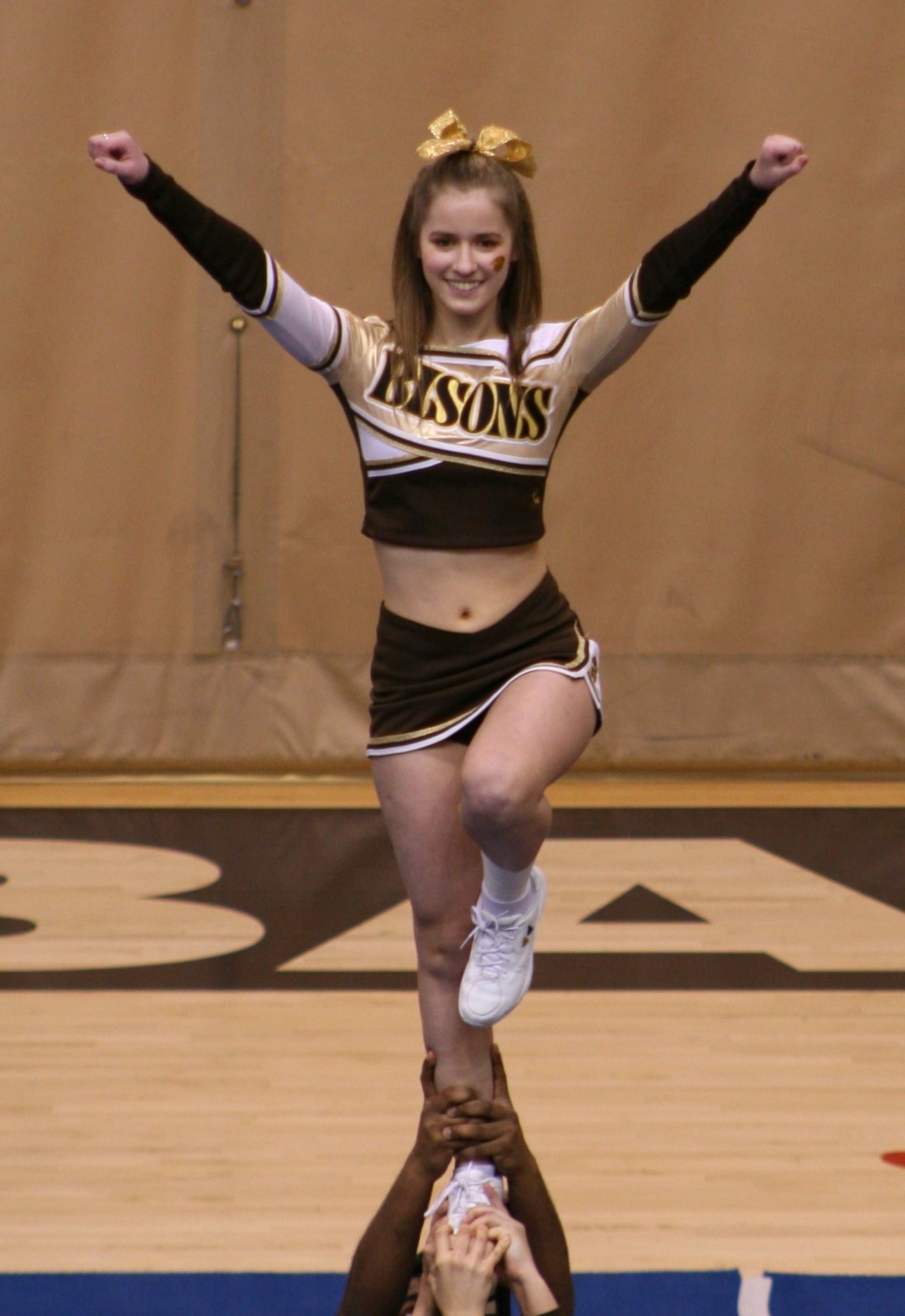
Uniforms made of fabric that stretches easily is helpful for general cheering or competitive cheerleading. (Harding University)

Most uniforms are currently made from a polyester blended fabric, usually containing spandex as well. Shiny foiled covered stretch fabric is commonly found in competitive cheerleading uniforms. Dye-sublimated uniforms have also become increasingly popular in recent years. Dye-sublimated uniforms have a design, team name, or logo printed directly on the garment using a dye-sublimation printer and can give a cheer squad a more individual look with a lower cost.

The top without the sleeves are called shells, if they have sleeves it is called a liner. Most American school squads wear a sleeveless top with either a sports bra or an athletic tank top underneath. If the shell lacks sleeves, many teams wear a turtle neck bodysuit under it, although this is not required specifically. The bodysuits can be either leotard like or covering only to the bottom of the ribcage. Due to guidelines imposed by the National Federation of High Schools, high school squads must have a top that covers their midriff with arms by their sides, however if the arms are raised most uniforms will show a small section of midriff, which is not against NFSHSA rules.

Most school-sanctioned squads have modest-looking uniform tops that are usually a waist-length fit, covering the whole frontal upper body except at the shoulders and arms when worn sleeveless. Likewise, the back construction of most school cheerleading tops cover the full upper body, however skin in the lower back area is mostly left uncovered if the cheerleader is sitting or bending; this does not violate NFSHSA uniform rules. These requirements do not apply to all-star cheerleading organizations, therefore many have tops that stop at or just below the bottom of the bra line.

Another growing trend among all-star teams is having sections of material missing (allowing bare skin to show) across the top for the chest, the shoulders, the top of the back, or portions of the arms. The length of skirts has shortened dramatically, with the average length for skirts at both high school and all-star being 10 to 13 inches, and lengths are shrinking every year, however, some coaches and various team sponsors encourage wearing shorter skirts due to safety reasons (too much fabric can be dangerous while tumbling). Skirts are worn over the top of colored or metallic spandex/polyester briefs, also called lollies, spankies, or bundies. These briefs are worn over the top of underwear and are sometimes printed with stars, dots, etc. The briefs can also sometimes have a team logo, such as a paw print, sewn on the side or across the behind. In colder weather especially when cheerleading outside it is common to see leggings worn under the uniform with socks over the leggings. Mittens or gloves and a head wrap over the ears may also be worn.

Worldwide examples

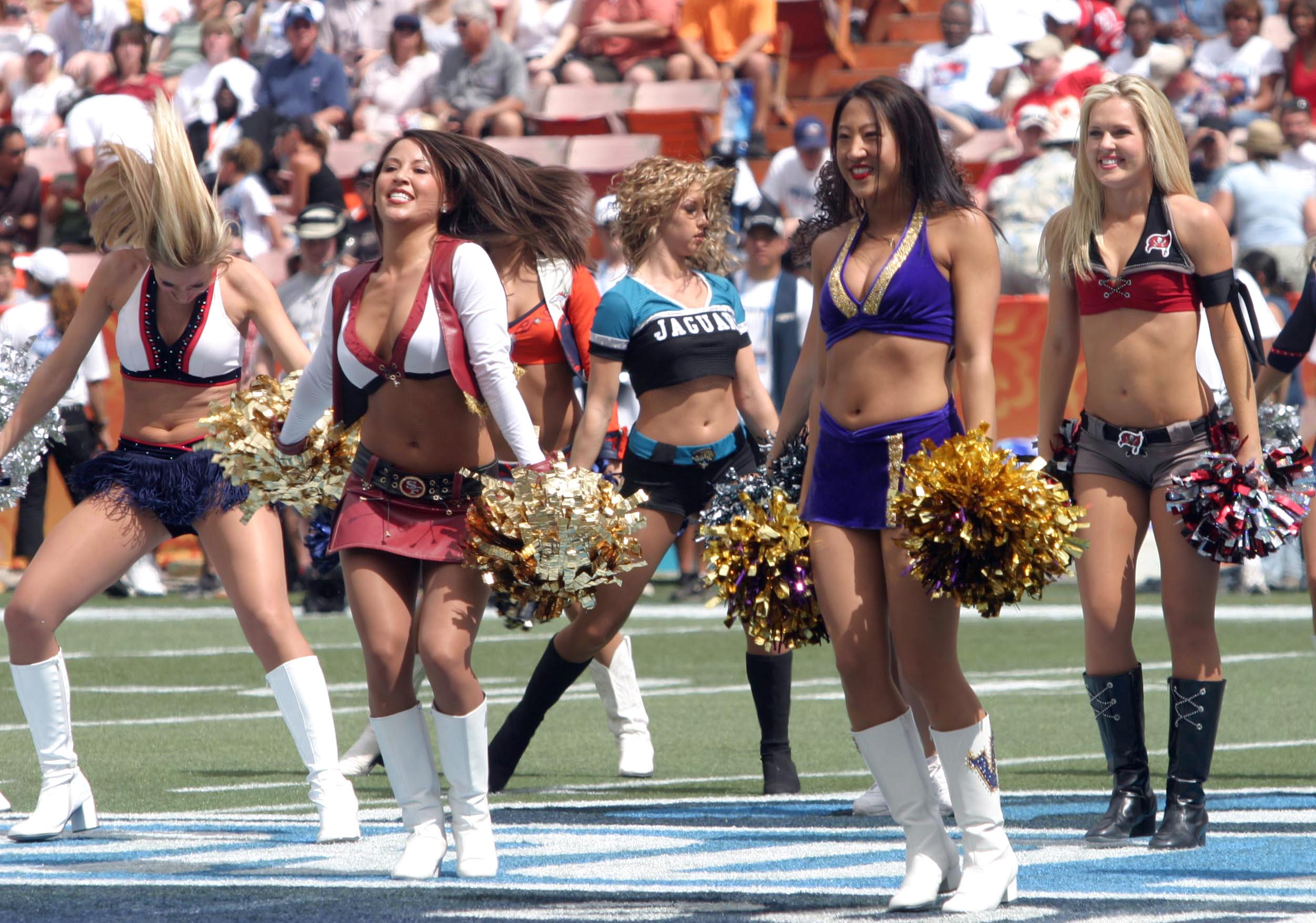
NFL cheerleader uniforms in 2006

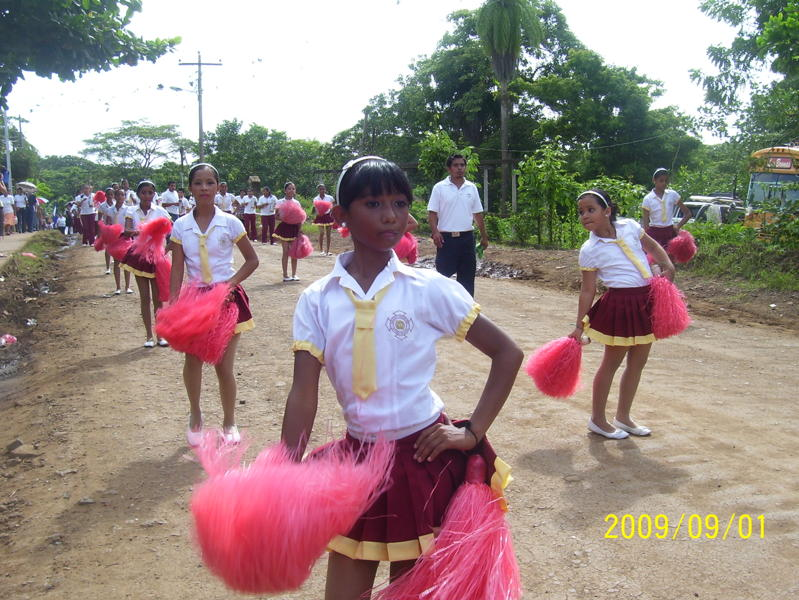
On a parade in Nicaragua in 2009

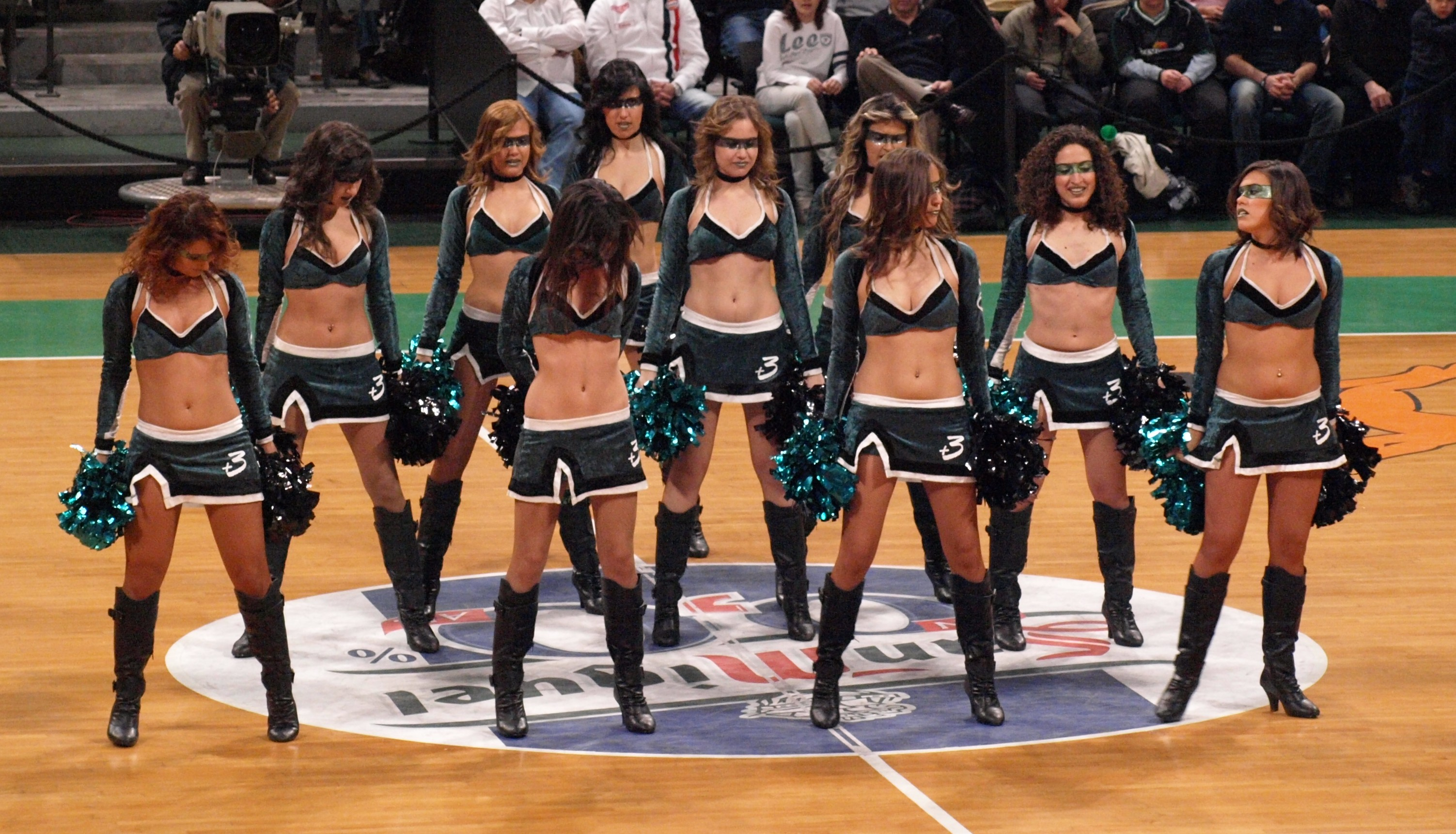
Spanish EuroBasket cheerleaders in 2009

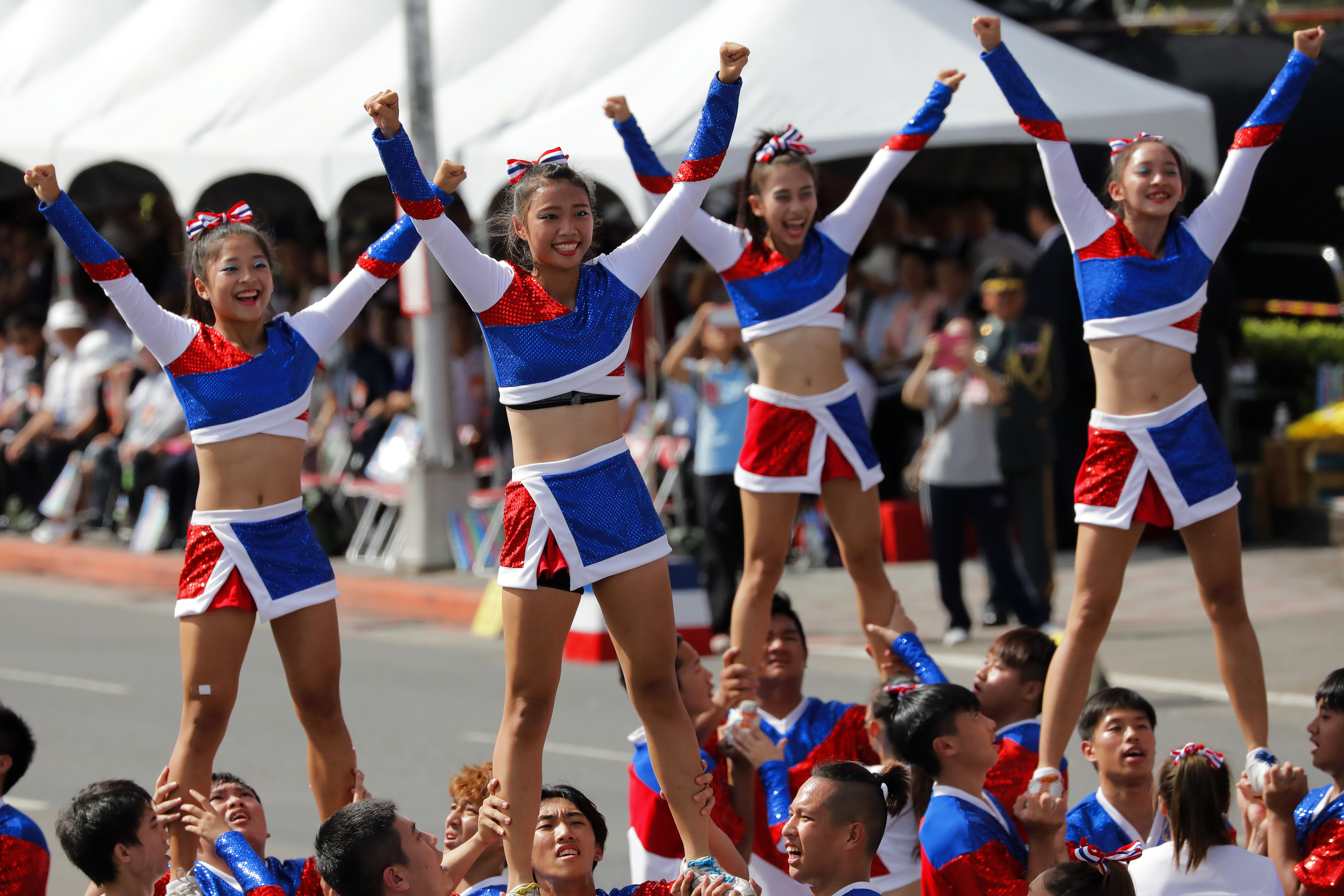
Cheerleaders from Taiwan, 2017

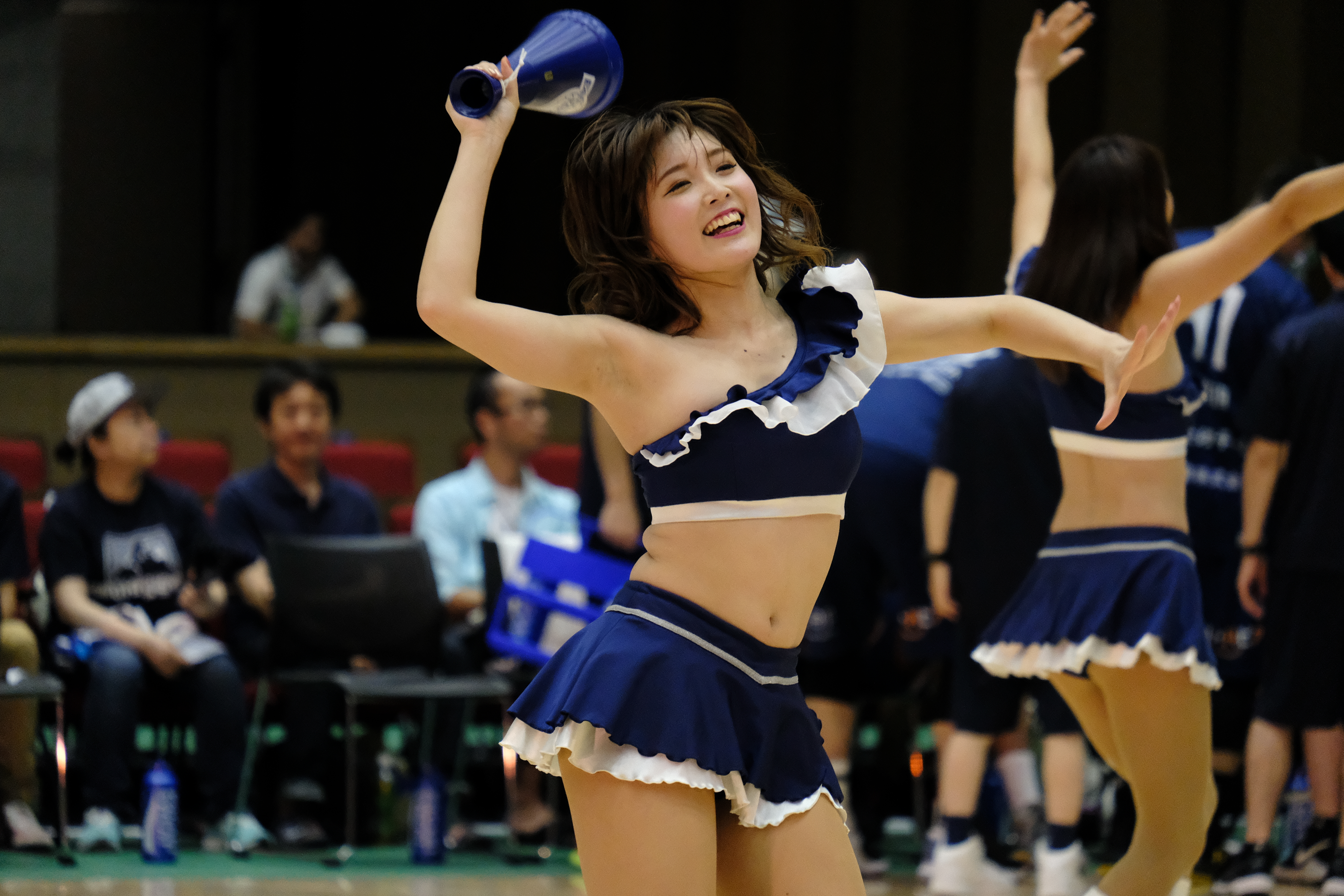
Cheerleading in Japan, 2018

=== Piercing/tattoo rules ===
Due to the frequency of midriff exposure with most cheerleading tops, many schools and all-star coaches prohibit navel rings (belly rings) and other piercings while a cheerleader is at a competition. During competition, most federations also enforce such bans. While there is no official ban on tattoos, school-sanctioned squads typically require that tattoos that could be visible in uniform, be covered with a bandage or waterproof skin shade makeup. Due to the popularity of lower back tattoos, this method is becoming increasingly commonplace.

== Cheerleading uniform terminology ==
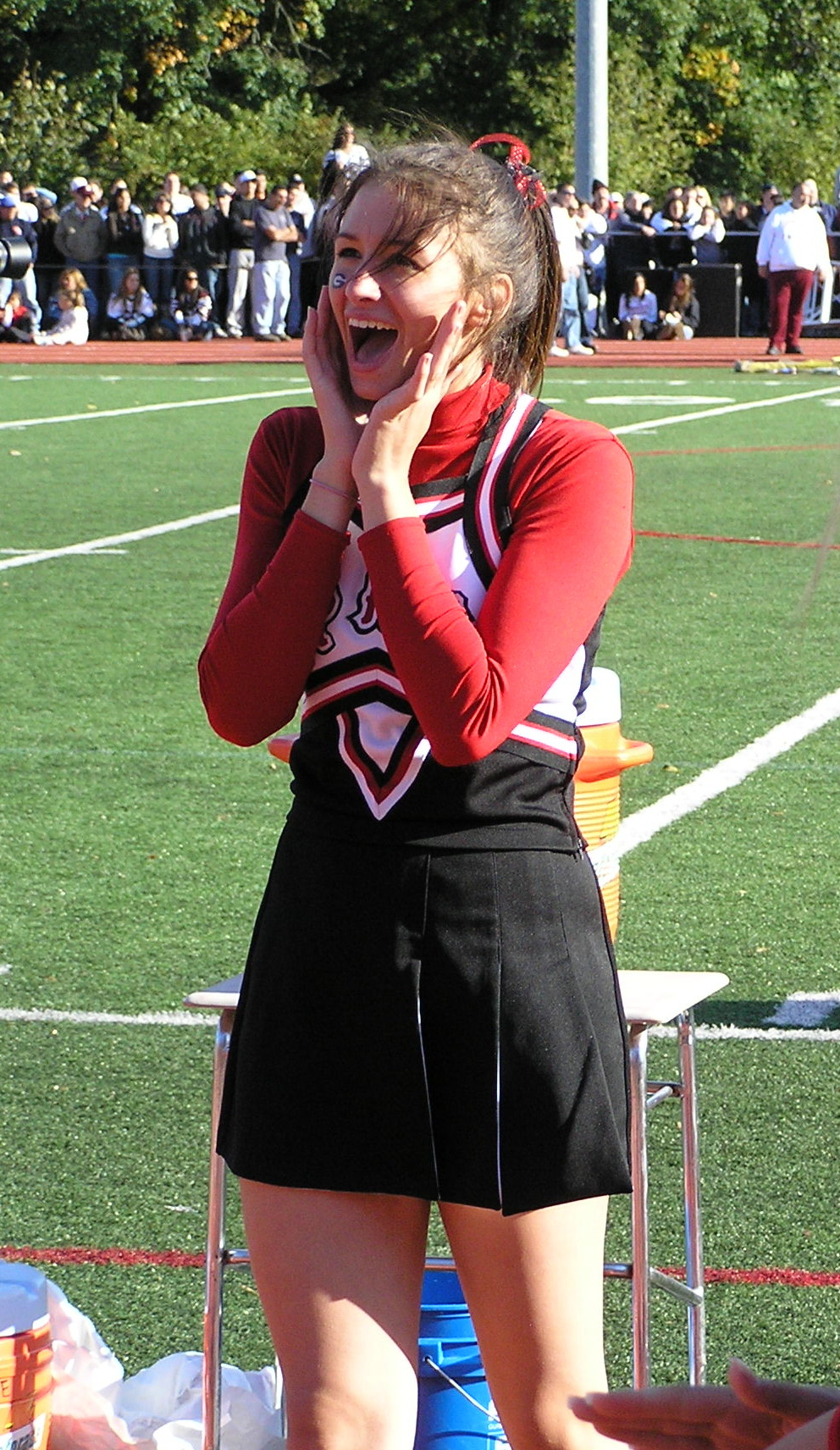
Cheerleader uniform complete with hair ribbon, bodyliner, vest shell, and skirt. (Rye High School, New York)

Ribbons/bows/scrunchies

Worn in the cheerleader's hair, which is often styled to match each other. The ribbons, bows, and scrunchies are usually the school's or the team's colors and can be custom made or ordered through various companies. There are no limits on how unique they make it. Initials, names, or artwork bring out their flare. Their teammates’ bows will look alike since guidelines require cohesiveness.

Bodysuit/bodyliner

A leotard-like undergarment that matches the uniform colors and design, and is intended to be worn underneath the uniform shell. Normally these are long-sleeved tops that snap at the bottom but they can be customized to the length of the shell top, either in a waist-length design or a crop-top style. Most squads prefer to wear bodysuits during competition as it creates a uniformed look in arm movements. Waist length shells can be worn with several styles of bodyliners, in contrast to midriff shells which are limited to cropped stomach-showing liners. Full coverage bodyliners worn under a waist length shell eliminate all midriff exposure during cheering. A cropped liner worn under a waist-length shell will cover the arms but leaves the stomach uncovered, allowing midriff skin to still show just as if the shell were to be worn alone.

Warm-ups: jacket and pant sets frequently worn over the main cheerleading uniform before competitions or during cold weather.

Shell/vest

Made out of polyester and cotton, this is the main focal point of the uniform. This is the top of the outfit which includes the design of the uniform stripes, school/team colors, and the mascot or high school insignias or school letters. Example: "Willow High School" would be "WHS". The shell is normally sleeveless with a "V" neckline, however the neckline style can often be customized by the school or team during the uniform ordering process. The shell can either have a zipper closure in the back or side to aid in dressing, or it can have a stretchy material that allows the top to expand slightly when dressing. The shell is designed to fit somewhat snug but not tight on the wearer—it should fit close to the body. The shell can be worn alone over a bra or camisole, or it can be worn over-top a bodysuit of choice or a simple turtleneck. This is usually up to each squad's preference. A shell top is available in many lengths and even in somewhat intricate style cues.

Full shell

Usually sleeveless, and having a simple style design. It is normally waist length, ending at the top of the skirt. Typically worn alone with a bra underneath. This style top is worn by most American school squads as it is very modest and meets most dress codes, with midriff exposure limited to bare lower backs and an inch of frontal skin while the arms are raised. The sleeveless shell, if worn alone, will normally leave the arms and shoulders open. A properly fitted shell top is essential in making the uniform look flattering for everyone on the cheer squad. A shell that is properly sized and fitted will leave enough room around the arm openings for movement, eliminating fabric rubbing against the underarms. Additionally, if the shell is sized with the correct measurements, the bottom of the hem should be long enough to meet the top of the skirt while standing stationary. These tops can be highly customized from very ordinary to highly detailed designs. Certain cut-outs in sections of the garment are an option, as are varying hemlines for the bottom of the top. For instance, instead of a straight hem along the bottom of the top, some squads will choose a "cut-up V" hem, which leaves an upside down "V" notch open along the front, leaving slight midriff exposed at the belly button area. This style is selected to allow for an additional color stripe along the bottom hem of the shell.

Halter shell

Similar in style and length as a full fitting shell top, but differing in the upper part of the garment. This top is normally fully sleeveless, and more revealing of the upper back. The halter style normally includes a neck strap on the top that ties in the back.

Crop top/midriff

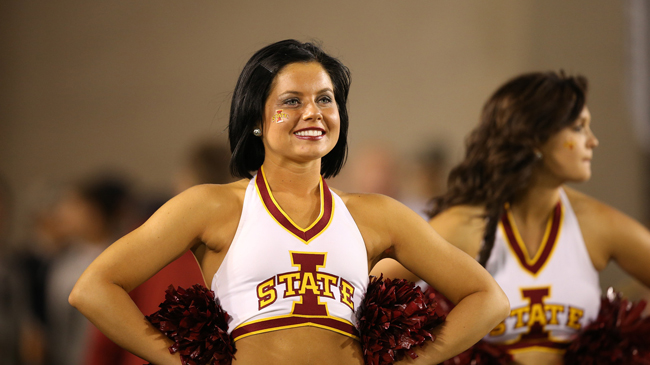
Cheerleading uniform with a crop top. (Iowa State University)

This style of top is mostly used by colleges and out-of-school squads (all-star squads). It is very revealing, and rarely worn by high school squads due to dress code violations. The top is typically worn sleeveless with only a bra underneath. The school's or team's logo is featured in the center of the top. The top ends right after the bra-line leaving the entire midriff of the cheerleader showing. The National Federation of State High School Associations (NFHS) instituted a rule against cropped uniform tops at the high school level. Most cheerleading governing bodies outlaw this top from being worn by public schools in competition, however a few middle and high schools still choose to wear this style of top at their respective non-competing events, such as football games or parades. There has been much debate on whether it is right to have a teenage girl wearing a garment like this at a public school, as much of the body is revealed by this top.

Skirt

The bottom of a cheerleading uniform, with matching colors and logo/stripe design as the shell. Skirts can be very customizable with various styles of pleat designs, or no pleats at all, such as an "A-line" skirt. The general rule of length for skirts is mid-thigh and can be sized simply by using the "fingertip" rule. Modern skirts are offered in various rises as well. Traditionally the skirt should be worn at the natural waistline, at the navel area. The traditional skirt should be high enough to touch the bottom of the shell slightly. However some squads elect to wear low-rise skirts either with longer shells or with a normal length shell creating a midriff look. Cheer briefs or spankies must be worn under the skirt.
