= Kimora Blac =

American drag queen (born 1988)

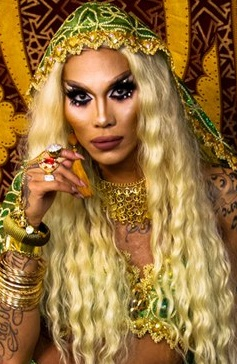
- Blac in 2018
- Born: Von Nguyen; December 15, 1988 (age 37); Wichita, Kansas, U.S.
- Occupations: Drag queen; TV personality
- Years active: 2003–present
- Known for: RuPaul's Drag Race
- Spouse: Rico "Anthony" Sandoval
- Website: kimorasupply.com

Kimora Blac is the stage name of Von Nguyen, an American drag queen and television personality, best known for competing on the ninth season of RuPaul's Drag Race.

== Early life ==
Von Nguyen was born on December 15, 1988, in Wichita, Kansas. She is of Vietnamese heritage. Von Nguyen grew up in Elk Grove, California before moving to San Francisco, California to start drag, going by the name Lelani. She auditioned for season 4 of Drag Race and changed her name to Kimora Blac because she didn't know how to correctly spell Leilani.

She then moved to Las Vegas, Nevada, where she resided when she was cast to appear on RuPaul's Drag Race. Her drag name comes from Kimora Lee Simmons and her favorite color black, with the "k" removed because "it added a twist".

== Career ==
=== RuPaul's Drag Race ===
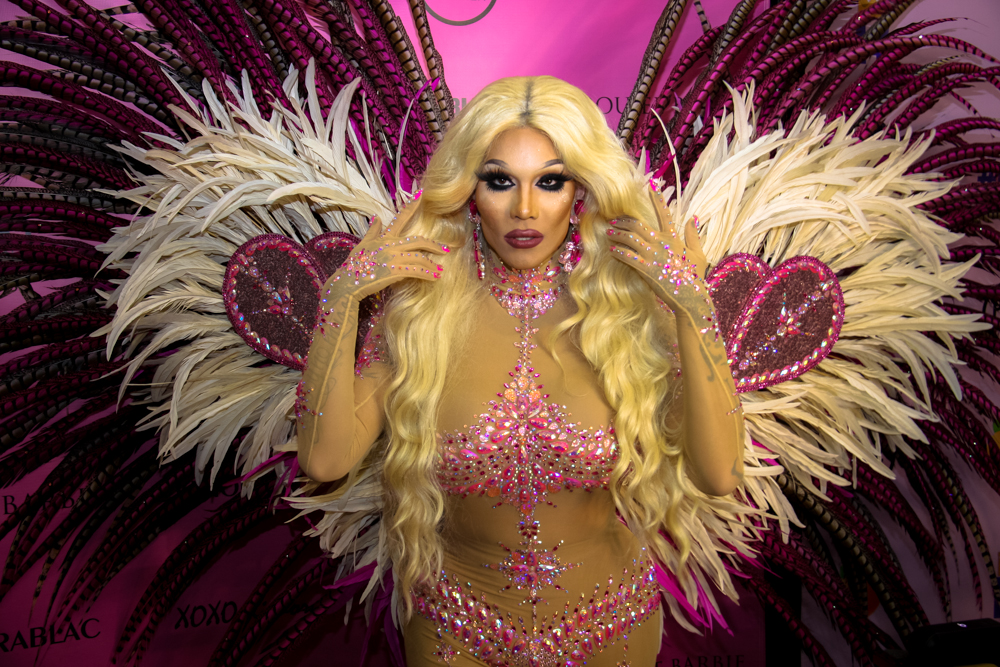
Kimora Blac in 2017

Kimora Blac first did amateur drag when she was fifteen with Dragula contestant Melissa Befierce. She started doing professional drag when she was eighteen. She auditioned for Drag Race three times.

Kimora Blac was announced as one of fourteen contestants for the ninth season of RuPaul's Drag Race on February 2, 2017. After being declared safe in episode one, she was placed in the bottom two in the second episode with Jaymes Mansfield and won a lip sync against her to "Love Shack" by The B-52's. She was eliminated in the third episode after lip syncing to "Holding Out for a Hero" by Bonnie Tyler, against Aja.

Kimora Blac appeared as a guest for the first challenge in the premiere of season eleven of Drag Race.

=== Other work ===
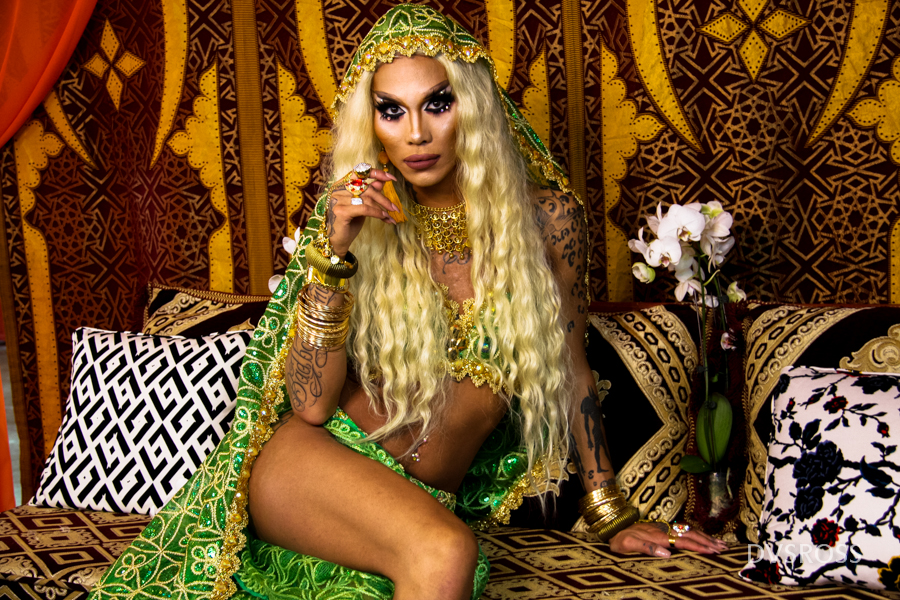
Kimora Blac in 2018

In September 2017, Kimora Blac recreated the September 2014 cover of Paper magazine with Kim Kardashian, which was given positive reception by Kardashian on Twitter.

Kimora Blac became the host for the WOWPresents internet series, "Wait, What?" where she's asked trivia questions with alternating categories. Her co-hosts for the show included Mariah, Derrick Barry, Gia Gunn, Laganja Estranja, Ongina, Jaidynn Diore-Fierce and Jasmine Masters. The first episode was available on YouTube on October 8, 2018.

Kimora Blac appeared as a guest for two episodes of The Trixie & Katya Show in March 2018. She appeared in an episode of the television series Botched with Trinity the Tuck in December 2018. Kimora Blac joined Eve in her lip sync performance of Supermodel by RuPaul during her appearance on The Talk.

Kimora Blac was a featured performer during Jennifer Lopez's performance at the 2022 iHeartRadio Music Awards. She has a beauty and makeup channel on YouTube.

== Personal life ==
Nguyen cites Erika Jayne and Paris Hilton along with Simmons and Kardashian as inspirations to her drag aesthetic.

Kimora Blac's drag daughter is Amaya Blac.

== Filmography ==
=== Film ===
Year	Title	Role	Notes
2021	The Bitch Who Stole Christmas	Townsfolk #1	

=== Television ===
Year	Title	Role	Notes
2017, 2019	RuPaul's Drag Race	Herself	Contestant: Season 9 - 13th Place, Guest: Season 11 (Episode "Whatcha Unpackin?")
2017	RuPaul's Drag Race: Untucked	Herself	Companion show to RuPaul's Drag Race
2018	The Trixie & Katya Show	Herself	Season 1 (Episodes "Money" and "Family")
2018	Botched	Herself	Season 5 (Episode "Muscles, Tucks and Forehead Flaps")
2019	The Talk	Herself	Guest

=== Web series ===
Year	Title	Role	Notes	Ref
2018, 2019	The Pit Stop	Herself	Guest (Episodes "Season 10 Episode 10" and "Season 11 Episode 4")	
2018–present	Wait, What?	Herself	Co-Host	
2018	Out of the Closet	Herself	Guest, Episode 5	
2019	Iconic	Herself	Guest, Episode 4	
2019	ASMR Queens	Herself	Guest, Episode 2	
2019	Try Guys	Herself	Episode: "The Try Guys Lip Sync Battle Drag Queens"	
2019	Cosmo Queens	Herself	Episode: "Kimora Blac"	

=== Music videos ===
Year	Title	Artist
2017	"Too Funky"	Peppermint featuring Ari Gold
2017	"Expensive (Deluxe Version)"	Todrick Hall
2020	"Ass Like Mine"	Morgan McMichaels
