= Jaymes Mansfield =

Drag queen & TV personality (born 1990)

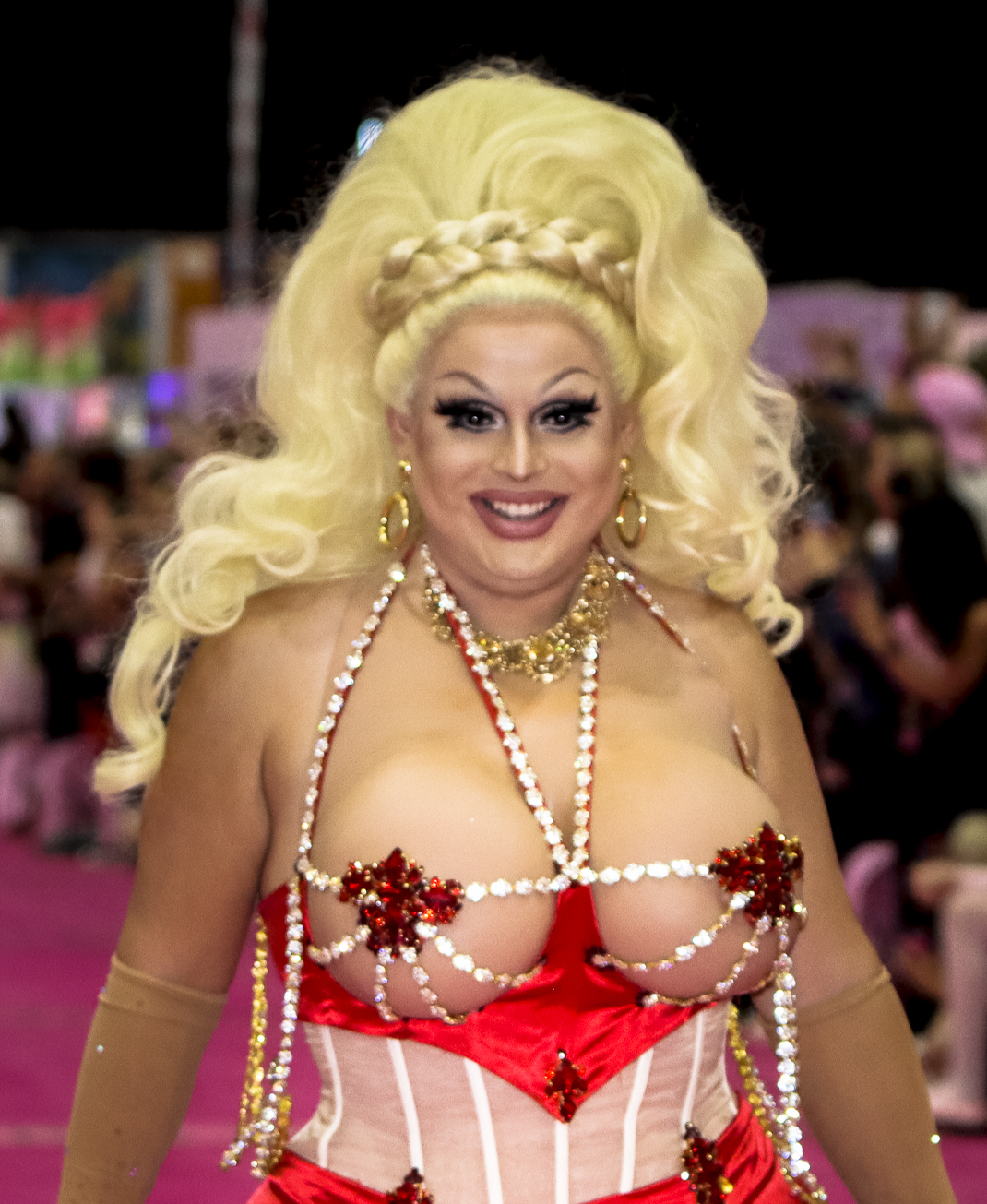
- Jaymes Mansfield at RuPaul's DragCon LA, 2022
- Born: James Jeffrey Wirth; February 19, 1990 (age 36); Milwaukee, Wisconsin, U.S.
- Occupation: Drag queen
- Years active: 2013–present
- Known for: RuPaul's Drag Race

YouTube information
- Channel: Jaymes Mansfield
- Genre: Beauty
- Subscribers: 199 thousand
- Views: 30.5 million
- Last updated: 4 August 2026
- Website: jaymesmansfieldbeauty.com

James Jeffrey Wirth (born February 19, 1990), better known as Jaymes Mansfield, is an American drag queen, TV personality, and YouTuber. She is best known for competing on the ninth season of RuPaul's Drag Race, the eighth season of RuPaul's Drag Race All Stars, and playing the part of Delia Von Whitewoman in the film The Bitch Who Stole Christmas.

== Early life ==
Wirth was born in Milwaukee, Wisconsin. She was raised Catholic and attended Catholic school. She came out as gay to her parents in junior high. Her father worked as a clown and suffered a heart attack when she was young. Wirth performed as a puppeteer, visual artist and later drag queen in Milwaukee, in 2016 she was cast to appear on RuPaul's Drag Race.

== Career ==
Jaymes Mansfield was announced as one of the 14 contestants for the ninth season of RuPaul's Drag Race on February 2, 2017. After being safe in episode one, she was placed in the bottom two in the second episode with Kimora Blac and lost the lip sync for the song "Love Shack" by The B-52's, becoming the first queen eliminated. She appeared as a guest for the first challenge in the premiere of season ten of Drag Race. She made another appearance at the season 11 live finale with other alumni. In 2022, Mansfield returned to the show as a guest on the 5th episode of the 14th season, along with Tempest DuJour and Kahmora Hall.

Mansfield created a YouTube channel in 2013, where she frequently uploads videos. In her ongoing series Drag Herstory, she explains the history of drag queens and drag culture. The first episode was available on May 29, 2016.

On September 2, 2019, Mansfield launched her own wig company.

In 2020 and 2021, Mansfield has also appeared on the YouTube wrestling quiz show "Quizzlemania" and won said quiz show one time. She competed on the eighth season of RuPaul's Drag Race All Stars (2023).

== Discography ==
As featured artist

Title	Year	Album
"God Rest the Nagging Children" (Frosted Tip and the Holiday Land Drag Queens)	2018	The Holiday Dragtacular
"Up on the House Top" (Frosted Tip and the Holiday Land Drag Queens)	2018	The Holiday Dragtacular
"Money, Success, Fame, Glamour" (Disco version) (with the cast of RuPaul's Drag Race All Stars, season 8)	2023	Non-album single
"Estoy Perdida"	2023	Non-album single
"J Cool Has an Emmy"	2023	Non-album single
"Joan! The Unauthorized Rusical" (with the cast of RuPaul's Drag Race All Stars, season 8)	2023	Joan! The Unauthorized Rusical Album

== Filmography ==
=== Film ===
Year	Title	Role	Notes	Ref.
2014	Diamonds to Dust	Miscellaneous Crew / Gregg Tyler	Documentary	
2019	Trixie Mattel: Moving Parts	Herself	Documentary	
2021	The Bitch Who Stole Christmas	Delia Von Whitewoman	VH1 Film	
2025	Outed	Mother	Short film	

=== Television ===
Year	Title	Role	Notes	Refs
2017–25	RuPaul's Drag Race	Herself	Contestant: Season 9 - 14th Place; Guest: Season 10 (Episode "10s Across the Board"); Guest: Season 14 (Episode "Save a Queen"); Guest: Season 17 (Episode "Squirrel Games")	
2017	RuPaul's Drag Race: Untucked	Herself	Companion show to RuPaul's Drag Race	
2017	Watch What Happens Live with Andy Cohen	Herself	Guest	
2020	AJ and the Queen	Drag Queen	Guest appearance	
2022	Trixie Motel	Herself	Guest	
2023	RuPaul's Drag Race All Stars	Herself	Contestant (7th Place)	
2023	RuPaul's Drag Race All Stars: Untucked	Herself	Contestant (7th Place)	

=== Web series ===
Year	Title	Role	Notes	Ref.
2016–2019	Drag Herstory	Herself	Host	
2017	Transformations with James St. James	Herself	Guest	
2017	Drag Queen Carpool	Herself	One episode, hosted by RuPaul	
2017	Whatcha Packin'	Herself	Eliminated Queen, Season 9, Episode 1	
2017	Cooking with Drag Queens	Herself		
2017	Queen to Queen	Herself	Guest, with Valentina	
2017	Wrestling with Wregret	Herself	Guest	
2018	Cosmo Queens	Herself	Featured Queen	
2018	Camp Wannakiki	Herself	Cameo, Season 1, Episode 2	
2018	Hey Qween!	Herself	Season 6	
2018	Bootleg Opinions	Herself	All Stars 4 Press Party (with Yuhua Hamasaki)	
2018	List It!	Herself	Ring The Belle series	
2018	Sis Jenner	Herself	Two episodes	
2018	How To Makeup	Herself	World of Wonder Productions	
2019	The Lost Snatch Game Audition Tapes	Herself	World of Wonder Productions, Episode 101	
2020–21	Quizzlemania	Herself	Guest	
2023	Give It To Me Straight	Herself	Guest	
2023	Meet the Queens	Herself	Stand-alone special RuPaul's Drag Race All Stars 8	
2023	EW News Flash	Herself	Guest	
2023	BuzzFeed Celeb	Herself	Guest	
2023	React to TikTok Trends by Allure	Herself	Guest	
2024	House of Laughs	Herself	WOWPresents Plus original	
2024	Drag Me to The Movies	Various	Produced by World of Wonder	

=== Music videos ===
Year	Title	Artist	Ref
2017	"Too Funky"	Peppermint featuring Ari Gold	
2018	"So Juicy"	Soju	
2019	"Rocking Around the Hanukkah Bush"	Alexis Michelle	
