= Drag queen =

Entertainer dressed and acting with exaggerated femininity

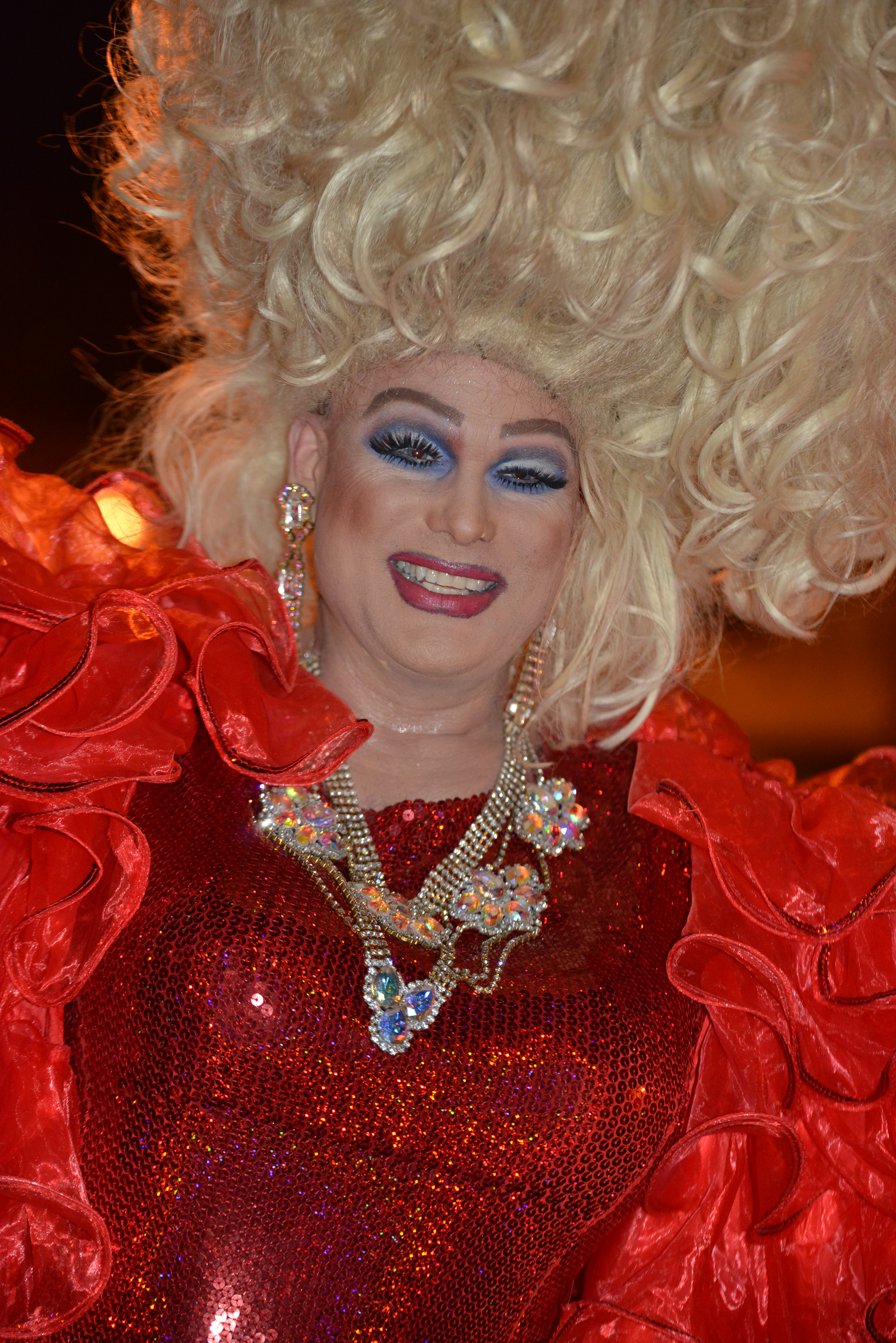
A drag queen performer

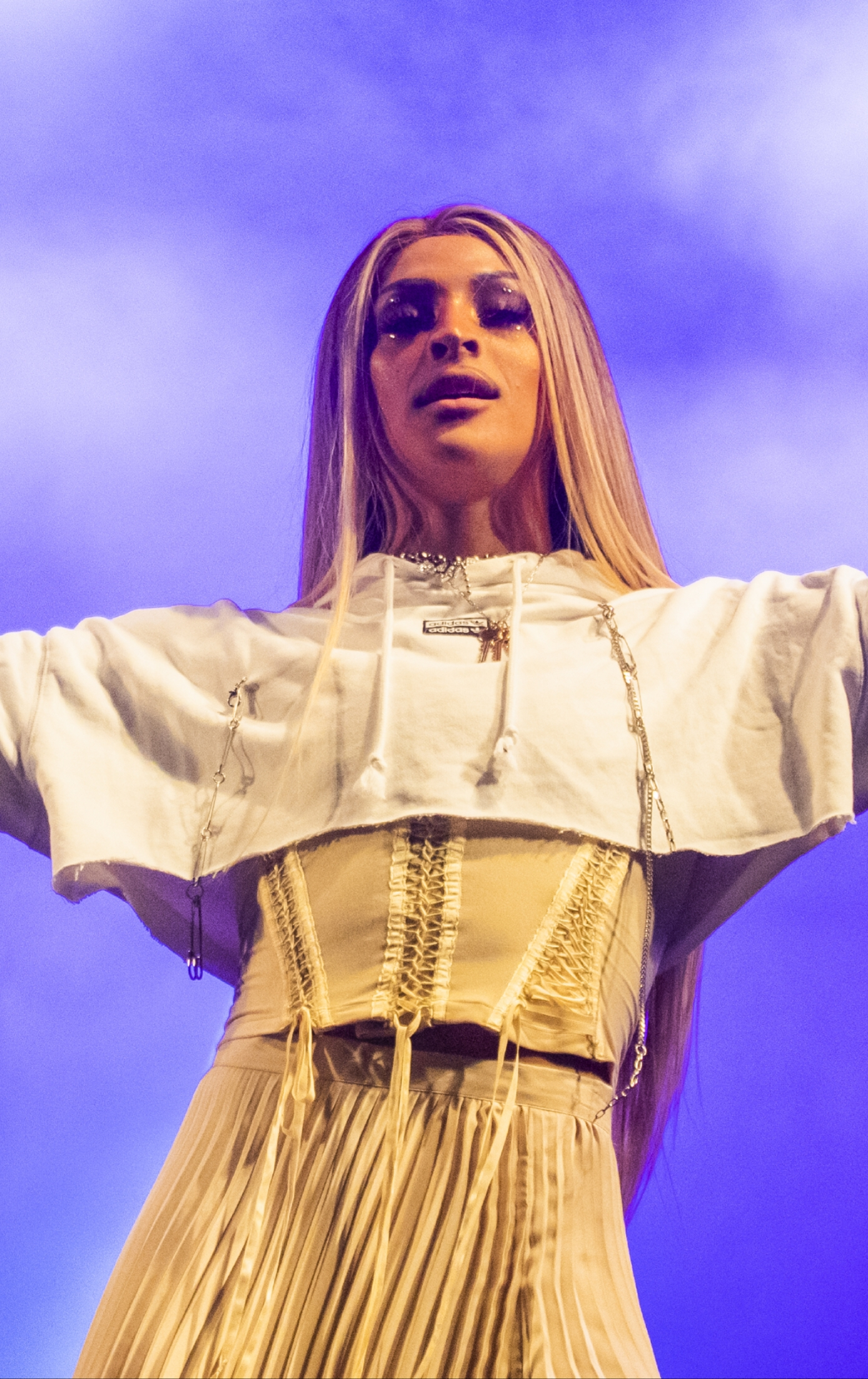
Pabllo Vittar, Brazilian drag queen, singer, and performer

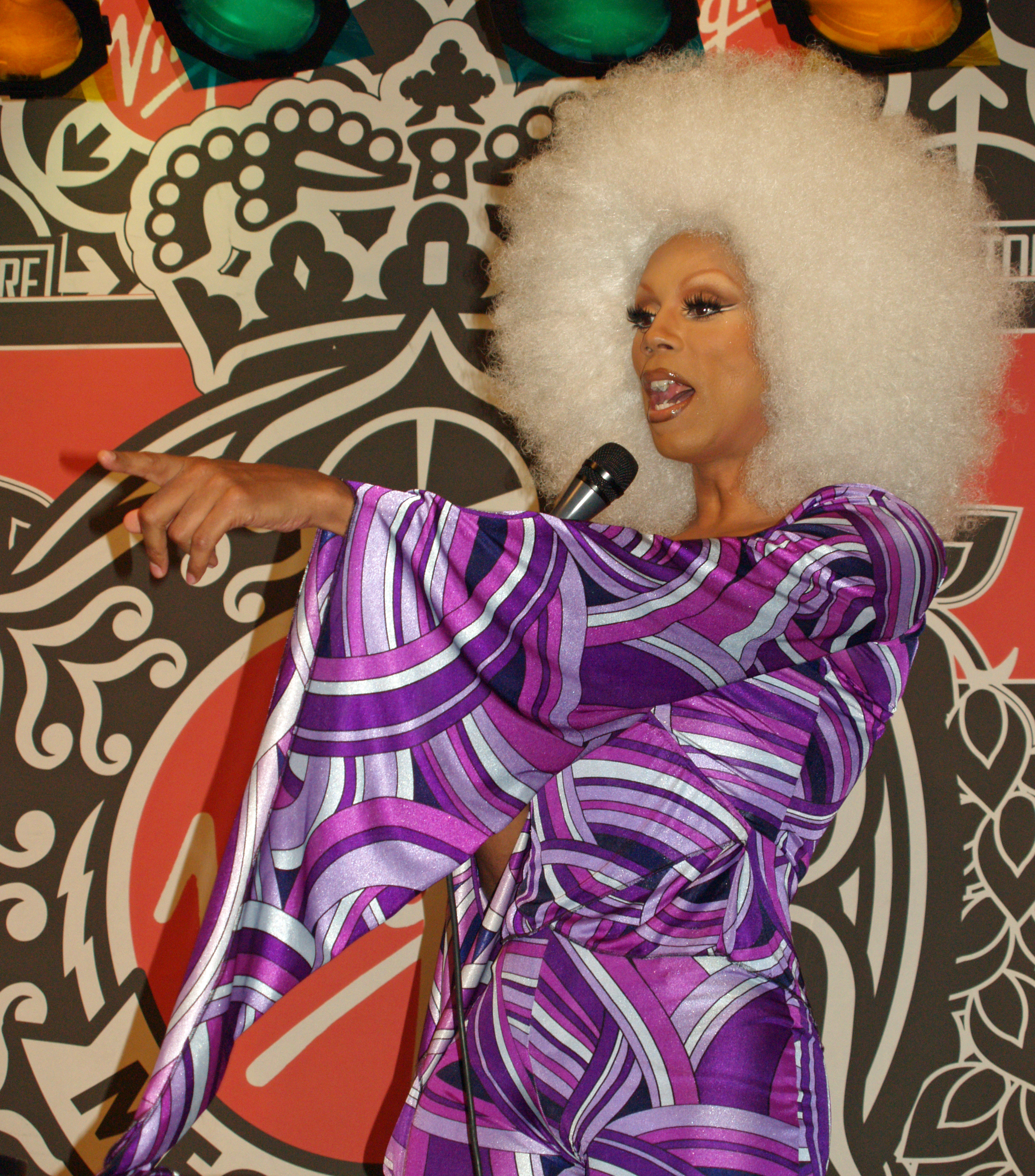
RuPaul, American drag queen, actor, and musician

A drag queen is a person, usually male, who uses drag clothing and makeup to imitate and often exaggerate female gender signifiers and gender roles for entertainment purposes. Historically, drag queens have usually been gay men and have been a part of gay culture.

People do drag for reasons ranging from self-expression to mainstream performance. Drag shows frequently include lip-syncing, live singing, and dancing. They typically occur at LGBTQ pride parades, drag pageants, cabarets, carnivals, and nightclubs. Drag queens vary by type, culture, and dedication, from professionals who star in films and spend a lot of their time in their drag personas, to people who do drag only occasionally. In most cases, women who dress as men and entertain by imitating them are called drag kings.

Those who do occasional drag may be from backgrounds other than the LGBTQ community. There is a long history of folkloric and theatrical crossdressing that involves people of all orientations. Not everyone who does drag at some point in their lives is a drag queen or a drag king.

== Terminology, scope, and etymology ==
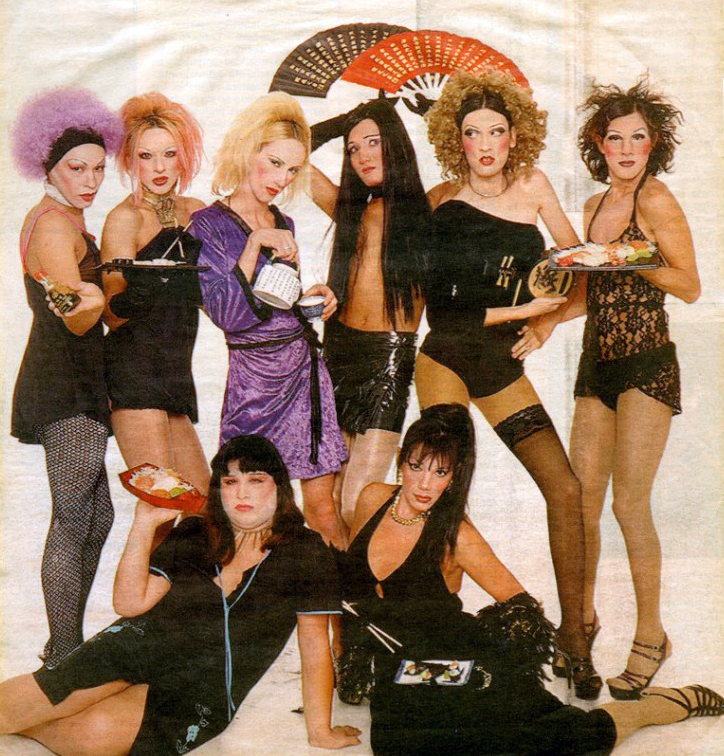
Drag queens from Buenos Aires advertising a nightclub, 1995

=== Drag ===
The term drag may date as far back as the Elizabethan era in England, whereas the first recorded use of drag in this context is from 1870. There are several other possible origins.

Traditionally, drag involves cross-dressing and transforming one's sex through the use of makeup and other costume devices. However, under newer conceptions of drag, conceivably performing an exaggerated and heightened form of one's own gender could be considered a drag performance.

=== Female impersonator ===
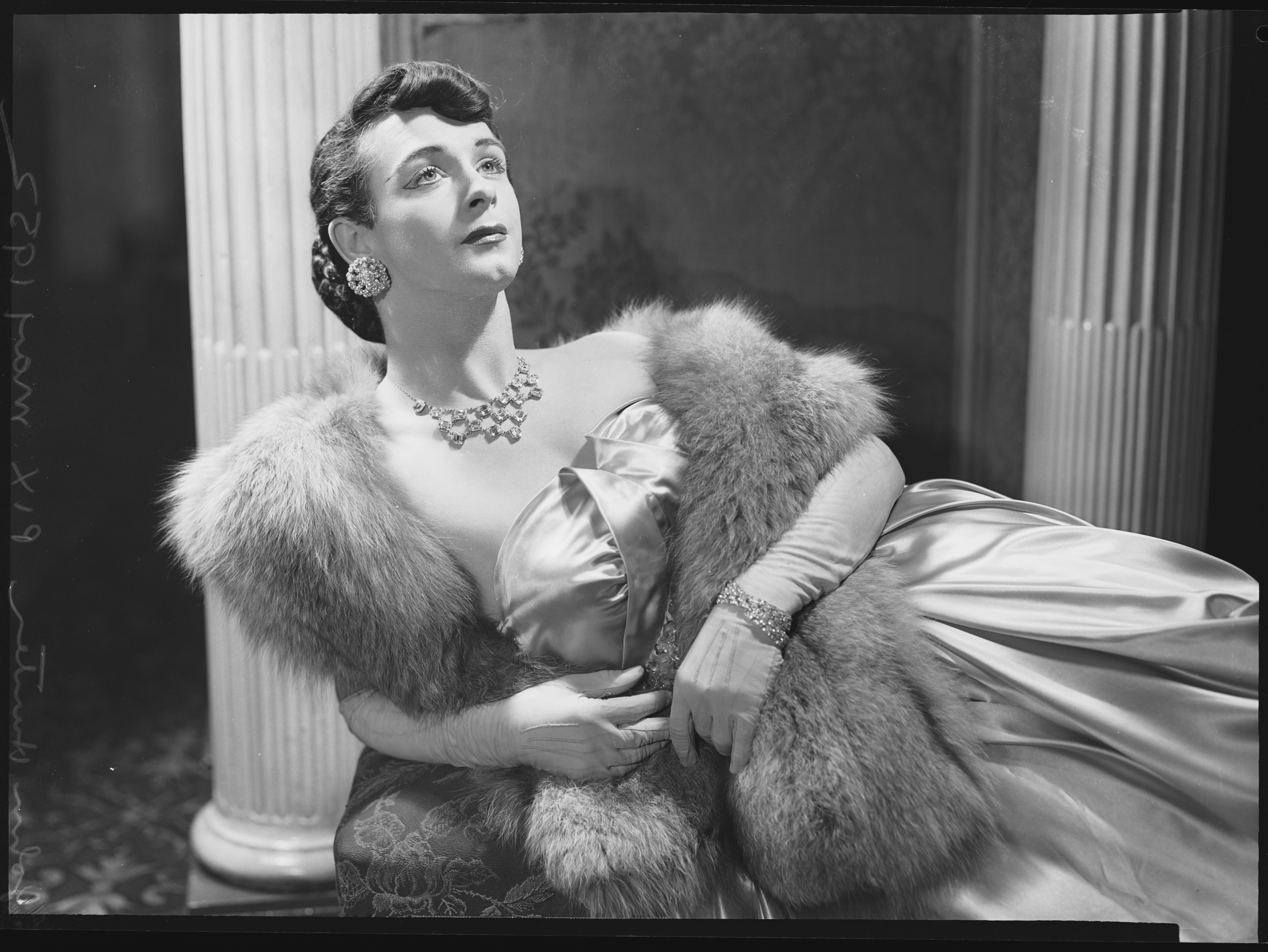
John Hunter, State Theatre, Sydney, May 1952

The term female impersonation refers to a type of theatrical performance where a man dresses in women's clothing for the sole purpose of entertaining an audience. The term female impersonator is sometimes used interchangeably with drag queen, although they are not the same. For example, in 1972, Esther Newton described a female impersonator as a "professional drag queen". She considered the term female impersonator to be the one that was (then) widely understood by heterosexual audiences. However, feminist and queer studies scholar Sarah French defined a clear separation between these two terms. She defined drag as an art form associated with queer identity, whereas female impersonation comes from a wide range of gender identity paradigms, including heteronormativity. Additionally, many drag artists view drag as a lived form of self-expression or creativity, and perceive drag as something that is not limited to the stage or to performance. In contrast, female impersonation is specifically limited to performance and may or may not involve an LGBTQI point of view.

Female impersonation can be traced back at least as far as ancient Greece. There was little to no gender equity then, and women held a lower social status. This meant male actors would play female roles during theatrical performances. This tradition continued for centuries but began to be less prevalent as motion pictures became popular. During the era of vaudeville, it was considered immodest for women to appear on stage. Due to that circumstance, some men became famous as "female impersonators", the most notable being Julian Eltinge. At the peak of his career, he was one of the most sought-after and highest-paid actors in the world. Andrew Tribble was another early female impersonator who gained fame on Broadway and in Black Vaudeville.

In the twentieth century, some gender impersonators, both female and male, in the United States became highly successful performing artists in non-LGBTQ nightclubs and theaters. There was a concerted effort by these working female and male impersonators in America to separate the art of gender impersonation from queer identity, with an overt representation of working gender impersonators as heterosexual. Some of the performers were in fact cisgender heterosexual men and women, but others were closeted LGBTQ individuals due to the politics and social environment of the period. It was criminal in many American cities to be homosexual, or for LGBTQ people to congregate, and it was therefore necessary for female and male impersonators to distance themselves from identifying as queer publicly to avoid criminal charges and loss of career. The need to hide and dissociate from queer identity was prevalent among gender impersonators working in non-LGBTQ nightclubs before heteronormative audiences as late as the 1970s.

Female impersonation has been and continues to be illegal in some places, which inspired the drag queen José Sarria to hand out labels to his friends reading, "I am a boy", so they could not be accused of female impersonation. American drag queen RuPaul once said, "I do not impersonate females! How many women do you know who wear seven-inch heels, four-foot wigs, and skintight dresses?" He also said, "I don't dress like a woman; I dress like a drag queen!"

=== Drag queens and kings ===
The meaning of the term drag queen has changed across time. The term first emerged in New York City in the 1950s, and initially had two meanings. The first meaning referred to an amateur performer who did not make a living in drag but may have participated in amateur public performances such as those held at a drag ball or a drag pageant. This was meant to draw a line differentiating amateurs performing in drag for fun from professional female impersonators who made a living performing in drag.

The second original meaning of drag queen was applied to men who chose to wear women's clothing on the streets, an act which was at that time illegal in New York City. Of this latter type, two additional slang terms were applied: square drag queens which meant "boys who looked like girls but who you knew were boys," and street queens who were queer male sex workers, often homeless, who dressed as women. This second use of the term was also layered with transphobic subtext, and the term drag queen was again meant to protect the professional female impersonator by allowing them to dissociate themselves from both aspects of queer culture and from sex workers to maintain respectability among the predominantly heteronormative audiences who employed them. This understanding of the term drag queen persisted through the 1960s.

In 1971, an article in Lee Brewster's Drag Queens magazine described a drag queen as a "homosexual transvestite" who is hyperfeminine, flamboyant, and militant. Drag queens were further described as having an attitude of superiority, and commonly courted by heterosexual men who would "not ordinarily participate in homosexual relationships". While the term drag queen implied "homosexual transvestite", the term drag carried no such connotations.

In the 1970s, drag queen was continually defined as a "homosexual transvestite". Drag was parsed as changing one's clothes to those of a different sex, while queen was said to refer to a homosexual man.

For much of history, drag queens were men, but in more modern times, cisgender and trans women, as well as non-binary people, also perform as drag queens. In a 2018 article, Psychology Today stated that drag queens are "most typically gay cisgender men (though there are many drag queens of varying sexual orientations and gender identities)".

Examples of trans-feminine drag queens, sometimes called trans queens, include Monica Beverly Hillz and Peppermint. Cisgender female drag queens are sometimes called faux queens or bioqueens, though critics of this practice assert that faux carries the connotation that the drag is fake, and that the use of bioqueen exclusively for cisgender females is a misnomer since trans-feminine queens exhibit gynomorphic features.

Drag queens' counterparts are drag kings: performers, usually women, who dress in exaggeratedly masculine clothing. Examples of drag kings include Landon Cider. Trans men who dress like drag kings are sometimes termed trans kings.

=== Alternative terms ===
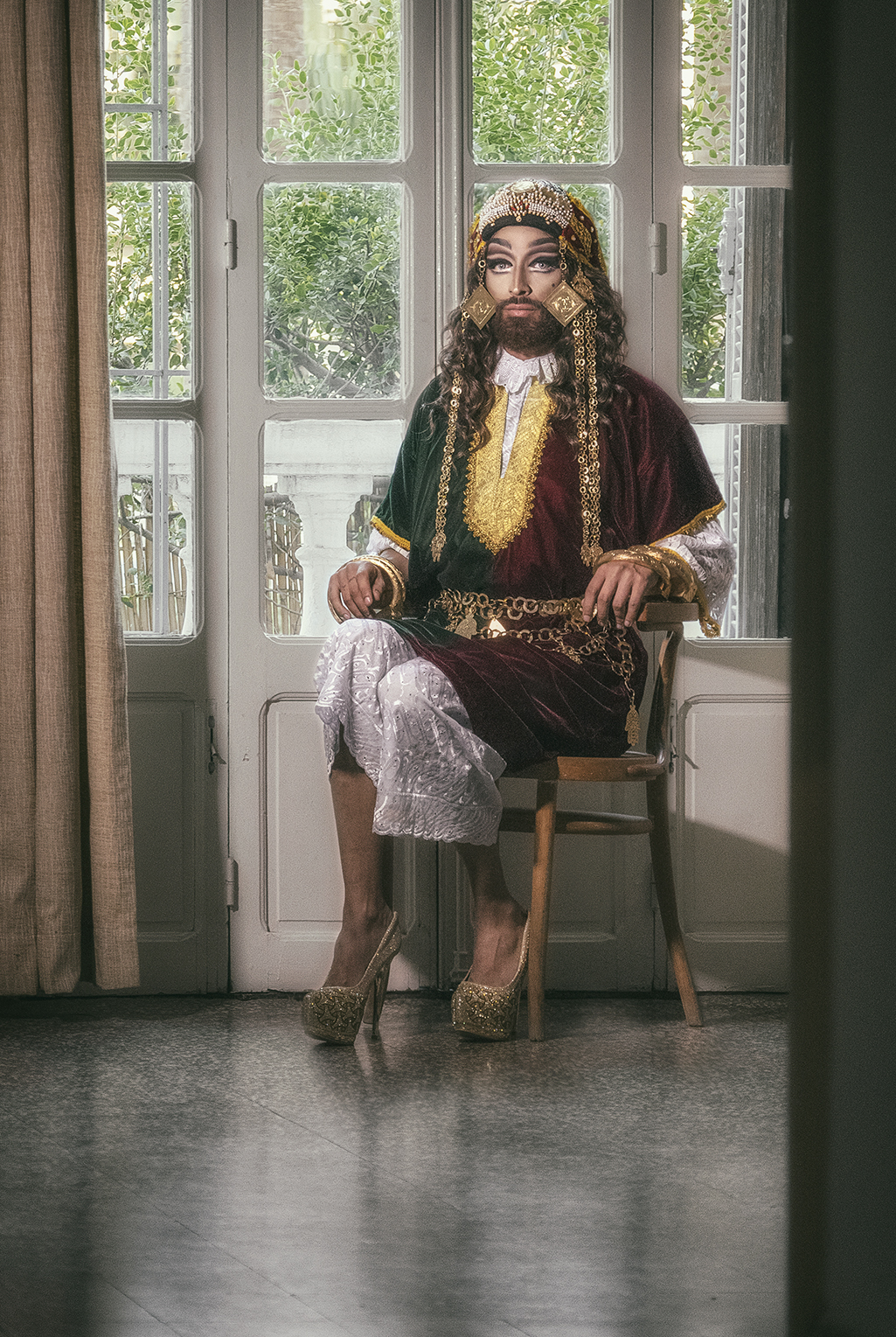
Khookha McQueer, Tunisian drag queen

Some drag queens may prefer to be referred to as "she" while in drag and desire to stay completely in character. Other drag performers are indifferent to which pronoun is used to refer to them. RuPaul has said, "You can call me he. You can call me she. You can call me Regis and Kathie Lee; I don't care! Just so long as you call me."

Drag queens are sometimes called transvestites, although that term also has many other connotations than the term drag queen and is not much favored by many drag queens themselves. The term tranny, an abbreviation of the term transvestite, has been adopted by some drag performers, notably RuPaul, and the gay male community in the United States, but it is considered offensive to most transgender and transsexual people.

Many drag performers refer to themselves as drag artists, as opposed to drag queens, as some contemporary forms of drag have become nonbinary. In Brazil, androgynous drag performers are sometimes called drag queer, as a form of gender neutrality.

Among drag queens and their contacts today, there is an ongoing debate about whether transgender drag queens are actually considered "drag queens". Some argue that, because a drag queen is defined as a man portraying a woman, transgender women cannot be drag queens. Drag kings are women who assume a masculine aesthetic, but this is not always the case, because there are also biokings, bioqueens, and AFAB queens, which are people who perform their own biological sex through a heightened or exaggerated gender presentation.

== History of drag ==
=== Canada ===
In the 1940s, John Herbert, who sometimes competed in drag pageants, was the victim of an attempted robbery while he was dressed as a woman. (Note: One source asserts that the attack occurred in 1947, another is vague on the timing, and The New York Times obituary of Herbert asserts that it occurred during Herbert's teens. The cause of the confusion may be the conflation of this arrest with Herbert's subsequent arrest for gross indecency. He served another sentence for indecency at a reformatory in Mimico in 1948.) His assailants falsely claimed that Herbert had solicited them for sex, and Herbert was accused and convicted of indecency under Canada's same-sex sexual activity law (which was not repealed until 1969). After being convicted, Herbert served time in a youth reformatory in Guelph, Ontario. (Note: One source states that Herbert was imprisoned for six months at Guelph, while another states that he spent four months there.) Herbert later served another sentence for indecency at reformatory in Mimico. Herbert wrote Fortune and Men's Eyes in 1964 based on his time behind bars. He included the character of Queenie as an authorial self-insertion.

In 1973, the first Canadian play about and starring a drag queen, Hosanna by Michel Tremblay, was performed at Théâtre de Quat'Sous in Montreal.

In 1977, the Canadian film Outrageous!, starring drag queen Craig Russell, became one of the first gay-themed films to break out into mainstream theatrical release.

=== India ===
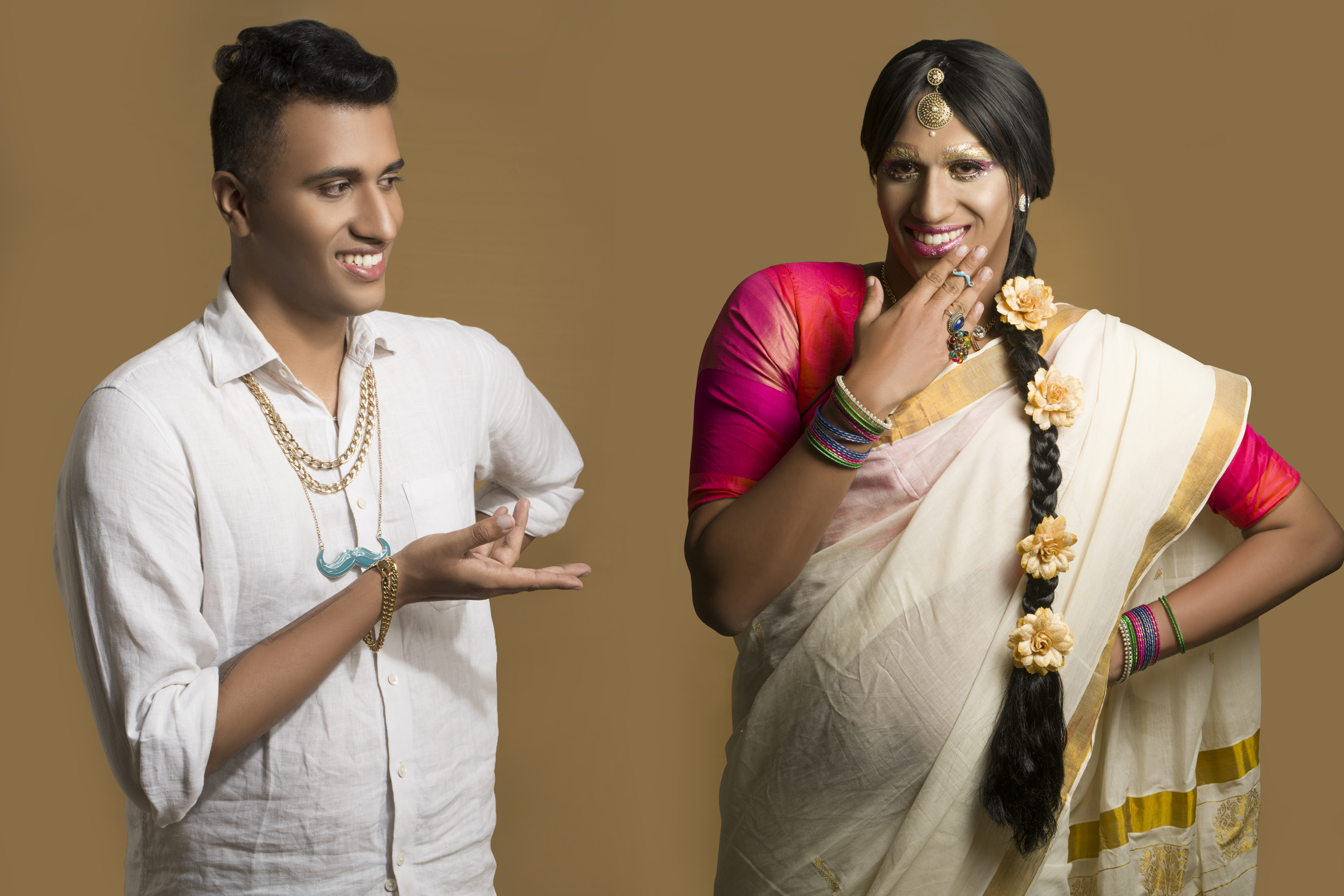
Alex Mathew (left) beside his drag persona Maya the Drag Queen (right)

In September 2018, the Supreme Court of India ruled that the application of Section 377 of the Indian Penal Code to consensual homosexual sex between adults was unconstitutional, "irrational, indefensible and manifestly arbitrary". Since then, drag culture in India has been growing and becoming the mainstream art culture. The hotel chain of Lalit Groups operates a franchise of clubs where drag performances are hosted in major cities of India, such as Mumbai, Delhi, and Bangalore.

Maya the Drag Queen, Rani Kohinoor (Sushant Divgikar), Lush Monsoon, Betta Naan Stop, Tropical Marca, Zeeshan Ali, and Patruni Sastry are some examples of Indian drag artists. In 2018, Hyderabad had its first drag convention. In 2020, India's first drag specific magazine Dragvanti began publication.

=== Lebanon ===
Lebanon is the only country in the Arab world with an increasingly visible drag scene. Drag culture has existed in Lebanon for several decades but gained popularity with the astronomical rise of Bassem Feghali, who came to prominence in the 1990s, becoming a household name for his impersonation of Lebanese female singers. Due to the global success of Rupaul's Drag Race, Beirut's drag scene has adopted various influences that blend American drag culture with local, unique cultural elements. The drag scene has grown so much that in 2019 Vogue magazine declared it a drag-aissance.

=== Paraguay ===
Usha Didi Gunatita was a pioneer of drag art during the later years of the dictatorship of Alfredo Stroessner. Many drag queens of later generations claim her as a reference, and base their characters on Usha's exaggerated characteristics in her performances. She is also remembered as one of the first trans people who was featured on Paraguayan television without being censored.

=== Philippines ===
Before being colonized by Spain in the mid-1500s, it was a national custom for men to dress in women's clothing. However, when the Spaniards arrived, they not only outlawed homosexuality but executed men that appeared to be homosexual. Spain cast a culture of Machismo onto the Philippines, causing any kind of queerness and queer culture to be heavily suppressed.

Nonetheless, in the early 1900s, drag started to reappear in the media. Drag became a key element of national pantomime theatre, and as time went on, drag queens appeared in other forms of theatre and in movies.

=== South Africa ===
Drag in South Africa emerged in the 1950s in major cities such as Johannesburg and Cape Town. It started in the form of underground pageants which created a safe space for members of the LGBTQ community in Apartheid South Africa, where people could be punished by law for being gay. Being gay was not legalized in South Africa until 1998, so pageants, such as the famous Miss Gay Western Cape, did not become official until the late 1990s.

Discrimination against drag is widespread in South Africa, and drag queens face the threat of violence because of being openly gay. Furthermore, there is not language to explore queerness in Xhosa, one of the indigenous languages of South Africa.

=== Taiwan ===
In 1994, entertainer Cai Tou established the male-to-female cross-dressing "Hongding Yiren (Chinese)" (Red-Top Artists) singing and dancing troupe, inspired by the ladyboy cabaret shows in Thailand. In 1998, the Public Television Service program "Fruity Ice Cream (Chinese)" featured the character "Grandma Fruit" (Sui Guo Nai Nai) in male-to-female cross-dressing; this character became a staple on television.

The introduction of Taiwanese drag culture began with the underground "Paradise Party" in the 1990s. This party served as the starting point for Taiwan's first generation of local drag queens while the rights of the gay community were still limited. Following the end of Paradise Party, the development of drag culture in Taiwan stagnated between approximately 1990 and 2010.

In 2006, Alvin (the "Drag Grandma") opened the bar "Café Dalida" in Ximending, and began regularly inviting drag queens to perform. In the 2010s, Taiwan saw the emergence of two new underground parties: "Werk party" and "Cum party"." These parties became the staging grounds for Taiwan's new generation of local drag queens, such as Nymphia Wind.

Following the resurgence, many local Taiwanese drag queens began to emerge. In 2020, the Taiwanese YouTube channel "FJ234" independently produced the online drag queen pageant show "Make a Diva." This program ran for two seasons. In 2024, Nymphia Wind won the sixteenth season of RuPaul's Drag Race, becoming the first person of East Asian descent to win an installment of the American series.

=== Thailand ===
After homosexual acts were decriminalized in Thailand in 1956, gay clubs and other queer spaces began opening, which led to the first cabaret. However, drag in Thailand was actually heavily influenced by drag queens from the Philippines as the first drag show started after the owner of a gay club saw drag queens from the Philippines perform in Bangkok. Therefore, drag shows started in Thailand in the mid-1970s and have become increasingly popular over time, especially in major cities like Bangkok.

=== United Kingdom ===
In Renaissance England, women were forbidden from performing on stage, so female roles were played by men or boys. The practice continued, as a tradition, when pantomimes became a popular form of entertainment in Europe during the late 1800s to the mid-1900s. The dame became a stock character with a range of attitudes from "charwoman" to "grande dame" who was mainly used for improvisation. A notable, and highly successful, pantomime dame from this period was Dan Leno.

Beyond theatre, in the 1800s, Molly houses became a place for gay men to meet, often dressed in drag. Despite homosexuality being outlawed, men would dress in women's clothing and attend these taverns and coffee houses to congregate and meet other, mostly gay, men.

By the mid-1900s, pantomime and the use of pantomime dames had declined, although it remains a popular Christmas tradition. The role of the dame, however, evolved to become more about the individual performer. Many female impersonators built up their own fan bases and began performing outside of their traditional pantomime roles.

=== United States ===
==== Origins ====
Drag performance in the United States had its roots in the female impersonations of performers in minstrel shows of the 19th century, followed by female impersonators working in vaudeville, burlesque, and the legitimate theatre in the late 19th century and early 20th century.

The Pansy Craze was a period of increased LGBTQ visibility in American popular culture from the late-1920s until the mid-1930s; during the "craze," drag queens – known as "pansy performers" – experienced a surge in underground popularity, especially in New York City, Chicago, Los Angeles, and San Francisco. The exact dates of the movement are debated, with a range from the late 1920s until 1935.

The term "pansy craze" was coined by the historian George Chauncey in his 1994 book Gay New York.

==== First drag balls ====
The first person known to describe himself as "the queen of drag" was William Dorsey Swann, born enslaved in Hancock, Maryland, who in the 1880s started hosting drag balls in Washington, DC attended by other men who were formerly enslaved. The balls were often raided by the police, as documented in the newspapers. In 1896, Swann was convicted and sentenced to 10 months in jail on the false charge of "keeping a disorderly house" (a euphemism for running a brothel). He requested a pardon from President Grover Cleveland, but was denied.

==== Nightclubs ====
In the early to mid-1900s, female impersonation had become tied to the LGBTQ community and thus criminality, so it had to change forms and locations. It moved from being popular mainstream entertainment to something done only at night in disreputable areas, such as San Francisco's Tenderloin. Here female impersonation started to evolve into what we today know as drag and drag queens. Drag queens such as José Sarria first came to prominence in these clubs. People went to these nightclubs to play with the boundaries of gender and sexuality, and it became a place for the LGBTQ community, especially gay men, to feel accepted.

As LGBTQ culture has slowly become more accepted in American society, drag has also become more, though not totally, acceptable in today's society. In the 1940s and 1950s, Arthur Blake was one of the few female impersonators to be successful in both gay and mainstream entertainment, becoming famous for his impersonations of Bette Davis, Carmen Miranda, and Eleanor Roosevelt in night clubs. At the invitation of the Roosevelts, he performed his impersonation of Eleanor at the White House. He impersonated Davis and Miranda in the 1952 film Diplomatic Courier.

==== Protests ====
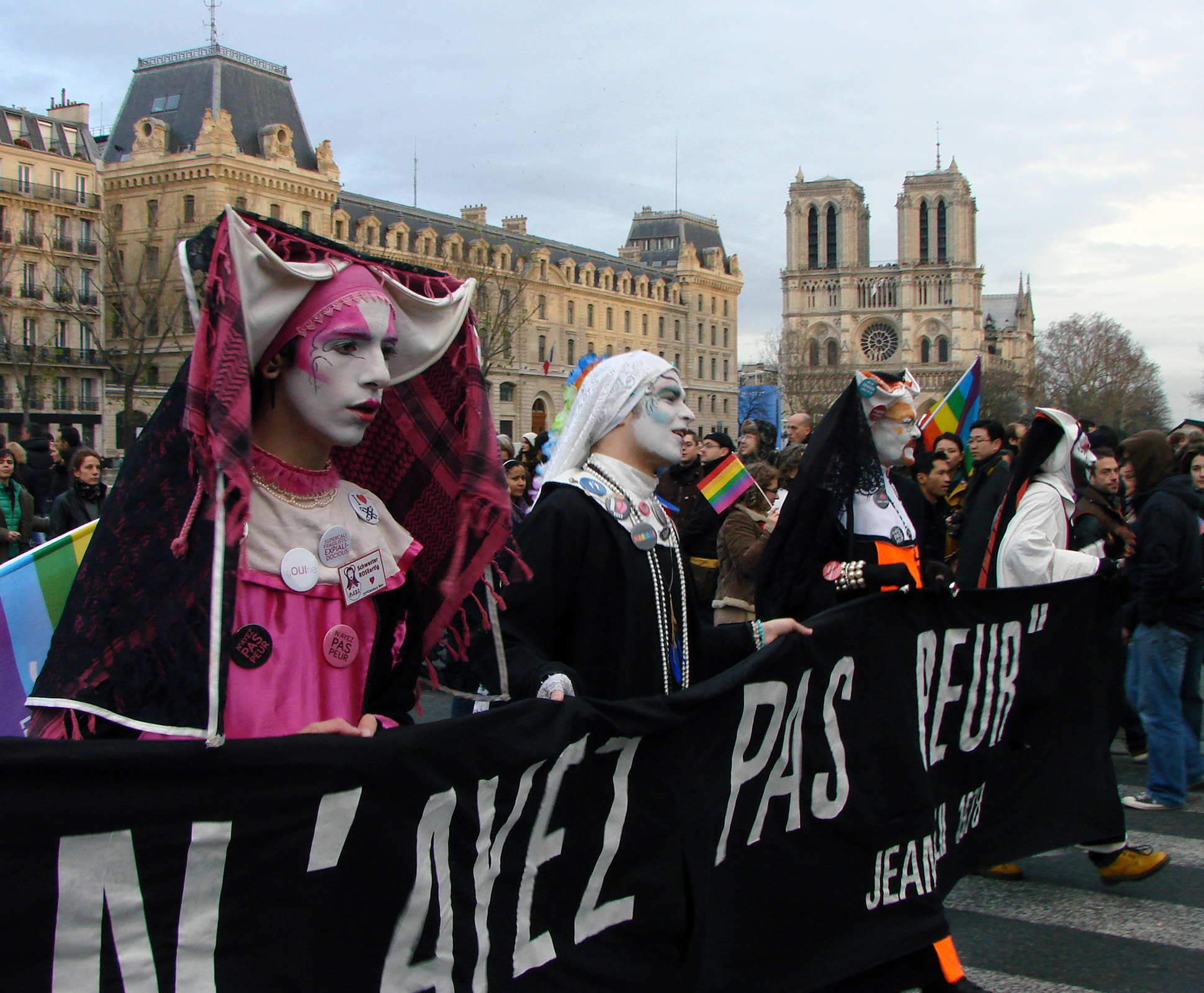
Sisters of Perpetual Indulgence at a marriage equality protest in Paris, 2012

The Cooper Donuts Riot was a May 1959 incident in Los Angeles in which drag queens, lesbians, transgender women, and gay men rioted; it was one of the first LGBTQ protests in the United States.

The Compton's Cafeteria riot, which involved drag queens and others, occurred in San Francisco in 1966. It marked the beginning of transgender activism in San Francisco.

On 17 March 1968, in Los Angeles, to protest entrapment and harassment by the Los Angeles Police Department, two drag queens known as "The Princess" and "The Duchess" held a St. Patrick's Day party at Griffith Park, a popular cruising spot and a frequent target of police activity. More than 200 gay men socialized throughout the day.

Drag queens were also involved in the Stonewall riots, a series of spontaneous, violent demonstrations by members of the LGBTQ community against a police raid that took place in the early morning hours of 28 June 1969, at the Stonewall Inn, located in the Greenwich Village neighborhood of Manhattan, New York City. The riots are widely considered to be the catalyst for the gay liberation movement and the modern fight for LGBTQ rights in the United States.

During the summer of 1976, a restaurant in Fire Island Pines, New York, denied entry to a visitor in drag named Terry Warren. When Warren's friends in Cherry Grove heard what had happened, they dressed up in drag, and, on 4 July 1976, sailed to the Pines by water taxi. This turned into a yearly event where drag queens go to the Pines, called the Invasion of the Pines.

==== Politics ====
In 1961, drag queen José Sarria ran for the San Francisco Board of Supervisors, becoming the first openly gay candidate for public office in the United States.

In 1991, drag queen Terence Alan Smith, as Joan Jett Blakk, ran against Richard M. Daley for the office of mayor of Chicago, Illinois. The campaign was chronicled in the 1991 video Drag in for Votes. After qualifying for presidency on his 35th birthday, Smith announced a campaign for presidency in 1992 under the slogan "Lick Bush in '92!" and documented in the 1993 video of the same name. Smith also ran for president in 1996 with the slogan "Lick Slick Willie in '96!" In each of these campaigns, Smith ran on the Queer Nation Party ticket. In June 2019, a play based on Smith's 1992 presidential campaign, titled Ms. Blakk for President, written by Tarell Alvin McCraney and Tina Landau and starring McCraney in the title role, opened at Steppenwolf Theater in Chicago.

In 2019, Maebe A. Girl became the first drag queen elected to public office in the United States when she was elected to the Silver Lake Neighborhood Council.

Ladycat De'Ore is a drag queen based in Colorado who is known for advocating for the rights of transgender persons and in particular for Black transgender women.

==== Other ====
D'Arcy Drollinger was appointed San Francisco's first drag laureate in May 2023. The role consists of serving as an ambassador for San Francisco's LGBTQ, arts, nightlife, and entertainment communities.

Pickle Drag Queen became West Hollywood's first drag laureate on International Drag Day, 16 July 2023.

== Drag families ==
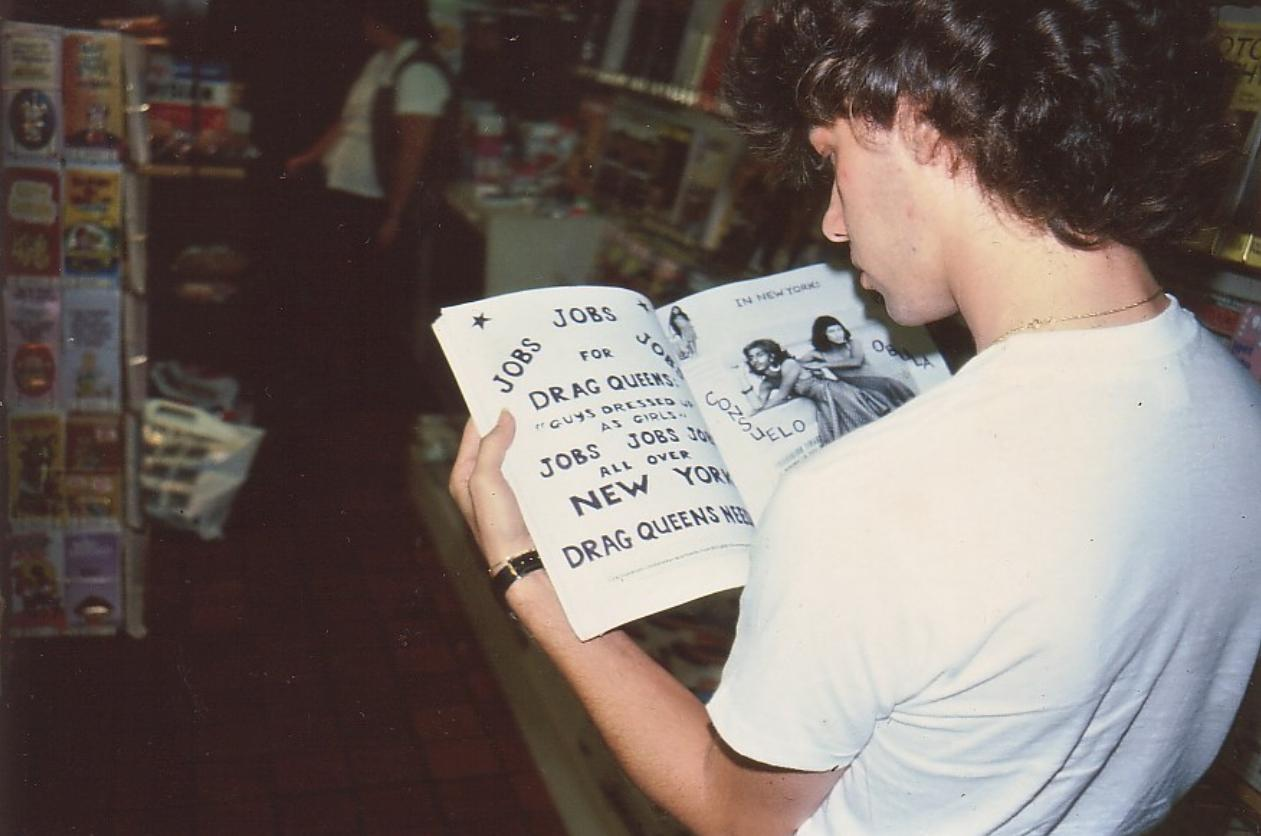
Advert for drag queen jobs as spoofed in Wild Side Story

Drag families are a part of ball culture and drag houses.

=== Drag mother ===
A drag queen may either pick a drag name, or be given it by a friend or a "drag mother". Drag mothers often come to lead their drag house, or start their own, and are more experienced and acclaimed members of the drag community. As such, drag mothers and drag daughters have a mentor-apprentice relationship. This is because drag mothers help hone the skills of their younger queens, or drag daughters, by teaching them things such as how to apply makeup, walk in heels, sew clothing, dance, sing, etc. In addition to this, drag mothers also promote their drag children at events and performances.

== Art of drag ==
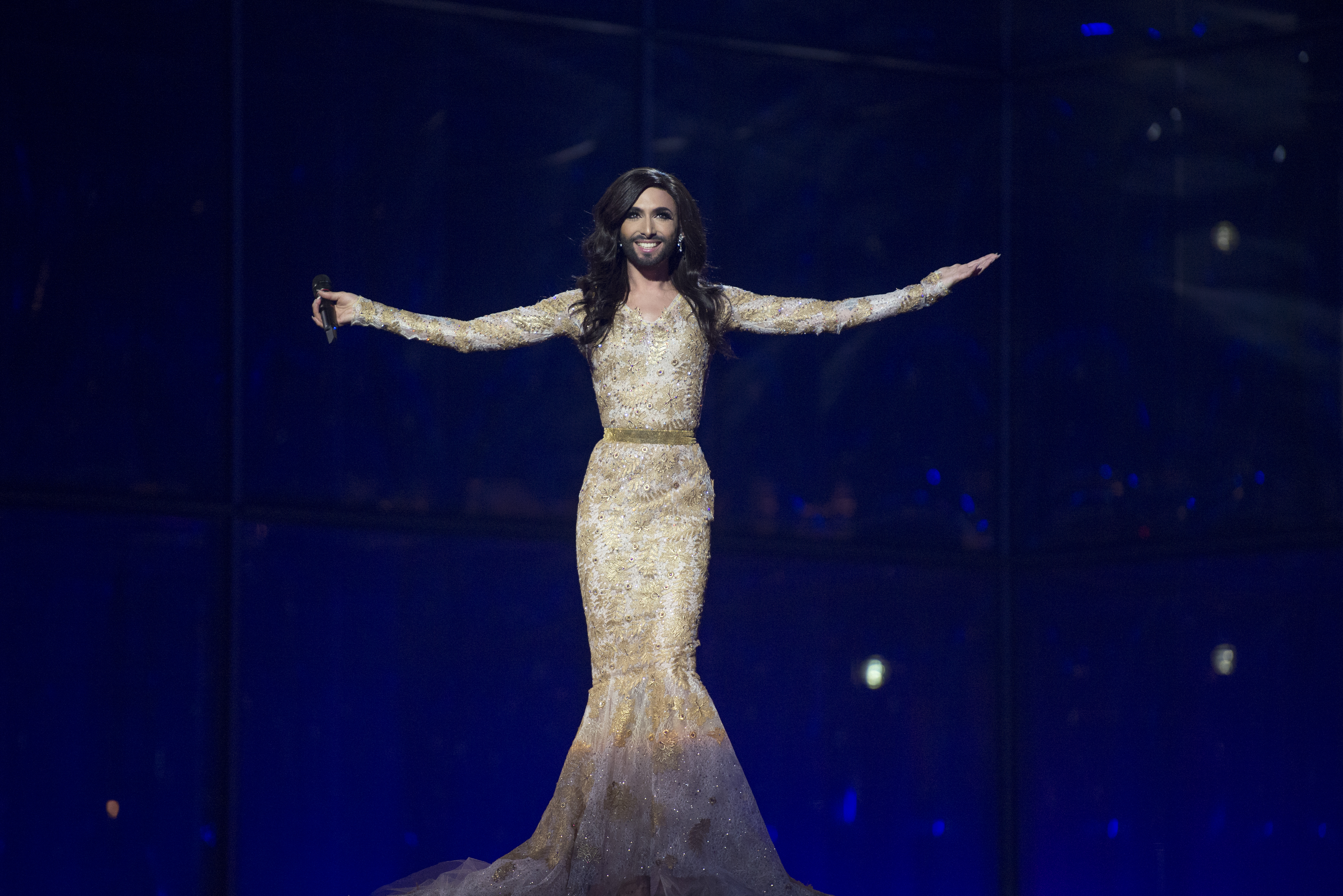
Conchita Wurst, winner of the 2014 Eurovision Song Contest

The process of getting into drag or into character can take hours. A drag queen may aim for a certain style, celebrity impression, or message with their look. Hair, make-up, and costumes are the most important essentials for drag queens. Drag queens tend to go for a more exaggerated look with a lot more makeup than a typical woman would wear.

Some people do drag simply as a means of self-expression, but often drag queens (once they have completed a look) will go out to clubs and bars and perform in a "drag show". Many drag queens dress up for money by doing different shows, but there are also drag queens that have full-time jobs but still enjoy dressing up in drag as a hobby.

Many parts of the drag show, and of the drag queens' other intellectual properties, cannot be protected by intellectual property law. To substitute for the lack of legal protection, drag queens revert to social norms to protect their intellectual property.

== In entertainment ==
=== Drag shows and venues ===
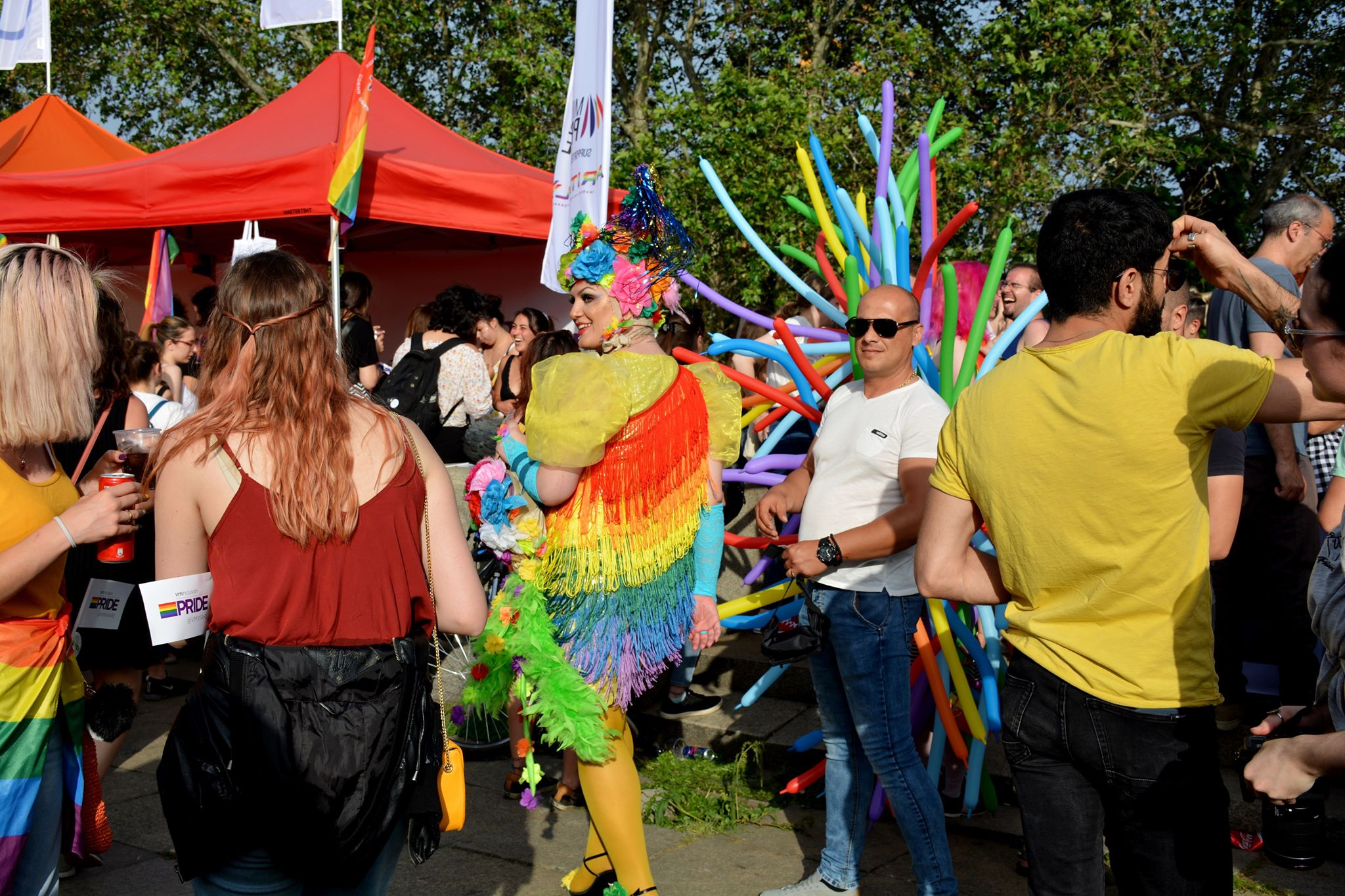
Drag queen at Sofia Pride in Bulgaria, 2019

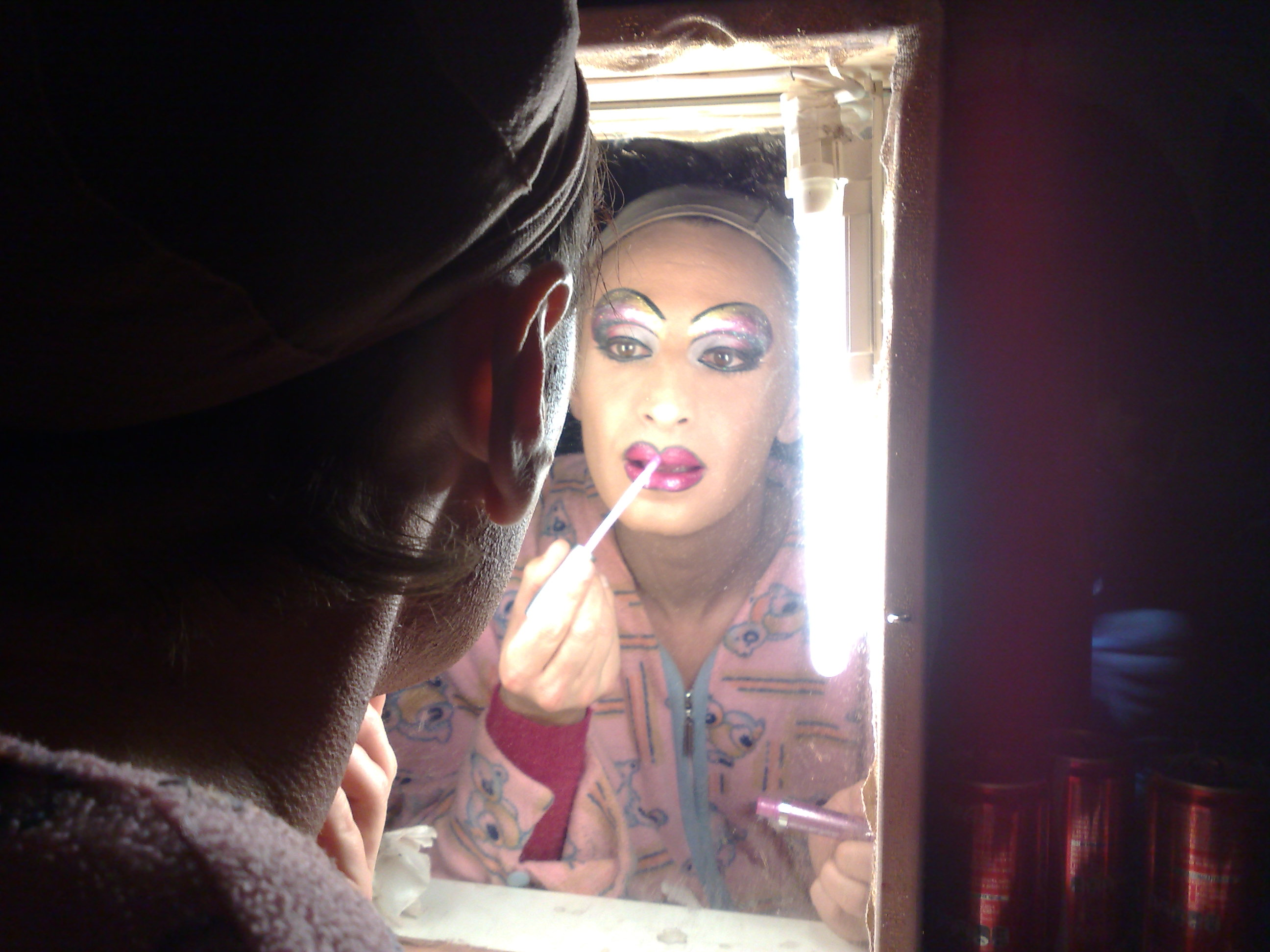
A drag queen preparing stage makeup

A drag show is a piece of entertainment consisting of a variety of songs, monologues or skits featuring either single performers or groups of performers in drag meant to entertain an audience. They range from amateur performances at small bars to elaborately staged theatrical presentations. Many drag shows feature performers singing or lip-synching to songs while performing a pre-planned pantomime, or dancing. The performers often don elaborate costumes and makeup, and sometimes dress to imitate various famous female singers or personalities. Some events are centered around drag, such as Southern Decadence, where the majority of festivities are led by the Grand Marshals, who are traditionally drag queens.

In 2020, the first West End play to feature an all drag cast, Death Drop, launched at the Garrick Theatre in London. Produced by Tuckshop and Trafalgar Entertainment it was written by drag performer Holly Stars and starred Courtney Act, Monet X Change, Latrice Royale, Willam, Holly Stars, Anna Phylactic, LoUis CYfer, Don One, Kemah Bob, Myra Dubois and Vinegar Strokes and was directed by Jesse Jones. The show ran for a number of weeks in November and December 2020 before being closed due to a COVID lockdown in London. The show reopened on 19 May 2021 and ran until its scheduled end date of 11 July 2021. Death Drop received 5-star reviews from many publications including Gay Times and Attitude magazine and was widely celebrated for breaking new ground in theatrical drag performance.

=== In music ===
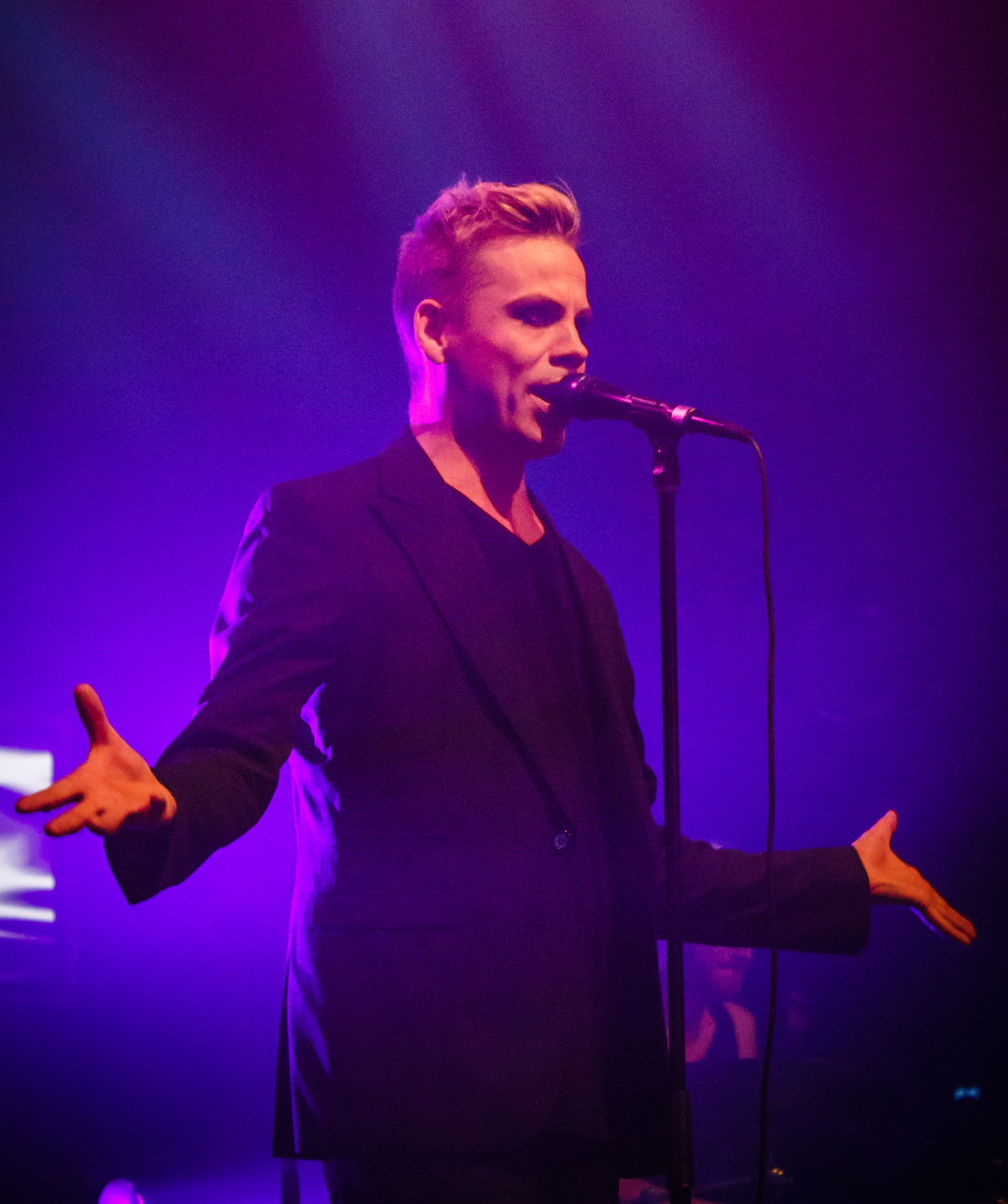
Cristal Snow, Finnish drag artist, performing in 2012

While some male music celebrities wear exaggerated feminine clothing as part of their show, they are not necessarily drag queens. An example of a band that utilised drag as part of their stage act was the New York Dolls. Similarly, English new wave singer Boy George wears drag queen style clothes and cosmetics; he once stated he was not a drag queen but on another occasions he said he was. However, RuPaul is a professional drag queen performer and singer.

Examples of songs where lyrics refer to drag queens:

- "Lola" by The Kinks (or possibly a transgender woman)
- "Dude (Looks Like a Lady)" by Aerosmith
- "The Lady Is a Vamp" by Spice Girls
- "Ballad of Cleo and Joe" by Cyndi Lauper
- "King for a Day" by Green Day
- "Cherry Lips" by Garbage
- "Born This Way" by Lady Gaga
- "Verbatim" by Mother Mother
- "He's a Woman, She's a Man" by Scorpions
- "Pretty Lady" by Ke$ha & Detox Icunt
- "Andrew in Drag" by The Magnetic Fields
- "Rise Like a Phoenix" by Conchita Wurst (represented Austria at the 2014 Eurovision Song Contest and won)
- "Divine" by Antony and the Johnsons
- "The End." from the album The Black Parade by My Chemical Romance
- "Drag Queen" by The Strokes
- "LGBT" by cupcaKke
- "C.L.A.T" by Aja, Peppermint, Sasha Velour and Alexis Michelle

=== In television ===
Drag queen Don McLean (drag name Lori Shannon) appeared in three episodes of the CBS sitcom All in the Family as drag queen Beverly LaSalle: "Archie the Hero" (1975), in which Archie Bunker gives her mouth-to-mouth resuscitation, not realizing she is male; "Beverly Rides Again" (1976), in which Archie uses her to play a practical joke on a friend; and "Edith's Crisis of Faith, Part 1" (1977), in which her murder leads Edith Bunker to question her faith in God. The role was noteworthy for its uncommonly respectful and sympathetic treatment of Beverly as a "transvestite".

British entertainer Paul O'Grady was a staple of light entertainment and variety shows on UK television from the early 80s to the mid 90s, playing the drag persona Lily Savage: an over-the-top, glamorous diva character for comedic effect.

CODCO was a Canadian sketch comedy series which aired on CBC Television from 1988 to 1993; two of its actors, Tommy Sexton and Greg Malone, were especially renowned for drag-based impersonations of celebrity women such as Queen Elizabeth, Barbara Frum, Barbara Walters, Tammy Faye Bakker and Margaret Thatcher. In one famous sketch, Malone as Frum moderated a debate between Andy Jones as a gay teacher who had been fired from his job for testing HIV-positive and Sexton as Clarabelle Otterhead, the president of an anti-gay lobby group called Citizens Outraged by Weird Sex (or COWS).

Drag queen Amnesia Sparkles tried out for American Idol in 2002.

What Would You Do?, airing since early 2008, has had episodes featuring drag queens.

In mid-2008, RuPaul began producing RuPaul's Drag Race, a reality television game show which began airing in February 2009. The premise of the program has several drag queens compete to be selected by RuPaul and a panel of judges as "America's next drag superstar". It inspired the similar spin-off shows RuPaul's Drag U and RuPaul's Drag Race: All Stars, as well as the international franchise editions Drag Race Thailand, The Switch Drag Race (Chile), RuPaul's Drag Race UK, Canada's Drag Race, Drag Race Holland, Drag Race España, RuPaul's Drag Race Down Under, Drag Race France, Drag Race Philippines among many others.

In 2018, American Idol featured a drag queen, Adam Sanders (drag name Ada Vox) as one of its contestants. He made it to the top ten.

In 2018, Celebrity Big Brother featured Queen Shane Jenek (drag name Courtney Act) as one of its contestants, placing first in the season with 49.43% of the public vote.

Also in 2018, So You Think You Can Dance featured Jay Jackson (drag name Laganja Estranja) as one of its contestants.

The Netflix show Dancing Queen, also released in 2018, starred Justin Johnson (drag name Alyssa Edwards) and his dance studio, Beyond Belief Dance Company.

A 2018 episode of The Simpsons, titled "Werking Mom", featured many drag queens, including cameos from RuPaul and Raja (the season three winner of RuPaul's Drag Race).

Gingzilla, also known as Ben Hudson and the "Glamonster", an Australian drag queen, appeared on The X Factor in 2018, and America's Got Talent in 2019.

Dragnificent! is a television series on the American network TLC. The show started as a special branded as Drag Me Down the Aisle, which aired on 9 March 2019. It features Alexis Michelle, BeBe Zahara Benet, Jujubee, and Thorgy Thor, four drag queens who are all RuPaul's Drag Race alumnae, helping an engaged woman to plan her upcoming wedding. On 15 January 2020, TLC announced that it had given a full season run to Dragnificent!, a new show to be based on the Drag Me Down the Aisle special. The series premiered on 19 April 2020.

The Netflix show AJ and the Queen, released in 2020, followed "Ruby Red, a bigger-than-life but down-on-her-luck drag queen [played by RuPaul] who travels across America from club to club in a rundown 1990s R/V with her unlikely sidekick AJ, a recently orphaned, tough-talking, scrappy ten-year-old stowaway. As the two misfits travel from city to city, Ruby's message of love and acceptance winds up touching people and changing their lives for the better."

In 2020, RuPaul became the first drag queen to host Saturday Night Live, though he was not in drag at the time.

In 2020–21, British drag queen Holly Stars wrote and performed in two seasons of a mockumentary series, Holly Stars: Inspirational, broadcast on OutTV,

Queen of the Universe, a drag queen singing competition television series hosted by Graham Norton with four pop music judges, premiered on Paramount+ on 2 December 2021. On 23 June 2023, the series was canceled after two seasons.

== In education ==
While drag queens are entertainers, they play a role in educating people on gender roles and stereotyping. Professor Stephen Schacht of Plattsburgh State University of New York began introducing his and his students' experiences of attending a drag show to his gender/sexualities class to challenge his students' ideas of dichotomy. Over time, he began inviting students to attend with him. He gathered from his students that after attending the drag show, they had a new appreciation for gender and sexuality and often became very vocal about their new experiences in the classroom.

=== With children ===
Nina West, Drag Race season eleven contestant and winner of Miss Congeniality, and producer of Drag Is Magic, an EP of children's music about the art form, says she hopes to inspire them to "dream big, be kind, and be their perfect selves." West feels the art form is "an opportunity for children to get creative and think outside the boxes us silly adults have crafted for them." Marti Gould Cummings said something similar when a video of them performing "Baby Shark" at a drag brunch event went viral. "Anyone who thinks drag isn't for children is wrong," said Cummings, "Drag is expression, and children are such judgment-free beings; they don't really care what you're wearing, just what you're performing." As of May 2019, the video has been viewed over 806,000 times.

West responded to critics who question if children are too young to experience drag, saying, "Drag is an opportunity for anyone – including and especially children – to reconsider the masks we are all forced to wear daily." West added, "Children are inundated with implicit imagery from media about what is 'boy' and what is 'girl.' And I believe that almost all kids are really less concerned about playing with a toy that's supposedly aligned to their gender, and more concerned with playing with toys that speak to them."

John Casey, an adjunct professor at Wagner College in New York City, posits in The Advocate,

"[Drag queens] are incredibly talented, and they are trying to live their lives, and in the process, brighten the lives of those around them. That's the message parents should be communicating to their kids, at any age. It's all about acceptance and being loved for who you are."

Separately from kids watching drag, the phenomenon of drag kids is relatively recent. In September 2019, The New York Times published a guess that there are about a hundred children who do drag in the U.S., with Desmond is Amazing being the one with the most followers. The mainstream access to drag queens on television exponentially increased in 2009 when RuPaul's Drag Race started airing.

However, since 2022, exposing kids to drag has become somewhat controversial. Lawmakers in states such as Arizona, Florida, and Texas are attempting to ban minors from attending drag shows and punish parents who expose their kids to drag. These attempts to ban minors from watching drag are based on allegations of drag being a form of perversion and hypersexualization. Some have argued that these accusations are the same that were leveled against homosexual men since the Lavender Scare of the 1950s. Those who disagree with the accusations have argued that drag queens provide a safe and creative environment for young children, especially LGBTQ children, and are a source of both education and entertainment.

==== Story time in libraries ====
In December 2015, Radar Productions and Michelle Tea developed the concept of Drag Queen Story Hour. Launched at the San Francisco Public Library, Drag Queen Story Hour was adopted by the Brooklyn Public Library in the summer of 2016, and has since traveled to various libraries, museums, bookstores, recreation centers, and parks across the United States, Canada, and the United Kingdom.

Such events sometimes prompt opposition against the libraries and organizers. In one instance in California, men belonging to the far-right group known as the Proud Boys arrived in a group and disrupted the event by shouting homophobic and transphobic phrases at the crowd. The County Sheriff's Office opened a hate crime investigation into the incident due to the nature of the disruption. Proud Boys sometimes bring guns for intimidation purposes. Some leftist groups, such as the Elm Fork John Brown Gun Club, organize armed counter-protests to keep protesters out of the building. This usually leads to the presence of police to ensure that both groups don't harm each other.

== Societal reception ==
Drag has come to be a celebrated and important aspect of modern gay life, but has also been criticized for degrading women. In the era of second-wave feminism some women "were angry and appalled by what they perceived as the charade of femininity expressed by some drag queens and transsexual women." These critics compared drag to blackface and saw it "as a kind of gender minstrel."

Many gay bars and clubs around the world hold drag shows as regular events or for special parties. Several "International Drag Day" holidays have been started over the years to promote the shows. In the United States, Drag Day is typically celebrated in early March.

A televised drag competition, RuPaul's Drag Race, is the most successful program on the Logo television network. In 2016, the show won a Primetime Emmy Award for Outstanding Host for a Reality or Reality-Competition Program. In 2018, the show became the first show to win a Primetime Emmy Award for Outstanding Reality-Competition Program and a Primetime Emmy Award for Outstanding Host for a Reality or Reality-Competition Program in the same year.

RuPaul received a star on the Hollywood Walk of Fame for his contributions to the television industry on 16 March 2018, making him the first drag queen to be given such an award.

=== Moral panic ===
A moral panic called drag panic has emerged in the United States in relation to drag queen performers. It alleges that contact between children and drag queens would involve drag queens attempting to molest them or indoctrinate them into the "queer way of life". This moral panic has also been linked to the LGBTQ grooming conspiracy theory, also from the United States.

== See also ==
- Crossplay (cosplay)
- Drag culture in New York City
- Finocchio's Club
- Imperial Court System
- Köçek
- List of drag queens
- List of drag queens in New York City
- List of transgender-related topics
- The Adventures of Priscilla, Queen of the Desert
- The Pink Mirror
