= Thorgy Thor =

American drag queen performer and musician

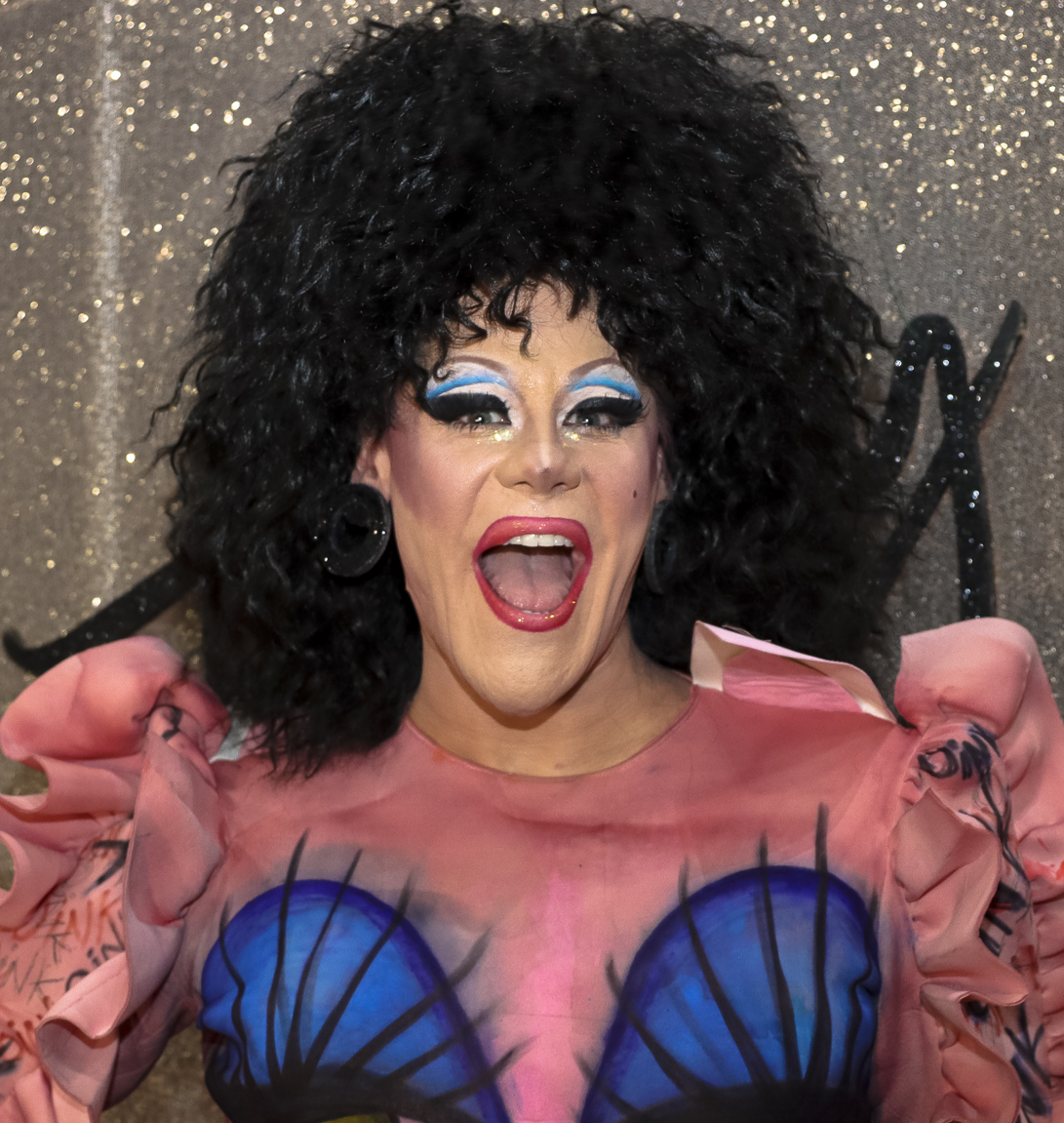
- Thorgy Thor at RuPaul's DragCon LA, 2022
- Born: Shane Thor Galligan; May 25, 1984 (age 42); Ronkonkoma, New York, U.S.
- Education: University of Hartford; State University of New York, Purchase (BM)
- Occupations: Drag queen; violinist
- Years active: 2003–present
- Known for: RuPaul's Drag Race (season 8); RuPaul's Drag Race: All Stars (season 3)
- Website: thorgy.com

Thorgy Thor is the stage name of Shane Thor Galligan, an American drag queen and musician who came to international attention on the eighth season of RuPaul's Drag Race and on the third season of All Stars.

== Early life ==
Shane Thor Galligan was born and raised in Ronkonkoma, New York on Long Island.

Galligan studied music at the University of Hartford Hartt School in Connecticut before graduating from the State University of New York, Purchase with a Bachelor of Music in both viola and violin performance in 2006. He also knows how to play the cello.

His mother, Elaine Frantzen Galligan (born March 22, 1953), died from cancer on March 20, 2005.

== Career ==
=== Drag ===
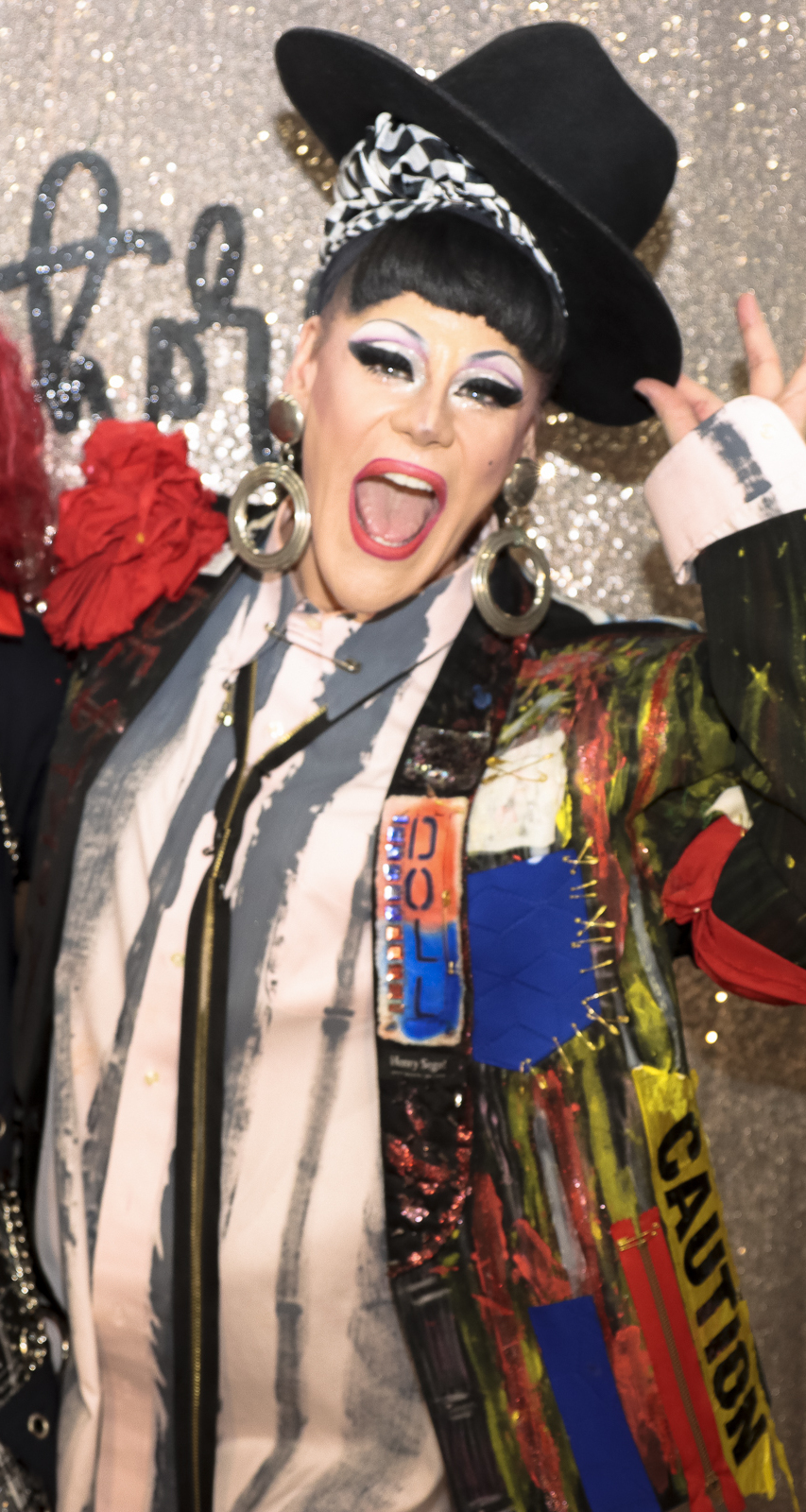
Thorgy Thor at RuPaul's DragCon LA in 2022

Thorgy Thor moved to Brooklyn in 2006 and considers herself a Brooklyn queen. She lived in Greenpoint, Brooklyn as of 2021. She has said Brooklyn's drag style has contributed to her aesthetic.

Galligan's first drag performance was as Frank N. Furter from The Rocky Horror Show. He was also Marvel Ann in the theater version of Psycho Beach Party. His original drag name was Shananigans; as Thorgy Thor she won the LEGEND award at the 2014 Brooklyn Nightlife Awards.

Having auditioned for Drag Race since season one, Galligan, as Thorgy Thor, was announced to be competing on the eighth season of RuPaul's Drag Race on February 1, 2016. She placed sixth out of twelve overall, losing to Chi Chi Devayne in the seventh episode. Thorgy was brought back for the third season of RuPaul's Drag Race: All Stars, revealed on October 20, 2017. Thorgy got eliminated in ninth place by season 2 and 3 queen Shangela. Thorgy's response to being eliminated, "Oh Jesus, gross", was turned into a three-second video clip and became a viral meme. During the show's finale, Thorgy Thor was the only queen to vote for Shangela, despite a previously rocky relationship.

Thorgy Thor appears with BeBe Zahara Benet, Jujubee and Alexis Michelle in the TLC special Drag Me Down the Aisle, which aired on March 9, 2019. The special was expanded into a full series titled Dragnificent! which premiered on April 19, 2020.

=== Music ===
Thorgy Thor contributed to the albums Christmas Queens 2 (2016) and Christmas Queens 3 (2017). She was out of drag in the music video for Trinity The Tuck's "I Call Shade" in February 2019.

She has performed as an instrumentalist at Le Poisson Rouge, Lincoln Center and Carnegie Hall. In 2018, Thorgy Thor and conductor Daniel Bartholomew-Poyser created the symphony show "Thorgy and the Thorchestra", which was staged for the first time by Symphony Nova Scotia in Halifax, Nova Scotia, Canada in conjunction with Halifax Pride. The show blends orchestral performances of traditional and modern classical repertoire and contemporary pop songs. The show was subsequently performed with other orchestras in Canada and the United States, including the Vancouver Symphony Orchestra in Vancouver, British Columbia, the Charlotte Symphony Orchestra in Charlotte, North Carolina, and the Kamloops Symphony Orchestra in Kamloops, British Columbia.

The creation and debut of Thorgy and the Thorchestra are profiled as part of Disruptor Conductor, Sharon Lewis's 2019 documentary film about Bartholomew-Poyser.

== Filmography ==
=== Film/Television ===
Year	Title	Role	Notes
2013	Getting Go: The Go Doc Project	Herself	Uncredited
2014	Mozart in the Jungle	Herself	Season 3, Episode 9
2016	RuPaul's Drag Race (season 8)	Herself	Contestant (6th place)
2016	RuPaul's Drag Race: Untucked	Herself	
2018	RuPaul's Drag Race All Stars (season 3)	Herself	Contestant (10th place)
2019	Drag Me Down the Aisle	Herself	
2019	The Queens	Herself	
2019–20	Dragnificent!	Herself	Also known as Drag Me Down the Aisle
2019	Disruptor Conductor	Herself	
2023	Drag Me to Dinner	Herself	Hulu original

=== Web series ===
Year	Title	Role	Notes	Ref.
2016	Bus Buddies	Herself	Guest, with Bob the Drag Queen	
2016	RuPaul's Drag Race: Untucked	Herself	Season 8	
2018	Watcha Packin'	Herself	Guest	
2020	Love Hotline	Herself	Co-Host	
2020-2025	The Pit Stop	Herself	Guest, 3 episodes	
2021	Out of the Closet	Herself	Guest	
2021	Purse First Impressions	Herself	Guest (season 2); co-host (season 3) with Bob the Drag Queen	
2023	Glam Slam	Herself	Contestant	
2023	Very Delta	Herself	Guest	

=== Music videos ===
Year	Title	Artist	Ref.
2017	"Let It Snow"	Christmas Queens	
2018	"Where My Man At"	Velo ft Manila Luzon and Eureka O'Hara	
2019	"I Call Shade"	Trinity The Tuck	
2019	"Yellow Cloud"	Trixie Mattel	

== Discography ==
=== Singles ===
==== Featured singles ====
Title	Year	Album
"Sitting on a Secret" (RuPaul featuring Aja, Chi Chi DeVayne, Milk, Morgan McMichaels, & Thorgy Thor)	2018	Non-album single

== See also ==
- LGBTQ culture in New York City
- List of LGBTQ people from New York City
