= Dragnificent! =

American television series

- Starring: Alexis Michelle; BeBe Zahara Benet; Jujubee; Thorgy Thor
- Country of origin: United Studies
- Original language: English
- No. of seasons: 1
- No. of episodes: 7

Production
- Executive producers: Justin Wineburgh; Andy Singer
- Running time: 40-42 minutes
- Production companies: Alkemy X, Inc.

Original release
- Network: TLC
- Release: March 9, 2019 – May 18, 2020

Dragnificent! is a television series on the American network TLC. The show started as a special branded as Drag Me Down the Aisle which aired on March 9, 2019. It features Alexis Michelle, BeBe Zahara Benet, Jujubee, and Thorgy Thor, four drag queens who are all RuPaul's Drag Race alumnae, helping an engaged woman to plan her upcoming wedding. On January 15, 2020, TLC announced that it had given a full season run to Dragnificent!, a new show to be based on the Drag Me Down the Aisle special. The series premiered on April 19, 2020.

== Premise ==
The series follows the Dragnificent team as they transform women into their best, most beautiful and confident selves for the biggest days of their lives.

== Cast ==
- Alexis Michelle, make up and body image
- BeBe Zahara Benet, event planner
- Jujubee, fashion
- Thorgy Thor, music and entertainment

== Episodes ==
=== Special (2019) ===
No.	Title	Original release date	U.S. viewers (millions)
–	"Drag Me Down the Aisle"	March 9, 2019	0.73

=== Season 1 (2020) ===
No.	Title	Original release date	U.S. viewers (millions)
1	"One Tough Bride"	April 19, 2020	0.86
2	"Not Your Typical High-School Reunion"	April 20, 2020	0.83
3	"Fly Butterfly, Fly"	April 27, 2020	0.85
4	"You Have the Right to Remain Sassy"	May 4, 2020	0.82
5	"Pretty in Pink"	May 11, 2020	0.73
6	"Mermaid Fantasy"	May 18, 2020	0.93

== Awards and nominations ==
Year	Awarding Body	Category	Result	Ref.
2021	American Reality Television Awards	Lifestyle Show	Won	
2021	American Reality Television Awards	Feel Good Show	Nominated	
