= BeBe Zahara Benet =

Cameroonian entertainer (born 1981)

Bebe Zahara Benet
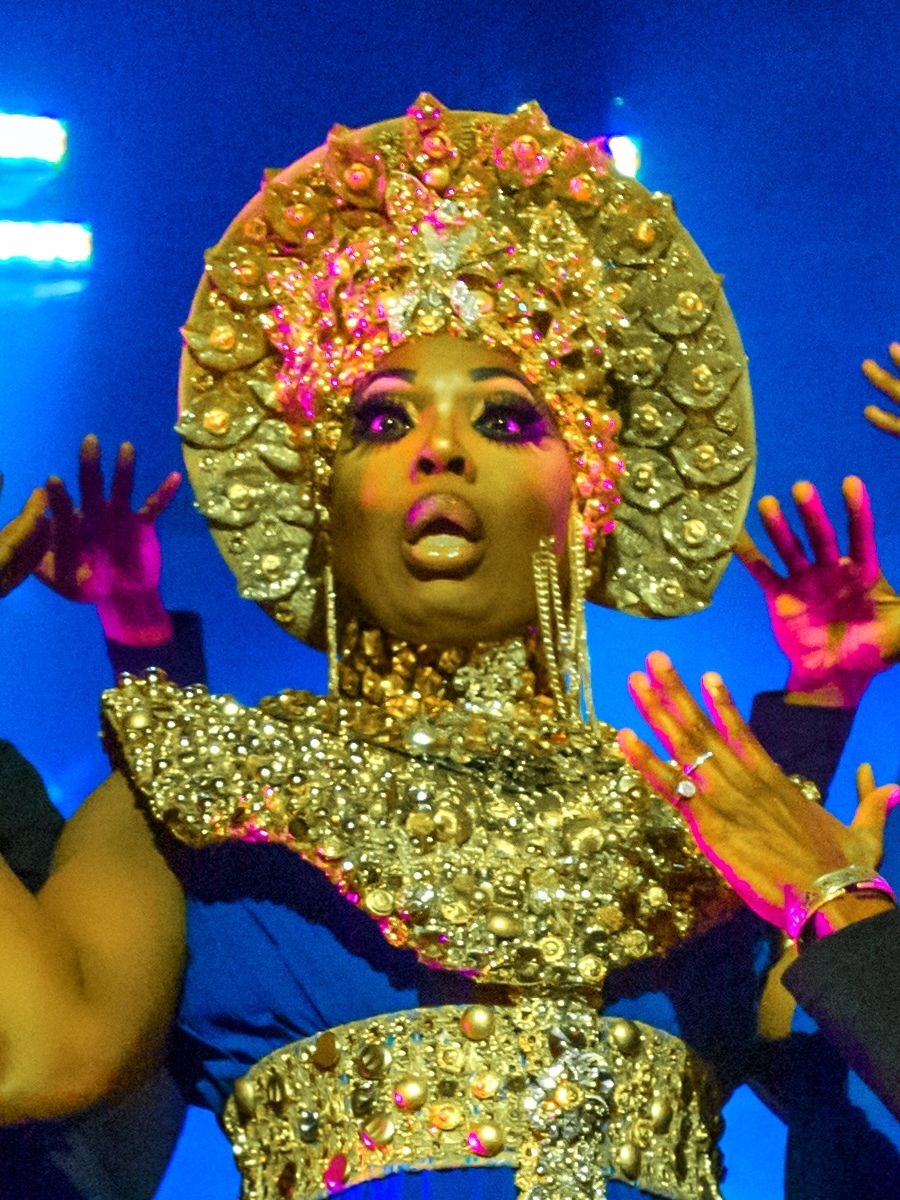
- Benet at NUBIA NYC in 2020
- Born: Nea Marshall Kudi Ngwa; March 20, 1981 (age 45); Douala, Cameroon
- Occupations: Drag queen; television personality; singer; event planner
- Years active: c. 2001–present
- Known for: RuPaul's Drag Race (season 1) winner and RuPaul's Drag Race: All Stars contestant
- Website: bebezaharabenet.net

Nea Marshall Kudi Ngwa (born March 20, 1980), better known by his stage name BeBe Zahara Benet, is a Cameroonian drag performer, television personality, and musician best known for winning the first season of the reality-television drag competition RuPaul's Drag Race in 2009. In 2018, he returned as a contestant for the third season of RuPaul's Drag Race: All Stars, placing in the top four.

His first EP, Face, was released in 2014, followed by his second EP, Kisses & Feathers, in 2017. His third EP, Broken English, was released in 2020. From 2019 to 2020, he starred in the TLC transformational makeover television series Dragnificent, as the event planning expert. In 2021, Being Bebe, a film documenting 15 years of his life, was released.

== Early life ==
Ngwa was born and raised in Cameroon. While growing up, his father played the guitar and his mother frequently sang, later inspiring him to create music. His family later moved to France where Ngwa lived until he settled in Minneapolis at age 19 to complete his college studies and to be closer to family.

== Career ==
Benet's first experience with drag was at a Paris fashion show, where he was asked to put on a dress to walk the runway as a female as a last-minute replacement for an absent model. His first drag performance was alongside Cyndi Lauper in The Gay 90s bar after moving to Minneapolis in 2000. He has participated in drag pageants, including Miss US of A.

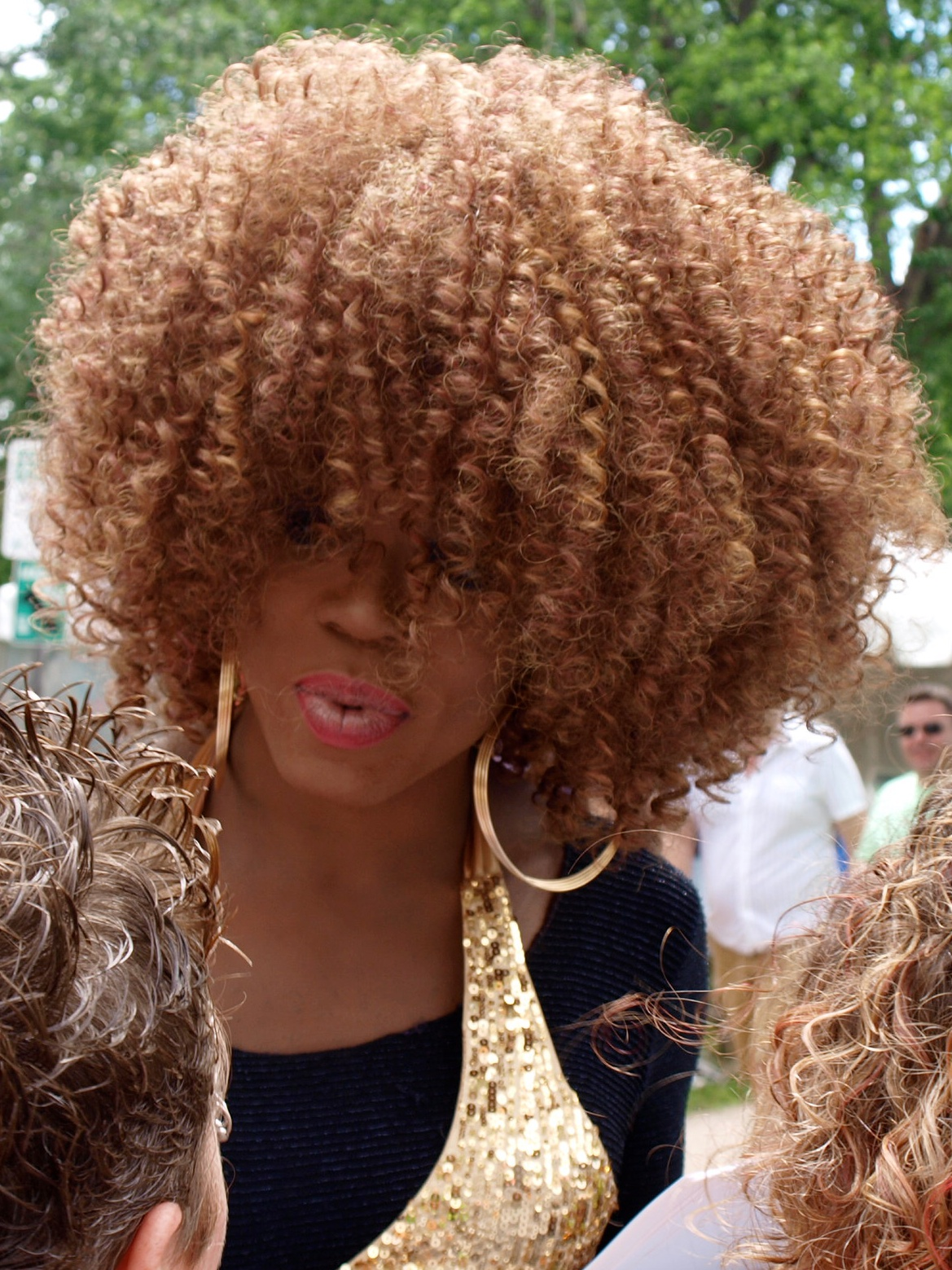
Benet at Twin Cities Pride in 2009

=== RuPaul's Drag Race and other television ===
In early 2009, after a suggestion from RuPaul himself after seeing him perform to "Circle of Life" at Minneapolis Pride, and encouragement from Chi Chi LaRue, Ngwa auditioned for the first season of Logo's reality-TV drag-queen competition RuPaul's Drag Race.

He eventually became one of nine queens cast in the season, having been selected out of thousands of applicants. He was the inaugural winner of the series, having won two challenges during the competition. Bebe's win would inspire many soon-to-be drag queens to pursue the art of drag, including eventual Drag Race season 8 winner Bob The Drag Queen.

A lot of drag artists do exactly what — or even more than what — mainstream artists do. What we do in terms of our transformation, our music, our comedy, it's just legit artistry

— Ngwa, in a 2018 interview

In 2011, Benet appeared in two episodes of RuPaul's Drag U, serving as a "drag professor".

Benet was revealed as the surprise 10th contestant on the third season premiere of RuPaul's Drag Race: All Stars, becoming the first-ever winner in the show's history to return for an All-Stars season. He reached the season finale, having won two challenges, but was not chosen to advance to the final two by a jury of previously eliminated queens and subsequently finished in joint third place with Shangela.

Benet appeared with Jujubee, Thorgy Thor, and Alexis Michelle in the TLC television special Drag Me Down the Aisle which aired on March 9, 2019, and was later picked up as a series and re-titled Dragnificent.

=== Music ===
Benet's first dance single, "I'm the Sh*t", has been remixed by Felix Baumgartner, Ralphi Rosario and Mark Picchiotti. He released his second single, "Cameroon" in July 2010. Benet made a cameo appearance in the music video for Erasure's re-release of their song A Little Respect, in December 2010 (which was a fundraiser for students of the Harvey Milk Institute in San Francisco). He released his third single "Dirty Drums" on April 17, 2012 via iTunes. His fourth single, "Face," was released on March 3, 2014.

Benet recorded a cover of "Little Drummer Boy" for the Drag Race Christmas Queens 4 album.

=== Other ventures and tours ===
In November 2017, Ngwa was a featured performer in Queens United, a benefit show created by Phi Phi O'Hara in an effort to raise money to people affected by Hurricane Maria. In 2018, Ngwa created "Roar", a monthly show featuring interacting dancing.

In 2020, he co-created, produced, and headlined the Nubia tour, a live Drag Show celebrating Black drag queens through original music, group choreography, video installations, live vocals, lip syncs, and narrative-driven performance art. On opening night, Vulture.com praised the cast, RuPaul’s Drag Race alum; Bob The Drag Queen, Peppermint, Shea Couleé, The Vixen, and Monique Heart, noting the “touching sincerity” and “joyous” celebration of black culture featured in the show.

The tour began its run with sold-out shows in New York City, and has plans to visit Los Angeles, as well as other major cities across the United States.

In June 2021, Ngwa was featured in "Gospel Brunch Drag Show", an "LGBTQIA+ Youths Of Color Celebrate Black Pride" event, and the virtual "Pride Bigger Than Texas" event livestreamed from the Bonham Exchange. In August 2021, he was a featured performer and in Klub Kids London Presents: NOIR: The Tour, where 25% of the proceeds from the production was donated to the Black Lives Matter movement.

A documentary film titled Being Bebe premiered at the 2021 Tribeca Film Festival from June 19–23, 2021, and later screened at the Provincetown International Film Festival on June 23, 2021, and screened for three days. The film documented the past fifteen years of Ngwa's life as Bebe Zahara Benet, including his journey preparing for RuPaul's Drag Race. The film won the 2021 Best Documentary Award at the Provincetown International Film Festival.

Outside of drag, Ngwa is the CEO of The Lavish Labs, an event planning and decor firm.

== Personal life ==
Prior to starting drag, he was a choir director and music teacher. He doesn't consider himself a drag queen, and prefers to be called a "drag artist" or "drag performer". Ngwa is a devout Christian.

He has named Christian Dior, Giorgio Armani, and Alphadi as personal fashion icons. Musically, he has named Yvonne Chaka Chaka as his childhood music icon, and Tiwa Savage, Yemi Alade, Angélique Kidjo, and Davido as musicians he'd like to collaborate with.

Ngwa does not define his sexual orientation and accepts all pronouns. (Note: For clarity, accessibility, and consistency, this article uses he/him pronouns for Ngwa throughout.)

== Filmography ==
=== Film ===
Year	Title	Role	Notes	Ref(s)
2020	Nubia: Amplified	Himself	OutTV original	
2021	Being Bebe	Himself	Documentary about Bebe's life	

=== Television ===
Year	Title	Role	Notes	Ref(s)
2009	RuPaul's Drag Race	Himself	Contestant (Winner)	
2011	RuPaul's Drag U	Himself		
2018	RuPaul's Drag Race: All Stars	Himself	Contestant (3rd/4th place)	
2019	Vice Live	Himself	Guest	
2019–2020	Dragnificent	Himself	Also known as Drag Me Down the Aisle	
2019	The Rachel Ray Show	Himself	Guest	
2020	Infinity Train	Sashay	Episode: "The Parasite Car"	
2022	Nubia Amplified: The Series	Himself	Panelist	
2023	Drag Me to Dinner	Himself	Hulu original reality series	

=== Web series ===
Year	Title	Role	Notes	Ref.
2014	WOW Shopping Network	Himself	Guest	
2014	Transformations	Himself	Guest	
2015	Drag Queens React	Himself	Guest	
2018	Whatcha Packin'	Himself	Guest	
2018	Hey Qween!	Himself	Guest	
2019	Follow Me	Himself	Episode: "Pangina Heals"	
2020	Bobbin' Around	Himself	Episode: "Nubia"	
2020	Binge	Himself	Podcast by Entertainment Weekly	
2021	Jack Daniel's Tennessee Fire presents Drag Queen Summer Glamp	Himself	Produced by Jack Daniel's	

=== Music videos ===
Year	Title	Artist	Ref.
2009	"Cover Girl"	RuPaul ft. Bebe Zahara Benet	
2009	"I'm The Shit"	Himself	
2010	"A Little Respect" (HMI Redux)	Erasure	
2010	"Cameroon"	Himself	
2014	"Face"	Himself	
2017	"Fun Tonite"	Himself	
2018	"Jungle Kitty"	Himself	
2018	"Jolene"	Dolly Parton	
2018	"Little Drummer Boy"	Himself	
2020	"Banjo"	Himself	
2020	"Body on Me"	Himself	

== Discography ==
=== Albums ===
==== Comedy albums ====
Title	Details
Africa Is Not a Country	Released: May 5, 2023; Label: Comedy Dynamics; Formats: Digital download, streaming

=== Extended plays ===
Title	Details
Face	Release date: 2014; Label: Dakarai Morris-James/Marshall Ngwa; Formats: Digital download
Kisses & Feathers	Release date: November 17, 2017; Label: Savannah Street Music; Formats: Digital download
Broken English	Release date: April 23, 2020; Label: Producer Entertainment Group; Formats: Digital download
The Christmas Chanteuse	Release date: December 10, 2021; Label: Producer Entertainment Group; Formats: Digital download

=== Singles ===
==== As lead artist ====
Title	Year	Album	Ref(s)
"I'm the Shit"	2009	Non-album single	
"Cameroon"	2010	Non-album single	
"Dirty Drums"	2012	Non-album single	
"Face"	2014	Non-album single	
"Get Fierce (Lose Yourself)"	2017	Kisses & Feathers	
"Fun Tonite"	2017	Kisses & Feathers	
"Starting a Fire"	2017	Kisses & Feathers	
"Dirty Drums/Cameroon" (All Stars Mix)	2018	Non-album single	
"Jungle Kitty"	2018	Non-album single	
"Banjo"	2020	Broken English	
"Fever"	2021	Non-album single	
"Waiting"	2022	Non-album single	
"Smoke Signals"	2022	Non-album single	
"Pull Over"	2023	Non-album single	
"Heavy"	2023	Non-album single	
"Try"	2023	Non-album single	

==== As featured artist ====
Title	Year	Other artist(s)	Peak chart positions	Album
Title	Year	Other artist(s)	US Elec.	Album
"Drag Up Your Life"	2018	RuPaul, Trixie Mattel, Kennedy Davenport, Shangela, BenDeLaCreme	—	Non-album single
"Kitty Girl"	2018	RuPaul, Trixie Mattel, Kennedy Davenport, Shangela	18	Non-album single
"Winner Winner (Chicken Dinner Remix)"	2021	Yvie Oddly, Brad Kemp, Shea Couleé	—	Non-album single

=== Guest appearances ===
Title	Year	Album
"Cover Girl" (RuPaul featuring BeBe Zahara Benet)	2011	Jealous of My Boogie - The RuMixes
"Little Drummer Boy"	2018	Christmas Queens 4

== Notes ==
Awards and achievements
Preceded by Inaugural	Winner of RuPaul's Drag Race; US season 1	Succeeded by Tyra Sanchez
