= Betta Naan Stop =

Indian Drag Queen

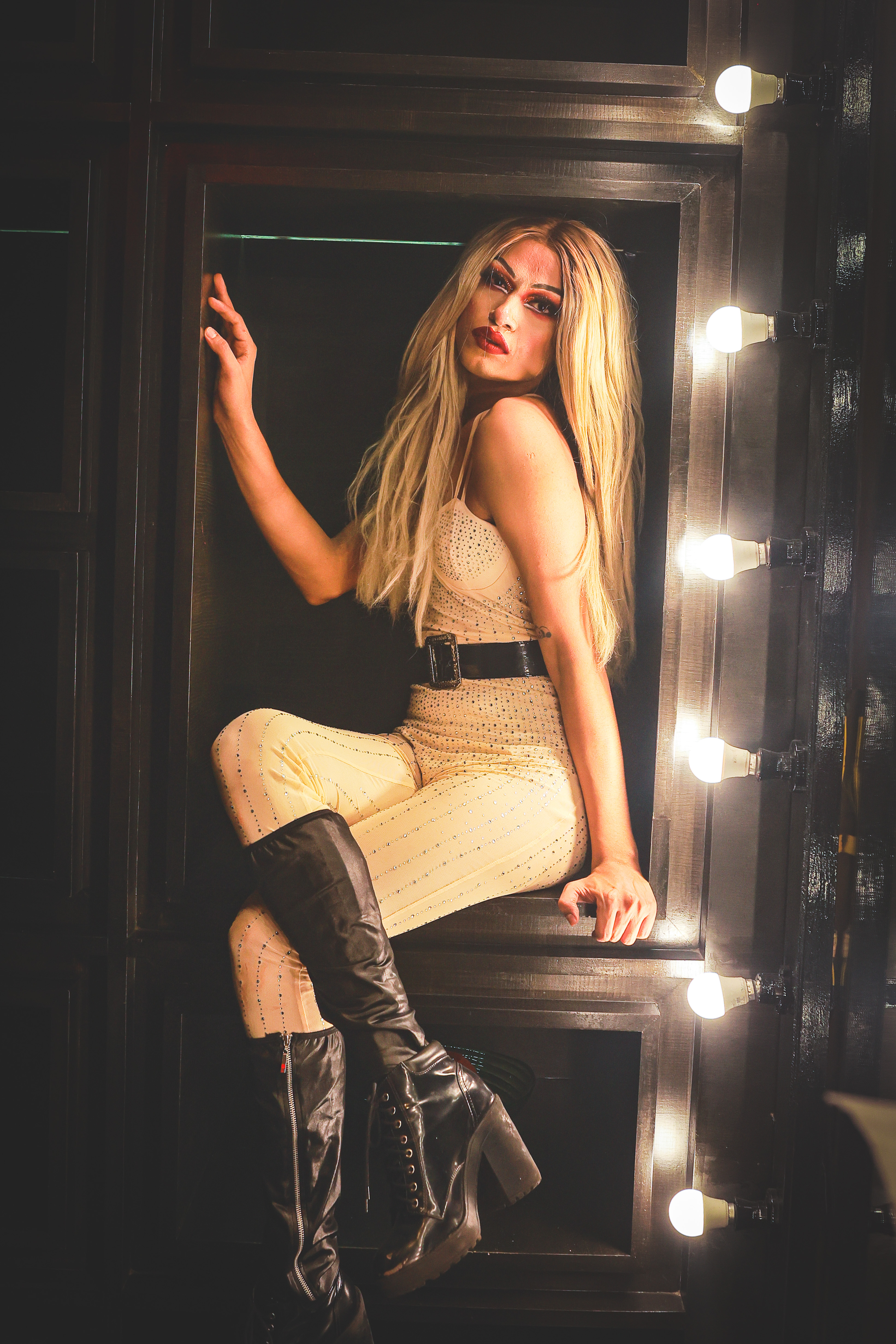
- Born: Prateek Sachdeva; April 9, 1993 (age 32); Delhi, India
- Known for: Drag queen, Model, Dancer

Prateek Sachdeva, better known as Betta Naan Stop, is an Indian drag queen, model, and dancer from India. Betta is the mainstream drag artist in the Indian LGBT Community. Prateek is one of the headliner performers at Lalit Group's Queer nightlife club chain, Kittysu.

== Biography ==
Prateek started his career as a dancer with Ashley Lobo’s DanceWorx. He got a scholarship in Melbourne, and he was trained further in musical theater before returning home to Delhi. When Violet Chachki performed at Kitty Su Delhi’s sixth anniversary, Prateek decided to attend in drag. That's when he realized he wanted to be a drag queen. Sachdeva started working on and experimenting more with drag after a series of make-up sessions with his flight-attendant sister and after watching Paris Is Burning and several seasons of RuPaul's Drag Race. His first performance was as part of a sex-education workshop at St. Columbus School in the capital. It wasn’t planned, but soon he was up on stage breaking out his best moves.

In one of the interviews, Prateek said "I think anyone who has any kind of following and influence should use their platforms for betterment of the society. Sometimes you being your authentic self is a big move in itself!". In case, there is someone who wants to be like you, can see for themselves your journey and your achievements, your challenges and tribulations.

In 2023, Betta Naan Stop was featured as a Judge in a reality show Make Me Up Season 1. Prateek has also been listed under Forbes 30 under 30, one of the only drag queens to make it to the list after Sushant Divgikar in 2020.
