= Alexis Michelle =

American drag performer

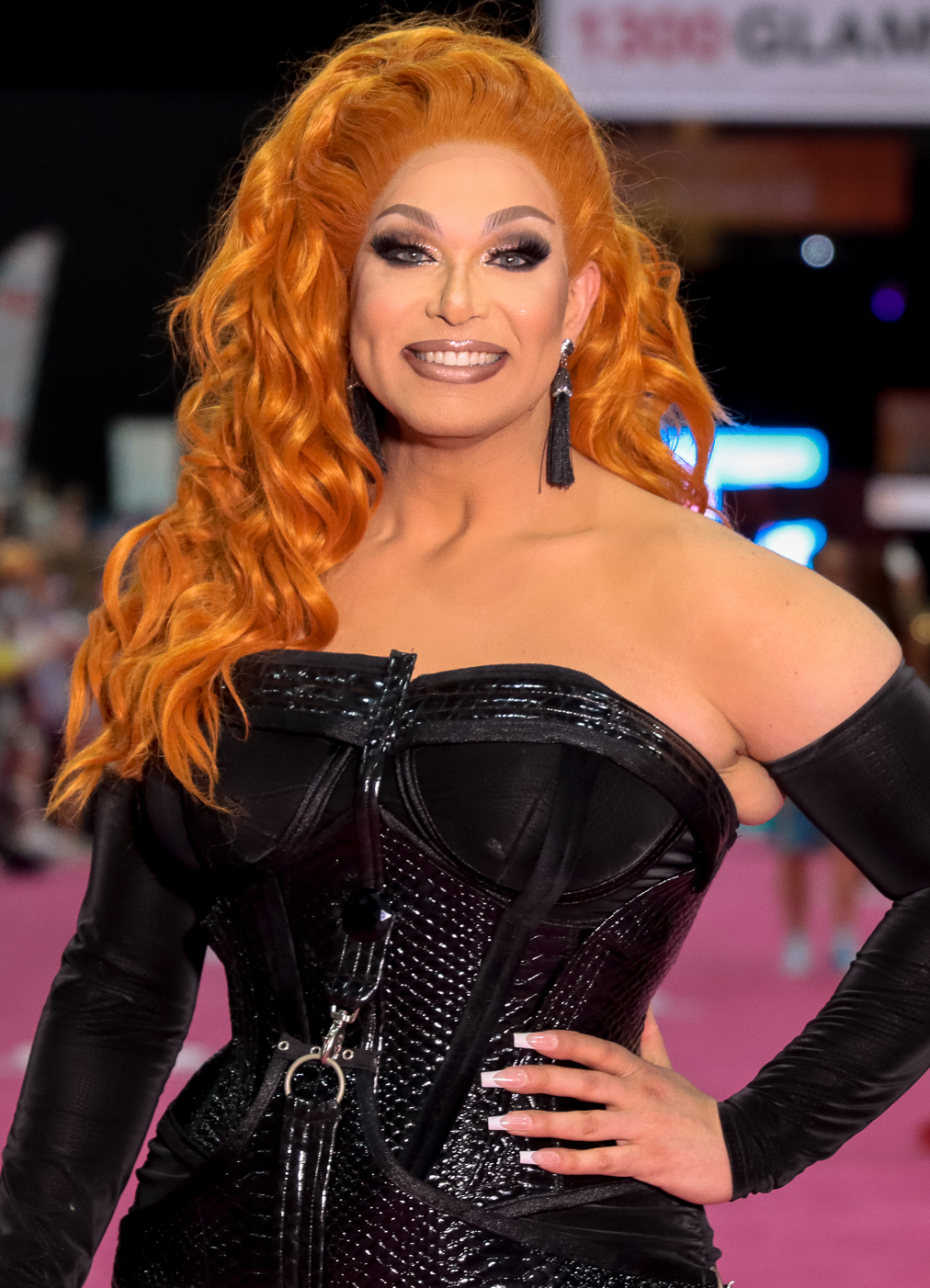
- Michelle at RuPaul's DragCon LA, 2023
- Born: Alexander J. Michaels; October 16, 1983 (age 43); SoHo, Manhattan, New York, U.S.
- Education: University of Michigan (BFA)
- Occupations: Drag queen, singer
- Years active: 2003–present
- Television: RuPaul's Drag Race (season 9) RuPaul's Drag Race All Stars (season 8)
- Relatives: Lisa Loeb (cousin)

Alexander J. Michaels (born October 16, 1983), stage name Alexis Michelle, is an American drag queen and singer who came to international attention on the ninth season of RuPaul's Drag Race. As of 2019, she stars in the TLC transformational makeover television series Dragnificent as the makeup and body image expert. She released her debut album, Lovefool, in 2018.

== Early life ==
Michaels was raised in SoHo, New York and on Long Island, New York. He went to the Little Red School in NYC. His cousin is singer-songwriter Lisa Loeb, and he is of Romanian-Jewish descent. After high school, he attended the Interlochen Center for the Arts in Green Lake Township, Michigan. He later received a BFA in musical theatre from the University of Michigan, Ann Arbor.

Michaels began doing drag when he was 10 years old, and began booking paid, professional gigs in 2003, by the time he was 20 years old. He was mentored by the same drag mother as season 10 contestant Dusty Ray Bottoms, and was seen wearing a "Dusty" T-shirt in the workroom during an episode of season nine. Later, on season ten, Dusty Ray Bottoms could be seen wearing an "Alexis" T-shirt. Michaels auditioned for RuPaul's Drag Race eight times, beginning with the show's earliest seasons, before being selected for season nine.

== Career ==
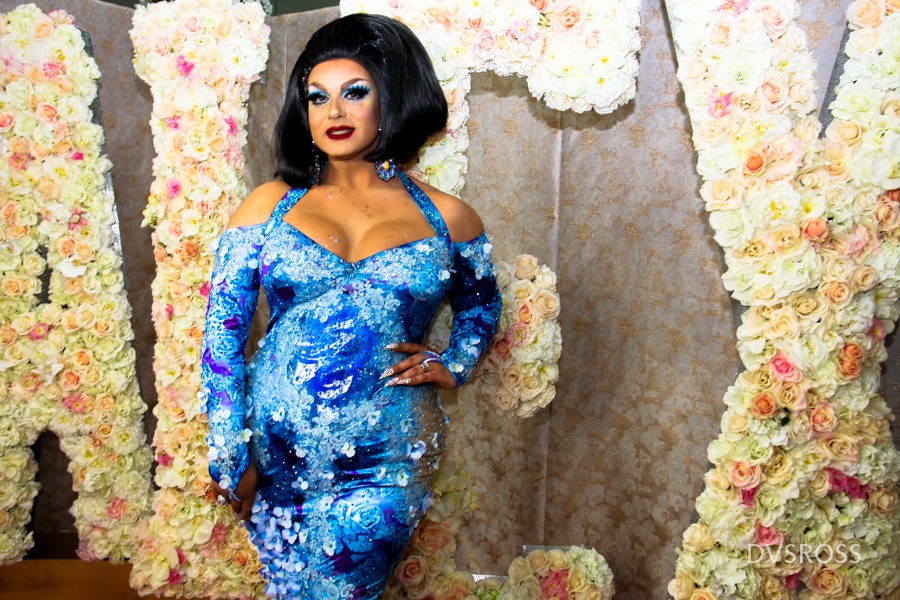
Alexis Michelle at RuPaul's DragCon LA in 2018

As Alexis Michelle, Michaels originated a role in the one-act campy comedy show Rags to B***hes: A Battle of Wits & Wigs. Michelle was announced as one of the fourteen contestants selected to compete on the ninth season of RuPaul's Drag Race on February 2, 2017. She was the winner of the celebrity impersonation and improv challenge, "Snatch Game" (based on classic game shows Hollywood Squares and Match Game), in which she portrayed actress Liza Minnelli. Two episodes later, she was in the bottom-two for her performance in the comedy roast challenge, but ultimately sent-home Farrah Moan to a lip sync-battle of Dolly Parton's "Baby I'm Burning". In episode eleven, she was in the bottom, again, with Peppermint; Michelle lost the lip sync to Peppermint, performing to the Village People's "Macho Man". This ultimately put Michelle in fifth place for her season.

Michelle still frequently performs at the Feinstein/54 Below cabaret with her show about Broadway, Alexis, I Am!. She also appeared with fellow Drag Race alumni BeBe Zahara Benet, Jujubee and Thorgy Thor in the TLC show Drag Me Down the Aisle which aired on March 9, 2019. The special was subsequently given a full series-order under the new name Dragnificent! which premiered in April 2020. In 2023, she was chosen to return and compete on the eighth season of RuPaul's Drag Race All Stars, in which she placed fourth overall.

In 2024, Michelle performed the role of Albin in the Barrington Stage Company production of La Cage aux Folles.

Michelle is the drag-mother of Jan Sport, who placed eighth on the twelfth season (2020) of Drag Race. The next year, Jan returned for the sixth season (2021) of All Stars, placing seventh overall.

== Music ==
Michelle teamed with Sasha Velour, Aja and Peppermint for the single "C.L.A.T." in April 2017.

Michelle released her ten-track debut album, Lovefool, on May 11, 2018. A music video for the single of the same name, a cover of the 1996 song by The Cardigans, was available on May 17, 2018.

== Filmography ==
=== Theatre ===
Year	Production	Role	Venue	Ref(s)
2024	La Cage aux Folles	Albin	Barrington Stage Company	

=== Television ===
Year	Title	Role	Notes	Ref
2017	RuPaul's Drag Race	Herself (contestant)	Season 9, 5th place	
2017	RuPaul's Drag Race: Untucked	Herself (contestant)	Season 9	
2019–20	Dragnificent!	Herself	Also known as Drag Me Down the Aisle	
2019	The Rachael Ray Show	Herself	Guest	
2020	Hot Ones: The Game Show	Herself	Contestant	
2021	Blue Bloods	Oscar/Bartender	Episode: "Guardian Angels"	
2023	RuPaul's Drag Race All Stars	Herself (contestant)	Season 8, 4th place	
2023	RuPaul's Drag Race All Stars: Untucked	Herself	Season 8	
2023	Watch What Happens Live with Andy Cohen	Herself	Guest	

=== Web series ===
Year	Title	Role	Notes	Ref.
2017	Drag Queen Carpool	Herself	Guest, hosted by RuPaul	
2017	Drag Makeup Tutorial	Herself	Guest	
2017	Whatcha Packin'	Herself	Guest, hosted by Michelle Visage	
2017	COSMO Queens	Herself	Guest	
2017	Queen To Queen	Herself	Guest, with Charlie Hides	
2017	How To Makeup	Herself	Guest	
2018	Hey Qween	Herself	Guest	
2018	Transformations	Herself	Guest; Episode: "Alexis Michelle"	
2018	Out of the Closet	Herself	Guest, Episode 4	
2018	The Pit Stop	Herself	Guest, Episode: "The B*tchlor"	
2019	Bootleg Opinions	Herself	Guest; Hosted by Yuhua Hamasaki	
2020	The Pit Stop	Herself	Guest	
2023	Meet the Queens	Herself	Stand-alone special RuPaul's Drag Race All Stars 8	
2023	EW News Flash	Herself	Guest	
2023	BuzzFeed Celeb	Herself	Guest	
2023	React to TikTok Trends by Allure	Herself	Guest	

=== Music videos ===
Year	Title	Artist	Ref
2017	"Too Funky"	Peppermint featuring Ari Gold	
2018	"LOVEFOOL"	Alexis Michelle	
2019	"Rocking Around The Hanukkah Bush"	Alexis Michelle	

== Discography ==
=== Albums ===
Year	Title
2018	Lovefool

=== Singles ===
Year	Title
2017	C.L.A.T. (featuring Sasha Velour, Aja and Peppermint)
2018	Lovefool

==== As featured artist ====
Year	Title
2023	"Money, Success, Fame, Glamour" (Glam Rock version) (with the cast of RuPaul's Drag Race All Stars, season 8)
2023	"Joan! The Unauthorized Rusical" (with the cast of RuPaul's Drag Race All Stars, season 8)

== See also ==
- Drag culture in New York City
- LGBTQ culture in New York City
- List of LGBTQ people from New York City
- NYC Drag March
- NYC Pride March
- Transgender culture in New York City
