= Khookha McQueer =

Tunisian LGBTIQ+ and feminist activist

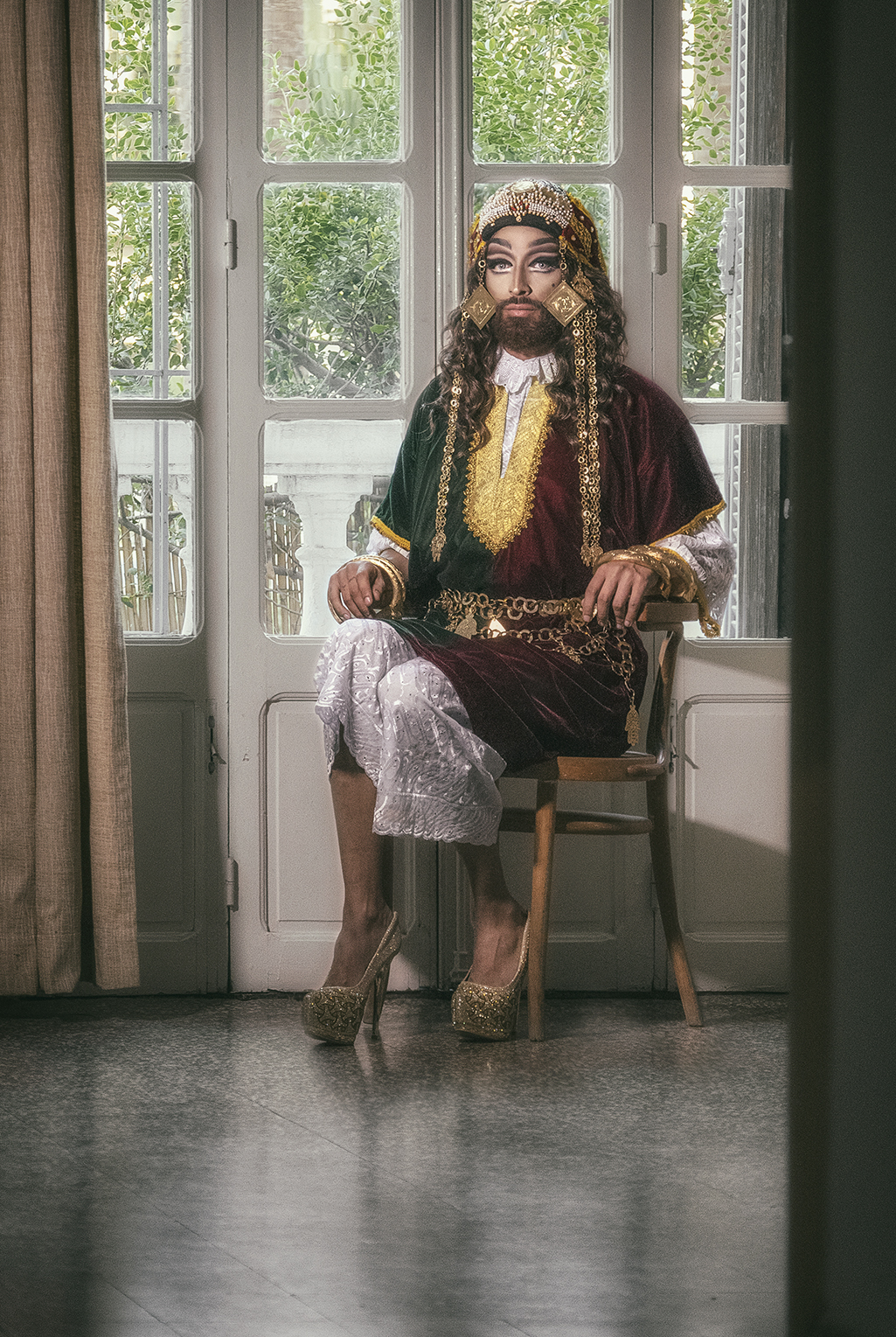
- Born: March 17, 1987 (age 39); Tunisia
- Occupations: Activist, artist

Khookha McQueer (Arabic: خوخة مكوير; born 17 March 1987) is a Tunisian, LGBT+ and feminist activist and artist.

They are one of the first trans women known to the general public in Tunisia.

== Biography ==
Khookha comes from a conservative Tunisian family. After going through a severe depression, they left university and started their LGBT+ activism. They came out twice: once in regards to their sexual orientation, as a gay man, before having their transition, and the second in 2015 in regards to their identity as a trans non-binary woman; thus starting to use the English pronouns They and Them and the feminine pronouns for French and Arabic, as well as their chosen name, Khookha McQueer. Although they identify as non binary and not as a woman, they still prefer using the feminine pronouns in French and Arabic to express that part of their identity that was oppressed during a large part of their life.

== Artistic work ==
They started their professional career as a graphic designer. All of their work is shared on their official Instagram account. Their works deal with the question of identity and non-binarity. The artist also aims to show the challenges the Tunisian LGBT community face in a normative heterosexual and homophobic society. They accept that we qualify the work they produce as ''drag'', but they consider themselves and their art work as a living experience whose parameter that changes with each product is the gender and its esthetic expression. They get a lot of their artistic inspiration from the Tunisian heritage, but their main muses remain the 1980s and 1990s divas from the Middle-East and Latin America such as Sherihan, Thalía and Nawal Al Zoghbi.

== Activism ==
In collaboration with Damj and Avocats Sans Frontières organisations, Khookha participated in the creation of the first terminology guide on gender adapted to the Tunisian context. It gathers a large number of terms related to sexual orientation, identity and behavior, in the Tunisian dialect and in standard Arabic, including the different interpretations of each word in the local culture and context.

Moreover, the activist wants to change the binary and patriarchal culture at the level of the language within the Tunisian community and the Arabic-speaking one in general, by proposing a sort of an alternative inclusive language that includes both of the female and masculine forms, and which they use in all of their academic publications or on their social media through their columns and feminist narratives. They're known for their publications on the Arabic platform Jeem.

For three years, Khookha was a member of a couple of LGBT+ organisations, like Mawjoudin, as a consultant for the trans members, before resigning. According to them, they were unable to stay with the rest of the community because of their political views that are seen as a bit avant-gardist.

In December 2019, Khookha used art to fight for LGBTQ+ rights.
