= List of RuPaul's Drag Race All Stars episodes =

This article contains a list of RuPaul's Drag Race All Stars episodes. The television series RuPaul's Drag Race All Stars aired its first season in 2012, and it involves drag queens competing against each other in various different circumstances.

== Overview ==
Season	Episodes	Originally released		
Season	Episodes	First released	Last released	Network
1	6	October 22, 2012	November 26, 2012	Logo TV
2	9	August 25, 2016	October 27, 2016	Logo TV
3	8	January 25, 2018	March 15, 2018	VH1
4	10	December 14, 2018	February 15, 2019	VH1
5	8	June 5, 2020	July 24, 2020	VH1
6	12	June 24, 2021	September 2, 2021	Paramount+
7	12	May 20, 2022	July 29, 2022	Paramount+
8	12	May 12, 2023	July 21, 2023	Paramount+
9	12	May 17, 2024	July 26, 2024	Paramount+
10	12	May 9, 2025	July 18, 2025	Paramount+
11	12	May 8, 2026	July 17, 2026	Paramount+

== Episodes ==
=== Season 1 (2012) ===
No. overall	No. in season	Title	Original release date
1	1	"It Takes Two"	October 22, 2012
2	2	"RuPaul's Gaff-In"	October 29, 2012
3	3	"Queens Behaving Badly"	November 5, 2012
4	4	"All Star Girl Groups"	November 12, 2012
5	5	"Dynamic Drag Duos"	November 19, 2012
6	6	"The Grand Finale"	November 26, 2012

=== Season 2 (2016) ===
No. overall	No. in season	Title	Original release date
7	1	"All Star Talent Show Extravaganza"	August 25, 2016
8	2	"All Stars Snatch Game"	September 1, 2016
9	3	"HERstory of the World"	September 8, 2016
10	4	"Drag Movie Shequels"	September 15, 2016
11	5	"Revenge of the Queens"	September 22, 2016
12	6	"Drag Fish Tank"	September 29, 2016
13	7	"Family That Drags Together"	October 6, 2016
14	8	"All Stars Supergroup"	October 13, 2016
15	9	"Reunited"	October 27, 2016

=== Season 3 (2018) ===
No. overall	No. in season	Title	Original release date
16	1	"All-Star Variety Show"	January 25, 2018
17	2	"Divas Lip Sync Live"	February 1, 2018
18	3	"The Bitchelor"	February 8, 2018
19	4	"All Stars Snatch Program"	February 15, 2018
20	5	"Pop Art Ball"	February 22, 2018
21	6	"Handmaids to Kitty Girls"	March 1, 2018
22	7	"My Best Squirrelfriend's Dragsmaids Wedding Trip"	March 8, 2018
23	8	"A Jury of Their Queers"	March 15, 2018

=== Season 4 (2018–19) ===
No. overall	No. in season	Title	Original release date
24	1	"All Star-Spangled Variety Show"	December 14, 2018
25	2	"Super Girl Groups, Henny"	December 21, 2018
26	3	"Snatch Game of Love"	December 28, 2018
27	4	"Jersey Justice"	January 4, 2019
28	5	"Roast in Peace"	January 11, 2019
29	6	"LaLaPaRUza"	January 18, 2019
30	7	"Queens of Clubs"	January 25, 2019
31	8	"RuPaul's Best Judy's Race"	February 1, 2019
32	9	"Sex and the Kitty Girl"	February 8, 2019
33	10	"Super Queen Grand Finale"	February 15, 2019

=== Season 5 (2020) ===
No. overall	No. in season	Title	Original release date
34	1	"All Star Variety Extravaganza"	June 5, 2020
35	2	"I'm in Love!"	June 12, 2020
36	3	"Get a Room!"	June 19, 2020
37	4	"SheMZ"	June 26, 2020
38	5	"Snatch Game of Love"	July 3, 2020
39	6	"The Charles Family Backyard Ball"	July 10, 2020
40	7	"Stand-Up Smackdown"	July 17, 2020
41	8	"Clap Back!"	July 24, 2020

=== Season 6 (2021) ===
No. overall	No. in season	Title	Original release date
42	1	"All Star Variety Extravaganza"	June 24, 2021
43	2	"The Blue Ball"	June 24, 2021
44	3	"Side Hustles"	July 1, 2021
45	4	"Halftime Headliners"	July 8, 2021
46	5	"Pink Table Talk"	July 15, 2021
47	6	"Rumerican Horror Story: Coven Girls"	July 22, 2021
48	7	"Show Up Queen"	July 29, 2021
49	8	"Snatch Game of Love"	August 5, 2021
50	9	"Drag Tots"	August 12, 2021
51	10	"Rudemption Lip-Sync Smackdown"	August 19, 2021
52	11	"The Charisma, Uniqueness, Nerve and Talent Monologues"	August 26, 2021
53	12	"This Is Our Country"	September 2, 2021

=== Season 7 (2022) ===
No. overall	No. in season	Title	Original release date
54	1	"Legends"	May 20, 2022
55	2	"Snatch Game"	May 20, 2022
56	3	"The Realness of Fortune Ball"	May 27, 2022
57	4	"Fairytale Justice"	June 3, 2022
58	5	"Draguation Speeches"	June 10, 2022
59	6	"Total RuQuest Live"	June 17, 2022
60	7	"Legendary Legend Looks"	June 24, 2022
61	8	"Santa's School for Girls"	July 1, 2022
62	9	"Dance Like a Drag Queen"	July 8, 2022
63	10	"The Kennedy Davenport Center Honors Hall of Shade"	July 15, 2022
64	11	"Drag Race Gives Back Variety Extravaganza"	July 22, 2022
65	12	"Lip Sync LaLaPaRuZa Smackdown"	July 29, 2022

=== Season 8 (2023) ===
No. overall	No. in season	Title	Original release date
66	1	"The Fame Games"	May 12, 2023
67	2	"It's RDR Live!"	May 12, 2023
68	3	"The Supermarket Ball"	May 19, 2023
69	4	"Screen Queens"	May 26, 2023
70	5	"Snatch Game of Love"	June 2, 2023
71	6	"Joan: The Unauthorized Rusical"	June 9, 2023
72	7	"Forensic Queens"	June 16, 2023
73	8	"You're a Winner, Baby!"	June 23, 2023
74	9	"Carson Kressley, This Is Your Gay Life!"	June 30, 2023
75	10	"The Letter L"	July 7, 2023
76	11	"The Fame Games Variety Extravaganza"	July 14, 2023
77	12	"Grand Finale"	July 21, 2023

=== Season 9 (2024) ===
No. overall	No. in season	Title	Original release date
78	1	"Drag Queens Save the World"	May 17, 2024
79	2	"The Paint Ball"	May 17, 2024
80	3	"Snatch Game of Love"	May 24, 2024
81	4	"Smokin' Hot Firefighter Makeovers"	May 31, 2024
82	5	"Property Queens"	June 7, 2024
83	6	"The National Drag Convention Roast"	June 14, 2024
84	7	"Meeting in the Ladies Room"	June 21, 2024
85	8	"Make Your Own Kind of Rusic"	June 28, 2024
86	9	"Rosemarie's Baby Shower: The Rusical"	July 5, 2024
87	10	"Lip-Sync LaLaPaRuZa Smackdown"	July 12, 2024
88	11	"Grand Finale Variety Extravaganza: Part 1"	July 19, 2024
89	12	"Grand Finale Variety Extravaganza: Part 2"	July 26, 2024

=== Season 10 (2025) ===
No. overall	No. in season	Title	Original release date
90	1	"Winner Winner, Chicken Dinner"	May 9, 2025
91	2	"Murder on the Dance Floor"	May 9, 2025
92	3	"Hoop Queens Makeovers"	May 16, 2025
93	4	"Eight Ball"	May 23, 2025
94	5	"Rappin' Roast"	May 30, 2025
95	6	"Starrbooty: The Rebooty"	June 6, 2025
96	7	"Wicked Good"	June 13, 2025
97	8	"Stagecooch"	June 20, 2025
98	9	"The Golden Bitchelor"	June 27, 2025
99	10	"Tournament of All Stars Snatch Game"	July 4, 2025
100	11	"Tournament of All Stars Talent Invitational"	July 11, 2025
101	12	"Tournament of All Stars Smackdown for the Crown"	July 18, 2025

=== Season 11 (2026) ===
No. overall	No. in season	Title	Original release date
102	1	"Break Dancin' 2: Electric Rugaloo"	May 8, 2026
103	2	"Bar Queen Couture"	May 8, 2026
104	3	"Shop Til U Drop"	May 15, 2026
105	4	"Duets: It Takes Two"	May 22, 2026
106	5	"How-To Videos"	May 29, 2026
107	6	"Too Many Daddies"	June 5, 2026
108	7	"Athletic Supporter Design Challenge"	June 12, 2026
109	8	"Rappin' Roast Redux"	June 19, 2026
110	9	"That's What She Said"	June 26, 2026
111	10	"Tell Me Something Good"	July 3, 2026
112	11	"Tournament of All Stars Talent Rumble"	July 10, 2026
113	12	"Disco Smackdown for the Crown"	July 17, 2026
