= Handmaids to Kitty Girls =

- RuPaul's Drag Race All Stars episode
- Episode no.: Season 3 Episode 6
- Original air date: March 1, 2018

Guest appearances
- Adam Lambert; Emma Bunton

Episode chronology
← Previous "Pop Art Ball"	Next → "My Best Squirrelfriend's Dragsmaids Wedding Trip"
- RuPaul's Drag Race All Stars season 3

"Handmaids to Kitty Girls" is the sixth episode of the third season of the American reality competition television series RuPaul's Drag Race All Stars, which aired on VH1 on March 1, 2018. The episode features the return of the previously eliminated contestants and a challenge in which the contestants must compose lyrics, choreograph and come up with a distinct character to perform as in a girl group performance. Adam Lambert and Emma Bunton served as guest judges, alongside regular panelists RuPaul, Michelle Visage, and Carson Kressley.

== Episode ==
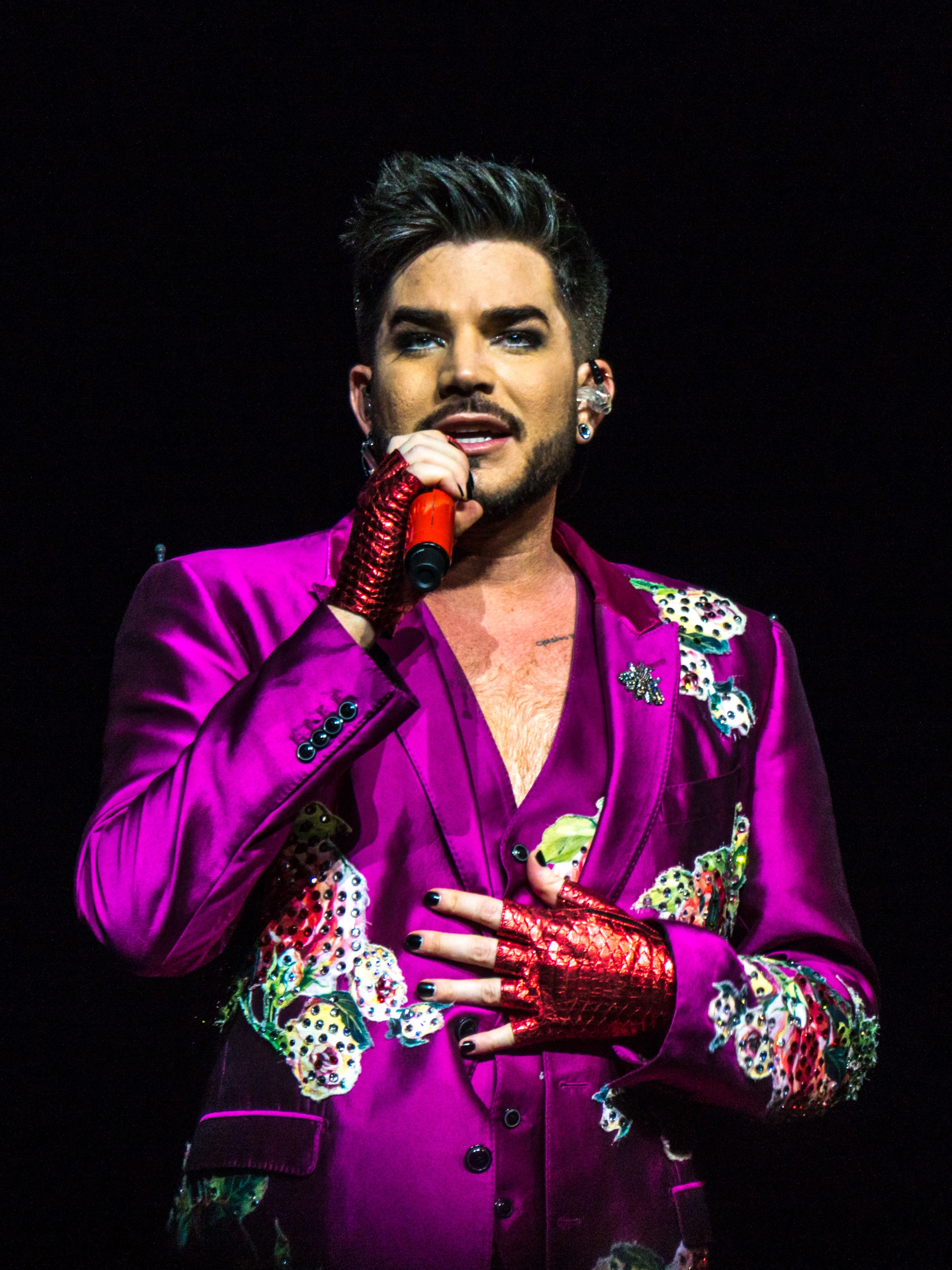
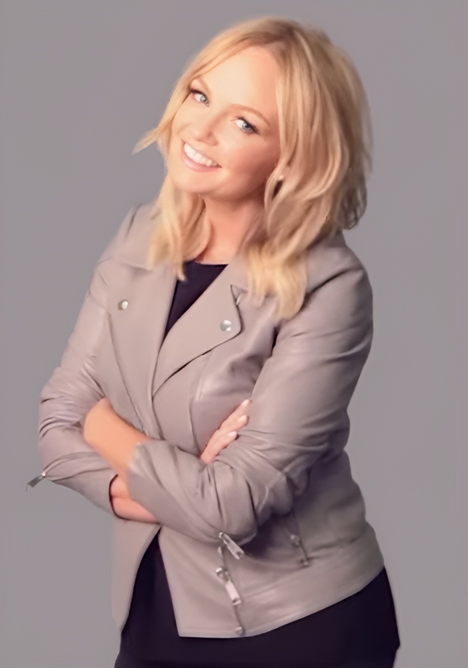
Adam Lambert (left, pictured in 2017) and Emma Bunton (right, pictured in 2014) served as guest judges.

In a skit parodying The Handmaid's Tale, previous All-Stars winners Alaska and Chad Michaels bring the eliminated queens - Morgan McMichaels, Thorgy Thor, Chi Chi DeVayne, Milk, and Aja - back on the runway in front of RuPaul, who tells them the time has come for their revenge.

In the Werk Room, the remaining contestants - BeBe Zahara Benet, Trixie Mattel, Shangela, Kennedy Davenport, and BenDeLaCreme - discuss the elimination of Aja by BeBe Zahara Benet. The next day, RuPaul informs the contestants that they must compose lyrics, choreograph a routine, and come up with a character for his new supergroup The Kitty Girls. He then reveals the eliminated queens will be competing in a group of their own to win their way back into the challenge. RuPaul announces that whichever queen wins the challenge will get to decide which of the remaining contestants will be eliminated and which previously eliminated queen will return. The two groups engage in vocal coaching with Adam Lambert and practice their routines.

While in the Werk Room, the eliminated queens discuss their qualms over their eliminations with the Top 5.

=== Runway ===
RuPaul introduces guest Emma Bunton and the contestants perform their songs, the eliminated queens performing "Sitting on a Secret" and the Top 5 performing "Drag Up Your Life". Upon judgement, the Top 5 are deemed the winning group. BenDeLaCreme and Bebe Zahara Benet are given positive critiques and are deemed the top two, while Kennedy Davenport, Shangela and Trixie Mattel are put up for elimination.

BenDeLaCreme and Bebe Zahara Benet lip sync against each other to "Nobody's Supposed to Be Here (Hex Hector Dance Mix) by Deborah Cox. BenDeLaCreme is named the winner of the lip sync. BenDeLaCreme reveals that she has chosen Morgan McMichaels, whom she had previously eliminated in the first episode of the season, to rejoin the competition. She then announces that she has chosen to eliminate herself from the competition, writing in her own name on her revealed lipstick with Wite-Out.

Group 1: Top 5 "Drag Up Your Life"			Group 2: Eliminated Queens "Sitting on a Secret"		
Queen	Character	Result	Queen	Result	Result
BenDeLaCreme	Goth Kitty	QUIT	Morgan McMichaels	Bimbo Kitty	IN
Bebe Zahara Benet	Jungle Kitty	TOP2	Aja	Lil' Banjee	OUT
Kennedy Davenport	Diva Kitty	BTM	Chi Chi DeVayne	Cajun Kitty	OUT
Shangela	Sparkle Kitty	BTM	Milk	Milky Kitty	OUT
Trixie Mattel	I.Q. Kitty	BTM	Thorgy Thor	Cardio Kitty	OUT

==== Lip Sync ====
Episode	Contestants (Pick for Elimination) [Pick for Return]			Song	Winner	Up For Elimination	Eliminated
6^{[a]}	Bebe Zahara Benet (Trixie Mattel)^{[b]} [Morgan McMichaels]	vs.	BenDeLaCreme (BenDeLaCreme) [Morgan McMichaels]	"Nobody's Supposed to Be Here (Hex Hector Dance Mix)" (Deborah Cox)	BenDeLaCreme	Kennedy Davenport; Shangela; Trixie Mattel	BenDeLaCreme^{[c]}

The contestant chose to eliminate themselves.

Notes

- ^{^[a]} In episode 6, the contestants in the lip sync were asked to choose an eliminated contestant to return to the competition in addition to picking someone to eliminate.
- ^{^[b]} BeBe Zahara Benet chose not to show whom she selected to return to the competition and whom she selected to eliminate if she had won the lip sync. Later on Trinity the Tuck's podcast, on May 3, 2020, Aja asserted that Bebe had chosen Trixie Mattel for elimination.
- ^{^[c]} BenDeLaCreme wrote her own name on a lipstick using whiteout, choosing to quit the competition. After being given the choice by RuPaul to select a queen to return, she chose Morgan McMichaels.

== Reception ==
Oliver Sava of The A.V. Club gave the episode an 'A−' rating, writing that BenDeLaCreme's self-elimination "drops a bomb on this season that completely changes the competition moving forward." The self-elimination was named the most shocking moment on RuPaul's Drag Race in an article by Billboard. Fans of the series gave BenDeLaCreme the nickname BenDeLaChrist in response to her actions in this episode. In an interview with Entertainment Weekly, BenDeLaCreme revealed that she only decided to eliminate herself on that day and had borrowed the Wite-Out from fellow contestant Thorgy Thor.
