= Divas Lip Sync Live =

- RuPaul's Drag Race All Stars episode
- Episode no.: Season 3 Episode 2
- Presented by: RuPaul
- Original air date: February 1, 2018

Guest appearances
- Todrick Hall; Vanessa Williams

Episode chronology
← Previous "All-Star Variety Show"	Next → "The Bitchelor"
- RuPaul's Drag Race All Stars season 3

"Divas Lip Sync Live" is the second episode of the third season of the American reality competition television series RuPaul's Drag Race All Stars, which aired on VH1 on February 1, 2018. The episode has contestants impersonate famous divas and lip-sync to a medley of RuPaul songs. Todrick Hall and Vanessa Williams are guest judges.

BenDeLaCreme and Shangela win the main challenge. Thorgy Thor is eliminated from the competition after placing in the bottom and being voted out by BenDeLaCreme, who wins a lip-sync contest against Shangela to "Jump (For My Love)" by The Pointer Sisters.

== Episode ==
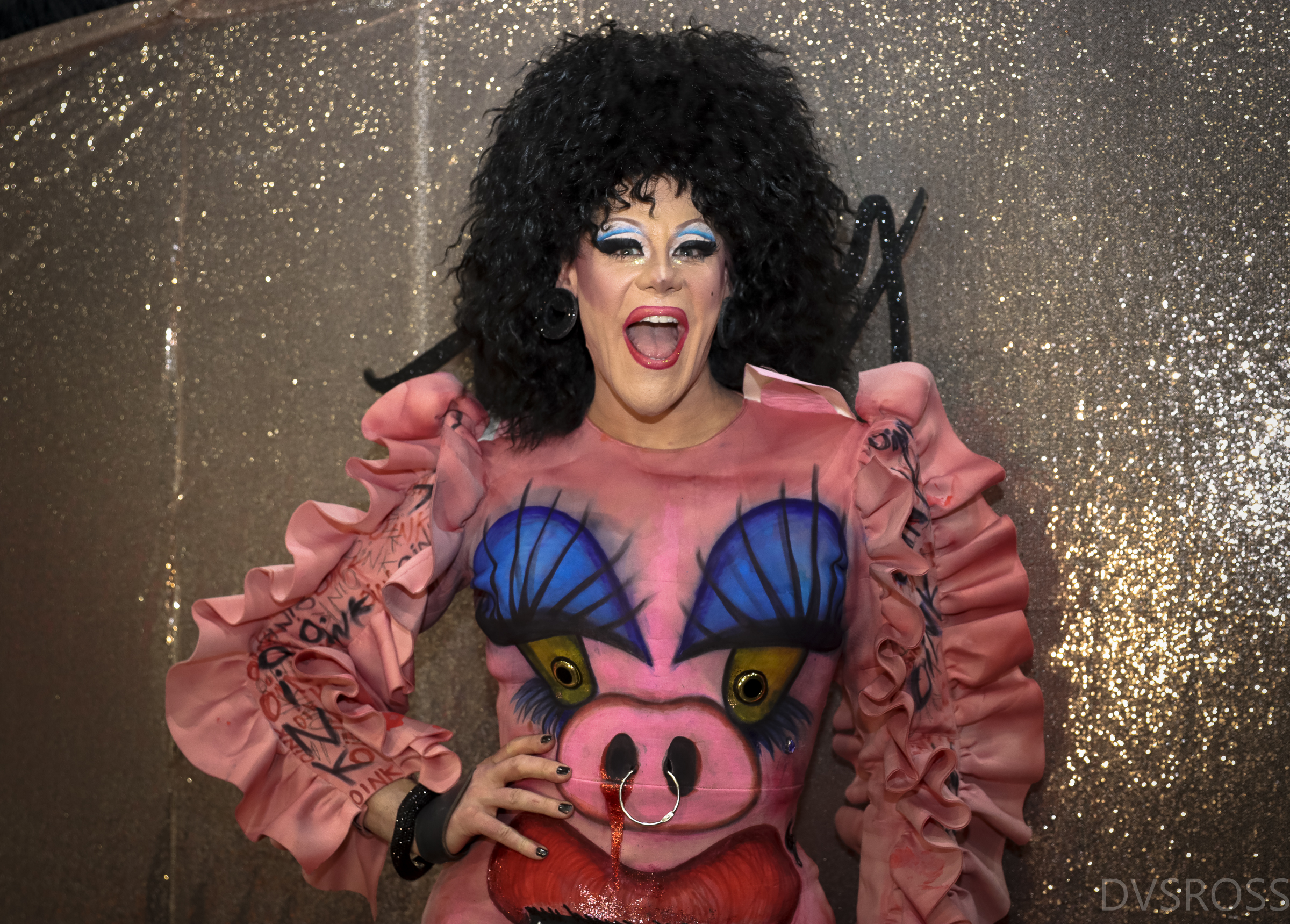
Thorgy Thor (pictured in 2022) is eliminated from the competition by Shangela.

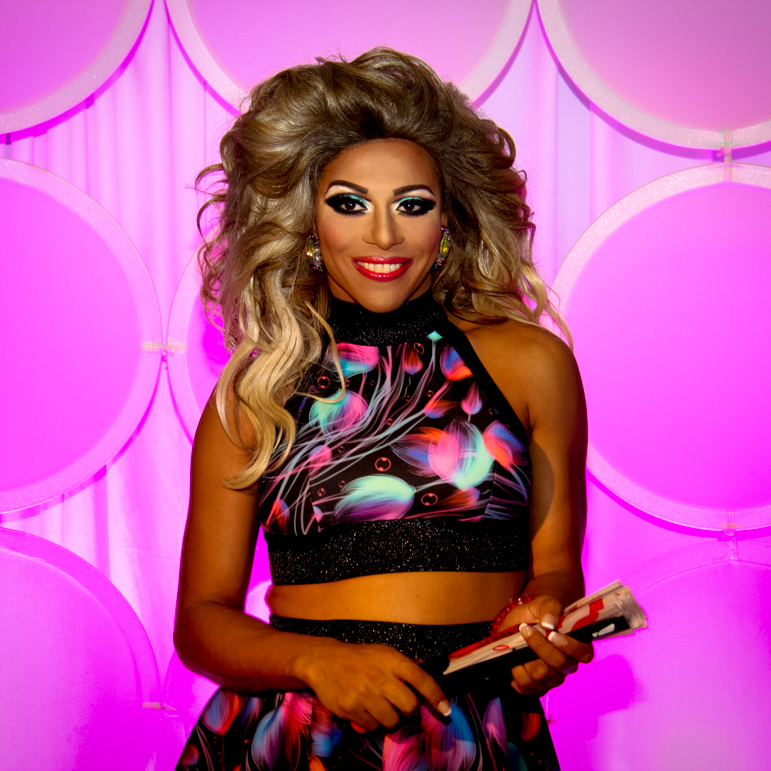
Shangela (pictured in 2017) wins the episode's lip-sync contest.

The nine remaining contestants return to the workroom after Morgan McMichaels's elimination on the previous episode. Aja reveals to the group that she would have eliminated Chi Chi DeVayne from the competition had she won the lip-sync contest. On a new day, the contestants return to the workroom and Chi Chi DeVayne criticizes Milk for her performance. RuPaul greets the group and reveals the main challenge, which tasks the contestants with impersonating VH1 divas in the Divas Lip Sync Live, a tribute act with a medley of RuPaul songs. RuPaul reveals who each contestant will be impersonating:

- Aja as Amy Winehouse
- BeBe Zahara Benet as Diana Ross
- BenDeLaCreme as Julie Andrews
- Chi Chi DeVayne as Patti LaBelle
- Kennedy Davenport as Janet Jackson
- Milk as Celine Dion
- Shangela as Mariah Carey
- Trixie Mattel as Dolly Parton
- Thorgy Thor as Stevie Nicks

Before leaving, RuPaul reveals that the contestants will be rehearsing with Todrick Hall and that Vanessa Williams is the guest judge. RuPaul also shares the runway category for the fashion show: "RuDemption", or a chance to redo an "infamous fashion fail". The contestants listen to the production and discuss their roles, then rehearse with Hall.

On elimination day, the contestants prepare for the performance. On the main stage, RuPaul welcomes fellow judges Michelle Visage and Carson Kressley, as well as guest judges Hall and Williams. RuPaul shares the assignment of the main challenge and the runway category ("RuDemption Runway"), then the performance commences. The contestants present their looks in the fashion show, then the judges deliver their critiques followed by the results. BenDeLaCreme and Shangela place in the top. Kennedy Davenport and Thorgy Thor place in the bottom. The contestants deliberate in the workroom, then BenDeLaCreme and Shangela face off in a lip-sync contest to "Jump (For My Love)" (1984) by The Pointer Sisters. Shangela wins the lip-sync and eliminates Thorgy Thor from the competition. Thorgy Thor returns to the workroom to leave a message on the mirror for the remaining competitors. Thorgy Thor watches a cryptic video message from RuPaul, then Alaska and Chad Michaels appear behind her in the workroom.

== Production and broadcast ==
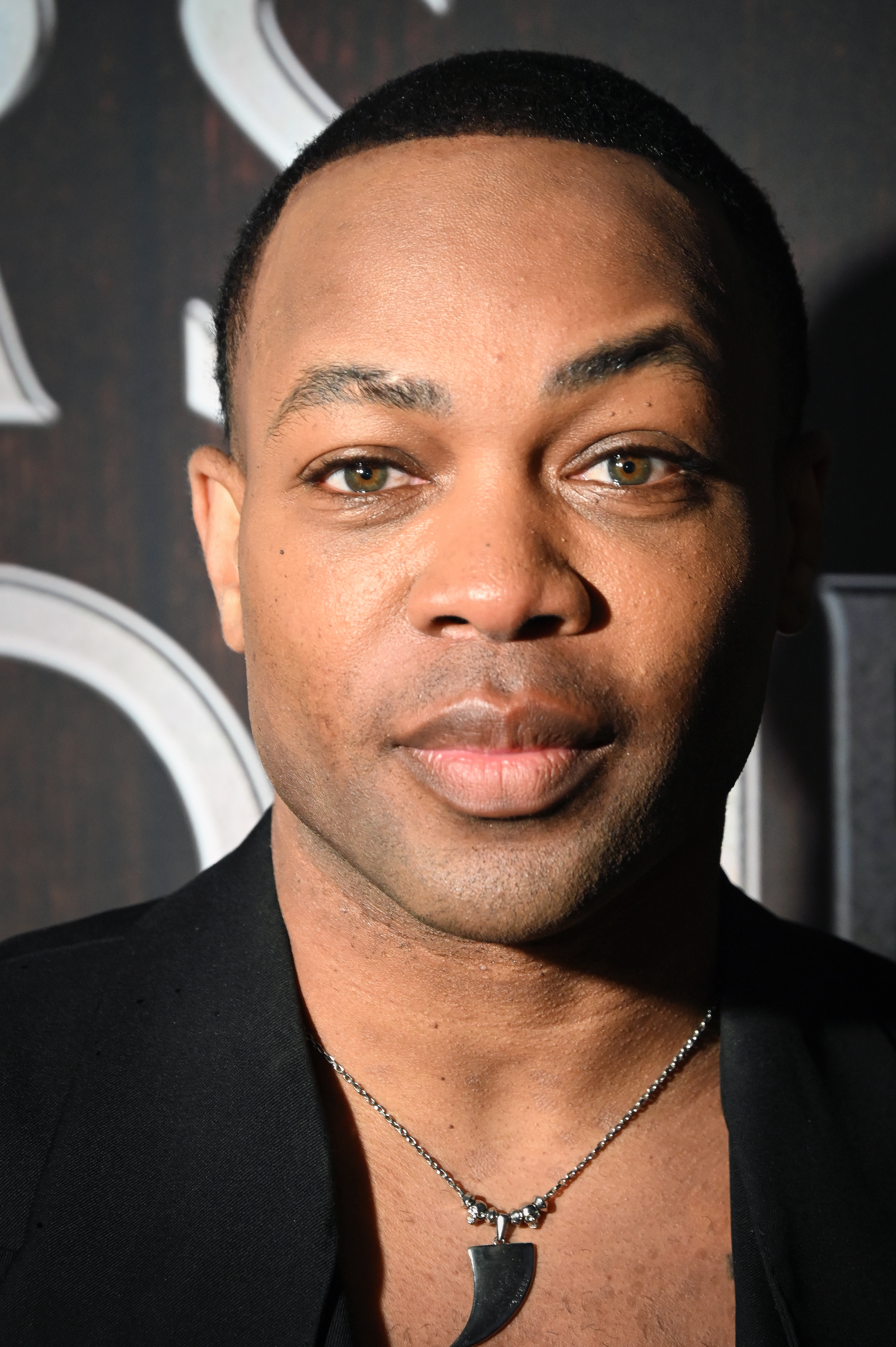
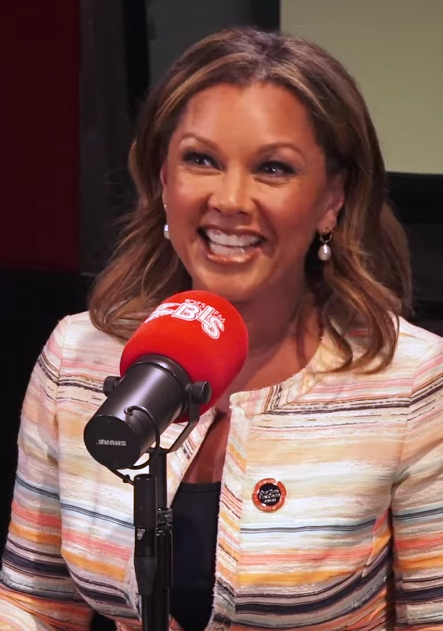
Todrick Hall (top, pictured in 2026) and Vanessa Williams (bottom, pictured in 2019) are guest judges.

The episode originally aired on VH1 on February 1, 2018.

After being eliminated, Thorgy Thor says, "Ugh, Jesus. Gross", which became a meme.

=== Fashion ===
For the workroom, RuPaul wears a pink suit and a light blue dress shirt. For the main stage, RuPaul has a black-and-pink dress.

For the performance, Milk wears a black-and-silver dress, a container of peanut butter attached to her necklace, and a dark wig. Kennedy Davenport has a blue outfit, silver boots, and a long black wig. Aja wears a black dress, matching high-heeled shoes, large hoop earrings, and a dark wig. Chi Chi DeVayne has a short dress with purple sequins and a dark wig. Trixie Mattel wears a sparkly white outfit and a blonde wig. Shangela has a white outfit and a headpiece with butterflies. Thorgy Thor wears a black hat and a blonde wig. BenDeLaCreme has a black-and-blue dress with a short blonde wig. BeBe Zahara Benet wears a red dress with sequins and a dark wig.

The challenge has each contestant recreate a look from their original season. Milk wears a blue dress and a red wig. Aja has a red-and-orange dress, black gloves, and a red wig. Chi Chi DeVayne has a neon yellow dress, a pink boa, and a yellow wig with a matching hat. Trixie Mattel wears a long dress with many bows attached. She also has a blonde wig. Kennedy Davenport removes part of her outfit to reveal a sparkly silver layer and she has a matching wig. Thorgy Thor has a black-and-neon-green dress with a matching headpiece. BenDeLaCreme wears a pink outfit with beads and a matching floral headpiece. BeBe Zahara Benet recreates her season 1 entrance look with a black dress and a dark wig. Shangela walks inside an inflatable bubble in a red-and-white outfit.

== Reception ==
In her 2018 "definitive ranking" of all the RuPaul's Drag Race musicals for In Magazine, Bianca Guzzo ranked the divas tribute number six and wrote, "This was another Rusical that had potential to be great. Our favourite Queens impersonating our favourite divas… Literally nothing could top that. Unfortunately VH1 Diva's [sic] featured some queens having a bit of an advantage over others, which made a lot of Drag Race fans upset." In their review of the episode, Vulture's Bowen Yang and Matt Rogers rated "Divas Lip Sync Live" four out of five stars. The website's Barry Levitt ranked "Divas Lip Sync Live" number 23 in a list of all Rusicals in the Drag Race franchise. Charlie Duncan ranked the production number eight in PinkNews's 2024 list of fourteen Rusicals on Drag Race to date.

== See also ==
- Amy Winehouse in popular culture
- Cultural impact of Celine Dion
- Cultural impact of Mariah Carey
- Dolly Parton as a gay icon
- Janet Jackson as a gay icon
