= Reunited (RuPaul's Drag Race All Stars) =

- RuPaul's Drag Race All Stars episode
- Episode no.: Season 2 Episode 9
- Presented by: RuPaul
- Original air date: October 27, 2016

Episode chronology
← Previous "All Stars Supergroup"	Next → "All-Star Variety Show"
- RuPaul's Drag Race All Stars season 2

"Reunited" is the ninth and final episode of the second season of the American television series RuPaul's Drag Race All Stars. It originally aired on October 27, 2016. The episode sees contestants from the season return for a group discussion with RuPaul.

== Episode ==
The season's contestants return for the reunion, with the exception of Phi Phi O'Hara. Discussions include the Lip-Sync for Your Legacy format, Coco Montrese's health prior to taping, Adore Delano quitting the competition, Tatianna's eliminations, the makeover challenge, Alaska Thunderfuck's tantrum, and the eliminated contestants returning for revenge. The contestants also "toot or boot" (approve or disapprove) of some of the season's runway presentations. RuPaul also shows a clip from one of Alaska's audition tapes for the show. The episode ends with Alaska appearing in the Hall of Fame alongside Chad Michaels.

== Production and broadcast ==
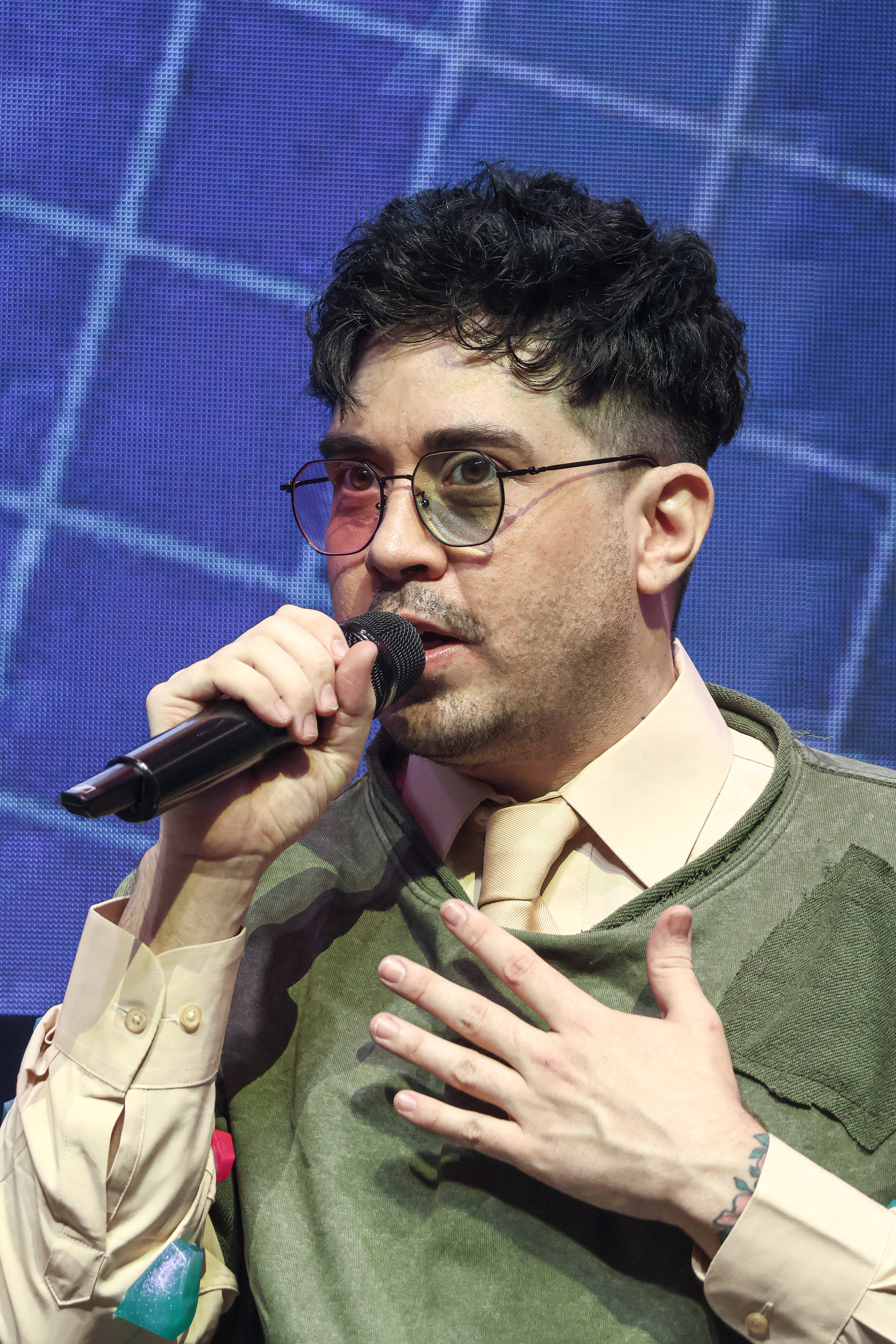
Phi Phi O'Hara chose not to participate in the reunion.

The episode originally aired on October 27, 2016. During the episode, RuPaul shows off an Emmy Award.

While answering one of RuPaul's questions, Alaska throws a prosthetic leg across the stage, referencing a similar action by Aviva Drescher on The Real Housewives of New York City. On Hey Qween!, Katya told Jonny McGovern that her look was inspired by a character from the 1990 film Total Recall.

RuPaul discussed Phi Phi O'Hara's absence from the reunion on Entertainment Tonight.

=== Fashion ===
RuPaul wears a colorful suit with a black dress shirt. Adore Delano has a tan dress, a black collar with a metal ring attached, black fishnet stockings, and a long dark wig. Alaska wears a pink dress with a cockroach pattern, as well as black gloves and a matching collar, a tall blonde wig, and a crown. Alyssa Edwards has a black-and-gold outfit, a blonde wig, and a black headdress with feathers. Coco Montrese wears an orange dress. Detox has a pastel green dress with matching lipstick and a blonde wig. Ginger Minj wears a red dress, matching gloves, a white boa, and a blonde wig. Katya has a black dress with a colorful print, a blonde wig, and prosthetic makeup on her face. Roxxxy Andrews wears a red-and-tan dress, red earrings, and a blonde wig. Tatiana has a light purple dress, large hoop earrings, and a dark wig.

== Reception ==
Writing for Vulture, Joel Kim Booster rated the episode two out of five stars. Oliver Sava of The A.V. Club gave the episode a rating of 'C'.
