= My Best Squirrelfriend's Dragsmaids Wedding Trip =

Episode of RuPaul's Drag Race All Stars

- RuPaul's Drag Race All Stars episode
- Episode no.: Season 3 Episode 7
- Directed by: Nick Murray
- Presented by: RuPaul
- Original air date: March 8, 2018

Guest appearances
- Garcelle Beauvais (guest judge); Chris Colfer (guest judge); Nancy Pelosi

Episode chronology
| ← Previous "Handmaids to Kitty Girls" | Next → "A Jury of Their Queers" |
- RuPaul's Drag Race All Stars season 3

"My Best Squirrelfriend's Dragsmaids Wedding Trip" is the seventh episode of the third season of the American television series RuPaul's Drag Race All Stars. It originally aired on March 8, 2018. The episode's main challenge tasks the contestants with performing in a "raunchy girl comedy blockbuster". Garcelle Beauvais and Chris Colfer are guest judges. Nancy Pelosi also makes a guest appearance. Morgan McMichaels is eliminated from the competition by Shangela, who places in the top and wins a lip-sync contest against Trixie Mattel to "Freaky Money" by RuPaul featuring Big Freedia.

== Episode ==
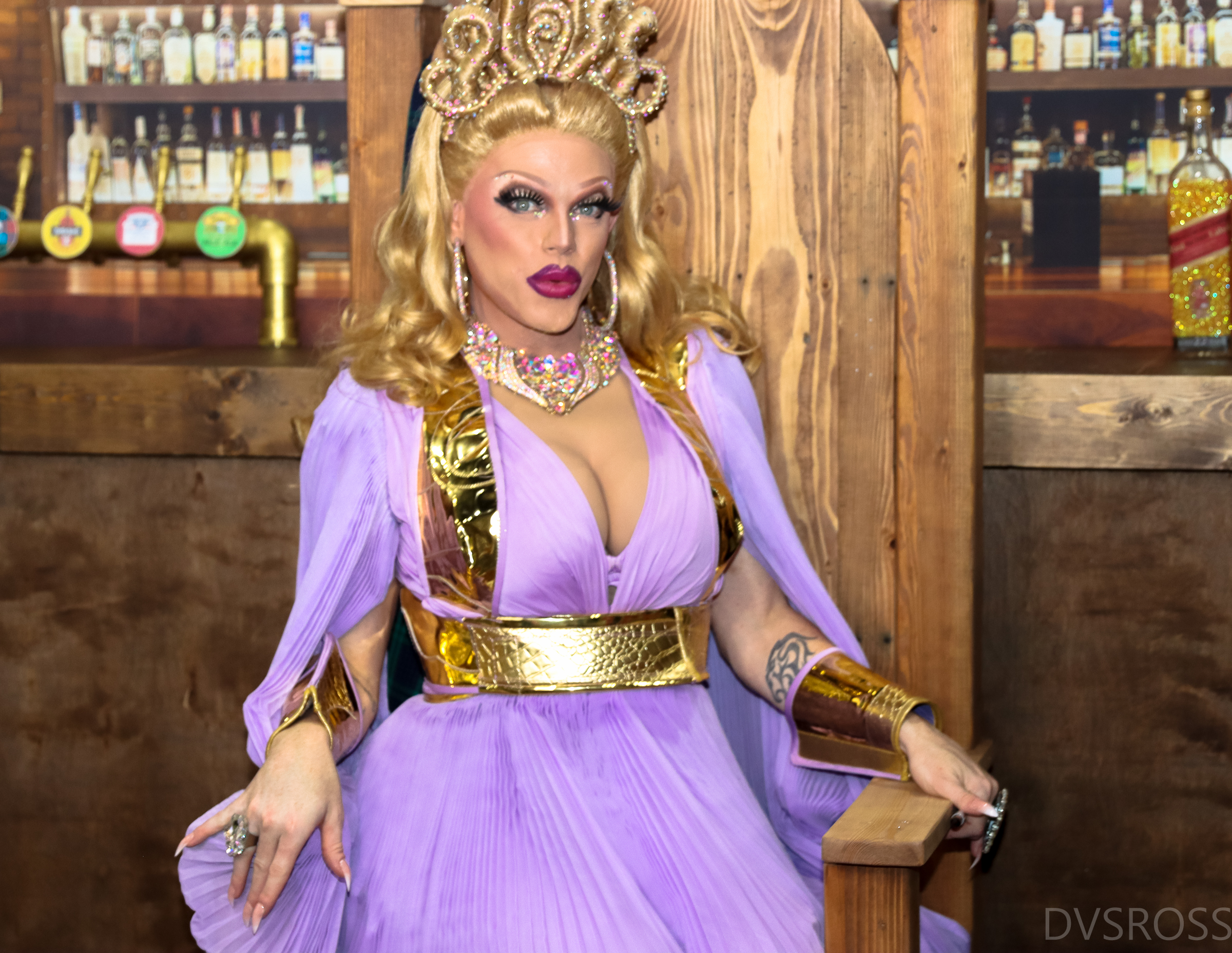
Morgan McMichaels (pictured in 2023) is eliminated from the competition.

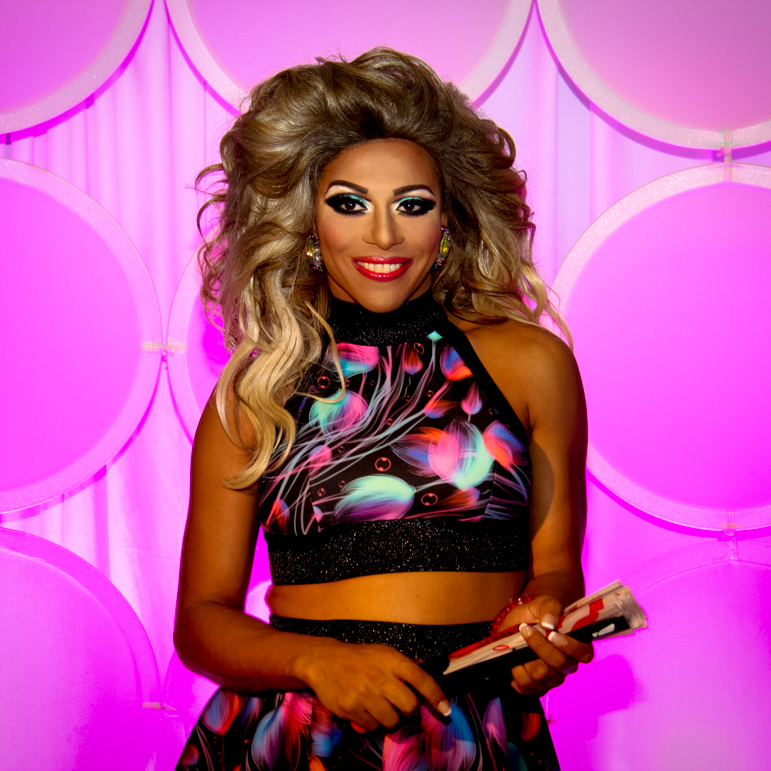
Shangela (pictured in 2017) wins the episode's lip-sync contest.

The contestants return to the workroom after BenDeLaCreme eliminated herself on the previous episode. The contestants discuss BenDeLaCreme's decision. BeBe Zahara Benet does not reveal who she would have chosen to return or to eliminate from the competition had she won the lip-sync contest. On a new day, RuPaul greets the group and invites Nancy Pelosi to join. RuPaul and Pelosi remind the contestants and audience about the importance of voting. Pelosi departs, then RuPaul reveals the main challenge, which tasks the contestants with starring in the "raunchy girl comedy blockbuster" My Best Squirrelfriend's Dragsmaids Wedding Trip. RuPaul describes the film's roles. As the returning contestant, Morgan McMichaels is tasked with assigning the roles.

The contestants read the script and share their preferences. Morgan McMichaels assigns the following roles:

- BeBe Zahara Benet as The Queen
- Kennedy Davenport as La La
- Morgan McMichaels as Beige Swan
- Shangela as Actavia
- Trixie Mattel as Sharon Frockovich

The contestants film, with Ross Mathews as the director. On elimination day, the contestants make final preparations for the fashion show. The contestants talk about Trixie Mattel's and BeBe Zahara Benet's personalities. Kennedy Davenport describes feeling looked over at times.

On the main stage, RuPaul welcomes fellow judges Michelle Visage and Mathews, as well as guest judges Garcelle Beauvais and Chris Colfer. RuPaul shares the assignment of the main challenge and the runway category ("Red for Filth"), then the fashion show commences. After the contestants present their looks, the judges watch scenes from the film, deliver their critiques, and share the results. Shangela and Trixie Mattel are declared the top two contestants. BeBe Zahara Benet, Kennedy Davenport, and Morgan McMichaels place in the bottom three. The contestants deliberate in the workroom, then Shangela and Trixie Mattel face off in a lip-sync contest to "Freaky Money" by RuPaul featuring Big Freedia. Shangela wins the lip-sync and decides to eliminate Morgan McMichaels from the competition. Morgan McMichaels returns to the workroom to write a message on the mirror for the remaining contestants. Back on the main stage, RuPaul asks the viewers to support their preferred winner on social media.

== Production and broadcast ==
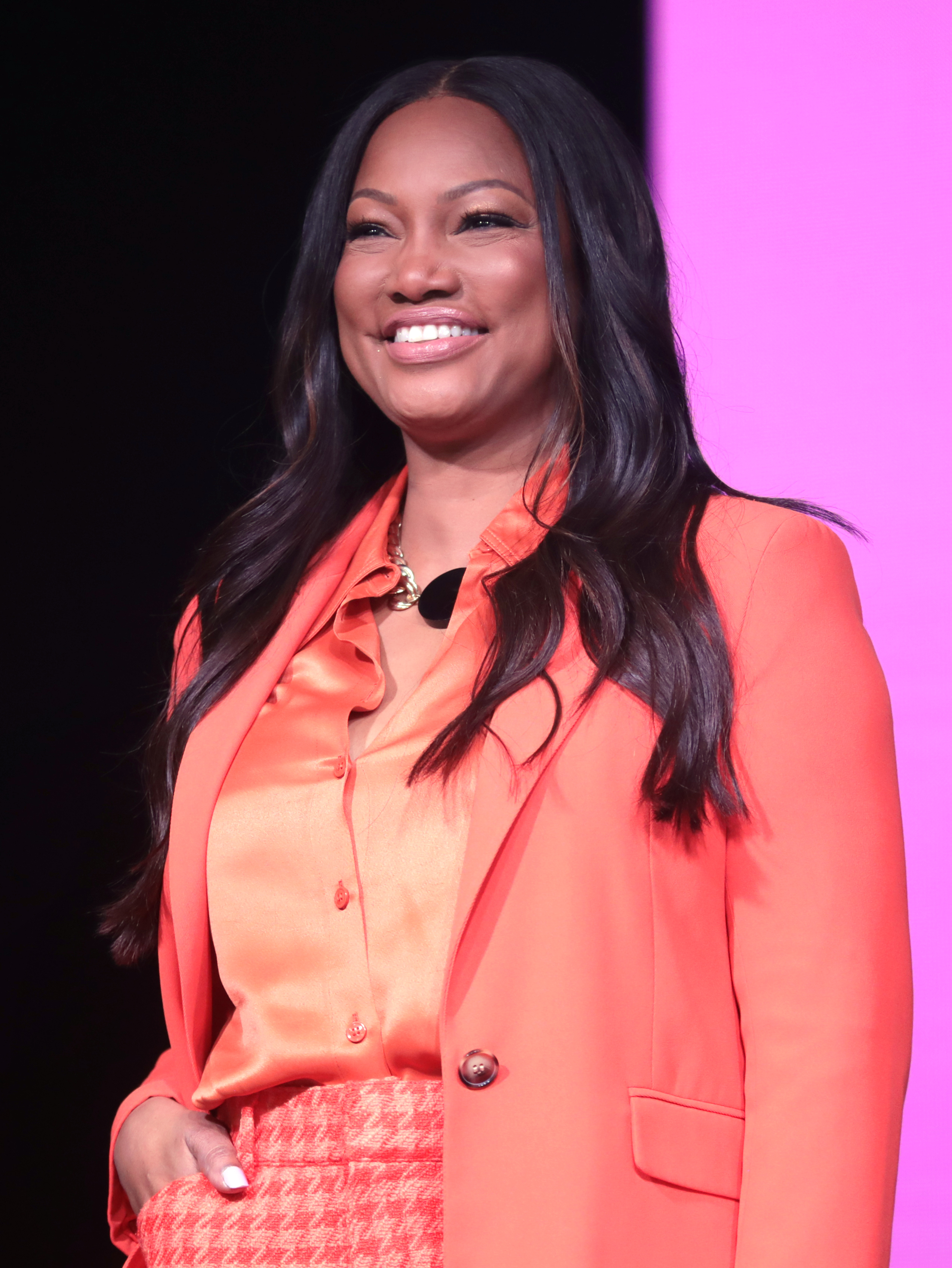
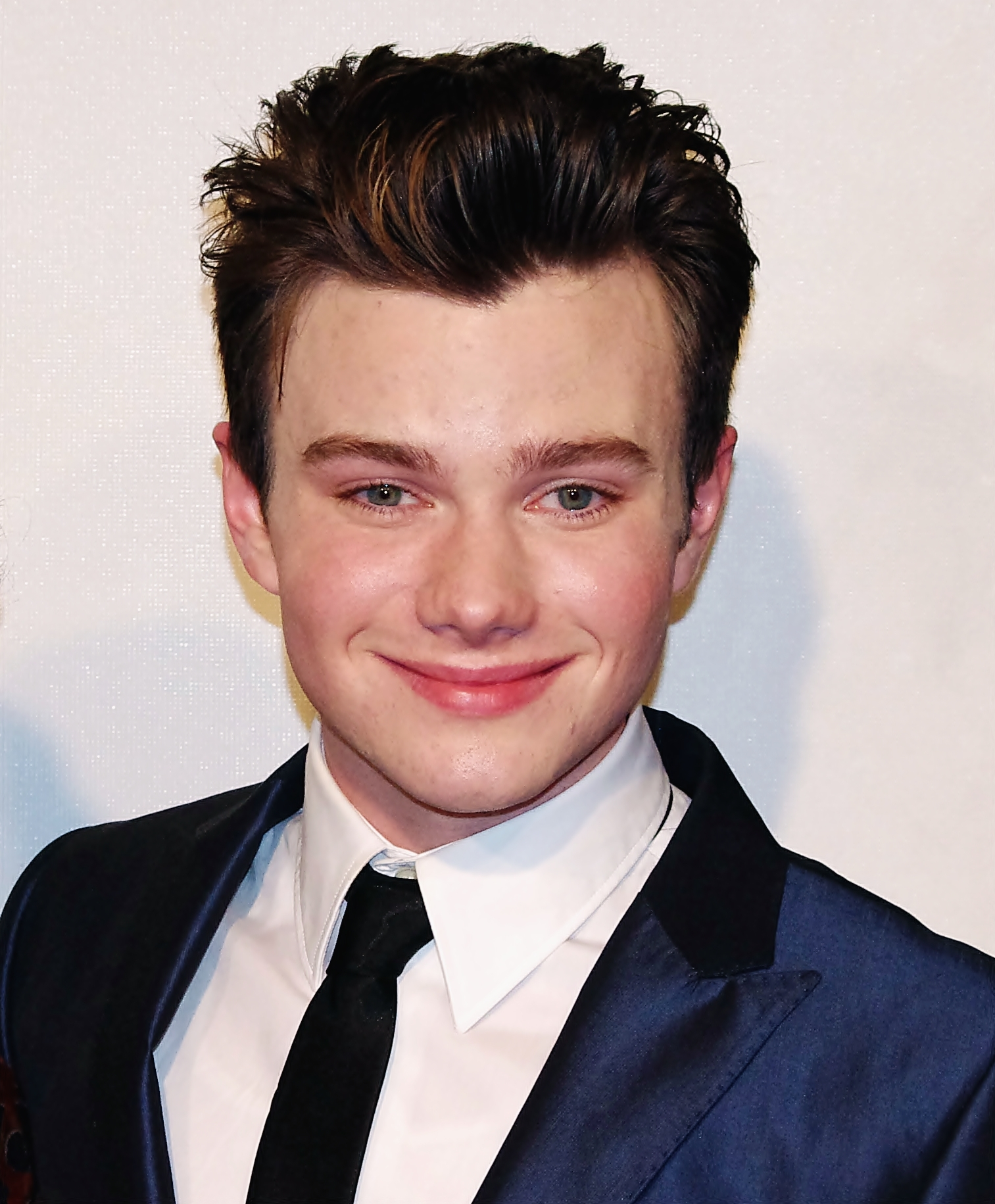
Garcelle Beauvais (pictured in 2022) and Chris Colfer (pictured in 2012) are guest judges.

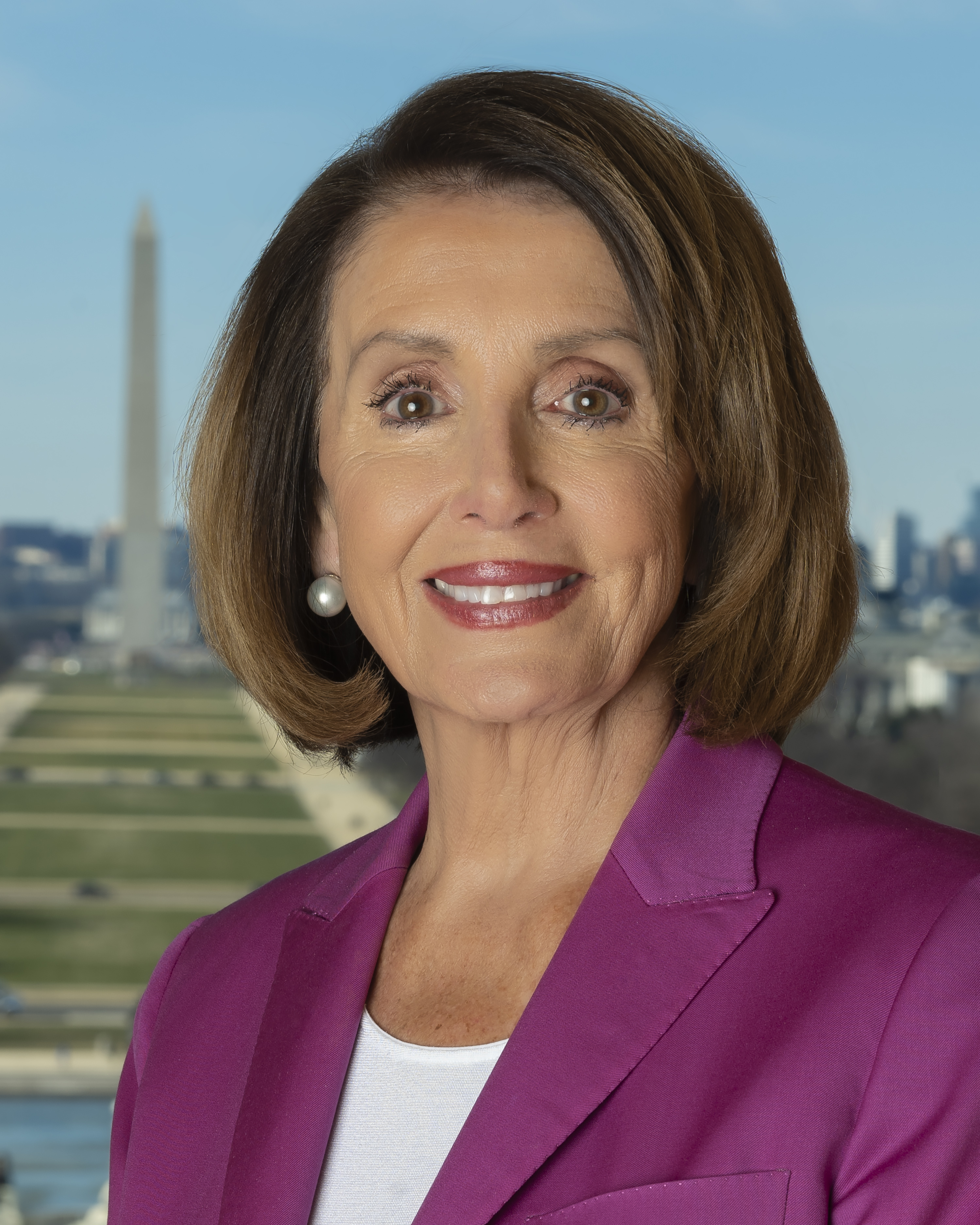
Nancy Pelosi (pictured in 2019) also makes a guest appearance.

The episode originally aired on March 8, 2018.

The Independent said the film had "cheap parodies of powerful women". While the contestants deliberate in the workroom, BeBe Zahara Benet reveals she is not familiar with Ornacia.

=== Fashion ===
In the workroom, RuPaul wears a blue suit with a matching dress shirt. For the main stage, RuPaul has a pink dress, gold earrings, and a blonde wig. Beauvais wears a yellow dress and Colfer has a suit with a pink tie. For the film, BeBe Zahara Benet wears a pink outfit with a matching hat. She carries a handbag and has a silver wig. Shangela has a plaid outfit, white glasses, and a dark wig. Trixie Mattel wears a short denim skirt, black footwear, and a brown wig. Kennedy Davenport has a yellow dress with white polka dots and a brown wig. Morgan McMichaels wears a tutu, feathers across her chest, and a blonde wig.

For the fashion show, the contestants wear red outfits. BeBe Zahara Benet has a dress and a head covering. Shangela has a spiky outfit and a long blonde wig styled as a braid. Morgan McMichaels has a plaid skirt and a red wig. Trixie Mattel wears glasses, a blonde wig, and a headpiece resembling a stack of books. Kennedy Davenport has a jeweled gown with large earrings and a dark wig. For the lip-sync, Shangela removes her robe to reveal a fatsuit and blue tights. Trixie Mattel has a pink catsuit, matching high-heeled shoes, and a neon wig.

== Reception ==
Oliver Sava of The A.V. Club gave the episode a rating of 'C'. Writing for Vulture, Matt Rogers and Bowen Yang rated the episode three out of five stars. Tim Mulkerin of Mic called the acting challenge "a train wreck of a spoof". Paul Hagen of Metrosource said the challenge was among the show's worst. Kevin O'Keeffe of INTO Magazine said the episode had a "nonsense" challenge. Writing for Xtra Magazine in 2021, he called the challenge "absolutely dire".
