= All Star Super Queen Variety Show =

Episode of RuPaul's Drag Race All Stars

- RuPaul's Drag Race All Stars episode
- Episode no.: Season 4 Episode 1
- Presented by: RuPaul
- Original air date: December 14, 2018

Guest appearance
- Jenifer Lewis

Episode chronology
← Previous "A Jury of Their Queers"	Next → "Super Girl Groups, Henny"
- RuPaul's Drag Race All Stars (season 4)

"All Star Super Queen Variety Show" is the first episode of the fourth season of the American television series RuPaul's Drag Race All Stars. It originally aired on December 14, 2018. The episode's main challenge tasks the contestants with performing in a talent show called the "All Star-Spangled Variety Show". Jenifer Lewis is a guest judge.

Jasmine Masters is eliminated from the competition by Trinity the Tuck, who places in the top of the main challenge and beats Monique Heart in a lip-sync contest to "Emotions" (1991) by Mariah Carey.

== Episode ==
Eight former contestants enter the workroom. RuPaul greets the group and then invites Team Latrila (Latrice Royale and Manila Luzon) to join. RuPaul then reveals that the two additional contestants will be competing individually and not as a team. RuPaul invites members of the Pit Crew to join, then reveals the first mini-challenge, which tasks the contestants with "reading" (or playfully insulting) each other. Latrice Royale wins the mini-challenge.

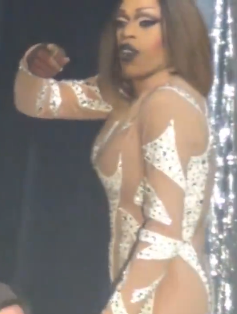
Jasmine Masters (pictured in 2017) is eliminated from the competition.

RuPaul reveals the main challenge, which tasks the contestants with performing in a talent show called the "All Star-Spangled Variety Show", in front of the judges and a live audience. The contestants get out of drag and get acquainted. On elimination day, the contestants prepare for the talent show. On the main stage, RuPaul welcomes fellow Judges Michelle Visage and Carson Kressley, and Ross Mathews, as well as guest judge Jenifer Lewis. RuPaul shares the assignment of the main challenge, then the talent show commences. Following are the contestants and acts:

- Monique Heart – live singing ("Brown Cow Stunning")
- Naomi Smalls – lip-syncing ("Fashion")
- Gia Gunn – kabuki
- Trinity the Tuck – tucking instructional
- Farrah Moan – burlesque
- Monét X Change – live singing and lip-syncing ("Soak It Up")
- Manila Luzon – painting
- Jasmine Masters – stand-up comedy
- Latrice Royale – color guard
- Valentina – lip-syncing

Farrah Moan falls during her routine. After the talent show, the judges deliver their critiques, then share the results with the contestants. Monique Heart and Trinity the Tuck are declared the top two contestants. Farrah Moan and Jasmine Masters are deemed the bottom two contestants. The contestants deliberate in the workroom, then Monique Heart and Trinity the Tuck face off in a lip-sync contest on the main stage to "Emotions" (1991) by Mariah Carey. Trinity the Tuck wins the lip-sync and decides to eliminate Jasmine Masters from the competition. Jasmine Masters returns to the workroom and uses lipstick to write a message on the mirror for the remaining contestants.

== Production and broadcast ==
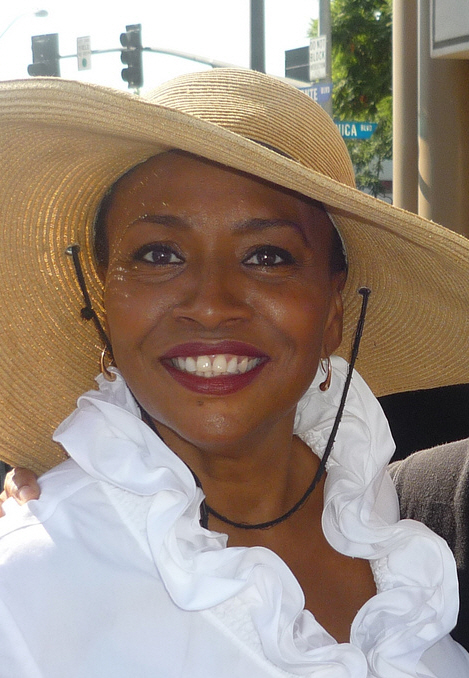
Jenifer Lewis is a guest judge.

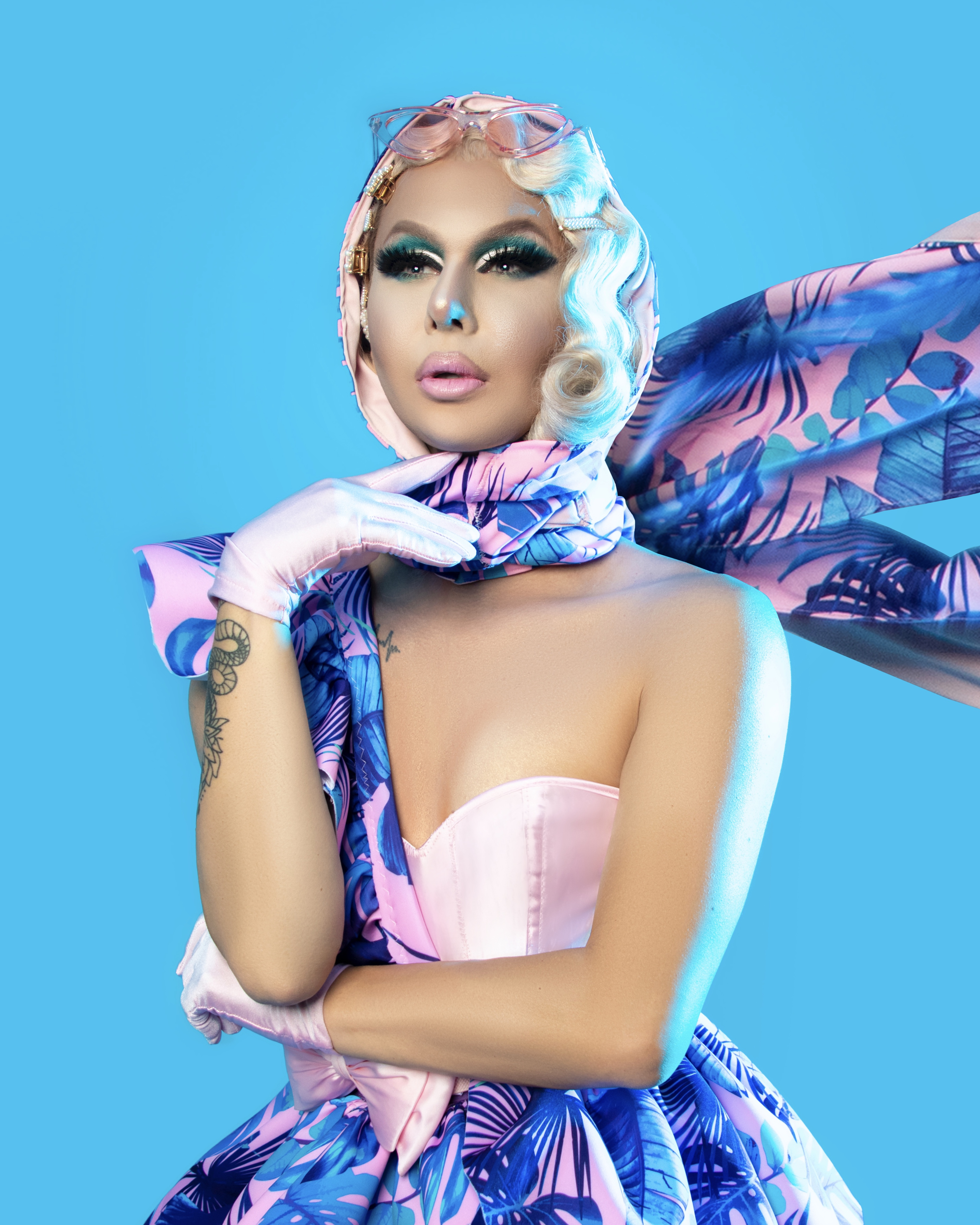
Trinity the Tuck (pictured in 2020) wins the episode's lip-sync contest.

The episode originally aired on December 14, 2018.

Monique Heart's song is based on her catch phrase "brown cow stunning". Her wig comes off during the lip-sync contest.

Gia Gunn has said that her talent show performance was her proudest moment from the season. Monét X Change released a recording of "Soak It Up", along with a music video. Monique Heart released a recording of "Brown Cow Stunning".

=== Fashion ===
For her entrance look, Monique Heart wears a colorful outfit with chaps and a rose motif. Trinity the Tuck has a green outfit made from zip ties, a collar with rings, and an orange wig. Naomi Smalls wears a purple outfit and a dark wig. Monét X Change has a black leotard and a brown wig. Gia Gunn wears a colorful outfit with a religious theme, tall boots, and a crown of thorns. Farrah Moan has a bodysuit and a pink wig. Jasmine Masters wears a black pantsuit with a floral print, red high-heeled shoes, and a long dark wig. Valentina has a black dress, matching gloves and high-heels, a brown wig, and a fascinator. Latrice Royale wears a purple dress and a brown wig. Manila Luzon has a yellow outfit and a wig that is part blonde and part dark.

In the workroom, RuPaul wears a green-and-white suit and a white dress shirt. On the main stage, RuPaul has a pink dress, a matching headpiece, and a blonde wig. For her performance, Monique Heart wears a bodysuit with a cow print, matching boots, and a blonde wig. Naomi Smalls has a long blue dress and jacket, which she removes, as well as sunglasses and a blonde wig. Gia Gunn wears a colorful traditional Japanese outfit and carries a parasol and hand fans. Trinity the Tuck has a colorful dress, a white top, and a red wig. Farrah Moan wears a purple dress, matching gloves, and a pink wig. She removes the dress to reveal a corset, which she also removes. Monét X Change has a yellow bodysuit with many sponges attached. She also wears blue high-heels, matching earrings, and a dark wig. Manila Luzon has a white frock, a beret, and a dark wig. She removes the frock to reveals a colorful dress underneath. Jasmine Masters wears a black-and-white suit and a short dark wig. Latrice Royale has a black-and-blue outfit and a short blonde wig. Valentina wears a short silver dress and a blonde wig. She holds a face mask at the start of her performance. For the final lip-sync contest, Trinity the Tuck has a long pink dress a necklace, and a red wig.

== Reception ==
Kate Kulzick of The A.V. Club gave the episode a rating of 'B'. Writing for Vulture, Matt Rogers rated the episode five out of five stars. Sam Brooks ranked the "Emotions" performance number 48 in The Spinoff's 2019 "definitive ranking" of 162 lip-sync contests to date.
