= The Bitchelor =

2018 episode of RuPaul's Drag Race All Stars

- RuPaul's Drag Race All Stars episode
- Episode no.: Season 3 Episode 3
- Presented by: RuPaul
- Original air date: February 8, 2018

Guest appearances
- Jeffrey Bowyer-Chapman; * Constance Zimmer

Episode chronology
← Previous "Divas Lip Sync Live"	Next → "All Stars Snatch Program"
- RuPaul's Drag Race All Stars season 3

"The Bitchelor" is the third episode of the third season of the American television series RuPaul's Drag Race All Stars. It originally aired on VH1 February 8, 2018. The episode's main challenge tasks the contestants with improvising in a parody of reality dating competition series The Bachelor, with Canadian actor and model Jeffrey Bowyer-Chapman as a guest actor. Bowyer-Chapman is also a guest judge, along with American actress Constance Zimmer.

BenDeLaCreme and Kennedy Davenport are the winners of the main challenge. Milk is eliminated from the competition after placing in the bottom and being voted out by Kennedy Davenport, who wins a lip-sync contest against Kennedy Davenport to "Green Light" by Lorde.

== Episode ==
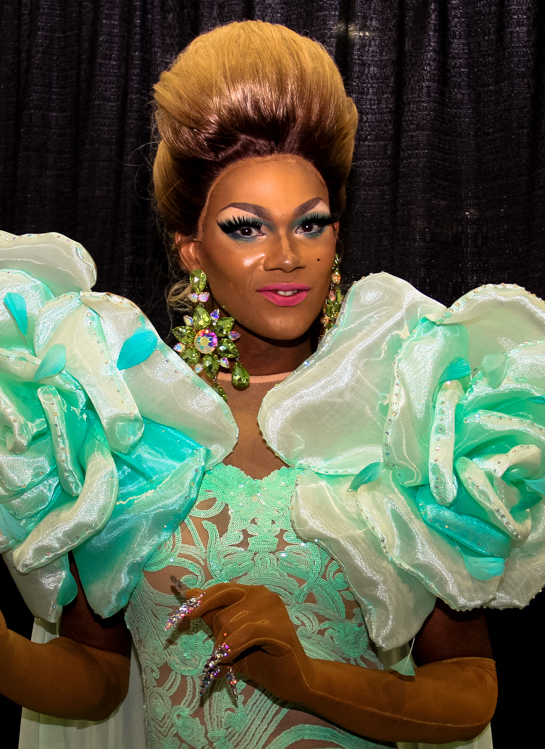
Chi Chi DeVayne (pictured in 2018) is eliminated from the competition by BenDeLaCreme.

The remaining contestants return to the workroom after Thorgy Thor's elimination on the previous episode. BenDeLaCreme reveals that she also would have eliminated Thorgy Thor from the competition had she won the lip-sync contest. On a new day, RuPaul greets the group and reveals the main challenge, which tasks the contestants with improvising in a parody of The Bachelor, with Jeffrey Bowyer-Chapman as a guest actor. RuPaul assigns the acting partners and roles, which have specific personalities.

The contestants start to develop their characters, then film with Michelle Visage as the director and RuPaul as the host. On elimination day, the contestants prepare for the fashion show. On the main stage, RuPaul welcomes fellow judges Visage and Ross Mathews, as well as guest judges Bowyer-Chapman and Constance Zimmer. RuPaul shares the assignment of the main challenge and the Roxxxy Andrews-inspired runway category ("Wigs on Wigs on Wigs"), then the fashion show commences.

After the contestants present their looks, the judges deliver their critiques and share the results. BenDeLaCreme and Kennedy Davenport are declared the winners of the main challenge. Aja, Chi Chi DeVayne, and Milk place in the bottom. The contestants deliberate, then BenDeLaCreme and Kennedy Davenport face off in a lip-sync contest to "Green Light" (2017) by Lorde. Kennedy Davenport wins the lip-sync and decides to eliminate Milk from the competition. Milk returns to the workroom to leave a message on the mirror for the remaining contestants. Milk watches a video message from RuPaul, then Alaska and Chad Michaels appear behind her in the workroom.

== Production and broadcast ==
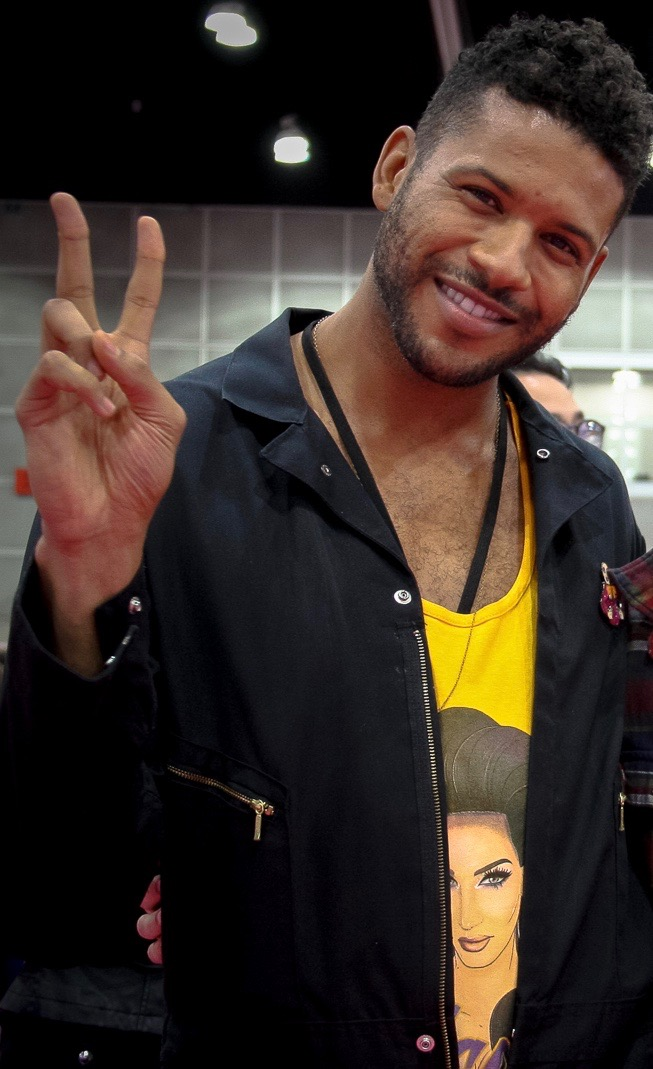
Jeffrey Bowyer-Chapman (pictured in 2019) is a guest judge and actor in The Bitchelor.

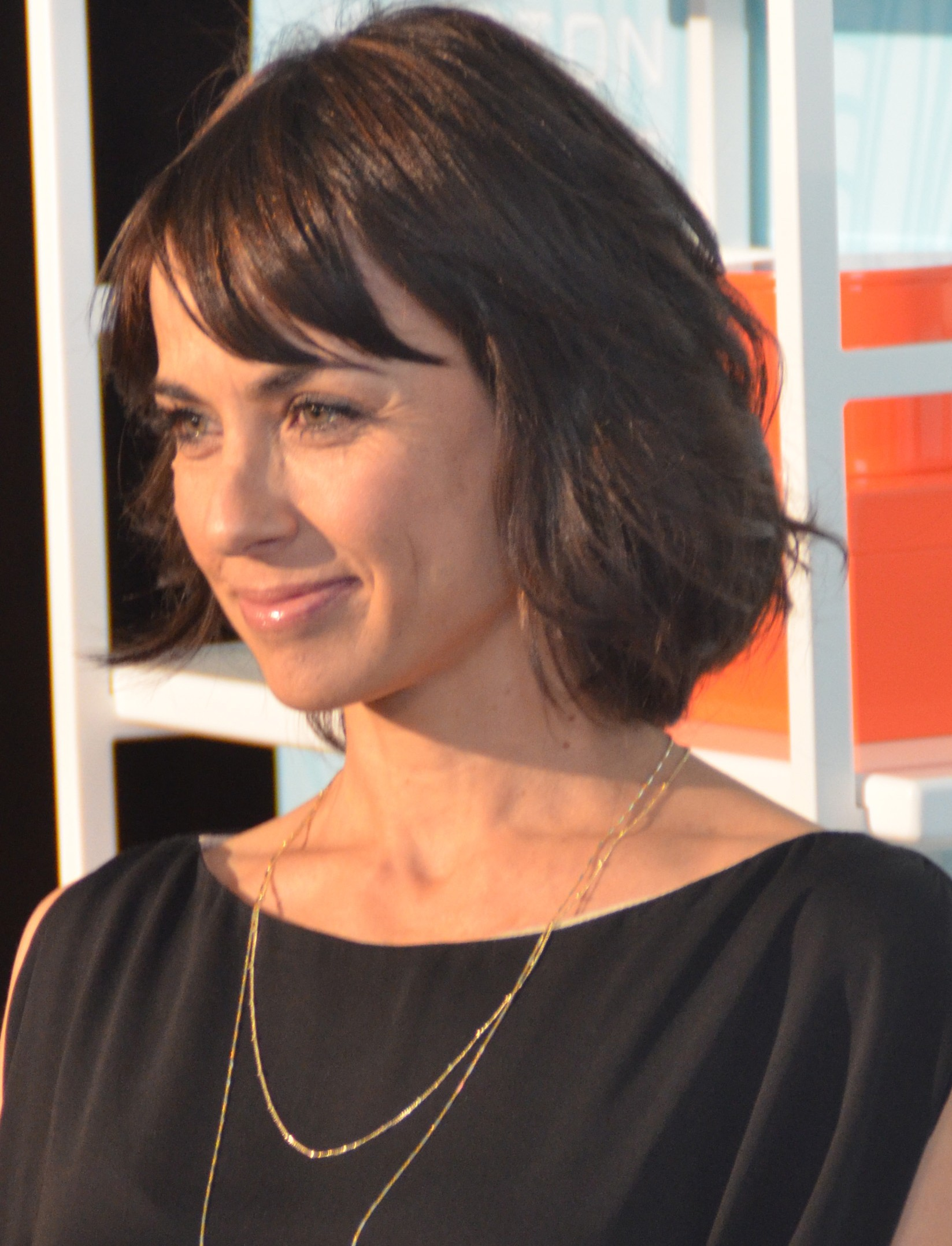
Constance Zimmer (pictured in 2014) is a guest judge.

The episode originally aired on VH1 February 8, 2018.

During the episode, Kennedy Davenport says, "Fuck my drag, right?", which became a meme.

=== Fashion ===
For The Bitchelor, BeBe Zahara Benet wears a colorful outfit. BenDeLaCreme has a pink dress, matching high-heeled shoes, hoop earrings, and blonde wig. Trixie Mattel wears a gold outfit with a white jacket and a blonde wig. Milk has pants, a white dress shirt, and a large blonde wig. Aja wears a light green outfit and a blonde wig. She carries a stuffed dog. Kennedy Davenport has a black-and-white dress, gold jewelry, and a purple wig. Chi Chi DeVayne and Shangela both have black dresses and dark wigs.

For the main stage, RuPaul wears a black-and-gold dress, hoop earrings, and a large blonde wig. For the fashion show, all of the contestants include at least one wig reveal. BenDeLaCreme has a short black dress with matching gloves and a long dark wig. Part of her dress is removed to reveal a skirt made of wigs. BeBe Zahara Benet wears a blue outfit and dark wigs. Trixie Mattel has a series of floral outfits, sunglasses, and a short blonde wig. Milk has a colorful 1960s-inspired outfit. She wears a long ponytail. Aja has an anime-inspired outfit. She removes a yellow headpiece to reveal a blonde wig, which she removes to reveal a purple wig underneath. Kennedy Davenport removes her afro to reveal a short purple wig, which is removed to reveals a shorter blonde wig. Chi Chi DeVayne wears a colorful dress. She removes her afro to reveal a long and straight dark wig. Shangela has a green dress resembling corn. She removes part of her dress and a headpiece to reveal a green wig with popcorn.

== Reception ==
Oliver Sava of The A.V. Club gave the episode a rating of 'A'. Writing for Vulture, Matt Rogers and Bowen Yang rated the episode four out of five stars. Allison Shoemaker included the episode in Consequence's 2018 "Essential Guide to Finally Starting RuPaul's Drag Race", in which she complimented the performances by BenDeLaCreme and Kennedy Davenport. Megan Reynolds of Jezebel said Kennedy Davenport delivered "perhaps the funniest performance in an acting challenge to date—second only to Ginger Minj's star turn with Trixie Mattel in Season 7's John Waters tribute". Sam Brooks ranked the "Green Light" performance number 42 in The Spinoff's 2019 "definitive ranking" of 162 lip-sync contests on Drag Race to date, writing: "I think Ben's performance is elegantly demented, and Kennedy's approach to take on Lorde's post-relationship melanbanger in character as an ageing Gloria Swanson-esque diva is inspired." Bernardo Sim included the "Green Light" performance in Out magazine's 2025 list of the show's 30 best lip-syncs to date. Sim also included "Fuck my drag, right?" in a 2025 list of the show's 32 "best and most hilarious memes".
