= A Jury of Their Queers =

Episode of RuPaul's Drag Race All Stars

- RuPaul's Drag Race All Stars episode
- Episode no.: Season 3 Episode 8
- Presented by: RuPaul
- Original air date: March 15, 2018

Guest appearance
- Todrick Hall (guest choreographer)

Episode chronology
← Previous "My Best Squirrelfriend's Dragsmaids Wedding Trip"	Next → "All Star Super Queen Variety Show"
- RuPaul's Drag Race All Stars (season 3)

"A Jury of Their Queers" is the eighth and final episode of the third season of the American television series RuPaul's Drag Race All Stars. It originally aired on March 15, 2018. The episode's main challenge tasks the contestants with writing, recording, and performing original verses to RuPaul's song "Kitty Girl". Todrick Hall is a guest choreographer. The contestants film a performance in a single take. Judges Michelle Visage, Carson Kressley, and Ross Mathews participate in the performance. Trixie Mattel is crowned the season's winner after placing in the top two and winning a lip-sync contest against Kennedy Davenport to "Wrecking Ball" by Miley Cyrus.

== Episode ==
The contestants return to the workroom after Shangela eliminated Morgan McMichaels from the competition on the previous episode. Trixie Mattel reveals that she would have eliminated Morgan McMichaels had she won the lip-sync contest. On a new day, RuPaul greets the group and reveals the season's final challenge, which tasks the contestants with writing, recording, and performing original verses to RuPaul's song "Kitty Girl". RuPaul shares that the contestants will be rehearsing choreography with Todrick Hall, and that the eliminated contestants will be making another appearance and playing a "vital" role in the final evaluation of the remaining competitors.

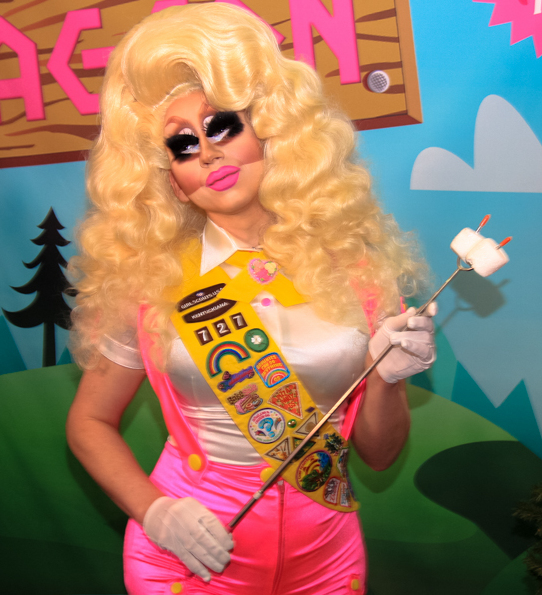
Trixie Mattel (pictured in 2018) is crowned the season's winner.

The finalists talk about how the eliminated contestants might be participating, then rehearse choreography on the main stage with Hall and other dancers. Hall escorts the contestants to another studio, where performance will be filmed in a single take. On coronation day, the finalists make final preparations for the performance and fashion show. The group talk about their progress during the season. On the main stage, RuPaul introduces the performance, which takes place in several spaces and has backing dancers. Judges Michelle Visage, Carson Kressley, and Ross Mathews make special appearances. The performance ends on the main stage, in front of RuPaul and the judges. RuPaul shares the runway category ("Best Drag Eleganza Extravaganza"), then the fashion show commences, with the eliminated contestants watching. RuPaul reveals that the eliminated contestants will be voting for who they want to see in the top two.

The judges deliver their critiques, then the finalists plead their cases to the eliminated contestants in the workroom. Speaking on behalf of the eliminated contestants, Morgan McMichaels reveals that Kennedy Davenport and Trixie Mattel are the top two contestants, eliminating BeBe Zahara Benet and Shangela from the competition. Kennedy Davenport and Trixie Mattel face off in a lip-sync contest to "Wrecking Ball" (2013) by Miley Cyrus. Trixie Mattel is declared the winner, making Kennedy Davenport the runner-up.

== Production and broadcast ==
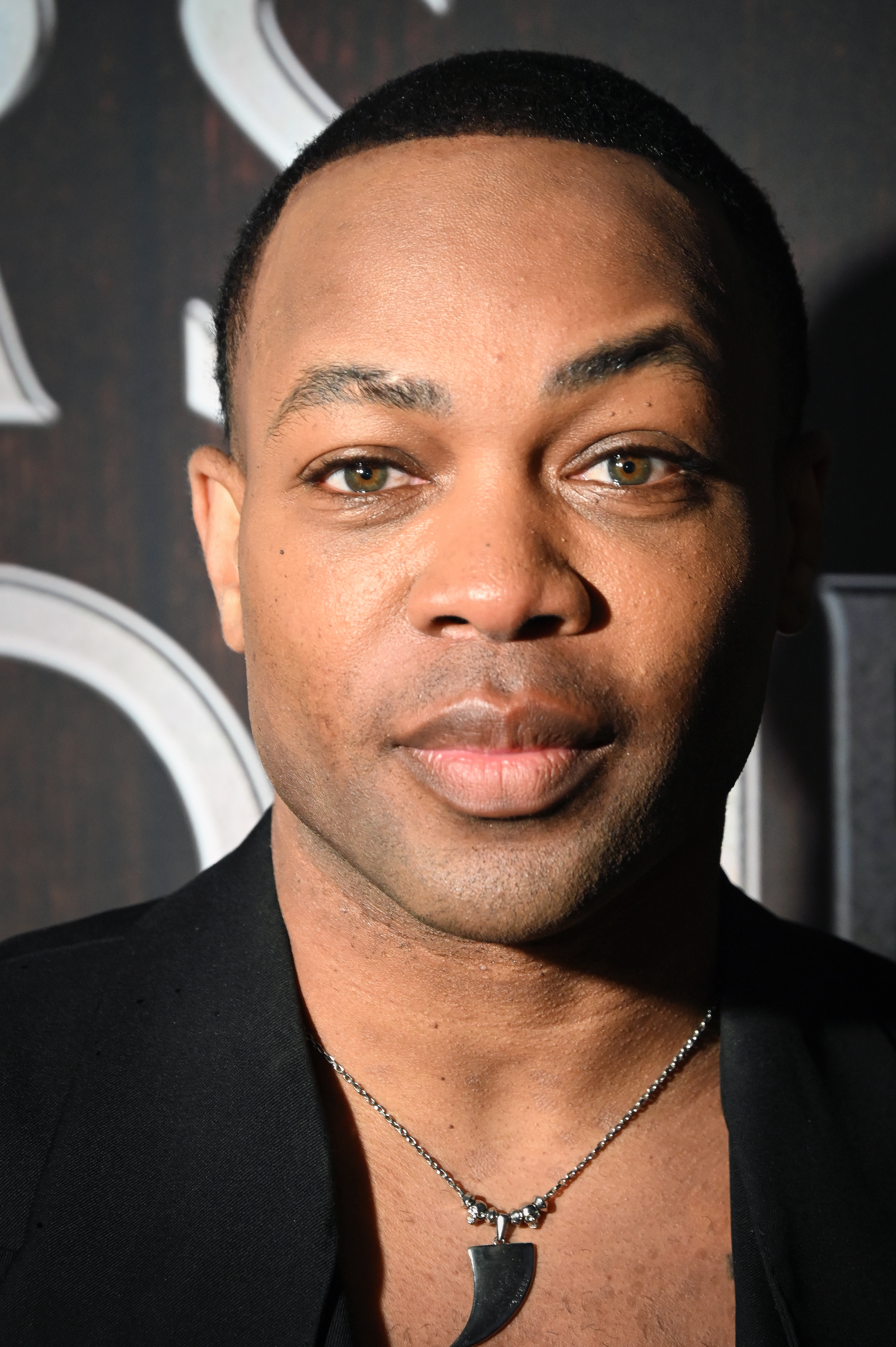
Todrick Hall (pictured in 2016) is a guest choreographer.

The episode originally aired on March 15, 2018.

Fans accused Cyrus of posting spoilers on social media.

=== Fashion ===
For the main stage, RuPaul wears a colorful dress with a checkered pattern and a large blonde wig. For the performance, Kennedy Davenport has a short black outfit and a dark wig. Shangela has a dark bodysuit, matching boots, and a dark wig. BeBe Zahara Benet has a yellow bodysuit and a brown wig. Trixie Mattel has a colorful bodysuit and a purple wig. For the fashion show, BeBe Zahara Benet wears an outfit with an animal print and a leopard headpiece. Kennedy Davenport has a rainbow dress with a long red wig. Shangela wears a flowy gown, large earrings, and a blonde wig. Trixie Mattel has a black outfit and a blonde wig.

Aja wears a red devil-inspired outfit with a necktie, a blonde wig, and horns. BenDeLaCreme has a red dress with matching gloves and a large hat. Chi Chi DeVayne wears a white dress with a blonde wig. Milk has a knitted outfit resembling human anatomy, including breasts, and a brown wig. Morgan McMichaels wears a dark outfit with matching boots, a short dark wig, and a head covering. Thorgy Thor has a colorful outfit with sequins, a matching hat, sunglasses, and a short dark wig. For the final lip-sync, Kenedy Davenport has a dark outfit and a long brown wig. Trixie Mattel has a yellow dress with red flowers, which she removes to reveal a shorter red dress underneath. She also has yellow cowboy boots and a large blonde wig.

== Reception ==
Writing for Vulture, Matt Rogers and Bowen Yang rated the episode three out of five stars. Kevin O'Keeffe of INTO Magazine described the final lip-sync contest as "emotional". Bernardo Sim included the episode in Screen Rant's 2020 overview of the best and worst episode of each season. He said "A Jury of Their Queers" was the worst of the third season and wrote, "All in all, one would be hard-pressed to find a fan that does not have passionate negative feelings toward this episode." Brett White included Shangela's loss in Decider's 2021 overview of the show's ten "most shocking gags". In 2024, Laura Rodini of the Rogue Valley Times described the final lip-sync as a "tear-the-house-down performance".
