= RuPaul's Drag Race All Stars season 3 =

2018 season of RuPaul's Drag Race All Stars

RuPaul's Drag Race All Stars
- Season 3
- Promotional poster for season three
- Hosted by: RuPaul
- Judges: RuPaul Charles; Michelle Visage; Carson Kressley; Ross Mathews
- No. of contestants: 10
- Winner: Trixie Mattel
- Runner-up: Kennedy Davenport
- No. of episodes: 8

Release
- Original network: VH1
- Original release: January 25 – March 15, 2018

Season chronology
- ← Previous; Season 2 Next → Season 4

The third season of RuPaul's Drag Race All Stars premiered on January 25, 2018. The season was announced in August 2017, with 9/10 of the cast revealed during a VH1 "Exclusive Queen Ruveal" special, airing on October 20, 2017. This season of All Stars featured ten "all-star" (or "champion") contestants, selected from the show's first season through to its then-current ninth season, competing again to be inducted into the "Drag Race Hall of Fame".

As was the case in the previous All Stars season, rather than the two lowest-scoring queens for each episode engaging in the usual “Lip-Sync for Your Life” battle for their right to remain in the competition, the two highest-scoring queens on each episode competed in a “Lip-Sync for Your Legacy” performance, the winner of which earned the right to choose which bottom queen gets eliminated (in addition to receiving a $10,000 “tip”). A new twist on how the top queens of the season were chosen was revealed in the previous season's last episode, in which the previously eliminated queens would return during the finale and vote for the top two contestants of the remaining top four; from there-on, the two queens with the most votes advanced while the other two were subsequently eliminated. The prizes for the winner of the competition were a one-year supply of Anastasia Beverly Hills cosmetics and a cash prize of $100,000, and a bejeweled scepter and crown.

The winner of the third season of RuPaul's Drag Race All Stars was ultimately Trixie Mattel, with Kennedy Davenport being the runner-up.

== Contestants ==
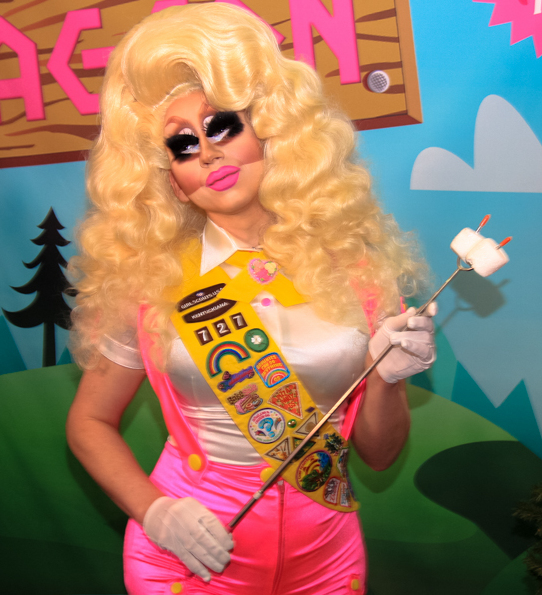
The winner, Trixie Mattel.

Ages, names, and cities stated are at time of filming.

Contestants of RuPaul's Drag Race All Stars season 3 and their backgrounds
Contestant	Age	Hometown	Original season(s)	Original placement(s)	Outcome
Trixie Mattel	28	Milwaukee, Wisconsin	Season 7	6th place	Winner
Kennedy Davenport	35	Dallas, Texas	Season 7	4th place	Runner-up
BeBe Zahara Benet	36	Minneapolis, Minnesota	Season 1	Winner	3rd place
Shangela (Note: Shangela Laquifa Wadley is referred to as her full name on season 2 and as Shangela on season 3 and All Stars 3.)	35	Los Angeles, California	Season 2	12th place	3rd place
Shangela	35	Los Angeles, California	Season 3	6th place	3rd place
Morgan McMichaels	36	Los Angeles, California	Season 2	8th place	5th place (Note: Morgan McMichaels originally placed tenth before re-entering the competition.)
BenDeLaCreme	35	Seattle, Washington	Season 6	5th place (Note: BenDeLaCreme was voted Miss Congeniality on her original season.)	6th place (Note: BenDeLaCreme quit the competition.)
Aja (Note: Aja Miyake-Mugler, formerly known as Aja LaBeija, is referred to as Aja on the show.)	23	New York City, New York	Season 9	9th place	7th place
Chi Chi DeVayne (Note: Chi Chi Kat Devayne is referred to as Chi Chi DeVayne on the show.)	32	Shreveport, Louisiana	Season 8	4th place	8th place
Milk	29	New York City, New York	Season 6	9th place	9th place
Thorgy Thor	33	New York City, New York	Season 8	6th place	10th place

== Contestant progress ==
Legend:

Trixie Mattel won RuPaul's Drag Race All Stars season 3.
Kennedy Davenport was the runner-up.
WIN indicates that the contestant won the challenge and the Lip Sync for Your Legacy.
TOP indicates that the contestant won the challenge, but lost the Lip Sync for Your Legacy.
SAFE indicates that the contestant was declared safe by the judges.
BTM (Bottom) indicates that the contestant was up for elimination.
ELIM (Eliminated) indicates that the contestant was eliminated.
QUIT indicates that BenDeLaCreme quit the competition after winning both the challenge and the Lip Sync for Your Legacy.
IN indicates that the contestant was chosen to re-enter the competition.
OUT indicates that the contestant was not chosen to re-enter the competition.
Juror indicates that the contestant returned to vote for the top two All Stars of the season.

Progress of contestants including placements in each episode
Contestant	Episode							
Contestant	1	2	3	4	5	6	7	8
Trixie Mattel	SAFE	SAFE	SAFE	BTM	TOP2	BTM	TOP2	Winner
Kennedy Davenport	SAFE	BTM	WIN	BTM	SAFE	BTM	BTM	Runner-up
BeBe Zahara Benet	SAFE	SAFE	SAFE	SAFE	WIN	TOP2	BTM	Eliminated
Shangela	SAFE	WIN	SAFE	WIN	BTM	BTM	WIN	Eliminated
Morgan McMichaels	ELIM					IN	ELIM	Juror
BenDeLaCreme	WIN	TOP2	TOP2	WIN	SAFE	QUIT		Juror
Aja	TOP2	SAFE	BTM	SAFE	ELIM	OUT		Juror
Chi Chi DeVayne	BTM	SAFE	BTM	ELIM		OUT		Juror
Milk	SAFE	SAFE	ELIM			OUT		Juror
Thorgy Thor	SAFE	ELIM				OUT		Juror

=== Jury vote ===
In the finale, the eliminated queens were invited back as jurors. They were given two votes each to decide which of the remaining contestants would make the final two, with their first vote worth two points and the second one point. The finalists were given the chance to plead their case prior to the vote.

Legend:

The vote was worth two points being the first choice of the juror.
The vote was worth one point being the second choice of the juror.
The contestant received the most votes and made it to the final lip sync.
The contestant received the second most votes and made it to the final lip sync.
The contestant did not collect enough points to make it to the final lip sync.

Summary of the jury vote, including number of points awarded
Jurors	BeBe	Kennedy	Shangela	Trixie
Aja		2		1
BenDeLa		2		1
Chi Chi		2		1
Milk		1		2
Morgan	2	1		
Thorgy			1	2
Votes	1	5	1	5
Results	2	8	1	7

== Lip syncs ==
Legend:

The contestant was eliminated after their first time in the bottom.
The contestant was eliminated after their second time in the bottom.
The contestant was eliminated after their third time in the bottom.
BenDeLaCreme voted to eliminate herself by writing her name using whiteout on another contestant's lipstick.
The contestant won the Lip Sync for the Crown and was declared the winner of the season.

Episode	Top All Stars (Elimination)			Song	Winner(s)	Bottom	Eliminated
1	Aja (Chi Chi)	vs.	BenDeLaCreme (Morgan)	"Anaconda" (Nicki Minaj)	BenDeLaCreme	Chi Chi, Morgan	Morgan McMichaels
2	BenDeLaCreme (Thorgy)	vs.	Shangela (Thorgy)	"Jump (For My Love)" (The Pointer Sisters)	Shangela	Kennedy, Thorgy	Thorgy Thor
3	BenDeLaCreme (Chi Chi)	vs.	Kennedy Davenport (Milk)	"Green Light" (Lorde)	Kennedy Davenport	Aja, Chi Chi, Milk	Milk
4	BenDeLaCreme (Chi Chi)	vs.	Shangela (Chi Chi)	"I Kissed a Girl" (Katy Perry)	BenDeLaCreme	Chi Chi, Kennedy, Trixie	Chi Chi DeVayne
4	BenDeLaCreme (Chi Chi)	vs.	Shangela (Chi Chi)	"I Kissed a Girl" (Katy Perry)	Shangela	Chi Chi, Kennedy, Trixie	Chi Chi DeVayne
5	BeBe Zahara Benet (Aja)	vs.	Trixie Mattel (Aja)	"The Boss" (Diana Ross)	BeBe Zahara Benet	Aja, Shangela	Aja
6 (Note: On episode 6, the two Top All Stars were asked to choose an eliminated queen to return to the competition in addition to the one to eliminate.)	BeBe Zahara Benet (Trixie / Morgan) (Note: BeBe Zahara Benet chose not to show both whom she selected to return and to eliminate. On May 3, 2020, on Trinity the Tuck's podcast, Aja asserted that Bebe wanted to eliminate Trixie Mattel and to save Morgan McMichaels.)	vs.	BenDeLaCreme (BenDeLa / Morgan)	"Nobody's Supposed to Be Here (Hex Hector Dance Mix)" (Deborah Cox)	BenDeLaCreme	Kennedy, Shangela, Trixie	BenDeLaCreme
7	Shangela (Morgan)	vs.	Trixie Mattel (Morgan)	"Freaky Money" (RuPaul ft. Big Freedia)	Shangela	BeBe, Kennedy, Morgan	Morgan McMichaels
Episode	Final All Stars			Song	Winner		
8	Kennedy Davenport	vs.	Trixie Mattel	"Wrecking Ball" (Miley Cyrus)	Trixie Mattel		

== Guest judges ==
Listed in chronological order:

- Vanessa Hudgens, actress and singer
- Todrick Hall, actor and singer
- Vanessa Williams, actress and singer
- Constance Zimmer, actress
- Jeffrey Bowyer-Chapman, actor and model
- Nicole Byer, comedian and actress
- Kristin Chenoweth, actress and singer
- Tituss Burgess, actor and singer
- Shay Mitchell, actress and model
- Adam Lambert, singer and actor
- Emma Bunton, singer and actress
- Chris Colfer, actor and singer
- Garcelle Beauvais, actress and model

=== Special guests ===
Guests who appeared in episodes but did not judge on the main stage (in order of appearance):

- Chad Michaels, runner-up from season four and winner of season one of All Stars
- Alaska, runner-up from season five and winner of season two of All Stars
- Marc Jacobs, fashion designer
- Nancy Pelosi, former Speaker of the United States House of Representatives and Representative for California's 12th congressional district

== Episodes ==
No. overall	No. in season	Title	Original release date
16	1	"All-Star Variety Show"	January 25, 2018
Ten all-stars enter the workroom. For the first mini-challenge, the queens will read each other to filth. BenDeLaCreme wins the mini-challenge. For the main challenge, the queens will perform a talent show in front of the judges and a live audience.: Aja - Lip-syncing and dancing; BeBe Zahara Benet - Lip-syncing and African Tribal dancing; BenDeLaCreme - Burlesque; Chi Chi DeVayne - Baton twirling; Kennedy Davenport - Dancing; Milk - Singing and velcro; Morgan McMichaels - Lip-syncing; Shangela- Lip-syncing; Thorgy Thor - Violin; Trixie Mattel - Autoharp and singing; On the runway, Aja, BenDeLaCreme, Shangela and Thorgy Thor receive positive critiques, with Aja and BenDeLaCreme being announced as the top two. Chi Chi DeVayne and Morgan McMichaels receive negative critiques, and are announced as the bottom two. Aja and BenDeLaCreme lip-sync to "Anaconda" by Nicki Minaj. BenDeLaCreme wins the lip-sync and decides to eliminate Morgan McMichaels from the competition.: Guest Judge: Vanessa Hudgens; Mini-Challenge: Reading is Fundamental; Mini-Challenge Winner: BenDeLaCreme; Mini-Challenge Prize: A $3,000 shopping spree to L.A. Eyeworks; Main Challenge: Perform a talent in front of the judges and a live audience; Top Two: Aja and BenDeLaCreme; Challenge Prize: A Five-night stay at The Grand Resort and Spa in Fort Lauderdale, air fare included; Lip-Sync Song: "Anaconda" by Nicki Minaj; Lip-Sync for Your Legacy Winner: BenDeLaCreme; Bottom Two: Chi Chi DeVayne and Morgan McMichaels; Eliminated: Morgan McMichaels; Farewell Message: "I love you girls! Keep rocking and stay FABULOUS!"
17	2	"Divas Lip Sync Live"	February 1, 2018
At the beginning of the episode, Aja reveals that she would have sent home Chi Chi DeVayne from the competition, had she won the lip-sync. For the main challenge, the queens will perform in a lip-syncing dance number inspired by VH1 Divas.: Aja as Amy Winehouse; BeBe Zahara Benet as Diana Ross; BenDeLaCreme as Julie Andrews; Chi Chi DeVayne as Patti LaBelle; Kennedy Davenport as Janet Jackson; Milk as Celine Dion; Shangela as Mariah Carey; Thorgy Thor as Stevie Nicks; Trixie Mattel as Dolly Parton; On the runway, category is RuDemption Runway. BeBe Zahara Benet, BenDeLaCreme and Shangela receive positive critiques, with BenDeLaCreme and Shangela being announced as the top two. Chi Chi DeVayne, Kennedy Davenport and Thorgy Thor receive negative critiques, with Kennedy Davenport and Thorgy Thor being announced as the bottom two. BenDeLaCreme and Shangela lip-sync to "Jump (For My Love)" by The Pointer Sisters. Shangela wins the lip-sync and decides to eliminate Thorgy Thor from the competition.: Guest Judges: Todrick Hall and Vanessa Williams; Alternating Judge: Carson Kressley; Main Challenge: Perform a lip-syncing dance number inspired by VH1 Divas; Runway Theme: RuDemption Runway; Top Two: BenDeLaCreme and Shangela; Challenge Prize: A $1000 gift card from Sparkles Rhinestones and a $1000 gift card from Fierce Queen Heels; Lip-Sync Song: "Jump (For My Love)" by The Pointer Sisters; Lip-Sync for Your Legacy Winner: Shangela; Bottom Two: Kennedy Davenport and Thorgy Thor; Eliminated: Thorgy Thor; Farewell Message: "Wooo! Drag is fun. Suck it ShangeLLA!" [Drawing of an ejaculating penis]
18	3	"The Bitchelor"	February 8, 2018
At the beginning of the episode, BenDeLaCreme reveals that she would have sent home Thorgy Thor from the competition, had she won the lip-sync. For this week's main challenge, the queens will pair up and improvise in an unscripted dating show inspired by The Bachelor called "The Bitchelor".: Aja and Kennedy Davenport; BeBe Zahara Benet and BenDeLaCreme; Chi Chi DeVayne and Shangela; Milk and Trixie Mattel; On the runway, category is Wigs on Wigs on Wigs. BenDeLaCreme, Kennedy Davenport and Trixie Mattel receive positive critiques, with BenDeLaCreme and Kennedy Davenport being announced as the top two. Aja, Chi Chi DeVayne and Milk receive negative critiques, and are announced as the bottom three. BenDeLaCreme and Kennedy Davenport lip-sync to "Green Light" by Lorde. Kennedy Davenport wins the lip-sync and decides to eliminate Milk from the competition.: Guest Judges: Constance Zimmer and Jeffrey Bowyer-Chapman; Alternating Judge: Ross Mathews; Main Challenge: In pairs, improvise in an unscripted dating show inspired by The Bachelor called "The Bitchelor"; Runway Theme: Wigs on Wigs on Wigs; Top Two: BenDeLaCreme and Kennedy Davenport; Challenge Prize: A jewelry pack from Fierce Drag Jewels and a $1000 gift card to Nailed by Cristy; Lip-Sync Song: "Green Light" by Lorde; Lip-Sync for Your Legacy Winner: Kennedy Davenport; Bottom Three: Aja, Chi Chi DeVayne, and Milk; Eliminated: Milk; Farewell Message: "Love u girls but ya'll know this is bogus! Stay amazing ❤ Milk"
19	4	"All Stars Snatch Program"	February 15, 2018
At the beginning of the episode, BenDeLaCreme reveals that she would have sent home Chi Chi DeVayne from the competition, had she won the lip-sync. For the main challenge, the queens will play the Snatch Game. Carson Kressley and Michelle Visage star as the celebrity contestants. The cast consisted of: Aja as Crystal LaBeija; BeBe Zahara Benet as Grace Jones; BenDeLaCreme as Paul Lynde; Chi Chi DeVayne as Maya Angelou; Kennedy Davenport as Phaedra Parks; Shangela as Jenifer Lewis; Trixie Mattel as RuPaul; On the runway, category is Flower Power. Aja, BenDeLaCreme and Shangela receive positive critiques, with BenDeLaCreme and Shangela being announced as the top two. Chi Chi DeVayne, Kennedy Davenport and Trixie Mattel receive negative critiques, and are announced as the bottom three. BenDeLaCreme and Shangela lip-sync to "I Kissed a Girl" by Katy Perry. BenDeLaCreme and Shangela win the lip-sync and both decide to eliminate Chi Chi DeVayne from the competition.: Guest Judges: Kristin Chenoweth and Nicole Byer; Alternating Judge: Carson Kressley; Main Challenge: Snatch Game; Runway Theme: Flower Power; Top Two: BenDeLaCreme and Shangela; Challenge Prize: A wig wardrobe courtesy of Rockstar Wigs and a $1000 gift card from Coolhaus Ice Cream; Lip-Sync Song: "I Kissed a Girl" by Katy Perry; Lip-Sync for Your Legacy Winners: BenDeLaCreme and Shangela; Bottom Three: Chi Chi DeVayne, Kennedy Davenport, and Trixie Mattel; Eliminated: Chi Chi DeVayne; Farewell Message: "LOVE All of you gals, Remember to Keep it fair. Chi Chi 💋"
20	5	"Pop Art Ball"	February 22, 2018
For this week's mini-challenge, the queens will do a pop art-style portrait photoshoot. Aja wins the mini-challenge. For the main challenge, the queens will create two looks for The Pop Art Ball: a wearable soup can inspired by Andy Warhol and a Studio 54 disco look. On the runway, BeBe Zahara Benet and Trixie Mattel receive positive critiques, and are announced as the top two. Aja and Shangela receive negative critiques, and are announced as the bottom two. BeBe Zahara Benet and Trixie Mattel lip-sync to "The Boss" by Diana Ross. BeBe Zahara Benet wins the lip-sync and decides to eliminate Aja from the competition.: Guest Judges: Tituss Burgess and Shay Mitchell; Alternating Judge: Ross Mathews; Mini-Challenge: Pop art-style portrait photoshoot; Mini-Challenge Winner: Aja; Mini-Challenge Prize: A year's supply of hamburgers from Hamburger Mary's and $2,000; Main Challenge: The Pop Art Ball; Runway Themes: Andy Warhol inspired soup cans and a Studio 54 disco look; Top Two: BeBe Zahara Benet and Trixie Mattel; Challenge Prize: A Two-night escape for 2 at the W Hotel in Fort Lauderdale; Lip-Sync Song: "The Boss" by Diana Ross; Lip-Sync for Your Legacy Winner: BeBe Zahara Benet; Bottom Two: Aja and Shangela; Eliminated: Aja; Farewell Message: "I love u bitches❤ Honestly, thank you from the bottom of my heart! Y'all inspire me! -Aja"
21	6	"Handmaids to Kitty Girls"	March 1, 2018
At the beginning of the episode, the previously eliminated queens all return to the workroom. Trixie Mattel reveals that she would have sent home Aja from the competition, had she won the lip-sync. For the main challenge, the eliminated queens and the remaining queens will write, record, and perform their own verses to two different songs.: Team Drag Up Your Life - BeBe Zahara Benet, BenDeLaCreme, Kennedy Davenport, Shangela and Trixie Mattel; Team Sitting on a Secret - Aja, Chi Chi DeVayne, Milk, Morgan McMichaels and Thorgy Thor; On the runway, BeBe Zahara Benet and BenDeLaCreme receive positive critiques, and are announced as the top two. Kennedy Davenport, Shangela and Trixie Mattel receive negative critiques, and are announced as the bottom three. RuPaul reveals that whoever wins the lip-sync, will choose one eliminated queen to return to the competition, and one of the competing queens to eliminate from the competition. BeBe Zahara Benet and BenDeLaCreme lip-sync to "Nobody's Supposed to Be Here (Hex Hector Dance Mix)" by Deborah Cox. BenDeLaCreme wins the lip-sync. She chooses Morgan McMichaels to return to the competition and then chooses to eliminate herself from the competition.: Guest Judges: Adam Lambert and Emma Bunton; Alternating Judge: Carson Kressley; Main Challenge: Write, record, and perform their own verses to two different songs; Top Two: BeBe Zahara Benet and BenDeLaCreme; Challenge Prize: $1,000 gift card to The Spa on Rodeo and a $1,000 gift card to MuLondon; Lip-Sync Song: "Nobody's Supposed to Be Here (Hex Hector Dance Mix)" by Deborah Cox; Lip-Sync for Your Legacy Winner: BenDeLaCreme; Bottom Three: Kennedy Davenport, Shangela, and Trixie Mattel; Returned: Morgan McMichaels; Quit: BenDeLaCreme; Farewell Message: "Dear new top 5, thank you so much for this incredible journey. Stay fierce. You all deserve a crown. Your friendship and respect is the best win I can imagine. XO BDLC"
22	7	"My Best Squirrelfriend's Dragsmaids Wedding Trip"	March 8, 2018
At the beginning of the episode, BeBe Zahara Benet does not reveal who she would have chosen to return or to eliminate from the competition, had she won the lip-sync. For this week's main challenge, the queens will star in a raunchy girl comedy blockbuster.: BeBe Zahara Benet plays The Queen; Kennedy Davenport plays La La; Morgan McMichaels plays Beige Swan; Shangela plays Actavia; Trixie Mattel plays Sharon Frockovich; On the runway, category is Red for Filth. Shangela and Trixie Mattel receive positive critiques, and are announced as the top two. BeBe Zahara Benet, Kennedy Davenport and Morgan McMichaels receive negative critiques, and are announced as the bottom three. Shangela and Trixie Mattel lip-sync to "Freaky Money" by RuPaul ft. Big Freedia. Shangela wins the lip-sync and decides to eliminate Morgan McMichaels from the competition.: Guest Judges: Chris Colfer and Garcelle Beauvais; Alternating Judge: Ross Mathews; Main Challenge: Star in the raunchy girl comedy blockbuster "My Best Squirrelfriend's Dragsmaids Wedding Trip"; Runway Theme: Red for Filth; Top Two: Shangela and Trixie Mattel; Challenge Prize: A $1,000 gift card to Elea's Closet and a luggage set from Radden Luggage; Lip-Sync Song: "Freaky Money" by RuPaul ft. Big Freedia; Lip-Sync for Your Legacy Winner: Shangela; Bottom Three: BeBe Zahara Benet, Kennedy Davenport, and Morgan McMichaels; Eliminated: Morgan McMichaels; Farewell Message: "Let no one dim your light. I love you all totally! SISTERS FOREVER! 💋"
23	8	"A Jury of Their Queers"	March 15, 2018
At the beginning of the episode, Trixie Mattel reveals that she would have sent home Morgan McMichaels from the competition, had she won the lip-sync. For the final challenge of the season, the queens will write, record, and perform their own verses to RuPaul's song "Kitty Girl". On the runway, category is Best Drag Eleganza Extravaganza. RuPaul then reveals that the eliminated queens will be voting for who they want to see in the top two. BeBe Zahara Benet and Shangela receive the fewest votes, and are subsequently eliminated, leaving Kennedy Davenport and Trixie Mattel as the top two queens of the season. They lip-sync to "Wrecking Ball" by Miley Cyrus. It is revealed that Trixie Mattel is the winner, leaving Kennedy Davenport as the runner-up.: Main Challenge: Write, record, and perform their own verses to RuPaul's song "Kitty Girl"; Runway Theme: Best Drag Eleganza Extravaganza; Eliminated: BeBe Zahara Benet and Shangela; Final Two: Kennedy Davenport and Trixie Mattel; Lip Sync Song: "Wrecking Ball" by Miley Cyrus; Runner-up: Kennedy Davenport; Winner of RuPaul's Drag Race All Stars Season Three: Trixie Mattel

== Leak ==
On February 15, 2018, the series production company World of Wonder filed a lawsuit against an anonymous leaker using the alias RealityTVLeaks. According to the lawsuit, RealityTVLeaks posted several visuals from the season on various social media websites such as Reddit, Twitter, and Instagram before each episode's airing—including runway themes, challenges, episode titles, and eliminated queens. Additionally, a producer from the show stated that the leaker removed "information identifying [World of Wonder] as the copyright owner and author" before adding "misleading copyright management information falsely identifying [the defendants] as the copyright owners and authors." World of Wonder launched the suit because of the defendant's "unlawful theft and public dissemination of episodes of the popular and critically-acclaimed reality television show," and the production company confirmed it is seeking damages of $300,000, including $150,000 for each infringed episode and $25,000 per violation of "actual damages" and defendants' profits.

== Ratings ==
Viewership and ratings per episode of RuPaul's Drag Race All Stars season 3
No.	Title	Air date	Rating (18–49)	Viewers (millions)
1	"All-Star Variety Show"	January 25, 2018	0.46	0.895
2	"Divas Lip Sync Live"	February 1, 2018	0.40	0.777
3	"The Bitchelor"	February 8, 2018	0.39	0.738
4	"All Stars Snatch Game"	February 15, 2018	0.34	0.713
5	"Pop Art Ball"	February 22, 2018	0.38	0.732
6	"Handmaids to Kitty Girls"	March 1, 2018	0.49	0.883
7	"My Best Squirrelfriend's Dragsmaids Wedding Trip"	March 8, 2018	0.31	0.658
8	"A Jury of Their Queers"	March 15, 2018	0.27	0.589

== Critical reception ==
Although a ratings success, the season was panned by the critics. Vulture, in writing a summation review, described the season as "truly one of the roughest seasons of the show ever. After a stellar, jaw-unhingingly good All Stars 2, this season felt more like an embarrassing cousin you brought to gay happy hour who wears double polos", while specifying that "even at its worst, it's still one of the best, if not the best goddamn reality competition show on television".

The A.V. Club similarly described the season as disappointing, writing in the final review of the season: "I should be celebrating the crowning of a new queen in the Drag Race hall of fame, but Drag Race All Stars season three has left me feeling totally underwhelmed and wondering, What's the point?"
