= Pop Art Ball =

2018 American television episode

- RuPaul's Drag Race All Stars episode
- Episode no.: Season 3 Episode 5
- Presented by: RuPaul
- Original air date: February 22, 2018

Guest appearances
- Tituss Burgess; Shay Mitchell

"Pop Art Ball" is the fifth episode of the third season of the American television series RuPaul's Drag Race All Stars. It originally aired on February 22, 2018. The episode's main challenge tasks the contestants with creating two looks for the Pop Art Ball; one is a wearable soup can inspired by American artist and filmmaker Andy Warhol, and the other is a Studio 54-inspired disco look. Tituss Burgess and Shay Mitchell are guest judges.

Aja is eliminated from the competition by BeBe Zahara Benet, who places in the top two of the main challenge and wins a lip-sync contest against Trixie Mattel to "The Boss" (1979) by Diana Ross.

== Episode ==
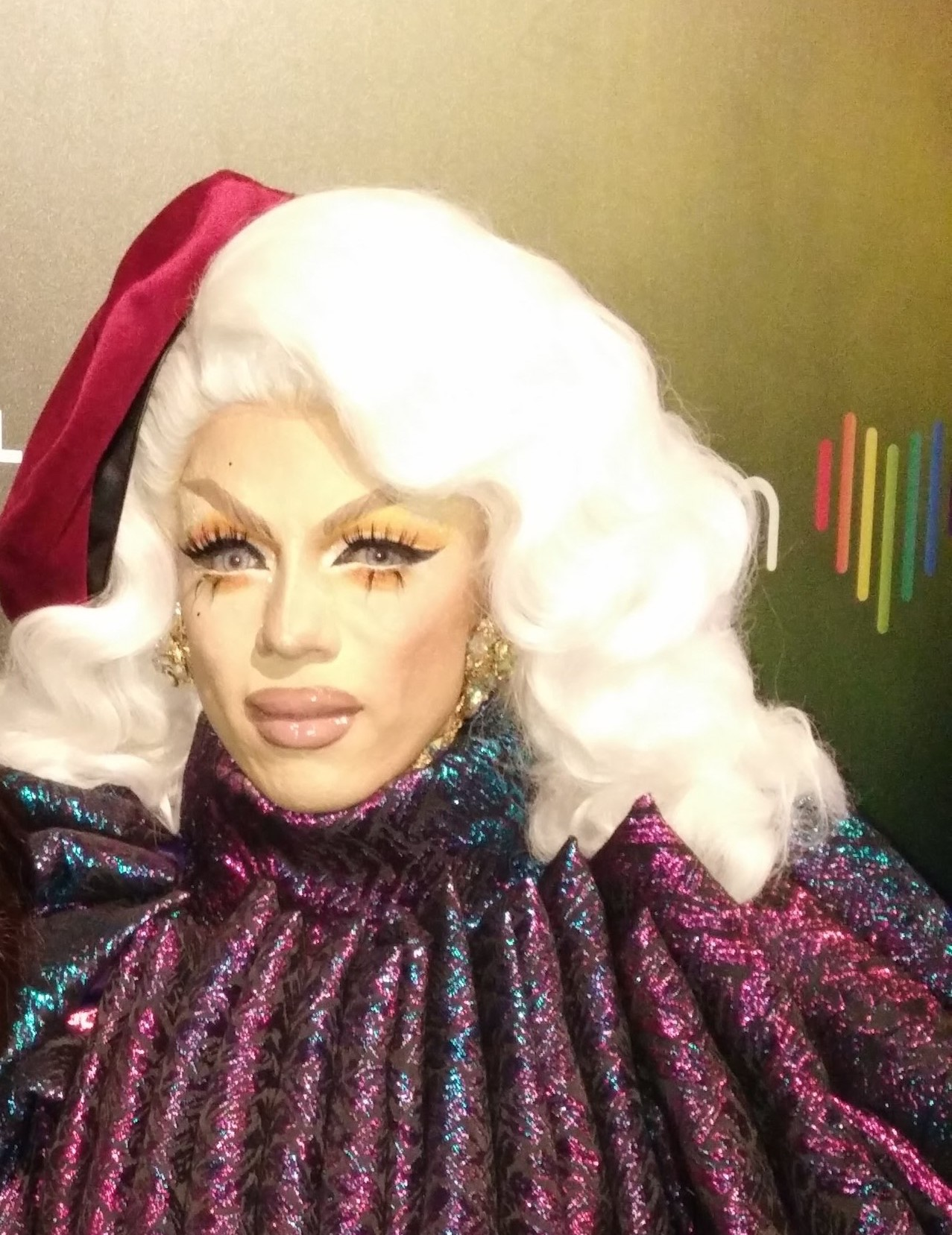
Aja (pictured in 2018) is eliminated from the competition.

The contestants return to the workroom after Chi Chi DeVayne's elimination on the previous episode. On a new day, RuPaul greets the group and reveals the mini-challenge, which tasks the contestants with participating in a pop art-style portrait photo shoot. Aja is declared the winner of the mini-challenge. RuPaul then reveals the main challenge, which tasks the contestants with creating two looks for the Pop Art Ball: a wearable soup can inspired by Andy Warhol and a Studio 54-inspired disco look. The contestants start to work on their outfits.

On elimination day, the contestants make final preparations and discuss how they will eliminate fellow competitors. On the main stage, RuPaul welcomes fellow judges Michelle Visage and Ross Mathews, as well as guest judges Tituss Burgess and Shay Mitchell. RuPaul shares the assignment of the main challenge and the runway categories. After the contestants present their looks, the judges deliver their critiques, then share the results with the group. BeBe Zahara Benet and Trixie Mattel are declared the top two contestants. Aja and Shangela receive negative critiques and are announced as the bottom two contestants. The contestants deliberate in the workroom, then BeBe Zahara Benet and Trixie Mattel face off in a lip-sync contest on the main stage to "The Boss" (1979) by Diana Ross. BeBe Zahara Benet wins the lip-sync and decides to eliminate Aja from the competition. Aja returns to the workroom to leave a message on the mirror for the remaining contestants. She sees a video message from RuPaul, then Alaska and Chad Michaels appear behind her. On the main stage, RuPaul asks Alaska and Chad Michaels how many contestants they were able to "capture". Three other people dressed as handmaids enter the stage, then the text "To be continued..." closes out the episode.

== Production and broadcast ==
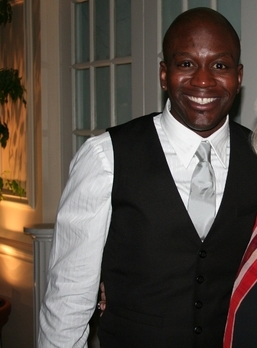
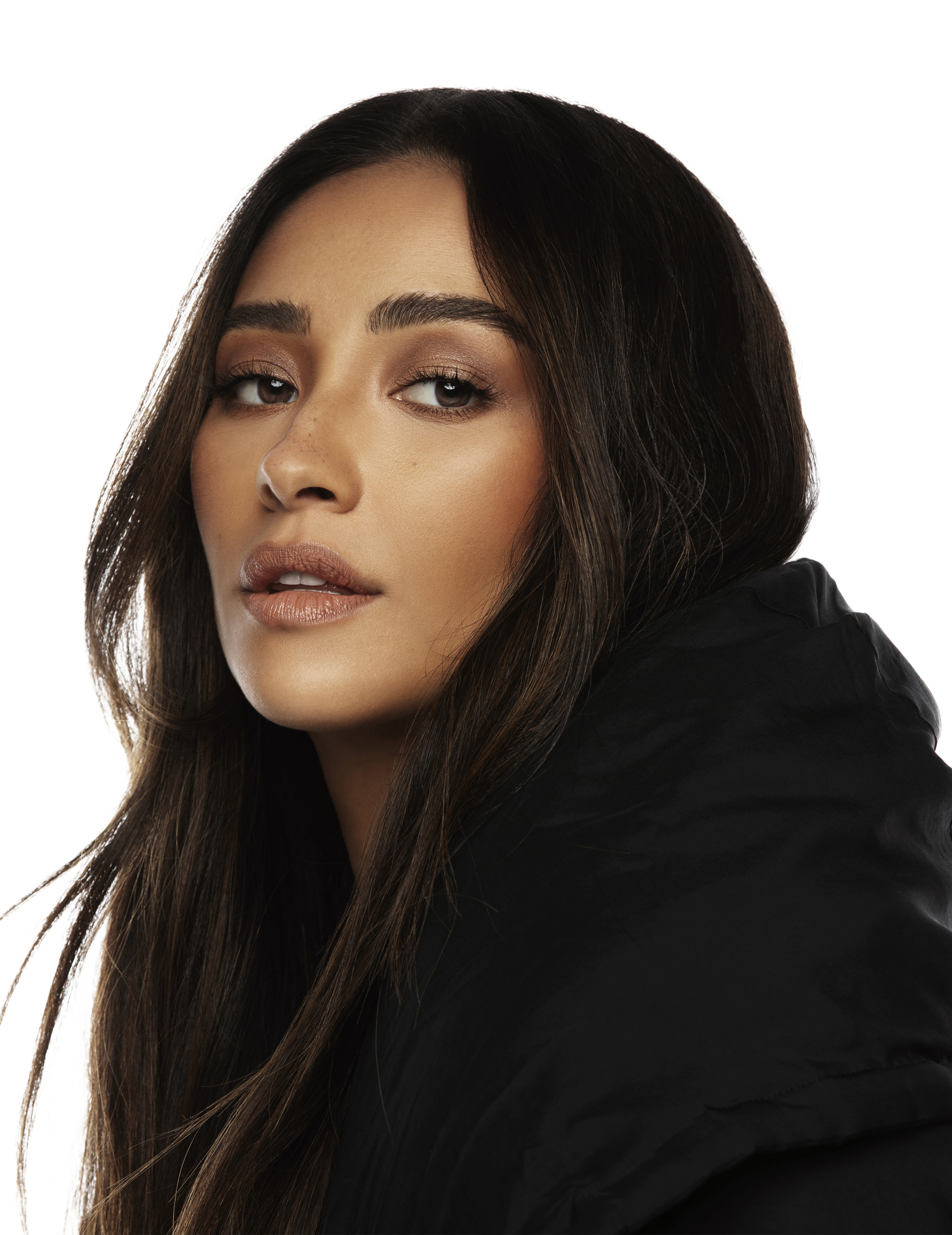
Tituss Burgess (left) and Shay Mitchell (right) are guest judges.

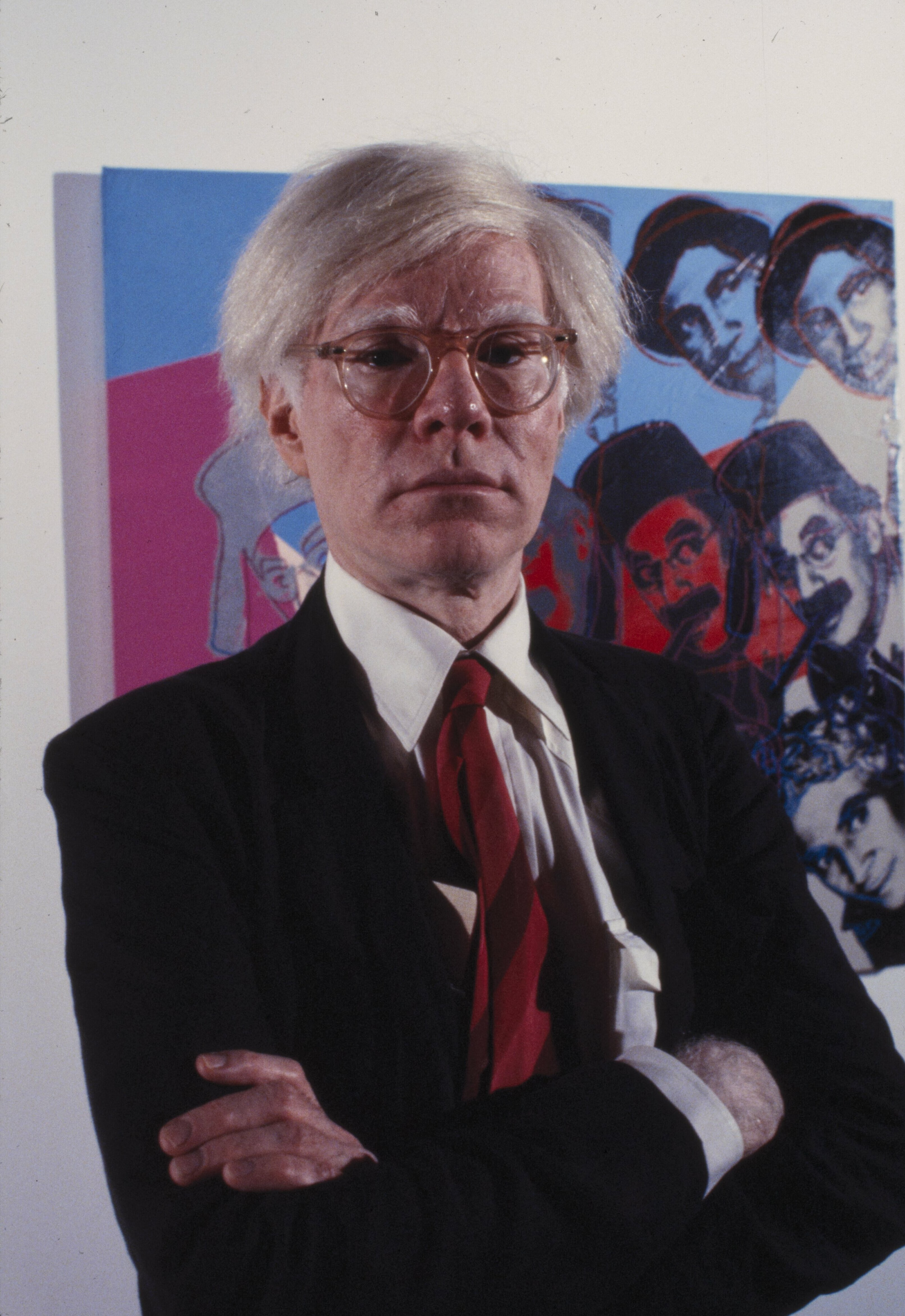
The episode has a challenge inspired by American artist and filmmaker Andy Warhol.

The episode originally aired on February 22, 2018.

BeBe Zahara Benet eliminates Aja even after she received help from Aja.

=== Fashion ===
In the workroom, RuPaul wears a maroon suit, a blue polo neck, sunglasses, and a blonde wig reminiscent of Warhol's hair. For the main stage, RuPaul wears a purple-and-silver dress with purple earrings, a large blonde wig, and a red fascinator.

For the fashion show's "Soup Can Realness" category, Aja wears a "Sugar Tits" soup can and a blue wig. Shangela has a "Halleloops" soup can and a dark wig. Trixie Mattel wears a "Pep/Abysmal" soup can and a pink wig. Kennedy Davenport has a "Pot Licka' Juice" soup can and a dark wig. BeBe Zahara Benet wears a "ZaZa" soup can and a dark wig. BenDeLaCreme has a "Cream de la Creme" soup can and a dark wig.

For the "Disco Queen Eleganza Extravaganza" category, Aja wears a gold-and-white outfit with fringe, a white headband, and a blonde wig. Shangela has a gold outfit, silver high-heeled shoes, a large wig, and a headpiece. Trixie Mattel wears a pink outfit with a matching headband and a blonde wig. Kennedy Davenport has a short green outfit, large hoop earrings, and a large brown wig. BeBe Zahara Benet wears a blue-and-purple dress and a dark wig. BenDeLaCreme has a short bodysuit, large hoop earrings, and a dark wig.

For the lip-sync contest, BeBe Zahara Benet wears a gold-and-purple dress and a large wig. Trixie Mattel has a pink-and-white-checkered bodysuit with fringe, white gloves and matching cowboy boots, a large blonde wig, and a fascinator.

== Reception ==
Oliver Sava of The A.V. Club gave the episode a rating of 'C'. Writing for Vulture, Matt Rogers and Bowen Yang rated the episode three out of five stars. Kevin O'Keeffe of INTO Magazine wrote, "That lip sync was a thrilling moment for Bebe, featuring a perfect Diana impersonation." Phillip Henry of Pride.com called the lip-sync contest "boring".

== See also ==
- Campbell's Soup Cans
- Campbell's Soup I (1968)
- Campbell's Soup II (1969)
