= All-Star Variety Show =

2018 American television episode

- RuPaul's Drag Race All Stars episode
- Episode no.: Season 3 Episode 1
- Presented by: RuPaul
- Original air date: January 25, 2018

Guest appearance
- Vanessa Hudgens

"All-Star Variety Show" is the first episode of the third season of the American television series RuPaul's Drag Race All Stars. It originally aired on January 25, 2018. The episode's main challenge tasks the contestants with performing in a variety show. American actress and singer Vanessa Hudgens is a guest judge. Aja and BenDeLaCreme are the winners of the main challenge. Morgan McMichaels is eliminated from the competition after placing in the bottom and being voted out by BenDeLaCreme, who won the lip-sync against Aja to "Anaconda" (2014) by Nicki Minaj.

== Episode ==
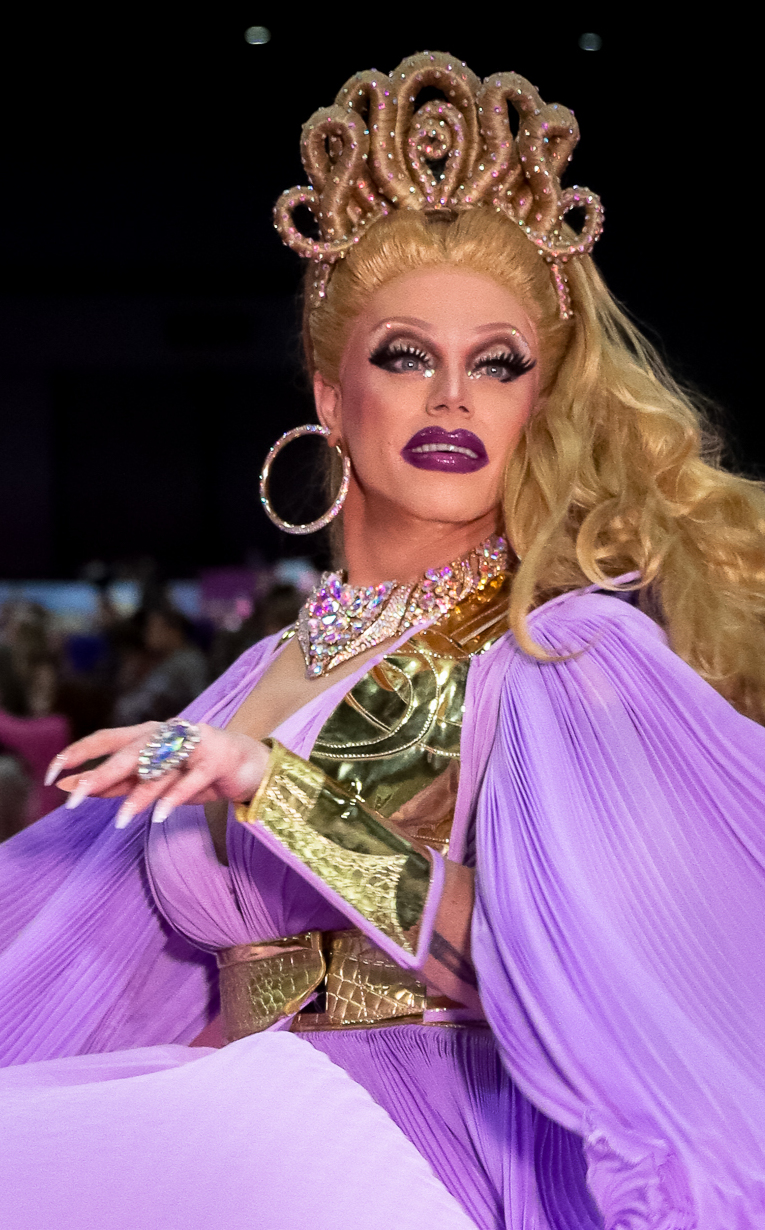
Morgan McMichaels (pictured in 2023) is eliminated from the competition by BenDeLaCreme.

The episode begins with Drag Race Hall of Fame members Alaska and Chad Michaels walking and talking while dressed like handmaids from The Handmaid's Tale. Nine former contestants of RuPaul's Drag Race enter the workroom. RuPaul greets and welcomes the group, then invites BeBe Zahara Benet, who won the first season of RuPaul's Drag Race, as join as the tenth contestant. RuPaul explains the rules of the competition, then reveals the first mini-challenge, which tasks the contestants with "reading" (or playfully insulting) each other. BenDeLaCreme wins the mini-challenge. RuPaul reveals the main challenge, which tasks the contestants with performing in a variety show for the judges and a live audience.

The contestants get out of drag and get acquainted. Morgan McMichaels shares her plan to eliminate the strongest competitors. On a new day, the contestants prepare for the variety show. On the main stage, RuPaul welcomes fellow judges Michelle Visage, Carson Kressley, and Ross Mathews, as well as guest judge Vanessa Hudgens. RuPaul shares the assignment of the main challenge, then the variety show commences. Following are the acts:

- Shangela - lip-syncing
- BeBe Zahara Benet - lip-syncing and African tribal dancing
- Thorgy Thor - violin
- Aja - lip-syncing and dancing
- BenDeLaCreme - burlesque
- Chi Chi DeVayne - baton twirling
- Kennedy Davenport - dancing
- Milk - singing
- Morgan McMichaels - lip-syncing
- Trixie Mattel - autoharp and singing

The judges deliver their critiques, then share the results with the group. Aja and BenDeLaCreme the top two contestants. Chi Chi DeVayne and Morgan McMichaels are the bottom two contestants. The contestants deliberate backstage. Meanwhile, Hudgens and a pork chop "face off" in a lip-sync contest to "Cover Girl". RuPaul declares Hudgens the winner. Aja and BenDeLaCreme face off in a lip-sync contest to "Anaconda" (2014) by Nicki Minaj. BenDeLaCreme wins the lip-sync and decides to eliminate Morgan McMichaels from the competition. RuPaul leaves Morgan McMichaels a cryptic video message, then Alaska and Chad Michaels appear behind Morgan McMichaels in the workroom.

== Production and broadcast ==
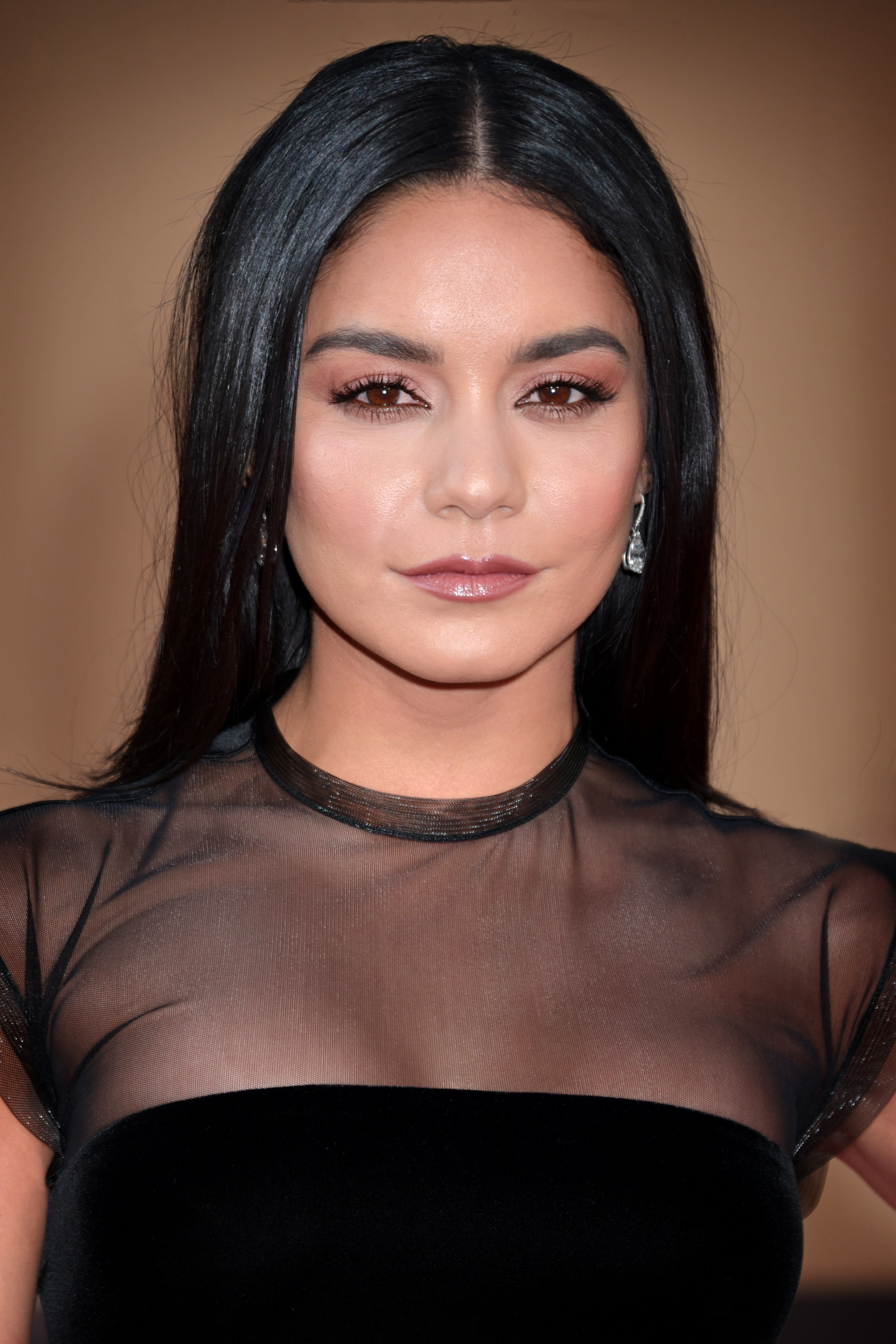
Vanessa Hudgens (pictured in 2019) is a guest judge.

The episode originally aired on January 25, 2018.

Hudgens was previously a guest judge on an episode of RuPaul's Drag Race.

=== Fashion ===
For her entrance look, Trixie Mattel wears a pink outfit and a large blonde wig. She is on rollerblades and has a fanny pack. Milk wears a primarily blue Pinocchio-inspired outfit with a short blonde wig. Chi Chi DeVayne has a short yellow dress with matching high-heeled shoes and hat. Thorgy Thor wears a colorful outfit and a red wig. Morgan McMichaels has a pink-and-red dress and a brown wig. Aja wears a blue-and pink outfit with pink high-heels and a yellow wig. BenDeLaCreme has a pink-and-yellow dress repurposed from one she wore on the show previously. She wears large earrings and a dark wig. Kennedy Davenport has a yellow-and-silver dress with many small mirrors. She carries a disco ball and has an eye mask with mirrors. Shangela emerges from a box in a short light blue dress, a long blonde wig, and a large bow.

In the workroom, RuPaul wears a red suit. For the main stage, RuPaul has a pink dress and a large blonde wig. For the talent show, Shangela wears a bodysuit with an animal print, tall black boots, and a large brown wig. BeBe Zahara Benet has a colorful dress with a large collar and a large dark wig. She removes part of the dress to reveal many feathers underneath. Thorgy Thor wears a sparkly white jumpsuit and a large blonde wig. Aja has a blue-and-pink jacket, which she removes, as well as tall white boots and a light purple wig. Kennedy Davenport wears a black-and-purple outfit with an animal print, as well as tall black boots. BenDeLaCreme removes her nightgown to reveal a corset and series of bras and tassels. She also has a dark wig and a fascinator. Chi Chi DeVayne has a black-and-green outfit with fringe and sequins. She wears flat shoes and a dark wig. Morgan McMichaels has a sparkly outfit with black feathers and a blonde wig. Trixie Mattel wears a pink-and-white outfit with fringe and a blonde wig. Milk resembles a doll and "attaches" pieces of clothing to her body. She has a collar and a dark wig.

== Reception ==
Writing for Vulture, Matt Rogers and Bowen Yang rated the episode five out of five stars. Bernardo Sim ranked the "Anaconda" performance eleventh in Out magazine's 2025 list of the shows 30 best lip-sync contests.

== See also ==
- List of Vanessa Hudgens performances
