= All Star Talent Show Extravaganza =

Episode of RuPaul's Drag Race All Stars

- RuPaul's Drag Race All Stars episode
- Episode no.: Season 2 Episode 1
- Presented by: RuPaul
- Original air date: August 25, 2016

Guest appearance
- Raven-Symoné (guest judge)

Episode chronology
← Previous "The Grand Finale"	Next → "All Stars Snatch Game"
- RuPaul's Drag Race All Stars season 2

"All Star Talent Show Extravaganza" is the first episode of the second season of the American television series RuPaul's Drag Race All Stars. It originally aired on August 25, 2016. The episode's main challenge tasks the contestants with performing in a talent show. Raven-Symoné is a guest judge. Coco Montrese is eliminated from the competition by Roxxxy Andrews, who places in the top two of the main challenge and beats Tatianna in a lip-sync contest to "Shake It Off" (2014) by Taylor Swift.

== Episode ==
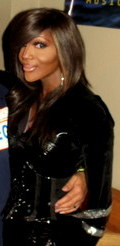
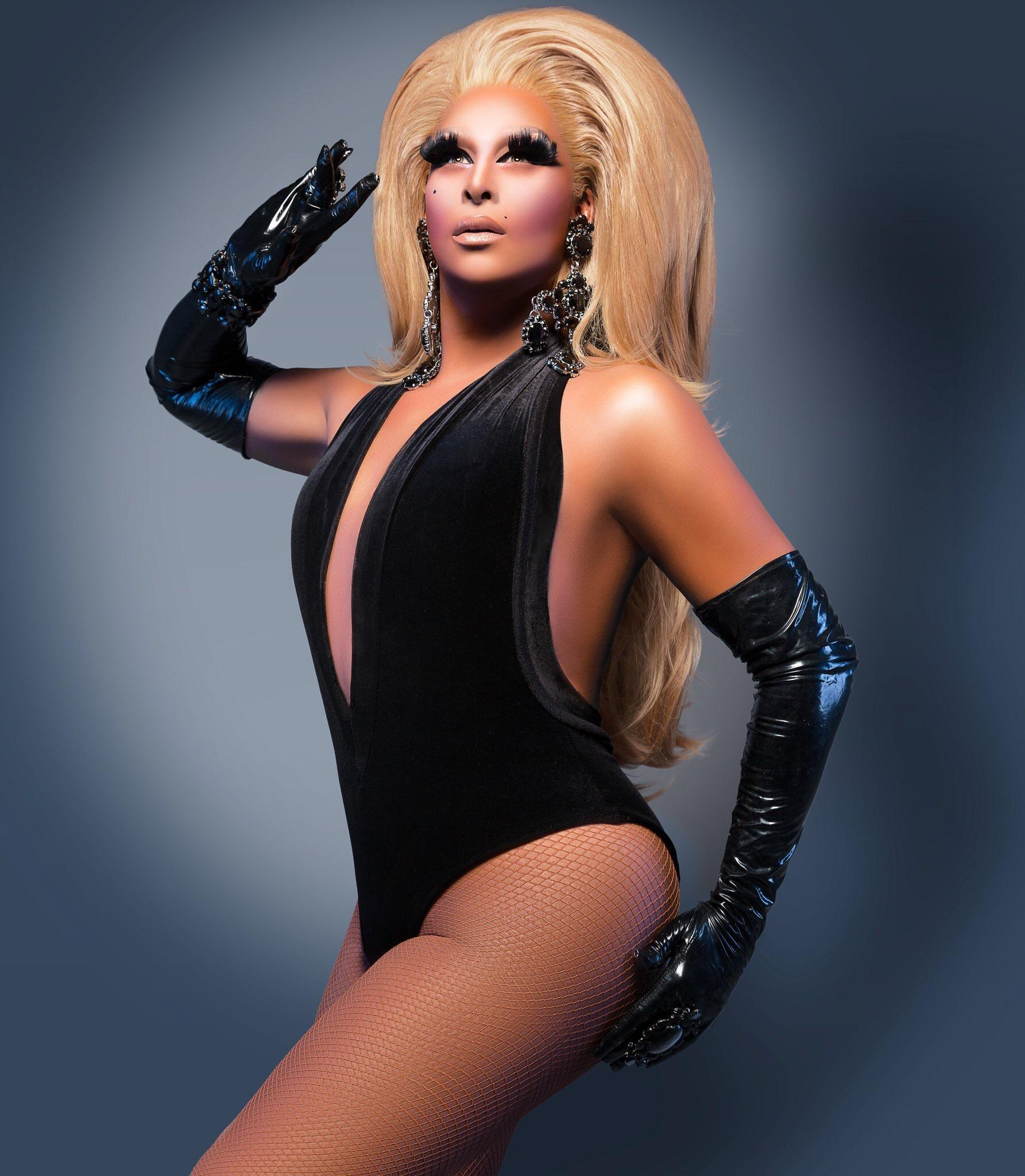
Coco Montrese (left, pictured in 2014) is eliminated from the competition by Roxxxy Andrews (right), who places in the top two of the main challenge and wins the episode's lip-sync contest.

Ten contestants enter the workroom. RuPaul greets the group and reveals that the judges will not be eliminating contestants this season. RuPaul then reveals the first mini-challenge, which tasks the contestants with "reading" (or playfully insulting) each other. Alaska wins the mini-challenge. RuPaul reveals the main challenge, which tasks the contestants with performing in a talent show for the judges and a live audience.

The contestants get out of drag and set up their work stations. While making preparations for the talent show, the contestants discuss their motivations for returning to the competition. On the main stage, RuPaul welcomes fellow judges Michelle Visage, Carson Kressley, and Todrick Hall, as well as guest judge Raven-Symoné. RuPaul shares the main challenge assignment, then the talent show commences. Following are the contestants and acts:

- Adore Delano – live singing
- Alyssa Edwards – variety (puppetry, lip-syncing, dancing)
- Coco Montrese – dancing
- Detox – live singing
- Ginger Minj – live singing
- Katya – gymnastics
- Phi Phi O'Hara – live singing (a capella)
- Roxxxy Andrews – burlesque
- Alaska – live singing
- Tatianna – spoken word ("The Same Parts")

After the performances, RuPaul reminds the contestants that she will not be eliminating anyone. She then reveals that the contestants will be eliminating each other. RuPaul explains that the top two contestants of the main challenge will Lip-Sync for Your Legacy. The winner of the lip-sync contest will then choose someone in the bottom to eliminate from the competition. RuPaul sends the three safe contestants to the back of the stage, then the judges deliver their critiques. Roxxxy Andrews and Tatianna are announced as the top two contestants. Adore Delano, Coco Montrese, and Phi Phi O'Hara are announced as the bottom three contestants. In the workroom, the contestants discuss the competition's rules and possible strategies. Adore Delano admits she is struggling with the competition's expectations and format. The top two contestants cast their votes. Back on the main stage, Roxxxy Andrews and Tatianna face off in a lip-sync contest to "Shake It Off" (2014) by Taylor Swift. Roxxxy Andrews wins the lip-sync and decides to eliminate Coco Montrese from the competition. Coco Montrese returns to the workroom to write a message on the mirror using lipstick for the remaining contestants.

== Production and broadcast ==
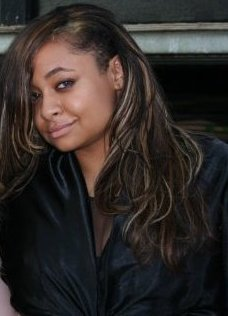
Raven-Symoné (pictured in 2010) is a guest judge.

The episode originally aired on August 25, 2016.

Adore Delano's original song "I Can't Love You" appeared on her 2016 studio album After Party. Timothy Allen of Queerty described Tatianna's spoken word piece "provocative". Tatianna subsequently released a dance remix for "The Same Parts". Joe Lynch of Billboard described "The Same Parts" as a "parody piece" and said the recorded remix has "stretchy synths and a brittle 808 beat". Lynch included the remix in the magazine's 2019 list of the 20 best songs by Drag Race contestants.

=== Fashion ===
For her entrance look, Katya wears a Russia-inspired red outfit, an eyepatch, and a blonde wig. Detox has a short blue dress with yellow accents, as well as yellow high-heeled shoes, large earrings, and a blonde wig. Alyssa Edwards wears a black dress with a cape and a large yellow bow in her dark hair. Phi Phi O'Hara wears a Riddler-inspired green-and-purple outfit with a matching hat and a red wig. Ginger Minj has a black-and-gold outfit with a cape, which she removes. She has a large red wig. Roxxxy Andrews wears a black dress with matching high-heels. Coco Montrese has a short black dress and a matching hat with a long feather. She carries a large Doritos chip as a prop. Alaska has a black dress with a matching bow in her blonde wig. She carries a black umbrella with a yellow spiral. Tatiana has a short black-and-gold skirt with gold high-heels. She has a long dark wig and carries a black handbag. Adore Delano wears a grunge-inspired outfit with plaid and a denim jacket lined with an animal print. She has large hoop earrings and a braided wig.

== Reception ==
Brian Moylan of Vulture rated the episode four out of five stars. Min Ji Park included Raven-Symoné in Screen Rant's 2022 list of the show's ten worst judges, according to Reddit, writing: "In the infamous episode of All-Stars 2 that led to Adore Delano quitting the race, Symoné was seen as too harsh in her critiques and a factor in Delano’s decision to leave... While the episode is considered one of the best episodes of All-Stars, Symoné certainly did not come off well." In 2025, Bernardo Sim of Out called Tatianna's talent show performance "legendary" and a "whacky (but brilliant) concept".
