= HERstory of the World =

- RuPaul's Drag Race All Stars episode
- Episode no.: Season 2 Episode 3
- Presented by: RuPaul
- Original air date: September 8, 2016

Guest appearance
- Jeremy Scott (guest judge)

Episode chronology
← Previous "All Stars Snatch Game"	Next → "Drag Movie Shequels"
- RuPaul's Drag Race All Stars season 2

"HERstory of the World" is the third episode of the second season of the American television series RuPaul's Drag Race All Stars. It originally aired on September 8, 2016. The episode's main challenge tasks the contestants with performing in a Rusical (musical theatre production) about notable women in history. American fashion designer Jeremy Scott is a guest judge. Ginger Minj is eliminated from the competition by Alyssa Edwards, who places among the top two contestants of the main challenge and wins a lip-sync against Detox to "Tell It to My Heart" (1987) by Taylor Dayne.

== Episode ==
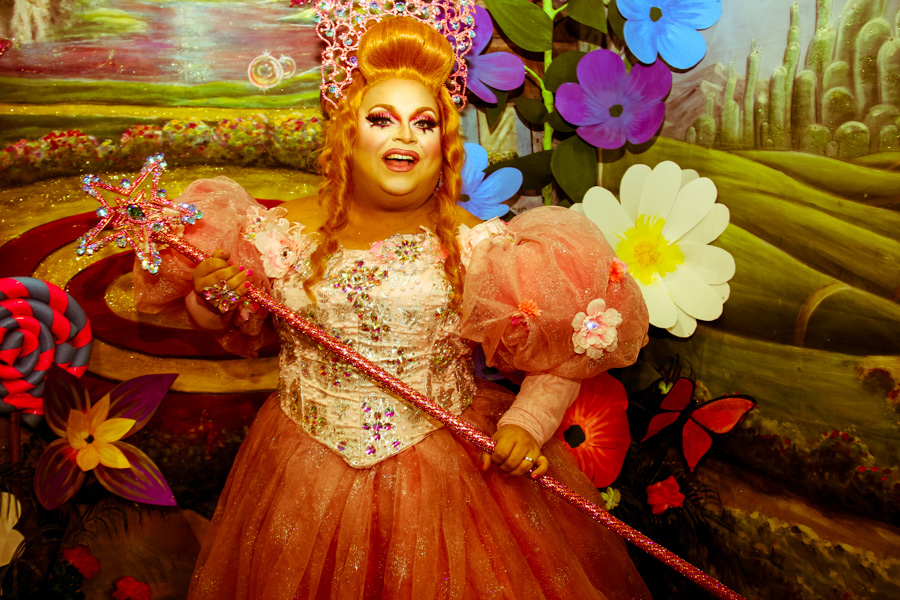
Ginger Minj (pictured at RuPaul's DragCon LA in 2018) is eliminated from the competition by Alyssa Edwards.

The contestants return to the workroom after Tatianna's elimination on the previous episode. Alaska shares why she eliminated Tatianna from the competition. On a new day, RuPaul greets the group and reveals the main challenge, which tasks the contestants with performing in a Rusical (musical theatre production) about women in history. RuPaul shares who each contestants will portray, then reveals that they will be rehearsing choreography with Ant and Ash of The Squared Division.

The contestants start to prepare for the Rusical in the workroom, then rehearse on the main stage. On elimination day, the contestants make final preparations in the workroom. Phi Phi O'Hara talks about the impact of her previous appearance on Drag Race and the negativity directed at her. On the main stage, RuPaul welcomes fellow judges Michelle Visage, Carson Kressley, and Todrick Hall, as well as guest judge Jeremy Scott. RuPaul shares the assignment of the main challenge and the runway category ("The Future of Drag"), then the Rusical commences.

For the Rusical, Alaska Thunderfuck, Alyssa Edwards, Detox, Ginger Minj, and Roxxxy Andrews portray a Britney Spears-inspired Eve, Annie Oakley, Marie Antoinette, Catherine the Great, and Eva Peron respectively. Katya portrays Princess Diana, and Phi Phi O'Hara portrays Helen of Troy. The fashion show commences. After the contestants present their looks, the judges deliver their critiques. RuPaul announces that Alyssa Edwards and Detox are the top two contestants. Ginger Minj and Katya are the bottom two contestants. The contestants deliberate in the workroom, then Alyssa Edwards and Detox face off in a lip-sync contest to "Tell It to My Heart" (1987) by Taylor Dayne. Alyssa Edwards wins the lip-sync and decides to eliminate Ginger Minj from the competition. Ginger Minj returns to the workroom, where she is surprised by a video of RuPaul saying she has a chance to return to the competition.

== Production and broadcast ==
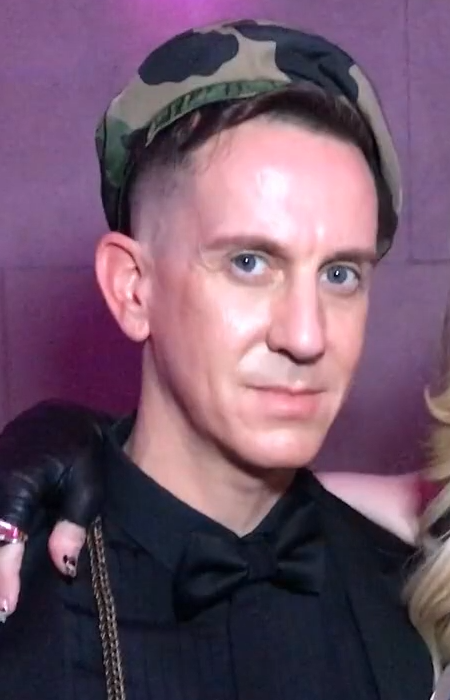
American fashion designer Jeremy Scott (pictured) is a guest judge.

The episode originally aired on September 8, 2016. It was the season's first hour-long episode and features the first Rusical on All Stars.

"Herstory" refers to the history of Drag Race. As of early 2021, the Rusical was among the top five most-watched RuPaul's Drag Race performances of all time on YouTube, with approximately 4.5 million views.

Visage makes an appearance at the start of the Rusical.

=== Fashion ===
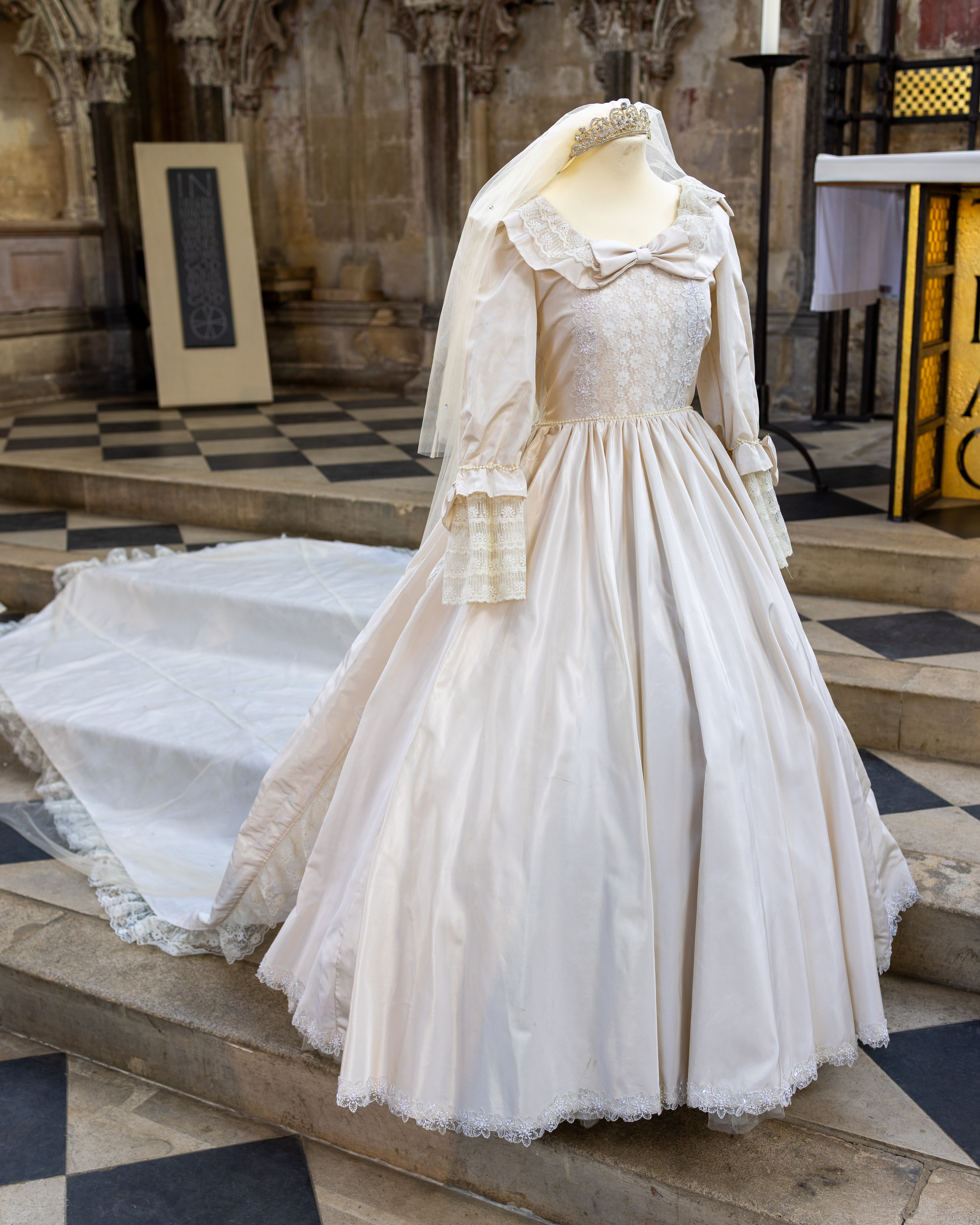
Katya's dress in the Rusical is inspired by the wedding dress of Lady Diana Spencer (replica of displayed in 2024).

In the workroom, RuPaul wears a light blue suit and a white dress shirt with matching shoes. On the main stage, RuPaul wears a long blue dress and a blonde wig. For the Rusical, Alaska has a stuffed snake wrapped around her and a long wig. Phi Phi O'Hara has a gold-and-pink outfit and she carries an electric guitar. Ginger Minj has a heavy dress and a crown. She carries a horse head on a cane as a prop. Detox has a pink-and-yellow dress and a large yellow wig. She carries a hand fan. Alyssa Edwards has Western wear and a large blonde wig. She carries a bedazzled fake gun as a prop. Roxxxy Andrews has a dress with matching high-heeled shoes, pearl necklaces, and a blonde wig. Katya wears a long white wedding dress (referencing the wedding dress of Lady Diana Spencer), pearl necklaces, a tiara, and a short blonde wig.

For the fashion show, Alaska wears a short blue dress and a matching wig. She has white high-heels and long nails. Phi Phi O'Hara has a blue-and-gold alien-inspired look and she carries a large fake laser gun. Ginger Minj has a silver outfit and a red wig. Detox has a revealing silver outfit and a bald cap. She has applied cosmetics to make her body's skin silver. Alyssa Edwards has a black-and-silver outfit with a beaded wig and a headpiece. Roxxxy Andrews has a warrior-inspired black-and-silver outfit. Katya has a black-and-silver outfit with a large dark wig.

== Reception ==
Oliver Sava of The A.V. Club gave the episode a rating of 'A'. Writing for Vulture, Joel Kim Booster rated the episode four out of five stars. Stephen Daw of Billboard wrote, "While it was far from the first Rusical, HERstory of the World certainly helped cement the Rusical's status as a mainstay challenge on Drag Race, thanks to how exceedingly well it was executed." In 2020, Bernardo Sim of Screen Rant deemed the Rusical among the show's worst and said "HERstory of the World" was "messy". In 2024, Stephanie Koithan of the San Antonio Current wrote: "When Edwards joined the roster of the second season of Drag Race All Stars, America fell in love all over again, thanks to the chaotic energy Edwards brought to set. Who can forget the moment in the 'HERstory of the World' episode when a wigged-up and makeup-less Edwards brandished a toy gun and stalked the dressing room as a half-cocked Annie Oakley?"

== See also ==
- Cultural depictions of Eva Perón
- Cultural depictions of Marie Antoinette
- Fashion of Diana, Princess of Wales
