= All Stars Snatch Game =

- RuPaul's Drag Race All Stars episode
- Episode no.: Season 2 Episode 2
- Presented by: RuPaul
- Original air date: September 1, 2016

Guest appearances
- Ross Mathews (guest judge); Jujubee (guest celebrity); Raven (guest celebrity); Bianca Del Rio; Shangela

Episode chronology
← Previous "All Star Talent Show Extravaganza"	Next → "HERstory of the World"
- RuPaul's Drag Race All Stars season 2

"All Stars Snatch Game" is the second episode of the second season of the American television series RuPaul's Drag Race All Stars. It originally aired on September 1, 2016. The episode's main challenge tasks the contestants with impersonating celebrities in the Snatch Game.

Ross Mathews is a guest judge. Former Drag Race contestants Jujubee and Raven are guest celebrities for the Snatch Game. Bianca Del Rio appears in a video question during the main challenge and Shangela appears to be declared the game's "winner". Tatianna is eliminated from the competition by Alaska, who places in the top of the main challenge and wins a lip-sync contest against Katya to "Le Freak" (1978) by Chic.

== Episode ==
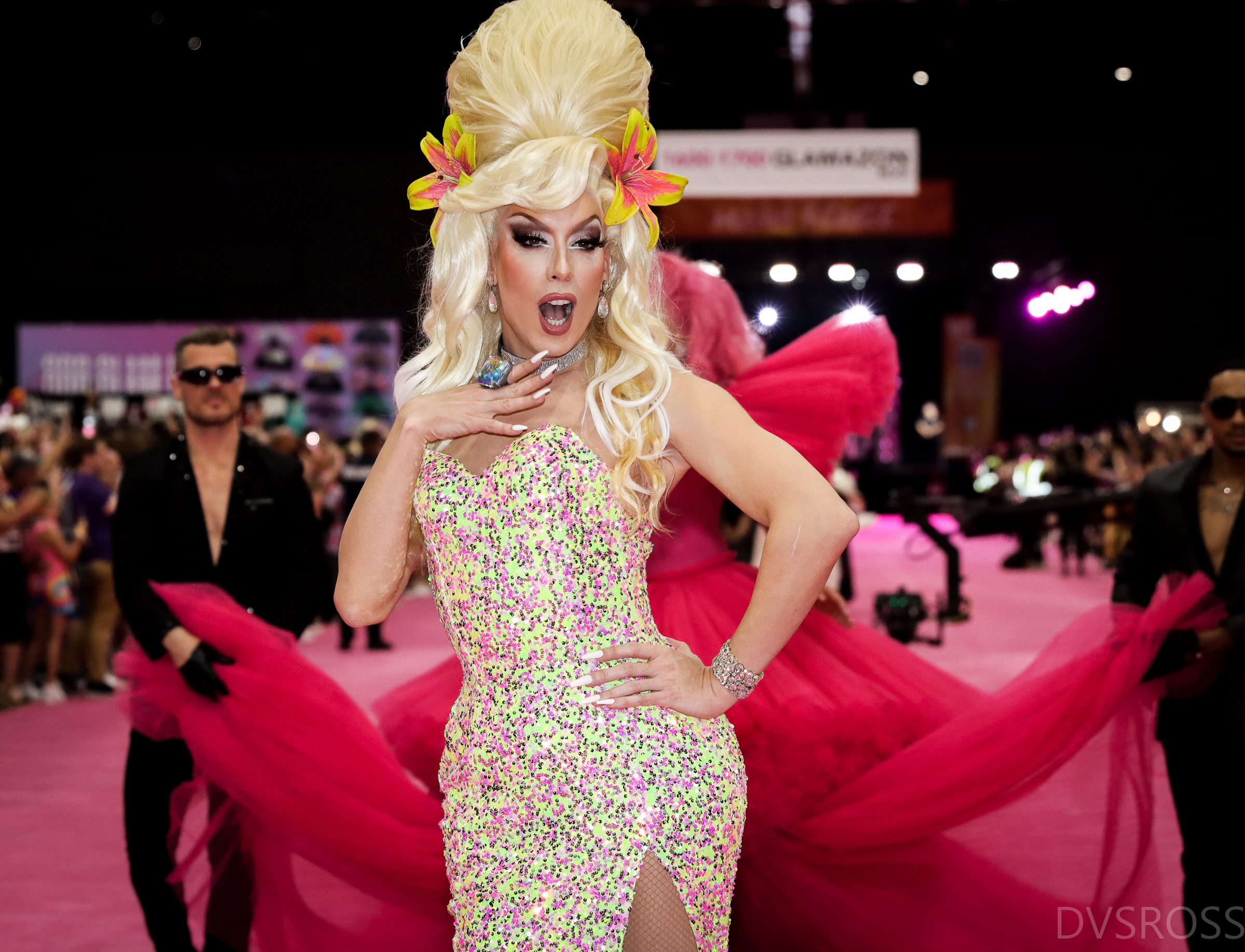
Alaska Thunderfuck (pictured at RuPaul's DragCon LA in 2024) wins the episode's lip-sync contest.

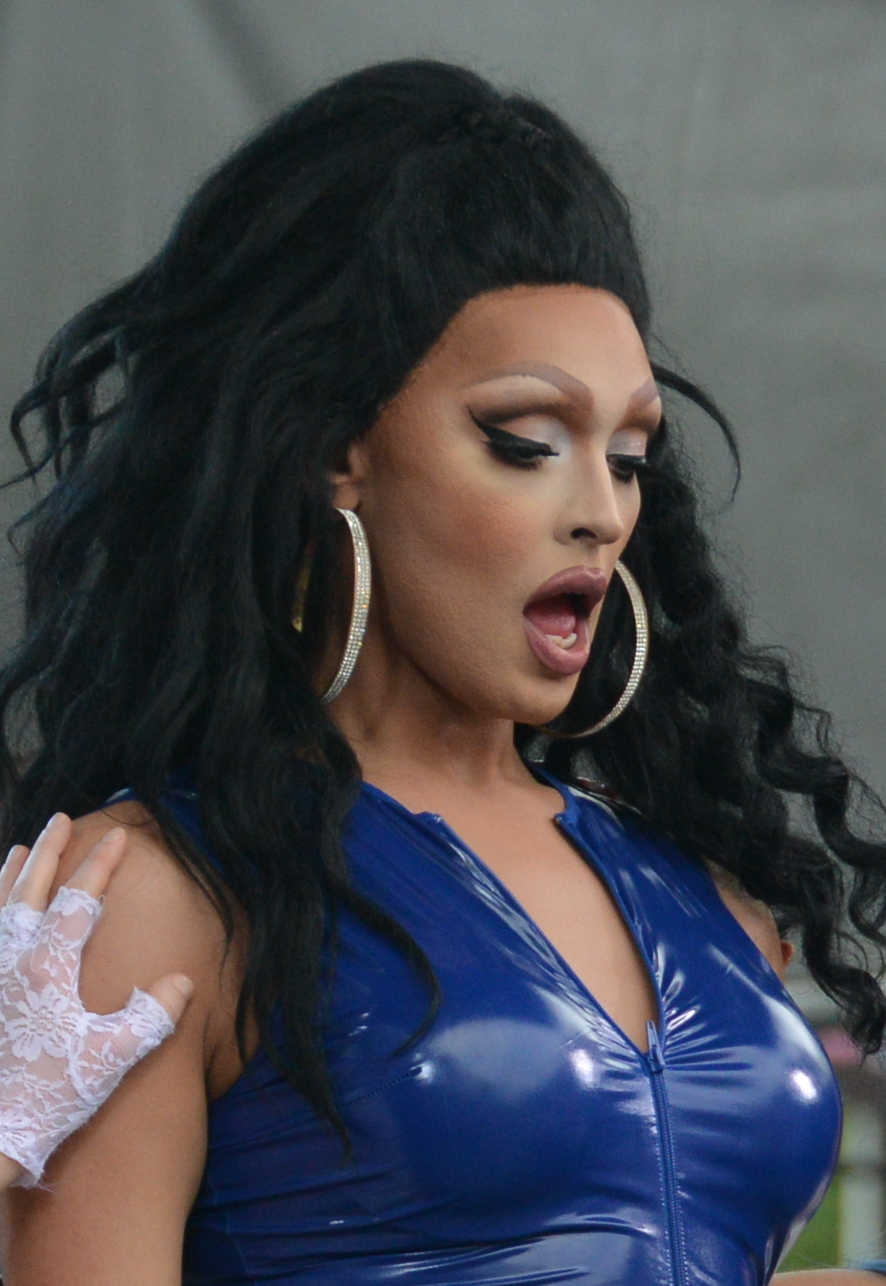
Tatianna (pictured in 2018) is eliminated from the competition.

The contestants return to the workroom after Coco Montrese's elimination on the previous episode. Tatianna reveals that she would have sent home Coco Montrese from the competition, had she won the lip-sync contest. On a new day, RuPaul greets the group and reveals the main challenge, which tasks the contestants with impersonating celebrities in the Snatch Game.

The contestants start to get ready for the Snatch Game. RuPaul returns to meet with each contestants individually, asking questions and offering advice. While speaking with RuPaul, Adore Delano says she wants to withdraw from the competition. RuPaul encourages her to stay and asks her to have a discussion with Michelle Visage about the judges' feedback. While RuPaul continues to meet the other contestants, Adore Delano has a discussion with Visage outside the studio. Adore Delano returns to the workroom and tells the other contestants that she has decided to leave. The contestants have a group hug and Adore Delano departs.

The Snatch Game commences, with RuPaul as the host and Jujubee and Raven as guest celebrities. Following is the cast:

- Alaska as Mae West
- Alyssa Edwards as Joan Crawford
- Detox as Nancy Grace
- Ginger Minj as Tammy Faye
- Katya as Björk
- Phi Phi O'Hara as Theresa Caputo
- Roxxxy Andrews as Alaska
- Tatianna as Ariana Grande

During the Snatch Game, Bianca Del Rio appears in a video question and Shangela shows up at the end to be declared the game's "winner". On elimination day, the contestants make final preparations for the latex-themed fashion show. The group talk about game strategy and playing with Jujubee and Raven. On the main stage, RuPaul welcomes fellow judges Visage, Carson Kressley, and Todrick Hall, as well as guest judge Ross Mathews. RuPaul shares the assignment of the main challenge and the runway category ("Latex Eleganza"), then the fashion show commences.

After the contestants present their looks, the judges deliver their critiques, deliberate, and share the results with the group. Alaska, Katya, and Phi Phi O'Hara receive positive critiques, and Alaska and Katya as announced as the top two contestants. Detox, Roxxxy Andrews, and Tatianna receive negative critiques and are announced as the bottom three contestants. After the contestants deliberate off stage, Alaska and Katya face off in a lip-sync contest to "Le Freak" (1978) by Chic. Alaska wins the lip-sync and decides to eliminate Tatianna from the competition.

== Production and broadcast ==
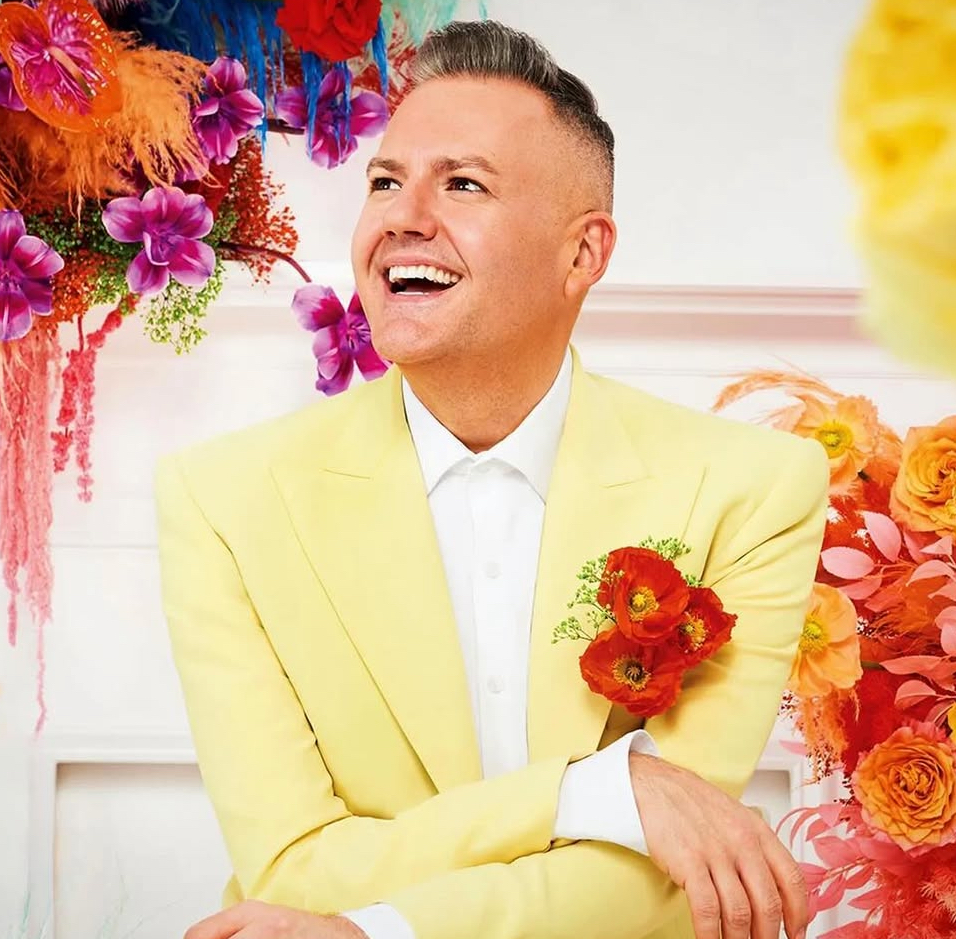
Ross Mathews (pictured in 2022) is a guest judge.

The episode originally aired on September 1, 2016.

=== Fashion ===
In the workroom, RuPaul wears a red suite with white polka dots. For the main stage, RuPaul wears a long pink dress and a matching wig. For the fashion show, the contestants wear outfits with latex. Phi Phi O'Hara has a blue outfit with rubber ducks as accessories. She has a long blue wig. Roxxxy Andrews wears a long black dress and a long brown wig. Alyssa Edwards has a short yellow dress with images of pink lips. She has tall black boots and a large yellow wig. Katya wears a sea foam green-and-pink swimsuit with a cap on her head. Tatianna has a short black dress, matching boots, and a long dark wig. Alaska has a short black dress with long black gloves and a blonde wig. Ginger Minj has a long blue gown and a blonde wig. Detox wears a black-and-red outfit with gold chains hanging from her headpiece.

== Reception ==
Bianca Guzzo included the impersonations by Alaska, Alyssa Edwards, and Katya in IN Magazine's 2018 list of the ten "most gag-worthy" Snatch Game performances. Paul Ciampanelli included Alaska's "profane" impersonation in Screen Rant's 2021 list of the ten best Snatch Game performances. Ciampanelli said Alaska "had a witty rejoinder for everything Ru said to her during the challenge, sending Ru into fits of laughter and winning decisively". In 2022, the website's Dalton Norman said Alaska "chose to portray legendary screen star Mae West and she exquisitely lampooned the actresses personality to hilarious result".

Kevin O'Keeffe ranked the "Le Freak" performance number 86 in INTO Magazine's 2018 "definitive ranking" of the Drag Race lip-syncs to date. Sam Brooks ranked the performance number 58 in The Spinoff's 2019 "definitive ranking" of 162 Drag Race lip-syncs to date. Bernardo Sim ranked the "Le Freak" performance number 16 in Out magazine's 2025 list of the 30 best lip-sync contests on All Stars. Sim said Alaska and Katya were "both looking totally insane but still giving us the full fantasy of what their characters were supposed to be. Mind-blowing, creative, and exciting." In a different article about Snatch Game winners, Sim said, "Alaska's impersonation of Mae West on All Stars 2 is widely considered one of the best performances in Drag Race herstory. Though there was never any doubt that Alaska was a talented and hilarious queen, this performance has gone down as one of the best Snatch Game moments of all time." He also called Katya's performance during the main challenge "one of the funniest and most epic impersonations in the herstory of the series".
