= Revenge of the Queens =

2016 episode of RuPaul's Drag Race All Stars

- RuPaul's Drag Race All Stars episode
- Episode no.: Season 2 Episode 5
- Presented by: RuPaul
- Original air date: September 22, 2016
- Running time: 42 minutes

Guest appearances
- Ross Matthews (guest judge); Chelsea Peretti

Episode chronology
← Previous "Drag Movie Shequels"	Next → "Drag Fish Tank"
- RuPaul's Drag Race All Stars season 2

"Revenge of the Queens" is the fifth episode of the second season of the American reality competition television series RuPaul's Drag Race All Stars. It originally aired on VH1 on September 15, 2016. The episode's main challenge tasks the final five contestants with pairing up with the four eliminated contestants to perform a live stand-up comedy act in front of an audience of past contestants of RuPaul's Drag Race. Ross Mathews is a guest judge. Chelsea Peretti also makes a guest appearance.

Phi Phi O'Hara is eliminated from the competition by Alyssa Edwards, who places in the top of the main challenge and wins a lip-sync contest against Tatianna to "Shut Up and Drive" (2007) by Rihanna.

== Episode ==
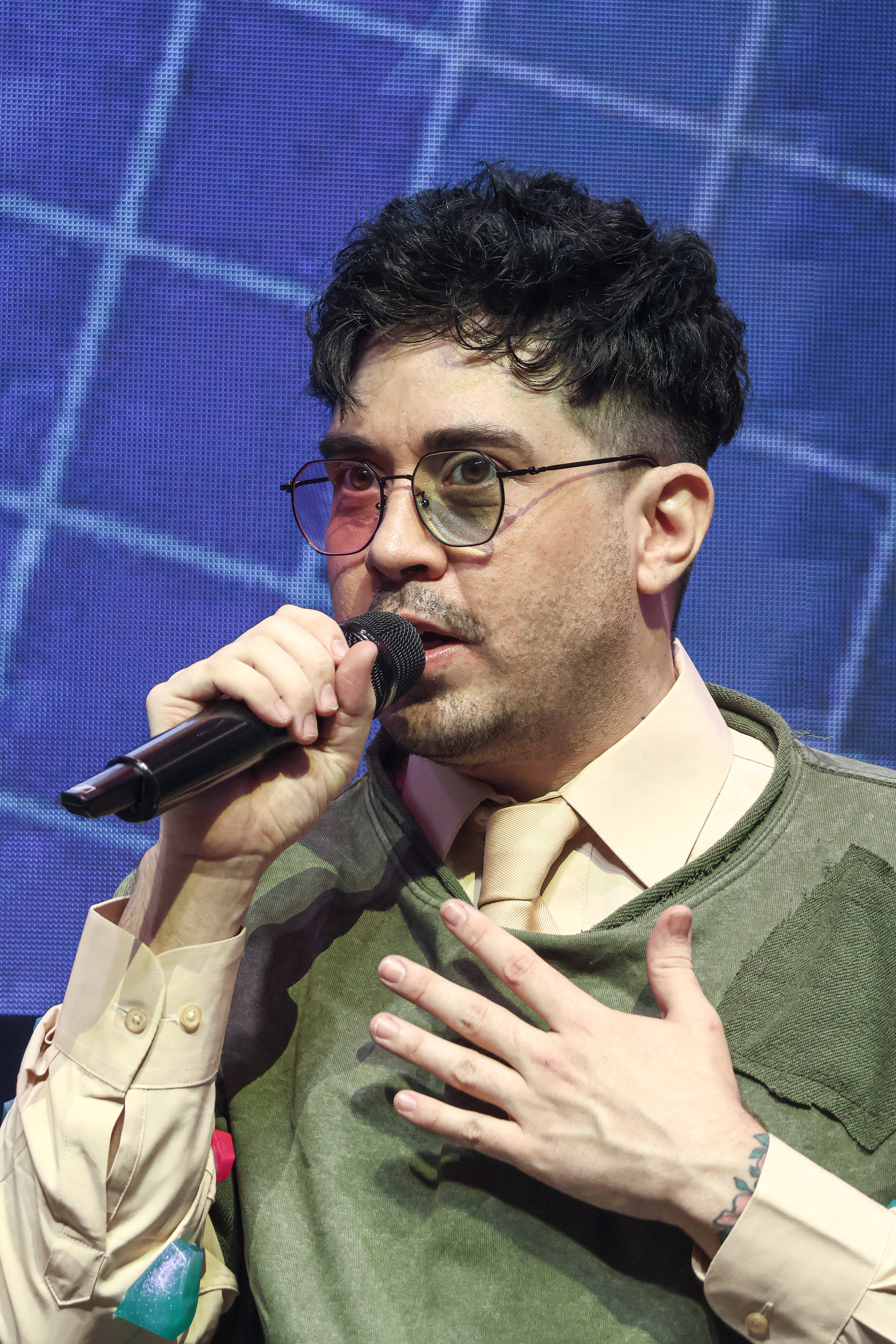
Phi Phi O'Hara (pictured in 2026) is eliminated from the competition.

The final five contestants (Alaska, Detox, Katya, Phi Phi O'Hara, and Roxxxy Andrews) are in the workroom after the elimination of Alyssa Edwards on the previous episode. One of the mirrors is backlit, revealing a secret room behind it with the eliminated contestants (minus Adore Delano, who quit earlier in the season) standing with angry facial expressions, all having heard Phi Phi O'Hara's comments. The eliminated contestants then enter the workroom in the order they were eliminated in (Coco Montrese, Tatianna, Ginger Minj, Alyssa Edwards). Alyssa Edwards confronts Phi Phi O'Hara, then Ginger Minj confronts Alyssa Edwards.

On a new day, the nine contestants enter the workroom. RuPaul greets the group and reveals the main challenge, which tasks the contestants with performing stand-up comedy routines in pairs, giving the eliminated contestants an opportunity to return to the competition. RuPaul adds that the audience will be made of past Drag Race contestants. The eliminated contestants then choose their partners in the order they were eliminated. Alyssa Edwards selects Alaska, Ginger Minj selects Katya, Tatianna selects Detox, and Coco Montrese selects Phi Phi O'Hara, leaving Roxxxy Andrews solo. RuPaul confirms Roxxxy Andrews will be the show's emcee, with the benefit of having sole power to make the decision of which eliminated contestant gets to return and which member of the final five will be eliminated from the competition. The contestants begin to develop their routines in the workroom, then rehearse with Ross Mathews and Chelsea Peretti. Back in the workroom, Alyssa Edwards and Phi Phi O'Hara discuss the tension between them.

On the main stage, RuPaul welcomes fellow judges Michelle Visage, Carson Kressley, and Todrick Hall, as well as guest judge Mathews. RuPaul shares the assignment of the main challenge, then the comedy show commences. The judges deliver their critiques, then share some results. Alyssa Edwards and Tatianna are the top two contestants. Phi Phi O'Hara and Roxxxy Andrews place in the bottom. The contestants deliberate in the workroom, then Alyssa Edwards and Tatianna face off in a lip-sync contest to "Shut Up and Drive" (2007) by Rihanna. RuPaul names both contestants as winners, allowing them both to re-enter the competition and to eliminate a contestant. Alyssa Edwards and Tatianna both choose to eliminate Phi Phi O'Hara. On her way out, she refuses a condolence hug from Alyssa Edwards and accepts one from Tatianna. Phi Phi O'Hara returns to the workroom to write a lipstick message on the mirror for the remaining contestants.

== Production and broadcast ==
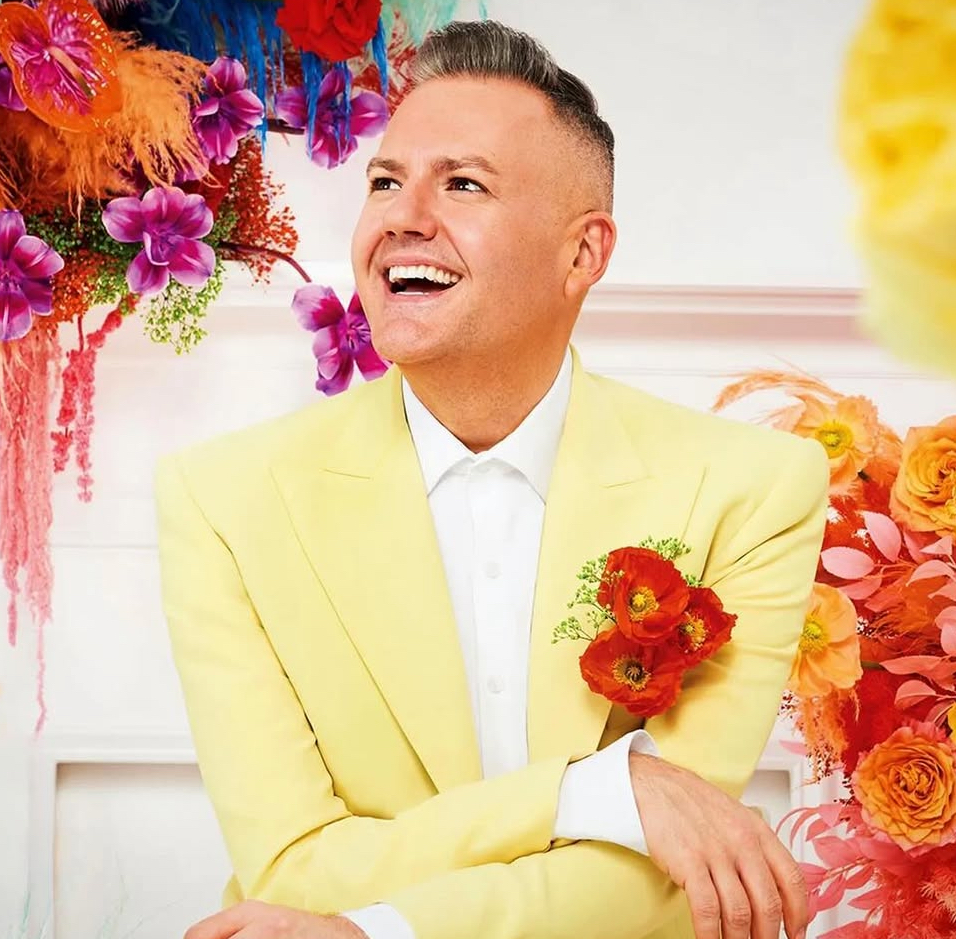
Ross Mathews (pictured in 2022) is a guest judge.

The episode originally aired on VH1 on September 15, 2016.

During the main challenge, Roxxxy Andrews plays the character Tasha Salad.

=== Fashion ===
For the main challenge, Alaska and Alyssa Edwards both wear red outfits. Detox and Tatianna both wear black-and-white outfits and blonde wigs. Katya wears a black dress and a blonde wig. Roxxxy Andrews wears a colorful outfit, large hoop earrings, and a long wig. Ginger ink wears a blue dress and a red wig. Coco Montrese wears an animal print and a red wig. Phi Phi O'Hara wears a pink outfit, long nails, and braids.

== Reception ==
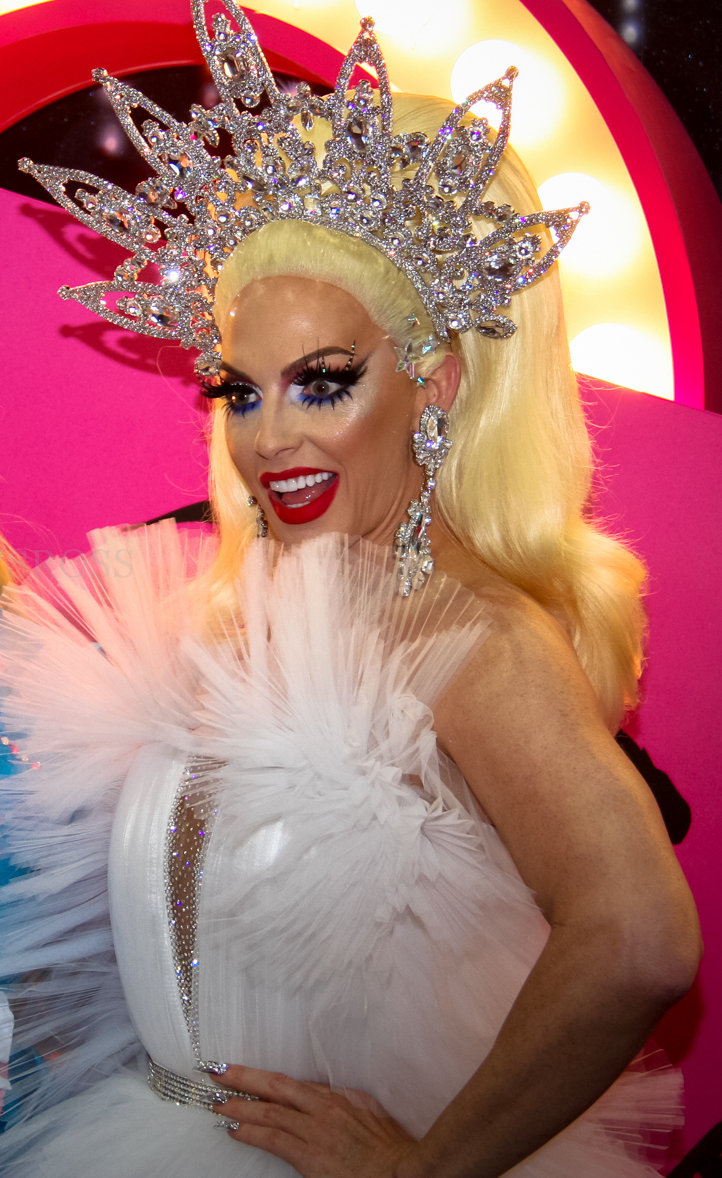
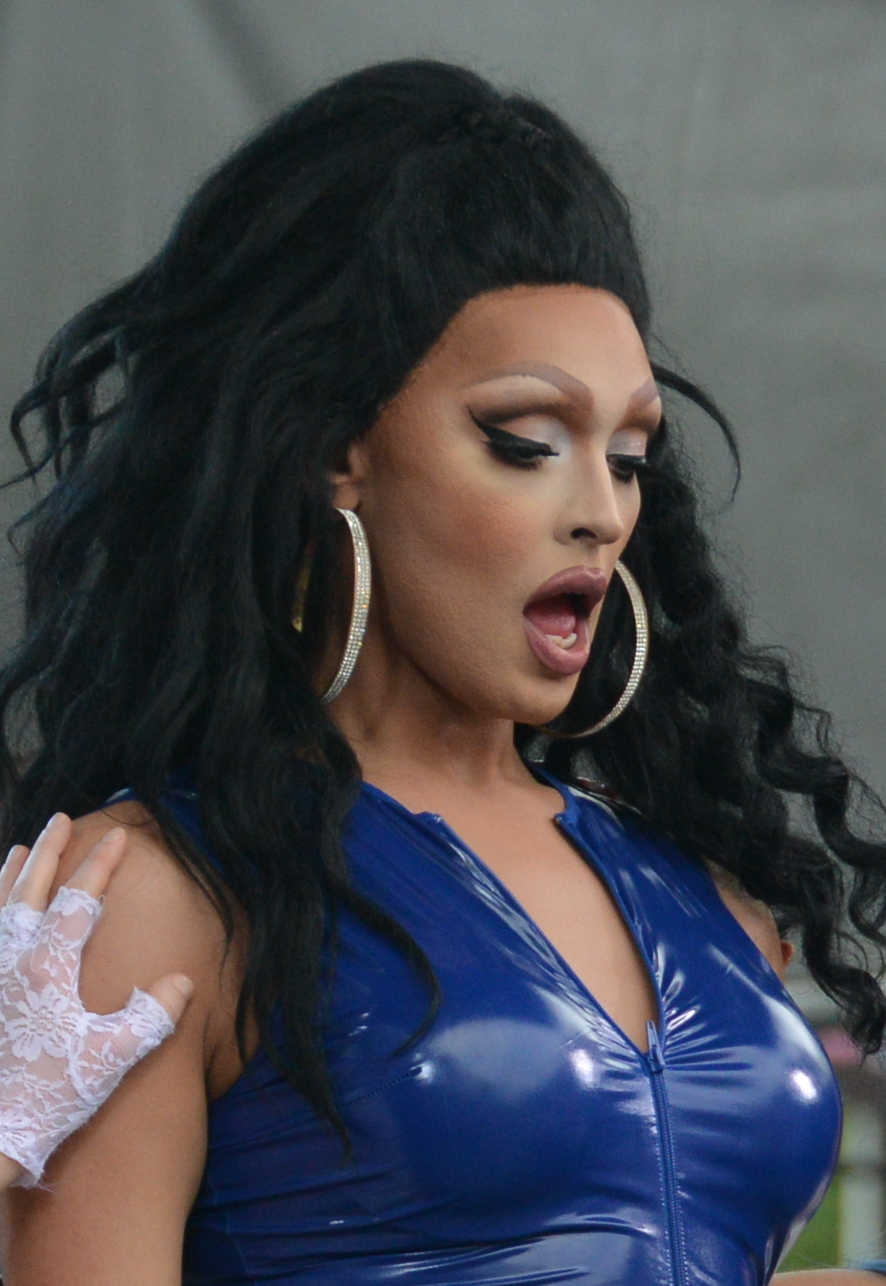
Alyssa Edwards (left, pictured at RuPaul's DragCon LA in 2019) and Tatianna (right, pictured in 2018) are both declared winners of the lip-sync contest.

Oliver Sava of The A.V. Club gave the episode a rating of 'A'. Writing for Vulture, Joel Kim Booster rated the episode five out of five stars. Andy Denhart of Reality Blurred praised the episode's twist of eliminated contestants potentially returning, calling it "solid" overall.

The episode is consistently regarded as one of the best Drag Race episodes of all time. Kevin O'Keeffe included the episode in INTO Magazine's 2018 "newbie's guide to 'RuPaul’s Drag Race': the 5 episodes that will make anyone a fan". In a ranking of 30 seasons of Drag Race, Gay Times ranked All Stars 2 in first place, specifically shouting out this episode, stating it as a "highlight of an already incredible season". Xtra Magazine listed the episode as the best in a 2020 ranking. For a long time, the episode held the record for the highest IMDb rating of all RuPaul's Drag Race All Stars episodes with a 9.6/10, but has since been beaten by an All Stars 7 episode. Josh Milton of PinkNews called the episode "iconic" in 2021.

Alyssa Edwards and Tatianna's "Shut Up and Drive" performance is also commonly regarded as a highlight, ranking among Screen Rant's fifteen best Drag Race lip-syncs. Kevin O'Keeffe ranked the performance second in INTO Magazine's 2018 "definitive ranking" of Drag Race lip-syncs. Emma Kelly also included the performance in Metro's 2018 list of the "best and most gag-worthy" lip-syncs in Drag Race history. Sam Brooks ranked the performance first in The Spinoff's 2019 "definitive ranking" of 162 Drag Race lip-syncs, writing: "The clear winner. A triumph of performance, of narrative, of song choice, of queens, of basically everything. This is what Drag Race is at its finest: artists doing their best, to a Rihanna song."
