= Drag Movie Shequels =

2016 episode of RuPaul's Drag Race All Stars

- RuPaul's Drag Race All Stars episode
- Episode no.: Season 2 Episode 4
- Presented by: RuPaul
- Original air date: September 15, 2016

Guest appearances
- Nicole Scherzinger (guest judge); Big Freedia; Victoria "Porkchop" Parker

Episode chronology
| ← Previous "HERstory of the World" | Next → "Revenge of the Queens" |
- RuPaul's Drag Race All Stars season 2

"Drag Movie Shequels" is the fourth episode of the second season of the American television series RuPaul's Drag Race All Stars. It originally aired on September 15, 2016. The episode's main challenge tasks the contestants with pairing up and performing in parody film sequels. American singer Nicole Scherzinger is a guest judge. American rapper Big Freedia and former contestant Victoria "Porkchop" Parker also make guest appearances for the main challenge. Alyssa Edwards is eliminated from the competition by Alaska, who places in the top of the main challenge and wins a lip-sync contest against Phi Phi O'Hara to "Got to Be Real" (1978) by Cheryl Lynn.

== Episode ==
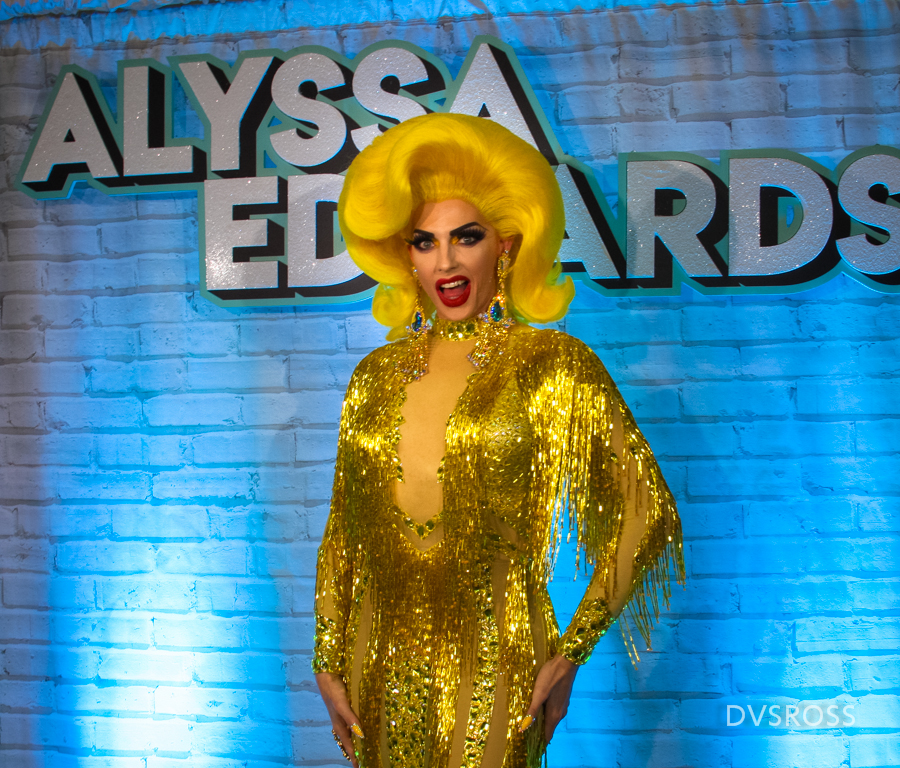
Alyssa Edwards (pictured at RuPaul's DragCon LA in 2018) is eliminated from the competition.

The contestants return to the workroom after Ginger Minj's elimination on the previous episode. Alyssa Edwards explains why she eliminated Ginger Minj from the competition. Detox shares that she would have sent home Katya, had she won the lip-sync contest. On a new day, RuPaul greets the group and reveals the main challenge, which tasks the contestants with pairing up and acting in parody film sequels. The contestants select their own teammates. Following are the sketches and pairs:

- Showsquirrels – Phi Phi O'Hara and Roxxxy Andrews
- Velma & Weezy – Detox and Katya
- Wha' Ha' Happened to Baby JJ? – Alaska and Alyssa Edwards

The pairs review the scripts and begin to rehearse, then film with Michelle Visage and Todrick Hall as directors. On the main stage, RuPaul welcomes fellow judges Visage, Carson Kressley, and Hall, as well as guest judge Nicole Scherzinger. RuPaul shares the assignment of the main challenge and the runway category ("Two Looks in One"), then the fashion show commences. After the contestants present their looks, the judges and contestants watch the film sequels.

The judges deliver their critiques. Alaska and Phi Phi O'Hara receive positive critiques and are announced as the top two contestants. Alyssa Edwards, Katya, and Roxxxy Andrews receive negative critiques, and are announced as the bottom three contestants. The contestants deliberate in the workroom, then Alaska and Phi Phi O'Hara face off in a lip-sync contest to "Got to Be Real" (1978) by Cheryl Lynn. Alaska wins the lip-sync and decides to eliminate Alyssa Edwards from the competition. Alyssa Edwards returns to the workroom, where RuPaul appears in a video message to share that there will be an opportunity to return to the competition. The contestants return to the workroom. They read Alyssa Edwards's message on the mirror, then Phi Phi O'Hara reveals that she also would have eliminated Alyssa Edwards from the competition. The episode ends with one of the mirrors being backlit to reveal that the first four eliminated contestants are present and listening.

== Production and broadcast ==
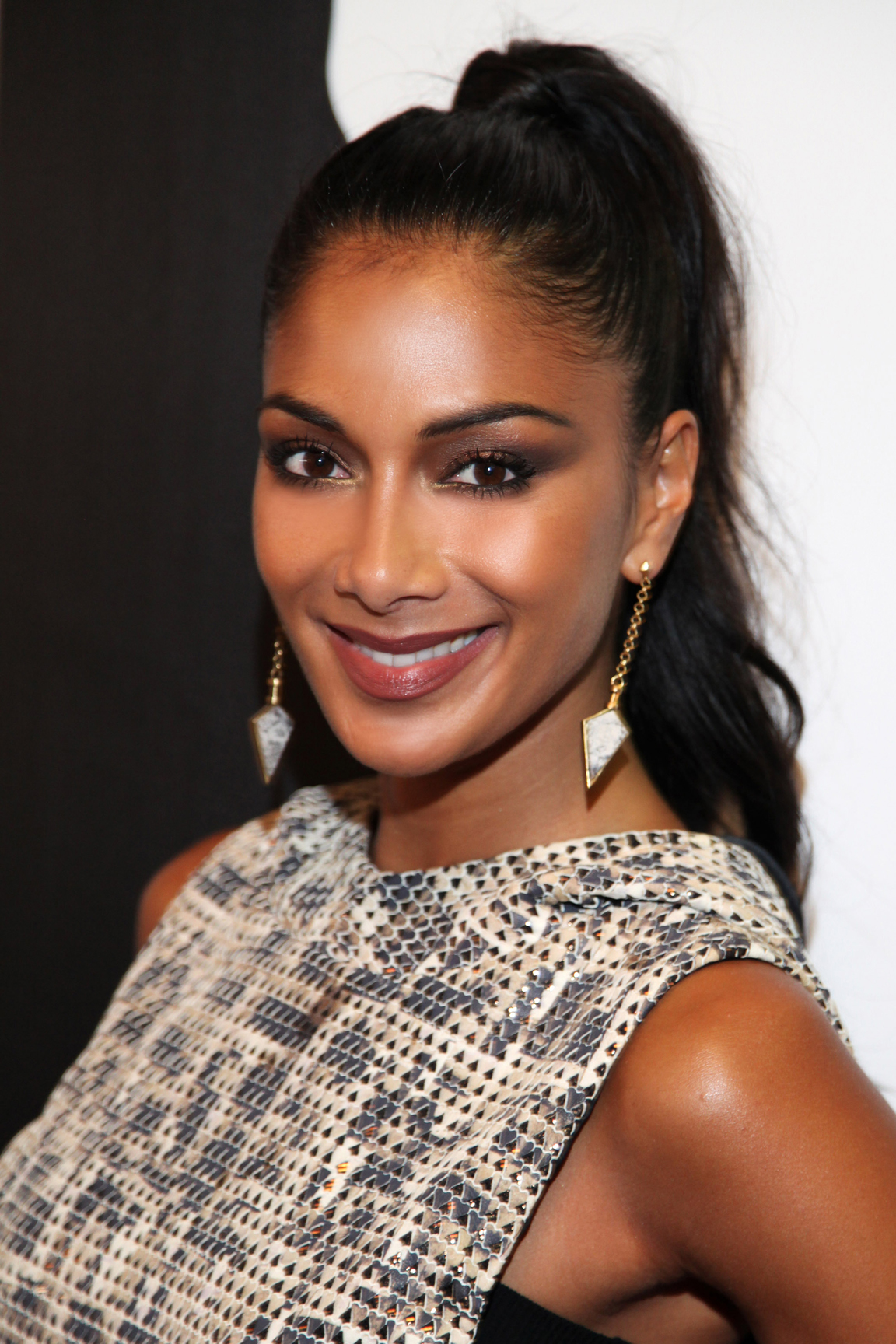
Nicole Scherzinger (pictured in 2012) is a guest judge.

The episode originally aired on September 15, 2016.

Big Freedia makes a guest appearance in Showsquirrels, which is based on the 1995 film Showgirls. Detox and Katya portray zombies in Velma & Weezy, which is a parody of the 1991 film Thelma & Louise.

Wha' Ha' Happened to Baby JJ? is based on What Ever Happened to Baby Jane? (1962). Alaska's character is inspired by Bette Davis's character in the film. Alyssa Edwards flubs her lines during the sketch. Big Freedia and former contestant Victoria "Porkchop" Parker make guest appearances in Wha' Ha' Happened to Baby JJ?

The runway category is inspired by former contestant Violet Chachki.

=== Fashion ===
For the main stage, RuPaul wears a black-and-white dress and a blonde wig. For the fashion show, Phi Phi O'Hara starts with a short blue dress, tall black boots, and a crown. She removes the crown and reveals a long yellow dress underneath. She has a short brown wig. Roxxxy Andrew has a black-and-red outfit and a hat. She removes her hat and reveals a longer Latina diva-inspired outfit. She has a long brown wig. Katya starts with a short red dress, which reveals into a longer one. She has a blonde wig and a pentagram on her forehead. Detox has a colorful outfit and long purple hair. Alyssa Edwards drops the bottom part of her dress to show cameras. She has a long blonde wig. Alaska comes out covered in black clothing, which is removed to reveal her look resembling Lil' Poundcake. She has a pink dress and a blonde wig.

== Reception ==
Oliver Sava of The A.V. Club gave the episode a rating of 'B'. Writing for Vulture, Joel Kim Booster rated the episode five out of five stars. Sam Brooks ranked the "Got to Be Real" performance number 65 in The Spinoff's 2019 "definitive ranking" of 162 Drag Race lip-sync contests to date. Josh Korngut included Wha' Ha' Happened to Baby JJ? in Pride.com's 2023 list of the ten " best horror movie references in RuPaul’s Drag Race herstory".
