= Drag Fish Tank =

Episode of RuPaul's Drag Race All Stars

- RuPaul's Drag Race All Stars episode
- Episode no.: Season 2 Episode 6
- Presented by: RuPaul
- Original air date: September 29, 2016

Guest appearances
- Graham Norton (guest judge); Andrew Christian; Marcus Lemonis

Episode chronology
← Previous "Revenge of the Queens"	Next → "Family That Drags Together"
- RuPaul's Drag Race All Stars season 2

"Drag Fish Tank" is the sixth episode of the second season of the American television series RuPaul's Drag Race All Stars. It originally aired on September 29, 2016. Graham Norton is a guest judge. Andrew Christian and Marcus Lemonis also make guest appearances, the former to assist with the mini-challenge and the latter to offer advice to contestants in the workroom.

Tatianna is eliminated from the competition by Alaska, who places in the top of the main challenge and wins a lip-sync contest against Katya to "Cherry Bomb" by Joan Jett & The Blackhearts.

== Episode ==
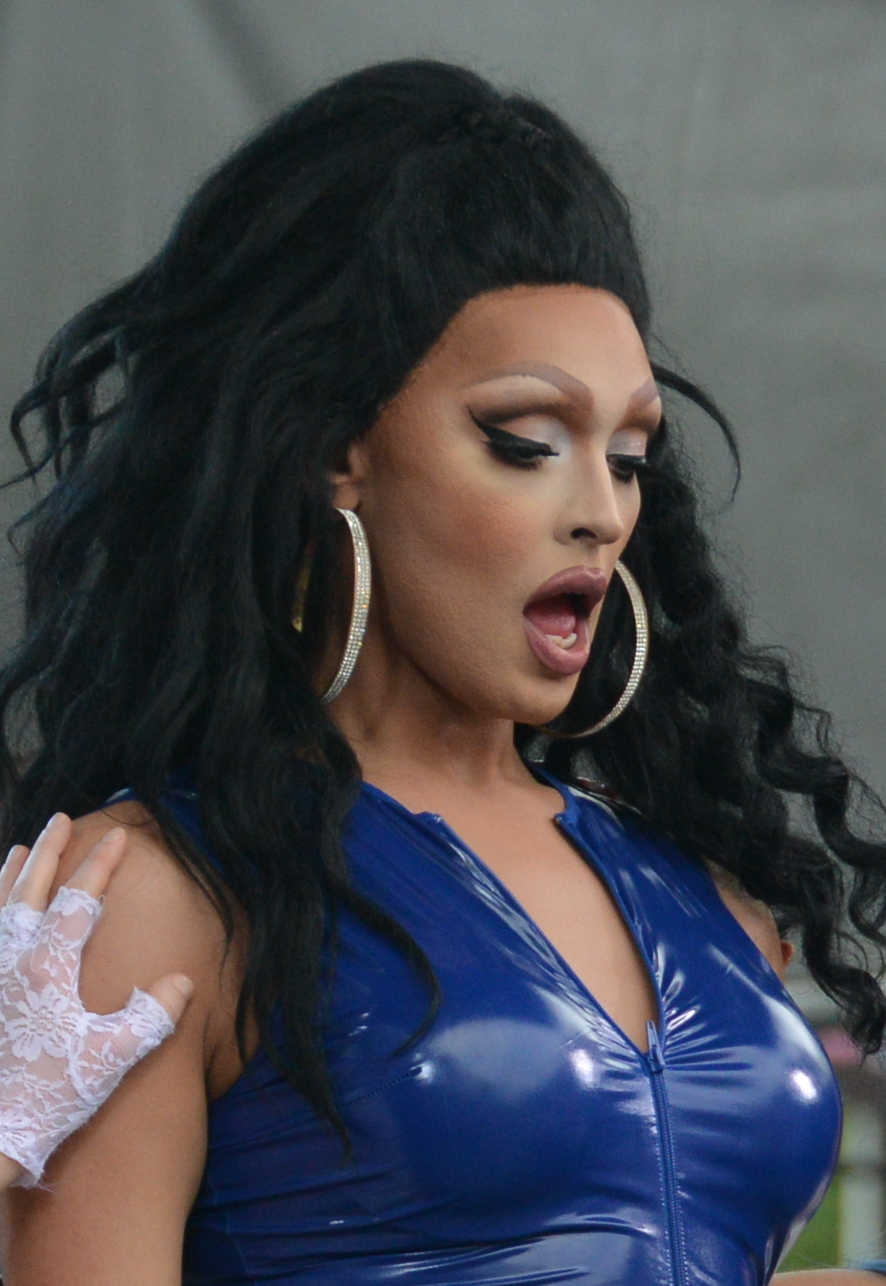
Tatianna (pictured in 2018) is eliminated from the competition by Alaska.

The contestants return to the workroom after Phi Phi O'Hara was eliminated from the competition and Alyssa Edwards and Tatianna returned to the competition on the previous episode. On a new day, RuPaul greets the group and reveals the mini-challenge, which tasks the contestants with playing a game of golf called "Butt Butt Golf". RuPaul invites Andrew Christian and members of the Pit Crew to assist. Alaska wins the mini-challenge.

RuPaul then reveals the main challenge, which tasks the contestants with creating drag-influenced merchandise and a promotional commercial. The contestants begin to develop their concepts. RuPaul returns to the workroom with businessman Marcus Lemonis; the two meet with the contestants individually, asking questions and offering advice. Before leaving, RuPaul reveals that the contestants will be filming the commercials with Michelle Visage and Carson Kressley. The contestants film in front of a green screen.

On elimination day, the contestants make final preparations in the workroom for the fashion show. On the main stage, RuPaul welcomes fellow judges Visage, Kressley, and Todrick Hall, as well as guest judge Graham Norton. RuPaul shares the assignment of the main challenge and the runway category ("Pants"), then the fashion show commences. After the contestants present their looks, the judges and contestants watch the commercials. Following are the contestants and products:

- Roxxxy Andrews – Roxxxy's Wig Tricks Instructional DVD + Roxxxy Andrews Extra-Tacky Wig Glue!
- Katya – Krisis Kontrol by Katya, a "a moisturizing body spray"
- Alyssa Edwards – Drop Dead Gorgeous Energy Drink
- Detox – Detox's Talkin' Trash Receptacle
- Alaska – Alaska Thunderfun Fashion Tape
- Tatianna – Spill the Tea... with Tati Designer Tea Set

The judges deliver their critiques, then RuPaul announces that Alaska and Katya are the top two contestants. Roxxxy Andrews and Tatianna are the bottom two contestants. The contestants deliberate in the workroom, then Alaska and Katya face off in a lip-sync contest to "Cherry Bomb" by Joan Jett & The Blackhearts. Alaska wins the lip-sync and decides to eliminate Tatianna from the competition. Tatianna returns to the workroom to write a message on the mirror for the remaining contestants.

== Production and broadcast ==
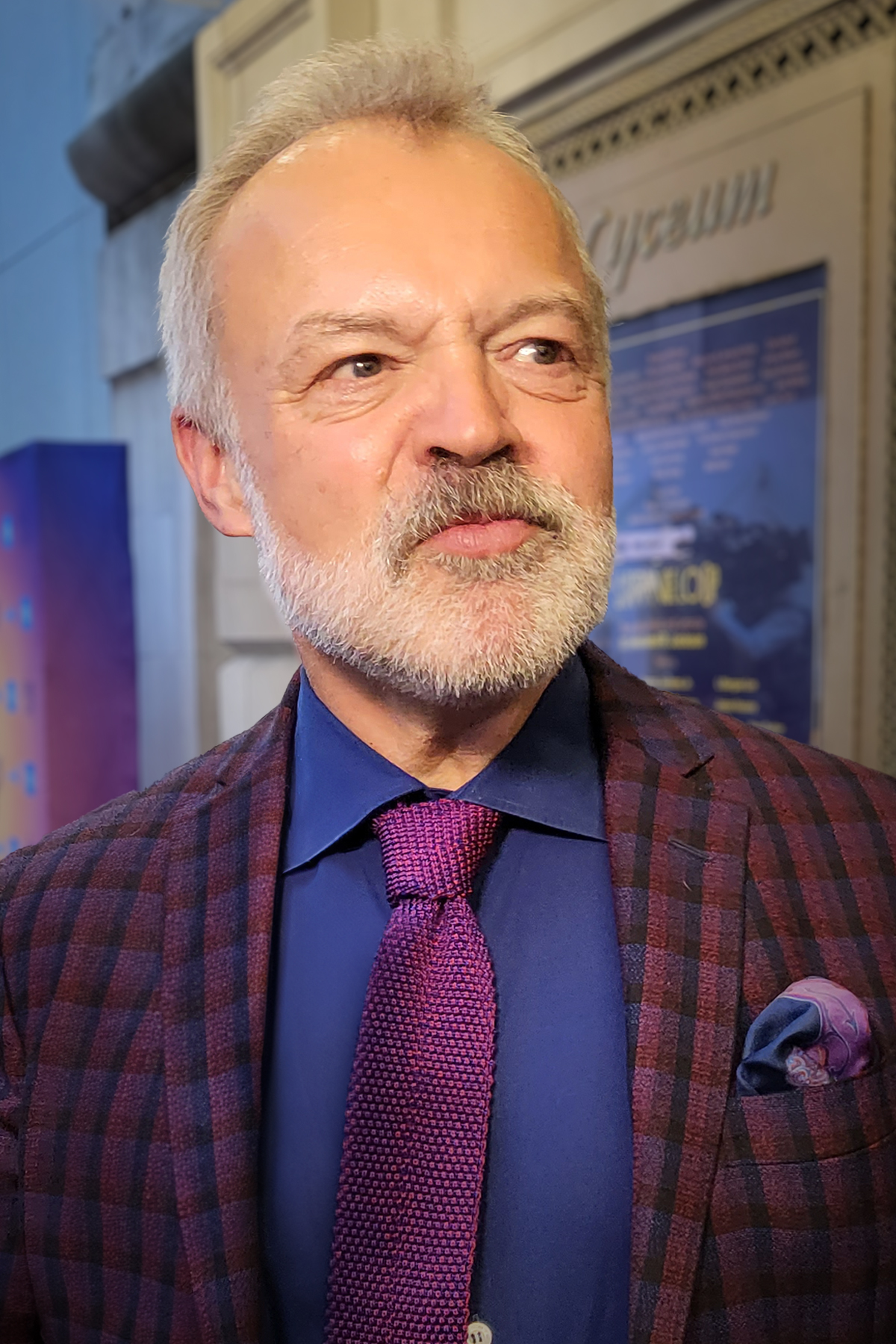
Graham Norton (pictured in 2023) is a guest judge.

The episode originally aired on September 29, 2016.

Benjamin Riley of the Star Observer said Katya "drew on her experience of anxiety to sell a placebo-filled spray bottle designed to calm the 'cacophony of demonic voices in my head telling me 'you're not good enough'".

== Fashion ==
For the main stage, RuPaul wears a black dress, black hoop earrings, and a large blonde wig. For the fashion show, the contestants wear pants. Roxxxy Andrews has bell-bottoms, large hoop earrings, and a large curly blonde wig. Katya wears a 1980s-inspired outfit and a short blonde wig. Alyssa Edwards has a black outfit, a headpiece, and a red wig. Detox wears a red-a-white outfit with a white hat and a red wig. Alaska has a red, white, and blue outfit with suspenders and a curly blonde wig. Tatianna has a T-Boz-inspired black outfit with large hoop earrings.

== Reception ==
Oliver Sava of The A.V. Club gave the episode a rating of 'B'. Writing for Vulture, Joel Kim Booster rated the episode three out of five stars. In 2018, Jennifer Gannon of The Irish Times called Katya's commercial for Krisis Kontrol "unforgettable". Sam Brooks ranked the "Cherry Bomb" performance number 47 in The Spinoff's 2019 "definitive ranking" of 162 Drag Race lip-syncs to date. Shannon Barbour included "Cherry Bomb" in Cosmopolitan's 2024 list of "the absolute best lip-sync battles in RuPaul’s Drag Race history". Barbour said, "No pair of queens could’ve done this song justice the way Alaska and Katya did." Bernardo Sim ranked the performance number 24 in Out magazine's 2025 list of the 30 best lip-syncs on All Stars. Sim said it "really is, has been, and will continue to be an exciting, hilarious, and sickening performance".
