= Cultural depictions of Marie Antoinette =

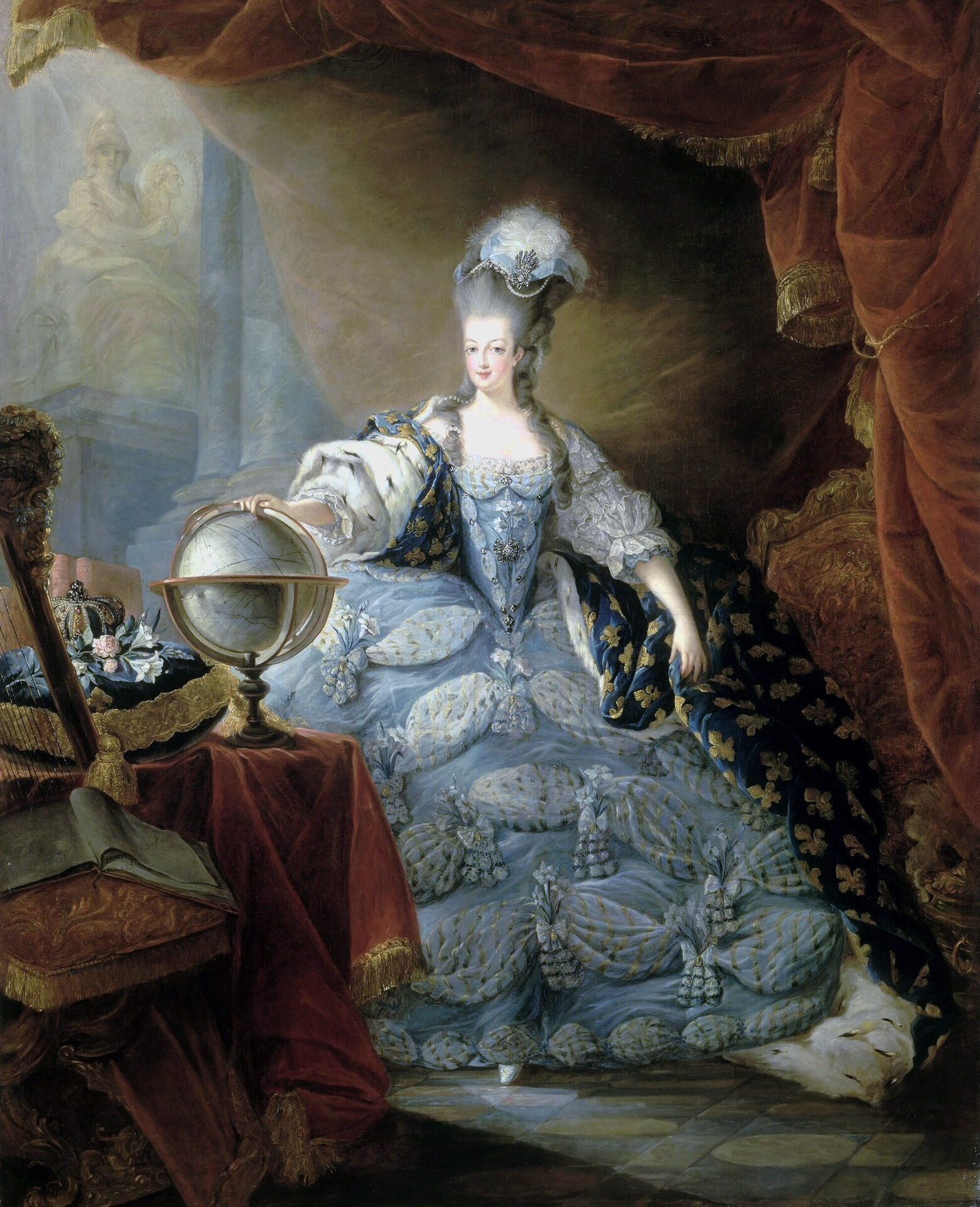
Queen Marie Antoinette en grand habit de cour, by Jean-Baptiste Gautier Dagoty, 1775.

Queen Marie Antoinette of France is best remembered for her legendary extravagance and her death: she was executed by guillotine during the Reign of Terror at the height of the French Revolution in 1793 for the crime of treason. Her life has been the subject of many historically accurate biographies and the subject of romance novels and films.

== In biographies ==
As were many people and events involved with the French Revolution, Marie Antoinette's life and role in the great social-political conflict were contingent upon many factors. Many have speculated about how influential she was on the nature of the revolution and the direction it eventually took. In light of the varying contingencies surrounding her life that made her a hated and despised figure in the revolutionaries' eyes as queen, she was viewed as a genuine model of the old regime, perhaps even more than her husband, King Louis XVI. Due to her frivolous spending and indulgent royal lifestyle, as well as her well-known desire to promote the Austrian empire, her caring, motherly nature was overshadowed, and revolutionaries only saw her as an obstruction to the Revolution.

The view on Marie Antoinette's role in French history has varied widely throughout the years. Even during her life, she was a popular icon of goodness and a symbol of everything wrong with the French monarchy, the latter being a view that has persisted to this day far stronger than the former. However, some would argue that the common historical perspective on Marie Antoinette is that she was yet another tragic victim of the radicalism of the Revolution, rather than a great symbol of French royal inadequacies. This view tends to sympathize with Marie Antoinette and her family's plight and focus more on the documentation surrounding the last months, weeks, and days before her execution, where she is more clearly seen as Marie Antoinette the penitent, caring mother rather than the defiant queen of France.

Some contemporary sources, such as Mary Wollstonecraft and Thomas Jefferson, place the blame of the French Revolution and the subsequent Reign of Terror squarely on Marie Antoinette's shoulders; others, such as those who knew her (her lady-in-waiting Madame Campan and the royal governess, the marquise de Tourzel, among them) focus more on her sweet character and considerable courage in the face of misunderstanding and adversity. According to Campan, the queen was misunderstood by her subjects and the nobility at Versailles. Campan describes several people who, upon spending time with the queen, left with a more positive opinion of her. One such visitor, M. Loustonneau, the first surgeon to the king, was humbled when the queen remarked, "if the poor whom you have succored for the past twenty years had each placed a single candle in their windows, it would have been the most beautiful illumination ever witnessed."

Immediately after her death, the picture painted by the libelles of the queen was held as the "correct" view of Marie Antoinette for many years, as the news of her execution was received with joy by the French populace, and the libelles did not stop circulating even after her death. However, she was also considered a martyr by royalists both in and out of France, so much so that the Tower was demolished by Napoleon to get rid of all symbols of the oppression of the royal family. The queen's view as a martyr was generally held in the post-Napoleonic era and through the nineteenth century, though publications were still written. The ultra-republican work of Jules Michelet portrayed the queen as a frivolous spendthrift who single-handedly ruined France. This view is not widely accepted as accurate by most modern historians, though even the less biased contemporary sources quickly point out that the queen had faults that contributed to her condition.

The end of the nineteenth century brought about some more changes in how the queen was viewed, particularly in light of the (heavily censored) publication of Count Axel Fersen's Journal intime by one of his descendants; theories about a torrid decade-long love affair between queen and count has become an area of debate since then. In particular, the popular theory is that Louis Charles, the second Dauphin (who would ultimately die at the age of 10 from maltreatment), was Fersen's child and that the king was aware of it. Those who argue in favor of this theory point to the words of insiders who knew of the queen's alleged affair and the words of Fersen regarding the child's death, which indicate it to be a possibility. Others argue the queen had a liaison, but it produced no child; others do not believe that an affair took place.

The twentieth century brought about the recovery of some items that belonged to the queen thought lost forever and a wave of new biographies, which began to show the queen in a somewhat more sympathetic light. Even those that were critical of the queen were more balanced than their eighteenth and nineteenth-century predecessors. Public perception was also aided in the twentieth century with the advent of movies based upon biographies of the queen, the most famous of them including the Oscar-nominated 1938 Norma Shearer feature Marie Antoinette (based upon the 1932 book Marie Antoinette: The Portrait of an Average Woman by Stefan Zweig) and the 2006 Kirsten Dunst feature Marie Antoinette (based upon the 2001 book Marie Antoinette: The Journey by Lady Antonia Fraser). Some modern historians consider the latter author's book to be the most thorough and balanced biography of the queen. However, it naturally builds upon earlier biographies, first-hand accounts, and even the infamous libelles which destroyed the queen's reputation. Another book was written by famous American novelist Upton Sinclair in the form of a play titled Marie Antoinette.

== In film ==
Date	Title	Director	Portrayed by
1923	Scaramouche	Rex Ingram	Clotilde Delano
1930	Captain of the Guard	John S. Robertson	Evelyn Hall
1934	Madame Du Barry	William Dieterle	Anita Louise
1937	The King Without a Crown	Jacques Tourneur	Doris Lloyd
1938	Marie Antoinette	W.S. Van Dyke	Norma Shearer
1938	La Marseillaise	Jean Renoir	Lise Delamare
1949	Black Magic	Gregory Ratoff	Nancy Guild
1952	Scaramouche	George Sidney	Nina Foch
1954	Royal Affairs in Versailles	Sacha Guitry	Lana Marconi
1956	Marie-Antoinette reine de France	Jean Delannoy	Michèle Morgan
1957	The Story of Mankind	Irwin Allen	Marie Wilson
1959	John Paul Jones	John Farrow	Susana Canales
1961	La Fayette	Jean Dréville	Liselotte Pulver
1970	Start the Revolution Without Me	Bud Yorkin	Billie Whitelaw
1979	Lady Oscar	Jacques Demy	Christine Böhm
1981	History of the World, Part I	Mel Brooks	Fiona Richmond
1982	La Nuit de Varennes	Ettore Scola	Eléonore Hirt
1989	La Révolution française	Robert Enrico, Richard T. Heffron	Jane Seymour
1989	L'autrichienne	Pierre Granier-Deferre	Ute Lemper
1995	Jefferson in Paris	James Ivory	Charlotte de Turckheim
2001	The Affair of the Necklace	Charles Shyer	Joely Richardson
2006	Marie Antoinette	Sofia Coppola	Kirsten Dunst
2006	Marie-Antoinette, la véritable histoire	Yves Simoneau, Francis Leclerc	Karine Vanasse
2012	Farewell, My Queen	Benoît Jacquot	Diane Kruger
2014	Mr. Peabody and Sherman	Rob Minkoff	Lauri Fraser
2018	One Nation, One King	Pierre Schoeller	Maëlia Gentil
2022	Chevalier	Stephen Williams	Lucy Boynton
2023	Napoleon	Ridley Scott	Catherine Walker
2023	Jeanne du Barry	Maïwenn	Pauline Pollmann
2024	Le Déluge	Gianluca Jodice	Mélanie Laurent
2025	The Rose of Versailles	Ai Yoshimura	Aya Hirano

== In television ==
- In 1979–1980 TV anime version of The Rose of Versailles, she is voiced by Miyuki Ueda.
- Elizabeth Berrington played Marie Antoinette in the BBC sitcom Let Them Eat Cake
- Sue Perkins portrayed in the third episode of the second series of The Supersizers Eat (aired BBC One, 9:00 pm Monday 6 July 2009)
- Marie Antoinette appeared in an episode of Johnny Bravo, where she spoke with a French accent.
- In The Addams Family, Wednesday Addams has a headless doll named Marie Antoinette.
- In My Life as a Teenage Robot, Marie Antoinette is created by Uncle Wizzly as a Historionic.
- In Toy Story, Buzz Lightyear has tea with a headless doll named Marie Antoinette.
- Alice Lowe and Jessica Ransom played Marie Antoinette in the CBBC's Horrible Histories.
- Jayne Meadows played Marie Antoinette in 1977 episodes of the PBS series Meeting of Minds.
- In 2016, the drag queen Detox Icunt portrayed her in Episode 3 of RuPaul's Drag Race All Stars (season 2).
- In episode 3 of The Swiss Family Robinson: Flone of the Mysterious Island, Marie Antoinette's story is depicted.
- A fictional version of Marie Antoinette is portrayed by Courtney Ford in Season 5 of The CW's superhero series Legends of Tomorrow.
- Marie Antoinette appears in an episode of Animaniacs (2020 TV series) voiced by Melissa Rauch with a French accent.
- In Marie Antoinette, Emilia Schüle played the title role.
- In AppleTV's Franklin, She is played by Maria Dragus.

== Casual media references ==
Marie Antoinette has been referenced in numerous motion pictures and television shows, usually as a figure to denote extravagance or doomed beauty.

Some of the more notable examples include the movie adaptation of Gone with the Wind, in which a portrait of the Queen hangs above Scarlett O'Hara's bed in her new mansion in Atlanta. In The Addams Family Values, Wednesday Addams dresses up her new baby brother as Marie-Antoinette and attempts to guillotine him for crimes against the Republic.

In the CW American drama Gossip Girl, a sketch looking very much like Kirsten Dunst in the role of Queen Marie-Antoinette decorates the bedroom of the main character, Blair Waldorf. In the second series of Sex and the City, when Charlotte York criticizes one of her friends for delusively believing that they live in a classless society, Carrie Bradshaw refers to her as a Marie Antoinette. During the wedding of Melanie and Lindsay in Queer as Folk, a decadent French dessert is given as an option for their dinner by a French caterer, to which Melanie sarcastically quips: "And just how much for Marie-Antoinette's last meal?" In the fourth series of Desperate Housewives, Katherine went to a Halloween party thrown by a young gay couple who just moved to the neighborhood. One of the hosts quipped it is appropriate that the domineering Katherine came as a "self-important queen who lost all her power."

In the Gareth Russell novel Popular, one of the lead characters throws a sweet 16 birthday party with a Marie Antoinette theme but is upstaged by one of her guests when she arrives in a costume worn by Kirsten Dunst in the 2006 movie.

In Robert Asprin's Another Fine Myth, there is a pseudo-quotation as an epigraph to chapter 8:

"In times of crisis, it is of utmost importance not to lose one's head."
—M. ANTOINETTE

In Pixar's Toy Story, at the tea party in Hannah's room, Buzz Lightyear (as Mrs. Nesbitt) refers to his headless doll companions as "Marie Antoinette and her little sister."

In Danganronpa: Trigger Happy Havoc, Celestia Ludenberg references that she believes in her past life she was Marie Antoinette.

In Into The Dark, Maggie wears a Marie Antoinette costume to a Halloween party.

In the AMC supernatural horror drama The Terror, George Henry Hodgson wears a Marie Antoinette costume to Carnivale.

Prior to the Revolution, opponents of the French monarchy regularly circulated pornographic propaganda alleging that Marie Antoinette was engaged in lesbian relationships with the Princesse de Lamballe and the Duchesse de Polignac. While the rumors of Antoinette's sexuality were unfounded, they lead to her being interpreted as an early lesbian icon in works by gay authors, such as Radclyffe Hall's The Well of Loneliness (1928) and Jean Genet's The Maids (1947).

== In historical fiction ==
The most famous historical fiction which features Marie Antoinette is the Alexandre Dumas, père novel Le Chevalier de Maison-Rouge (The Knight of the Red House,) which centers on the Carnation Plot. The first of a series of six books written by Dumas with Marie Antoinette featured called the "Marie Antoinette novels." The queen is shown in a sympathetic light, particularly during the "Diamond Necklace Affair."

Some of the more famous historical novels that have portrayed Marie Antoinette in more recent years include Carolly Erickson's 2005 novel The Hidden Diary of Marie Antoinette, Jennifer Donnelly's young adult book Revolution in 2010, as well as Elena Maria Vidal's 1998 book Trianon. A 2000 book in the young adult the Royal Diaries series is about Marie Antoinette's journey to France as a teenager, Marie Antoinette: Princess of Versailles (Austria-France, 1769–1771).

The two best-known movie portrayals of Marie Antoinette have been in the 1938 film Marie Antoinette, directed by W. S. Van Dyke, in which Norma Shearer played the queen. The 2006 film Marie Antoinette, directed by Sofia Coppola and starring Kirsten Dunst. The Affair of the Necklace is a 2001 film in which Hilary Swank played Jeanne de Valois-Saint-Rémy and Joely Richardson played Marie Antoinette.

Marie Antoinette features prominently in The Ghosts of Versailles, partially an operatic adaptation of Beaumarchais' La Mère coupable with a score by John Corigliano and libretto by William M. Hoffman.

In the film Amadeus, she is mentioned twice by her brother, Emperor Joseph II as "Antoinette." Her eventual downfall is foreshadowed when the emperor tells Mozart why he has banned the play Figaro.

In the 2007 film Shrek the Third, Princess Fiona wears a dress at one point in the film that closely resembles Marie Antoinette's oversized gowns.

In the Japanese manga series My Hime, Marie Antoinette is one of two QUEEN Hime who descend to the Earth to remake it. She is associated with roses and possesses a very aristocratic air about herself. In the eighteen episodes of the anime adaptation of the Japanese manga series Black Butler, William T. Spears mentions that the Undertaker sent Marie Antoinette to Hell. Marie Antoinette is also one of the most prominent characters of the Japanese metaseries The Rose of Versailles (ベルサイユのばら, Berusaiyu no Bara). In this series of works, she is portrayed as a very sweet and gentle woman, a loyal friend of Oscar and a loving mother, and an easily influenced and irresponsible queen. Her voice actress was Miyuki Ueda.

The popular quote often misattributed to Marie Antoinette, "Let them eat cake" is referenced in One False Note, the second installment of the book series The 39 Clues.

Seth MacFarlane's Cavalcade of Cartoon Comedy includes a cartoon called "Marie Antoinette's Notepad." In this, Marie writes something down on a piece of paper, but she scratches it out. Then she begins writing again, only for her to scratch it out again. Then she thinks and writes something down. She puts the quill back in its container, and she looks satisfied. Then the paper shows that she has written and scratched out "Let them eat shit" and "Let them eat pussy", and the last line says "Let them eat cake."

Marie Antoinette appears in the children's book Ben and Me (1939) by Robert Lawson, but does not appear in the 1953 animated short film adaptation.

Joan Rivers' book I Hate Everyone... Starting With Me contains a quote by Marie Antoinette saying, "Let her eat shit." Costco then refused to sell the book because of the explicit language.

Juliet Grey's trilogy of books starting with Becoming Marie Antoinette and ending with Confessions of Marie Antoinette tells Marie Antoinette's entire story. It begins with her transformation from Maria Antonia of Austria into the Marie Antoinette of France and ends with the French Revolution and her execution.

Kate Beaton, cartoonist of webcomic Hark! A Vagrant devoted one of her comic strips to Marie Antoinette.

In the two-part Season 6 finale of Totally Spies! Sam, Clover, and Alex win a prize to stay in the palace of Versailles itself. The spies and their fashion-designer classmates are in a French fashion show based on Marie Antoinette and her favorite attire as Queen of France in the seventeenth century.

Carolyn Meyer had written a novel in her Young Royals book series titled The Bad Queen: Rules and Instructions for Marie Antoinette which is set from 1768–1792.

The light novel Tearmoon Empire's protagonist Mia Luna Tearmoon is broadly based on her. She is a victim of the guillotine in the fictional Tearmoon Empire which has many cultural similarities to that of historical France, and her name Mia has the same root as Marie.

== In music ==
- Queen referred to her in "Killer Queen" from their 1974 album Sheer Heart Attack.
- Richard Adler and Jerry Ross included a mention of her as one of the devil's own, in their song "Those Were the Good Old Days," from the musical comedy Damn Yankees.
- Darryl Way and Sonja Kristina Lockwood wrote a song titled "Marie Antoinette" for their prog rock band Curved Air.
- Wayne Shorter wrote a jazz tune of the same name; it was recorded by Freddie Hubbard.
- Michael Kunze and Sylvester Levay wrote a musical play called Marie Antoinette about the parallel lives of Antoinette and a fictional Margrid Arnaud. The play was written in English but premiered in Tokyo.
- The portrait of Marie Antoinette entitled Marie Antoinette à la Rose features as the front cover of the US alternative rock group Hole's 2010 album Nobody's Daughter.
- The Charlie Sexton song "Impressed" references Louis XVI and Marie Antoinette.
- Madonna dressed as Marie Antoinette for her performance of "Vogue" at the 1990 MTV Music Video Awards.
- The music video for the Girls Aloud song "Can't Speak French" features the band members dressed in elaborate French wigs and costumes, the style popularized and typified by Marie Antoinette.
- In the Japanese series of songs "Story of Evil," made by the producer AkunoP (otherwise known as mothy), the evil princess Riliane Lucifen d'Autriche is based on Marie Antoinette. At the same time, a young researcher (Yukina Freesis) records the truth of her life.
- Jucifer's 2008 album L'Autrichienne is a concept album about the life of Marie Antoinette, leading up to her death.
- Marie Antoinette is referenced by name in the song "The Headless Waltz" by artist Voltaire.
- In 2011, Selena Gomez dressed up as Marie Antoinette in one of the scenes of her music video for "Love You Like a Love Song."
- In 2012, Marina Diamandis mentioned Marie Antoinette as an inspiration for her album Electra Heart.
- The song "Marie" by Japanese singer Aimer, inspired by the life of Marie Antoinette, was selected as the theme song for the 2020 "The Habsburg Dynasty: 600 Years of Imperial Collections" exhibition commemorating 150 years of Japanese-Austrian relations.
- The song "Marie Antoinette" by American rapper Boyfriend featuring Big Freedia
- The song "MARIE ANTOINETTE" by American rapper Qveen Herby (2023)

== In video games ==
- Evil Marie is one of the several bosses in Midway Games' arcade shooter CarnEvil. She is a combination of Marie Antoinette and Lizzie Borden.
- In The Elder Scrolls IV: Oblivion, there is an assassin named Antoinetta Marie.
- In the PC game Nancy Drew Treasure in the Royal Tower Marie Antoinette is mentioned throughout the game. The character Beatrice Hotchkiss is a scholar of French history and has written a fictional book about Marie.
- In the PC game Rock of Ages Marie Antoinette is a boss in level 16.
- One of the boss songs in the arcade game Beatmania IIDX 16: Empress is called "Marie Antoinette." It was composed by Marguerite du Prê.
- In the multiplatform game Assassin's Creed Unity, she is one of several historical figures present in the game, generally depicted as a lecherous, gluttonous, deficit spender.
- She appears as a Rider-class, Caster-class, and Avenger-class Servant in Type-Moon's mobile game Fate/Grand Order.
- In Castlevania: Bloodlines, a boss named the Princess of Moss takes on the appearance of Marie Antoinette's ghost.
- In Identity V, a playable character titled Bloody Queen is referenced to be Marie Antoinette's in the deduction descriptions on her character file.
- In Steelrising, Marie Antoinette sends her bodyguard, a sophisticated gynoid named Aegis, to do battle against her husband's army of clockwork automatons. She is portrayed as a concerned maternal figure, although her negative reputation is commented upon by various other characters in the game.

== In fashion ==
The 9th edition of CR Fashion Book is inspired by Marie Antoinette. She is portrayed by Rihanna on the cover, as well as models Lara Stone, Imaan Hammam, Joan Smalls, Guinevere van Seenus, Mariacarla Boscono, and others.

Chanel's 2013 Resort Collection drew inspiration from Marie Antoinette.

== In science ==
Headless monarch butterflies have been dubbed the "Marie Antoinette Phenomenon"
