= Coco Montrese =

American drag queen and entertainer (born 1974)

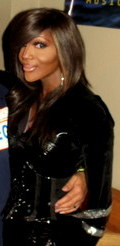
- Coco Montrese in 2014
- Born: Lenwood Martin Cooper; July 2, 1974 (age 51); Miami, Florida, U.S.
- Education: Alabama State University (BA)
- Occupation: Drag queen
- Known for: RuPaul's Drag Race (season 5); RuPaul's Drag Race All Stars (season 2)
- Title: Miss Gay America 2010
- Spouse: Alfonzo Hestle
- Website: misscocomontrese.com

Coco Montrese (born July 2, 1974) is the stage name of Lenwood Martin Cooper, an American drag queen, entertainer, and reality television personality. Montrese came into the spotlight after being crowned Miss Gay America 2010 when Alyssa Edwards' title was revoked. She subsequently appeared on the fifth season of RuPaul's Drag Race as well as the second season of RuPaul's Drag Race All Stars.

== Early life ==
Montrese was born on July 2, 1974, in Miami, Florida. She grew up in a "very religious home" as the child of a Pentecostal pastor. Montrese studied theater and education at Alabama State University.

== Career ==
Montrese became interested in drag around age 19 or 20 and was named by her drag mother Mokha Montrese. She entered pageantry, eventually becoming runner up in the 2010 Miss Gay America pageant. The titleholder, Alyssa Edwards, was stripped of her crown for conflicting business dealings. On February 27, 2010, Montrese was then crowned as Miss Gay America 2010.

Before appearing on RuPaul's Drag Race, Montrese worked at Walt Disney World for 11 years as an entertainer for the Fantasmic show. Working there allowed her to be able to work during the day and do drag during the evenings. She then moved to Las Vegas, where she appeared in a number of shows as a Janet Jackson impersonator.

Montrese applied just once for RuPaul's Drag Race and was accepted for their fifth season as one of fourteen contestants. The series aired during January–May 6, 2013. During the show, Montrese was criticized for her orange makeup, which inspired many internet memes. She was placed in the bottom four times, eventually sending her "arch rival" Alyssa Edwards home during their lipsync. Montrese ended up being sent home by Detox Icunt the next week, garnering a fifth-place finish.

Montrese was chosen to appear on the second season of RuPaul's Drag Race: All Stars, which premiered August 25, 2016. Montrese was the first contestant cut from the show, being eliminated by Roxxxy Andrews.

At the 2016 MTV Video Music Awards, Montrese dressed up as a 1999 Lil' Kim with a purple mermaid-inspired jumpsuit.

Montrese's drag daughter is Las Vegas queen Kahanna Montrese, a contestant on season 11 of Drag Race.

In September 2019, at RuPaul's DragCon NYC, Montrese was named as one of a rotating cast of a dozen Drag Race queens in RuPaul's Drag Race Live!, a Las Vegas show residency at the Flamingo Las Vegas. The show features RuPaul's music and former Drag Race contestants. In March 2022, Montrese, alongside the rest of the RuPaul's Drag Race Live! cast, performed with Katy Perry during her Play concert residency at Resorts World Las Vegas.

In June 2021, she was a featured performer at Nashville's OUTLOUD Music Festival.

Montrese also appeared on the sixth season of RuPaul's Drag Race: All Stars as the 'Lipsync Assassin' of episode 1. She won her lipsync against competitor Yara Sofia, eliminating Serena ChaCha (her fellow competitor from the fifth season of Drag Race).

In July 2022, Coco Montrese headlined the 10th year of Hagerstown Hopes and Hagerstown Pride festival.

=== Pageant titles ===
- Miss Gay America - first alternate, then winner (2010)
- Miss Gay Heart of America (2009)
- Miss Gay Heart of America - first alternate (2008)
- Miss Gay Orlando (2008)
- Miss Gay Days (2008)
- Miss Gay Florida America (2007)
- Miss Gay Florida USofA (2005)
- Miss Lakeland (2003)
- Miss Hernando County

== Personal life ==
Since at least September 2016, Cooper is married to Alfonzo Hestle.

When asked if queer people should support the Black Lives Matter movement, Montrese responded, "I think it’s important the LGBTQ community support all movements that support all people and equality for all. If we don’t start shedding light on these things, younger generations won’t even recognize it. If you don’t bring up the past, you are doomed to repeat it. We’re all fighting for the same thing — they want to be seen as the same as everyone else — so yes, they should support that. "

== RuPaul's Drag Race ==
=== Season 5 ===
In 2012, It was announced that Montrese had been cast on the fifth season of RuPaul's Drag Race. Where she was cast alongside Alyssa Edwards, who she had fallen out with over Edwards being unable to complete her run as Miss Gay America 2010 due to breaking contractual duties and being replaced by Montrese. The pair's history led to many arguments and dramatic moments throughout the season. After a poor showing in a children's show-themed acting challenge in the third episode, Montrese fell into the bottom two alongside Monica Beverly Hillz, where the two would lip sync to The Pussycat Dolls's When I Grow Up which Montrese won, eliminating Beverly Hillz. In episode 6, Montrese would be in the bottom two for a second time, this time against Jade Jolie, who Montrese had formed a friendship with in the competition. Montrese won the lip sync to I'm So Excited by The Pointer Sisters and stayed in the competition. In the following episode, Coco won her first and only main challenge in a roast where she was praised by the judges for her entire performance and her look. In the ninth episode, Montrese and Alyssa Edwards would do badly in a Telenovela challenge and fell in the bottom two together, and after a close lip sync to Paula Abdul's Cold Hearted, Montrese emerged victorious and Edwards was sent home. Montrese's success wouldn't last long however as in the following episode she would land in the bottom for her fourth time and lip synced against Detox to Two to Make It Right by Seduction and lost the lip sync, finishing in fifth place.

=== All Stars 2 ===
In 2016 it was announced that Coco Montrese had been cast on the second season of RuPaul's Drag Race All Stars. The cast included four other queens from season 5, including her season 5 nemesis, Alyssa Edwards. However, upon Montrese's entrance, it is revealed that the pair had since forgiven each other. A weak performance in the talent show meant that Montrese was up for elimination in the first episode, but remained confident that her fellow season 5 queen, Roxxxy Andrews would not eliminate her; however, Andrews chose to save Phi Phi O'Hara and Adore Delano, eliminating Montrese first.

In episode 5, a twist was incorporated which allowed eliminated queens to potentially return to the game, the challenge being to pair up with a queen who is still in the game and perform a standup comedy routine. Montrese and partner Phi Phi O'Hara performed badly, meaning Montrese was not eligible to return. Montrese finished in 10th place in All Stars 2.

== Filmography ==
=== Television ===
| Year | Title | Role | Notes | Ref |
|---|---|---|---|---|
| 2013 | Toddlers & Tiaras | Herself | Episode: "Las Vegas: LalapaZOOza" | |
| 2013 | RuPaul's Drag Race (season 5) | Herself | Contestant | |
| 2013 | RuPaul's Drag Race: Untucked | Herself | 10 episodes | |
| 2016 | RuPaul's Drag Race All Stars (season 2) | Herself | Contestant | |
| 2020 | KTNV-TV | Herself | Guest | |
| 2020 | RuPaul's Drag Race: Vegas Revue | Herself | Guest | |
| 2021 | RuPaul's Drag Race All Stars (season 6) | Herself | "Lip Sync Assassin" (episode 1) | |
| 2021 | RuPaul's Drag Race All Stars: Untucked (season 3) | Herself | "Lip Sync Assassin" (episode 1) | |
| 2023 | RuPaul's Drag Race (season 15) | Herself | Special guest; Episode: "Reunited!" | |

=== Web series ===
| Year | Title | Role | Notes | Ref. |
|---|---|---|---|---|
| 2014 | Ring My Bell | Herself | Guest | |
| 2014 | Bestie$ for Ca$h | Herself | Special Guest | |
| 2016 | Queen to Queen | Herself | Guest, with Ginger Minj | |
| 2020 | Hey Qween! | Herself | Guest | |
| 2024 | RuPaul's Drag Race Live Untucked | Herself | WOWPresents Plus original | |

=== Music videos ===
| Year | Title | Artist |
|---|---|---|
| 2016 | "The T" | Alaska Thunderfuck |
| 2020 | "Bitch Please" | Derrick Barry, Nebraska Thunderfuck, & Velo |
