= RuPaul's Drag Race All Stars season 2 =

2016 season of RuPaul's Drag Race All Stars

RuPaul's Drag Race All Stars
- Season 2
- Promotional poster for season two
- Hosted by: RuPaul
- Judges: RuPaul; Michelle Visage; Carson Kressley; Todrick Hall
- No. of contestants: 10
- Winner: Alaska
- Runners-up: Detox; Katya
- No. of episodes: 9

Release
- Original network: Logo TV; VH1
- Original release: August 25 – October 27, 2016

Season chronology
- ← Previous; Season 1 Next → Season 3

The second season of RuPaul's Drag Race All Stars premiered on the Logo network on a new night; Thursday, August 25, 2016. Returning judges included RuPaul, Michelle Visage, with Carson Kressley joining the panel, while the space previously occupied by Ross Mathews was filled by Todrick Hall. Cast members were announced on June 17, 2016. This season featured ten All-Star contestants, selected from the show's second season through to its seventh season, who competed to be inducted into the "Drag Race Hall of Fame".

A new twist was revealed for this season, changing the format of the show. In previous seasons, the bottom two queens had to "Lip-sync for their Life" to avoid elimination. This season had the top two performing queens of the challenge "Lip-sync for their Legacy," with the winner of the lip-sync earning $10,000 and choosing which one of the bottom queens gets eliminated. The prizes for the winner were a one-year supply of Anastasia Beverly Hills cosmetics and a cash prize of $100,000. It is also the first All Stars season to feature Snatch Game, a challenge that debuted in the second season of the regular series.

The winner of the second season of RuPaul's Drag Race All Stars was Alaska, with Detox and Katya being the runners-up.

== Contestants ==
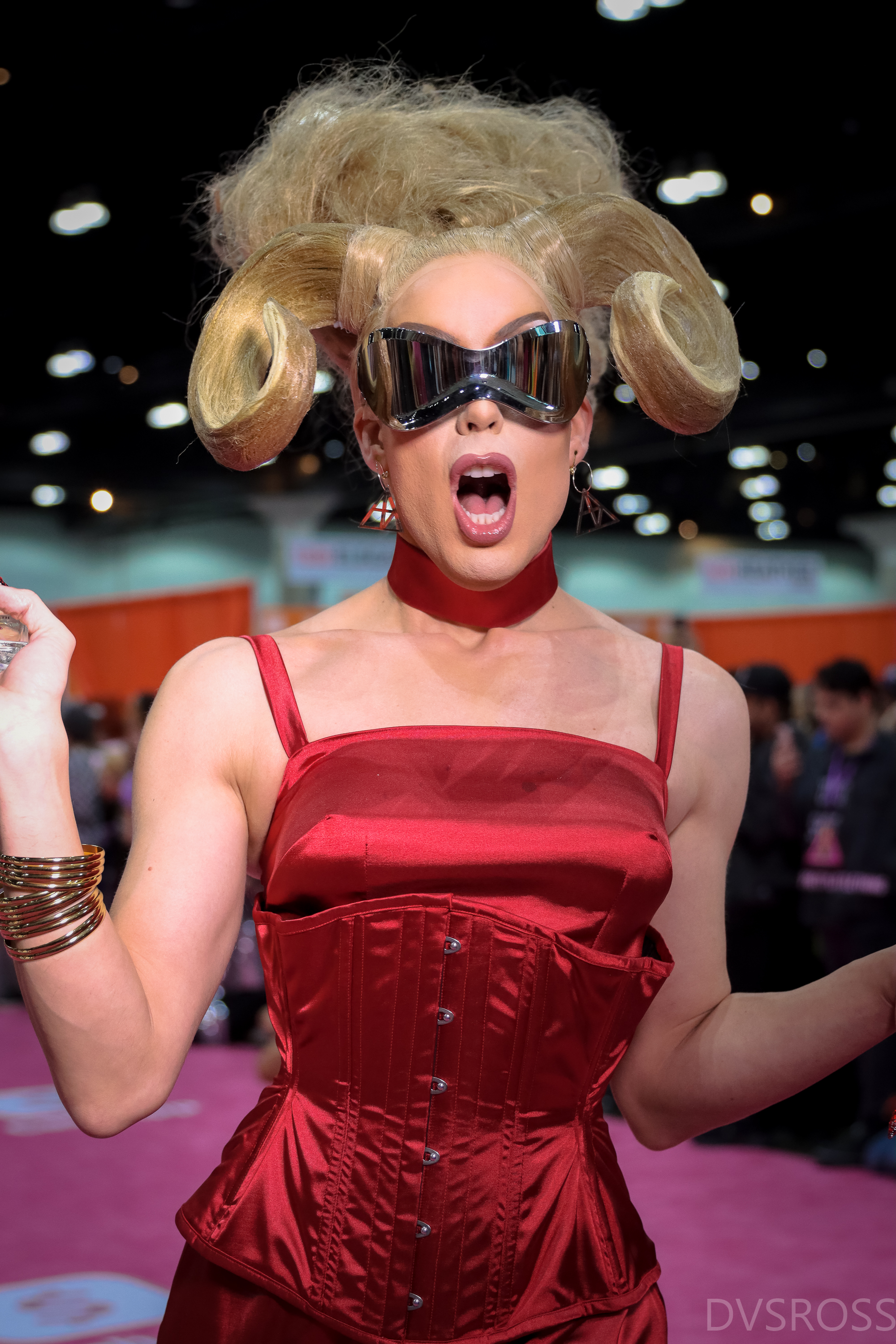
The winner, Alaska.

Ages, names, and cities stated are at time of filming.

Contestants of RuPaul's Drag Race All Stars season 2 and their backgrounds
| Contestant | Age | Hometown | Original season | Original placement | Outcome |
|---|---|---|---|---|---|
| Alaska (Note: Alaska Thunderfuck 5000 is referred to as Alaska on the show.) | 30 | Los Angeles, California | Season 5 | Runner-up | Winner |
| Detox (Note: Detox Icunt is referred to as Detox on the show.) | 30 | Los Angeles, California | Season 5 | 4th place | Runners-up |
| Katya (Note: Yekaterina Petrovna Zamolodchikova is referred to as Katya on the show.) | 33 | Boston, Massachusetts | Season 7 | 5th place (Note: Katya was voted Miss Congeniality on her original season.) | Runners-up |
| Roxxxy Andrews | 31 | Orlando, Florida | Season 5 | Runner-up | 4th place |
| Alyssa Edwards | 35 | Dallas, Texas | Season 5 | 6th place | 5th place (Note: Alyssa Edwards originally placed sixth before re-entering the competition.) |
| Tatianna | 27 | Washington, D.C. | Season 2 | 4th place | 6th place (Note: Tatianna originally placed eighth before re-entering the competition.) |
| Phi Phi O'Hara | 29 | New York City, New York | Season 4 | Runner-up | 7th place |
| Ginger Minj | 31 | Orlando, Florida | Season 7 | Runner-up | 8th place |
| Adore Delano | 25 | Azusa, California | Season 6 | Runner-up | 9th place (Note: Adore Delano quit the competition on episode two.) |
| Coco Montrese | 41 | Las Vegas, Nevada | Season 5 | 5th place | 10th place |

== Contestant progress ==
Legend:

Alaska won RuPaul's Drag Race All Stars season 2.
Detox and Katya were the runners-up.
WIN indicates that the contestant won the challenge and the Lip Sync for Your Legacy.
TOP indicates that the contestant won the challenge, but did not participate in the lip sync.
IN indicates that the contestant won the challenge and the Lip Sync for Your Life, earning re-entry into the competition.
TOP2 indicates that the contestant won the challenge, but lost the Lip Sync for Your Legacy.
SAFE indicates that the contestant was declared safe by the judges.
BTM (Bottom) indicates that the contestant was up for elimination.
ELIM (Eliminated) indicates that the contestant was eliminated.
QUIT indicates that Adore Delano quit the competition.
LOSS indicates that the contestant returned to win re-entry into the competition, but lost.
Guest indicates that the contestant returned as a guest.

Progress of contestants including placements in each episode
| Contestant | Episode | | | | | | | | |
| Contestant | 1 | 2 | 3 | 4 | 5 | 6 | 7 | 8 | 9 |
|---|---|---|---|---|---|---|---|---|---|
| Alaska | SAFE | WIN | SAFE | WIN | TOP | WIN | BTM | Winner | Guest |
| Detox | SAFE | BTM | TOP2 | SAFE | TOP | SAFE | WIN | Runner-up | Guest |
| Katya | SAFE | TOP2 | BTM | BTM | SAFE | TOP2 | TOP2 | Runner-up | Guest |
| Roxxxy Andrews | WIN | BTM | SAFE | BTM | BTM | BTM | BTM | Eliminated | Guest |
| Alyssa Edwards | SAFE | SAFE | WIN | ELIM | IN | SAFE | ELIM | | Guest |
| Tatianna | TOP2 | ELIM | | | IN | ELIM | | | Guest |
| Phi Phi O'Hara | BTM | SAFE | SAFE | TOP2 | ELIM | | | | |
| Ginger Minj | SAFE | SAFE | ELIM | | LOSS | | | | Guest |
| Adore Delano | BTM | QUIT | | | | | | | Guest |
| Coco Montrese | ELIM | | | | LOSS | | | | Guest |

== Lip syncs ==
Legend:

The contestant was eliminated after their first time in the bottom.
The contestant was eliminated after their second time in the bottom.
The contestant won the Lip Sync for the Crown and was declared the winner of the season.

| Episode | Top All Stars (Elimination) | | | Song | Winner(s) | Bottom | Eliminated |
|---|---|---|---|---|---|---|---|
| 1 | Roxxxy Andrews (Coco) | vs. | Tatianna (Coco) | "Shake It Off" (Taylor Swift) | Roxxxy Andrews | Adore, Coco, Phi Phi | Coco Montrese |
| 2 | Alaska (Tatianna) | vs. | Katya (Tatianna) | "Le Freak" (Chic) | Alaska | Detox, Roxxxy, Tatianna | Tatianna |
| 3 | Alyssa Edwards (Ginger) | vs. | Detox (Katya) | "Tell It to My Heart" (Taylor Dayne) | Alyssa Edwards | Ginger, Katya | Ginger Minj |
| 4 | Alaska (Alyssa) | vs. | Phi Phi O'Hara (Alyssa) | "Got to Be Real" (Cheryl Lynn) | Alaska | Alyssa, Katya, Roxxxy | Alyssa Edwards |
| 5 | Alyssa Edwards (Phi Phi) | vs. | Tatianna (Phi Phi) | "Shut Up and Drive" (Rihanna) | Alyssa Edwards | Phi Phi, Roxxxy | Phi Phi O'Hara |
| 5 | Alyssa Edwards (Phi Phi) | vs. | Tatianna (Phi Phi) | "Shut Up and Drive" (Rihanna) | Tatianna | Phi Phi, Roxxxy | Phi Phi O'Hara |
| 6 | Alaska (Tatianna) | vs. | Katya (Roxxxy) | "Cherry Bomb" (Joan Jett and The Blackhearts) | Alaska | Roxxxy, Tatianna | Tatianna |
| 7 | Detox (Alyssa) | vs. | Katya (Roxxxy) | "Step It Up" (RuPaul ft. Dave Audé) | Detox | Alaska, Alyssa, Roxxxy | Alyssa Edwards |
| Episode | Final All Stars | | | Song | Winner | | |
| 8 | Alaska vs. Detox vs. Katya | | | "If I Were Your Woman" (Gladys Knight & the Pips) | Alaska | | |

== Guest judges ==
Listed in chronological order:

- Raven-Symoné, actress, comedian, singer and model
- Ross Mathews, comedian and television personality
- Jeremy Scott, fashion designer
- Nicole Scherzinger, singer and actress
- Graham Norton, television and radio personality
- Aubrey Plaza, actress and comedian

=== Special guests ===
Guests who appeared in episodes, but did not judge on the main stage:

Episode 2

- Raven, runner up from season two and season one of All Stars
- Jujubee, contestant from season two and season one of All Stars
- Shangela, contestant from season two and three.
- Bianca Del Rio, winner of season six

Episode 4

- Big Freedia, actor and singer
- Victoria "Porkchop" Parker, contestant from season one

Episode 5

- Chad Michaels, runner-up from season four and winner of season one of All Stars
- Victoria "Porkchop" Parker, contestant from season one
- Chelsea Peretti, actress and comedian
- Jessica Wild, contestant from season two
- Mystique Summers Madison, contestant from season two
- Nicole Paige Brooks, contestant from season two
- Sonique, contestant from season two
- Alexis Mateo, contestant from season three and season one of All Stars
- Mariah Paris Balenciaga, contestant from season three
- Yara Sofia, contestant from season three and season one of All Stars
- Jiggly Caliente, contestant from season four
- Madame LaQueer, contestant from season four
- Monica Beverly Hillz, contestant from season five
- Vivienne Pinay, contestant from season five
- Gia Gunn, contestant from season six
- Kelly Mantle, contestant from season six
- Laganja Estranja, contestant from season six
- Trinity K. Bonet, contestant from season six
- Vivacious, contestant on season six
- Jaidynn Diore Fierce, contestant from season seven
- Mrs. Kasha Davis, contestant from season seven

Episode 6

- Marcus Lemonis, investor, television personality and philanthropist

Episode 7

- Anastasia Soare, owner of Anastasia Beverly Hills cosmetics

== Episodes ==
| No. overall | No. in season | Title | Original release date |
|---|---|---|---|
| 7 | 1 | "All Star Talent Show Extravaganza" | August 25, 2016 |
Ten all-stars enter the workroom. For the first mini-challenge, the queens will read each other to filth. Alaska wins the mini-challenge. For the main challenge, the queens will perform a talent show in front of the judges and a live audience.: Adore Delano - Live singing; Alaska - Live singing; Alyssa Edwards - Variety; Coco Montrese - Dancing; Detox - Live singing; Ginger Minj - Live singing; Katya - Gymnastics; Phi Phi O'Hara - A Capella; Roxxxy Andrews - Burlesque; Tatianna - Spoken word; On the runway, RuPaul shocks the queens, telling them that she will not be eliminating anyone this competition. Instead, the queens will eliminate each other. The top two queens of the challenge will Lip-Sync for Your Legacy. The winner of the lip-sync will then choose someone in the bottom to eliminate from the competition. Alaska, Ginger Minj, Roxxxy Andrews and Tatianna receive positive critiques, with Roxxxy Andrews and Tatianna being announced as the top two. Adore Delano, Coco Montrese and Phi Phi O'Hara receive negative critiques, and are announced as the bottom three. Roxxxy Andrews and Tatianna lip-sync to "Shake It Off" by Taylor Swift. Roxxxy Andrews wins the lip-sync and decides to eliminate Coco Montrese from the competition.: Guest Judge: Raven-Symoné; Mini-Challenge: Reading is Fundamental; Mini-Challenge Winner: Alaska; Mini-Challenge Prize: A $2,000 shopping spree to L.A. Eyeworks; Main Challenge: Perform a talent show in front of the judges and a live audience; Top Two: Roxxxy Andrews and Tatianna; Challenge Prize: A collection of jewelry from Fierce Drag Jewels; Lip-Sync Song: "Shake It Off" by Taylor Swift; Lip-Sync for Your Legacy Winner: Roxxxy Andrews; Bottom Three: Adore Delano, Coco Montrese and Phi Phi O'Hara; Eliminated: Coco Montrese; Farewell Message: "WE ARE ALLSTARS! ♡ Coco Montrese"
| 8 | 2 | "All Stars Snatch Game" | September 1, 2016 |
At the beginning of the episode, Tatianna reveals that she would have sent home Coco Montrese from the competition, had she won the lip-sync. For this week's main challenge, the queens will play the Snatch Game. While getting ready for the Snatch Game, Adore Delano reveals that she will be withdrawing from the competition. Jujubee and Raven star as the celebrity contestants. The cast consisted of: Alaska as Mae West; Alyssa Edwards as Joan Crawford; Detox as Nancy Grace; Ginger Minj as Tammy Faye; Katya as Björk; Phi Phi O'Hara as Theresa Caputo; Roxxxy Andrews as Alaska; Tatianna as Ariana Grande; On the runway, category is Latex Eleganza. Alaska, Katya and Phi Phi O'Hara receive positive critiques, with Alaska and Katya being announced as the top two. Detox, Roxxxy Andrews and Tatianna receive negative critiques, and are announced as the bottom three. Alaska and Katya lip-sync to "Le Freak" by Chic. Alaska wins the lip-sync and decides to eliminate Tatianna from the competition.: Guest Judge: Ross Mathews; Main Challenge: Snatch Game; Quit: Adore Delano; Runway Theme: Latex Eleganza; Top Two: Alaska and Katya; Challenge Prize: Two VIP tickets to Cirque du Soleil cabaret "Zumanity", including airfare and accommodations.; Lip-Sync Song: "Le Freak" by Chic; Lip-Sync for Your Legacy Winner: Alaska; Bottom Three: Detox, Roxxxy Andrews, and Tatianna; Eliminated: Tatianna; Farewell Message: "Thank You! ♡ Tati"
| 9 | 3 | "HERstory of the World" | September 8, 2016 |
At the beginning of the episode, Katya reveals that she would have sent home Tatianna from the competition, had she won the lip-sync. For this week's main challenge, the queens will perform a lip-syncing dance number dedicated to legendary historical women.: Alaska as Eve; Alyssa Edwards as Annie Oakley; Detox as Marie Antoinette; Ginger Minj as Catherine the Great; Katya as Diana, Princess of Wales; Phi Phi O'Hara as Helen of Troy; Roxxxy Andrews as Eva Perón; On the runway, category is Future of Drag. Alyssa Edwards and Detox receive positive critiques, and are announced as the top two. Ginger Minj and Katya receive negative critiques, and are announced as the bottom two. Alyssa Edwards and Detox lip-sync to "Tell It To My Heart" by Taylor Dayne. Alyssa Edwards wins the lip-sync and decides to eliminate Ginger Minj from the competition.: Guest Judge: Jeremy Scott; Main Challenge: Perform a lip-syncing dance number dedicated to legendary historical women; Runway Theme: Future of Drag; Top Two: Alyssa Edwards and Detox; Challenge Prize: A three-night getaway to Palm Springs, California; Lip-Sync Song: "Tell It To My Heart" by Taylor Dayne; Lip-Sync for Your Legacy Winner: Alyssa Edwards; Bottom Two: Ginger Minj and Katya; Eliminated: Ginger Minj; Farewell Message: "If men can look this good, there's no excuse for ugly women! ♡ The Minj"
| 10 | 4 | "Drag Movie Shequels" | September 15, 2016 |
At the beginning of the episode, Detox reveals that she would have sent home Katya from the competition, had she won the lip-sync. For this week's main challenge, the queens will pair up and act in a parody movie sequel from one of RuPaul's favorite movies.: Wha' Ha' Happened to Baby JJ? - Alaska and Alyssa Edwards; Velma & Weezy - Detox and Katya; Showsquirrels - Phi Phi O'Hara and Roxxxy Andrews; On the runway, category is Two Looks in One. Alaska and Phi Phi O'Hara receive positive critiques, and are announced as the top two. Alyssa Edwards, Katya and Roxxxy Andrews receive negative critiques, and are announced as the bottom three. Alaska and Phi Phi O'Hara lip-sync to "Got to Be Real" by Cheryl Lynn. Alaska wins the lip-sync and decides to eliminate Alyssa Edwards from the competition.: Guest Judge: Nicole Scherzinger; Main Challenge: In pairs, act in a parody movie sequel from one of RuPaul's favorite movies; Runway Theme: Two Looks in One; Top Two: Alaska and Phi Phi O'Hara; Challenge Prize: A $1,000 shopping spree to Fabric Planet; Lip-Sync Song: "Got to Be Real" by Cheryl Lynn; Lip-Sync for Your Legacy Winner: Alaska; Bottom Three: Alyssa Edwards, Katya, and Roxxxy Andrews; Eliminated: Alyssa Edwards; Farewell Message: "ITS NOT Personell (sic)...its DRAG! PS Log Off Always & Forever Alyssa E 💋"
| 11 | 5 | "Revenge of the Queens" | September 22, 2016 |
At the beginning of the episode, the previously eliminated queens all return to the workroom. Phi Phi O'Hara reveals that she would have sent home Alyssa Edwards from the competition, had she won the lip-sync. For this week's main challenge, the queens will perform a live stand-up comedy routine partnered with a previous eliminated queen. Alyssa Edwards picks Alaska, Ginger Minj picks Katya, Tatianna picks Detox and Coco Montrese picks Phi Phi O'Hara. Roxxxy Andrews is alone, and will be the narrator of the show. On the runway, Alaska & Alyssa Edwards and Detox & Tatianna receive positive critiques, and win the challenge. It is then announced that Alyssa Edwards and Tatianna are the top two, and will lip-sync to return to the competition. Whichever queen wins the lip-sync, will then have the opportunity to eliminate one of the remaining queens. Phi Phi O'Hara and Roxxxy Andrews receive negative critiques, and are announced as the bottom two. Alyssa Edwards and Tatianna lip-sync to "Shut Up and Drive" by Rihanna. Alyssa Edwards and Tatianna win the lip-sync and officially return to the competition. Alyssa Edwards and Tatianna both decide to eliminate Phi Phi O'Hara from the competition.: Guest Judge: Ross Mathews; Main Challenge: Perform a live stand-up comedy routine partnered with a previous eliminated queen; Winners: Alaska & Alyssa Edwards and Detox & Tatianna; Top Two: Alyssa Edwards and Tatianna; Main Challenge Prize: Couture Gown from SNL Designs; Lip-sync Song: "Shut Up and Drive" by Rihanna; Lip-Sync for Your Legacy Winners: Alyssa Edwards and Tatianna; Returned: Alyssa Edwards and Tatianna; Bottom Two: Phi Phi O'Hara and Roxxxy Andrews; Eliminated: Phi Phi O'Hara; Farewell Message: "I wanted to avoid hugs because of tears! LOVE YOU ALL! "Jump in a car!" - Phi Phi"
| 12 | 6 | "Drag Fish Tank" | September 29, 2016 |
For this week's mini-challenge, the queens will play a game of beastly golf. Alaska wins the mini-challenge. For the main challenge, the queens will create drag-influenced products.: Alaska - Alaska Thunderfun Fashion Tape; Alyssa Edwards - Drop Dead Gorgeous Energy Drink; Detox - Detox's Talking Trash Receptacle; Katya - Krisis Kontrol by Katya; Roxxxy Andrews - Roxxxy's Wig Tricks Instructional DVD + Roxxxy Andrews Extra-Tacky Wig Glue!; Tatianna - Spill the Tea... with Tati Designer Tea Set; On the runway, category is Pants. Alaska and Katya receive positive critiques, and are announced as the top two. Roxxxy Andrews and Tatianna receive negative critiques, and are announced as the bottom two. Alaska and Katya lip-sync to "Cherry Bomb" by Joan Jett & The Blackhearts. Alaska wins the lip-sync and decides to eliminate Tatianna from the competition.: Guest Judge: Graham Norton; Mini-Challenge: Play a game of beastly golf; Mini-Challenge Winner: Alaska; Mini-Challenge Prize: A $2,000 prize package from Klein Epstein and Parker; Main Challenge: Create drag-influenced products; Runway Theme: Pants; Top Two: Alaska and Katya; Challenge Prize: A custom wig wardrobe from Weaven Steven, and have their merchandise sold at RuPaul's Drag Con; Lip-Sync Song: "Cherry Bomb" by Joan Jett & The Blackhearts; Lip-Sync for Your Legacy Winner: Alaska; Bottom Two: Roxxxy Andrews and Tatianna; Eliminated: Tatianna; Farewell Message: "Had a BLAST! I Love you ALL! They got me Gurl! Lol Thankx! ♡ Tati"
| 13 | 7 | "Family That Drags Together" | October 6, 2016 |
At the beginning of the episode, Katya reveals that she would have sent home Roxxxy Andrews from the competition, had she won the lip-sync. For this week's main challenge, the queens will makeover a family member. On the runway, Detox and Katya receive positive critiques, and are announced as the top two. Alaska, Alyssa Edwards and Roxxxy Andrews receive negative critiques, and are announced as the bottom three. Detox and Katya lip-sync to "Step It Up" by RuPaul. Detox wins the lip-sync and decides to eliminate Alyssa Edwards from the competition.: Guest Judge: Aubrey Plaza; Main Challenge: Makeover a family member; Top Two: Detox and Katya; Challenge Prize: A $2,000 gift certificate from Marc Jacobs; Lip-Sync Song: "Step It Up" by RuPaul; Lip-Sync for Your Legacy Winner: Detox; Bottom Three: Alaska, Alyssa Edwards, and Roxxxy Andrews; Eliminated: Alyssa Edwards; Farewell Message: "Imagine, create & inspire! ♡ you all! Always & forever, Alyssa Edwards, All Stars."
| 14 | 8 | "All Stars Supergroup" | October 13, 2016 |
At the beginning of the episode, Katya reveals that she would have sent home Roxxxy Andrews from the competition, had she won the lip-sync. For the final challenge of the season, the queens will write, record, and perform their own verses to RuPaul's song "Read U Wrote U". On the runway, Roxxxy Andrews is eliminated, leaving Alaska, Detox and Katya as the top three queens of the season. They lip-sync to "If I Were Your Woman" by Gladys Knight & the Pips. It is revealed that Alaska is the winner, leaving Detox and Katya as the runners-up.: Main Challenge: Write, record, and perform their own verses to RuPaul's song "Read U Wrote U"; Eliminated: Roxxxy Andrews; Final Three: Alaska, Detox and Katya; Lip-Sync Song: "If I Were Your Woman" by Gladys Knight & the Pips; Runners-up: Detox and Katya; Winner of RuPaul's Drag Race All Stars Season Two: Alaska
| 15 | 9 | "Reunited" | October 27, 2016 |
The queens all return for the reunion, minus Phi Phi O'Hara. Discussions include, the Lip-Sync for Your Legacy format, Coco Montrese's health before the recording of the show, Adore Delano quitting the competition, Tatianna's eliminations, Alaska's tantrum, and the eliminated queen's returning for their revenge.

== Reception ==
The second season of RuPaul's Drag Race All Stars was met with critical acclaim and is generally considered to be the best season in the show's history. Vox described the season as "the best — and most self-aware" season of Drag Race. Gay Times ranked it as the number-one season, specifically shouting out Alyssa Edwards and Tatianna's lipsync to "Shut Up and Drive" as a standout moment, also describing the season as having the "best cast in the show's HERstory". Elite Daily ranked it as the second-best season, behind only season four. Ryan Shea of Instinct also ranked it as the second-best season, describing Alaska's win as "triumphant". Additional praise was given to Alaska's win, with Entertainment Weekly ranking her as the third-best RuPaul's Drag Race winner, only behind Trixie Mattel and Bianca Del Rio in 2018. In a 2020 GoldDerby forum, fans voted Alaska as the favorite All Star winner, receiving over 40% of the votes.

=== Ratings ===
| Episode no. | Title | Airdate | Logo Viewers | Logo Ratings (18-49) | VH1 Viewers | VH1 Ratings (18-49) | Total Viewers |
|---|---|---|---|---|---|---|---|
| 1 | "All Star Talent Show Extravaganza" | August 25, 2016 | 283,000 | 0.14 | 301,000 | 0.13 | 584,000 |
| 2 | "All Stars Snatch Game" | September 1, 2016 | 240,000 | 0.12 | 385,000 | 0.18 | 625,000 |
| 3 | "HERstory Of The World" | September 8, 2016 | 230,000 | 0.12 | 258,000 | 0.12 | 484,000 |
| 4 | "Drag Movie Shequels" | September 15, 2016 | 226,000 | 0.12 | 335,000 | 0.14 | 561,000 |
| 5 | "Revenge of the Queens" | September 22, 2016 | 386,000 | 0.21 | N/A | N/A | 386,000 |
| 6 | "Drag Fish Tank" | September 29, 2016 | 292,000 | 0.17 | 313,000 | 0.15 | 605,000 |
| 7 | "Family That Drags Together" | October 6, 2016 | 266,000 | 0.14 | 270,000 | 0.13 | 536,000 |
| 8 | "All Stars Supergroup" | October 13, 2016 | 243,000 | 0.14 | 303,000 | 0.12 | 546,000 |
| 9 | "Reunited" | October 27, 2016 | 166,000 | 0.09 | N/A | N/A | N/A |

== See also ==
- List of Rusicals
