= Roxxxy Andrews =

American drag performer and artist

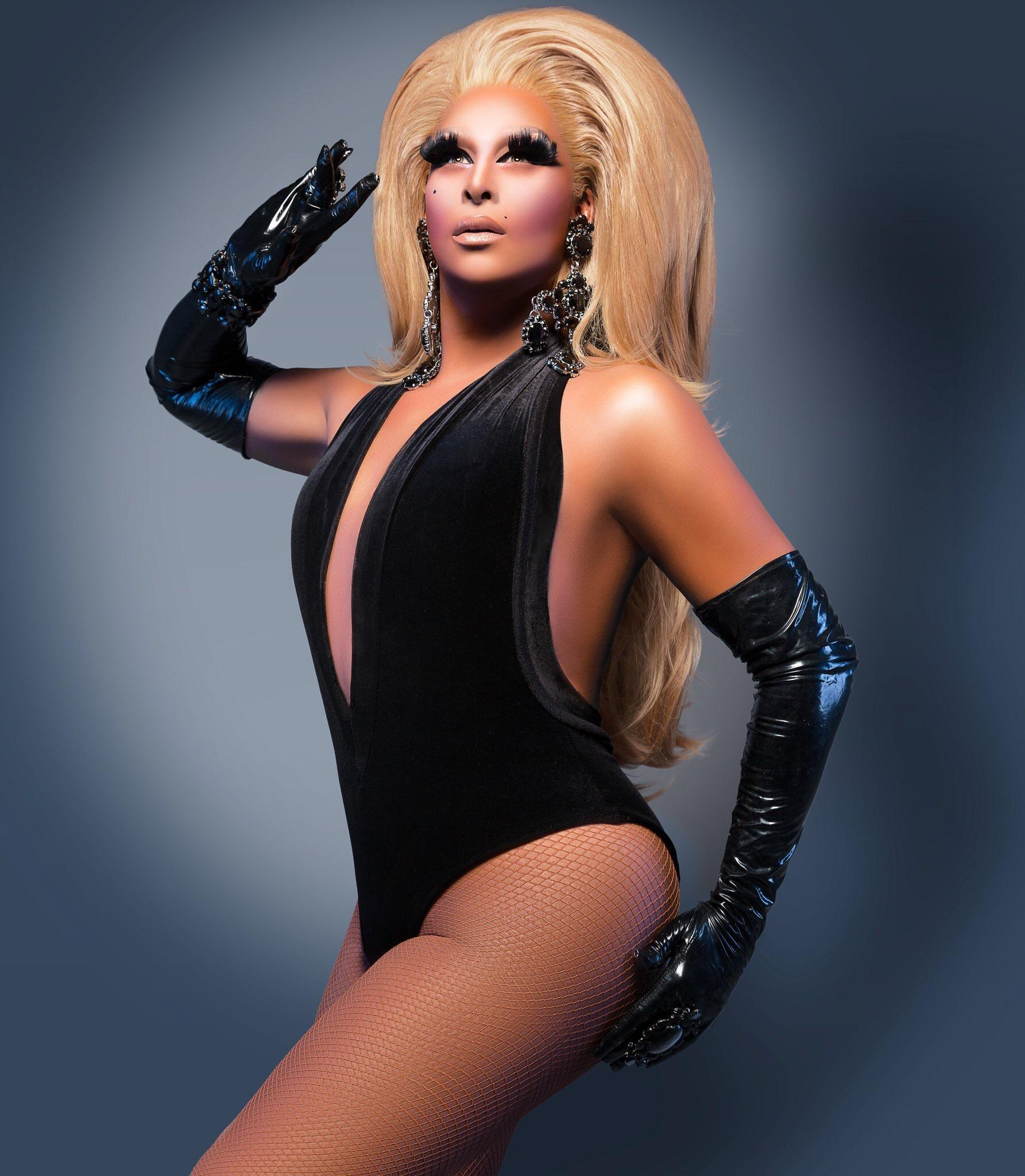
- Roxxxy Andrews
- Born: Michael W. Feliciano; September 23, 1983 (age 42); North Miami Beach, Florida, U.S.
- Occupation: Drag Performer
- Television: RuPaul's Drag Race (season 5); RuPaul's Drag Race All Stars (season 2, season 9)
- Website: roxxxy-andrews.com

Michael W. Feliciano, known by their stage name Roxxxy Andrews (born September 23, 1983), is an American drag performer who came to international attention for being a contestant on the fifth season of RuPaul's Drag Race and the second and ninth seasons of RuPaul's Drag Race All Stars.

== Life and career ==
Feliciano grew up in North Miami Beach, Florida. He is of Puerto Rican and Cuban-American ancestry. He revealed on Drag Race that his mother abandoned him and his sister at a bus stop as a child. They were raised by their grandmother, Sonja, who appeared on episode 7 of Drag Race All Stars 2 for a makeover challenge.

Roxxxy is a member of the Haus of Andrews, founded by 1986 Miss Continental winner Tandi Andrews (1964–1995). Roxxxy's drag mother was Erica Andrews (1969–2013). Roxxxy's drag career began in Orlando at Parliament House and Pulse nightclubs and later began competing in the drag pageantry system. Andrews won Miss Continental Plus in 2010.

In November 2012, Logo announced that Feliciano was among 14 drag queens who would be competing on the fifth season of RuPaul's Drag Race. As Roxxxy Andrews, Feliciano won the first main challenge of the season in "RuPaullywood or Bust" and the make-over challenge in "Super Troopers". In the episode "RuPaul Roast", Roxxxy lip-synced against Alyssa Edwards to Willow Smith's "Whip My Hair". In the lip-sync, Roxxxy pulled off her wig to reveal another wig underneath. RuPaul decided not to eliminate either queen. RuPaul later declared that it was the best lip-sync battle ever. Throughout the series, Roxxxy expressed annoyance at how "comedy queens" who were "unpolished" were winning challenges and not going home, an opinion often directed toward Jinkx Monsoon, which resulted in backlash from viewers. In May 2013, during the reunion Jinkx Monsoon was crowned "America's Next Drag Superstar" while Roxxxy and Alaska Thunderfuck 5000 were declared runners-up.

In June 2016, it was announced that Roxxxy would return to Rupaul's Drag Race for the second season of All Stars. During the first episode, "All Star Talent Show Extravaganza", Andrews became the first contestant in the show's history to win the first challenge on both seasons they appeared in. Andrews also became the first contestant in the show's history to survive being in the bottom five times, making it to the season's finale, and ultimately placing fourth.

Feliciano started drag at Pulse, the gay nightclub where the Orlando nightclub shooting took place on June 12, 2016. Three days later, on June 15, he shared to Instagram a new tattoo that he got in honor of the 49 lives lost and 53 wounded in the shooting. The tattoo is of Pulse's logo with a red heartbeat line drawn through the middle.

In July 2020, she returned to the fifth season of RuPaul's Drag Race All Stars as a Lip-Sync Assassin.

On April 23, 2024, Andrews was announced as one of the eight contestants competing on the ninth season of RuPaul's Drag Race All Stars. She placed runner-up to Angeria Paris VanMicheals, along with Vanessa Vanjie.

== Titles ==
- Miss Metropolitan Continental Plus 2008, winner
- Miss Gay Florida USofA at Large 2009, second alternate
- Miss West Virginia Continental Plus 2009, winner
- Miss Shining Star Continental Plus 2010, winner
- Miss Continental Plus 2010, winner
- Miss West Virginia Continental 2012, winner
- Miss Gay Southernmost USofA 2015, first alternate
- Miss Angel City Continental 2019, winner

== Filmography ==
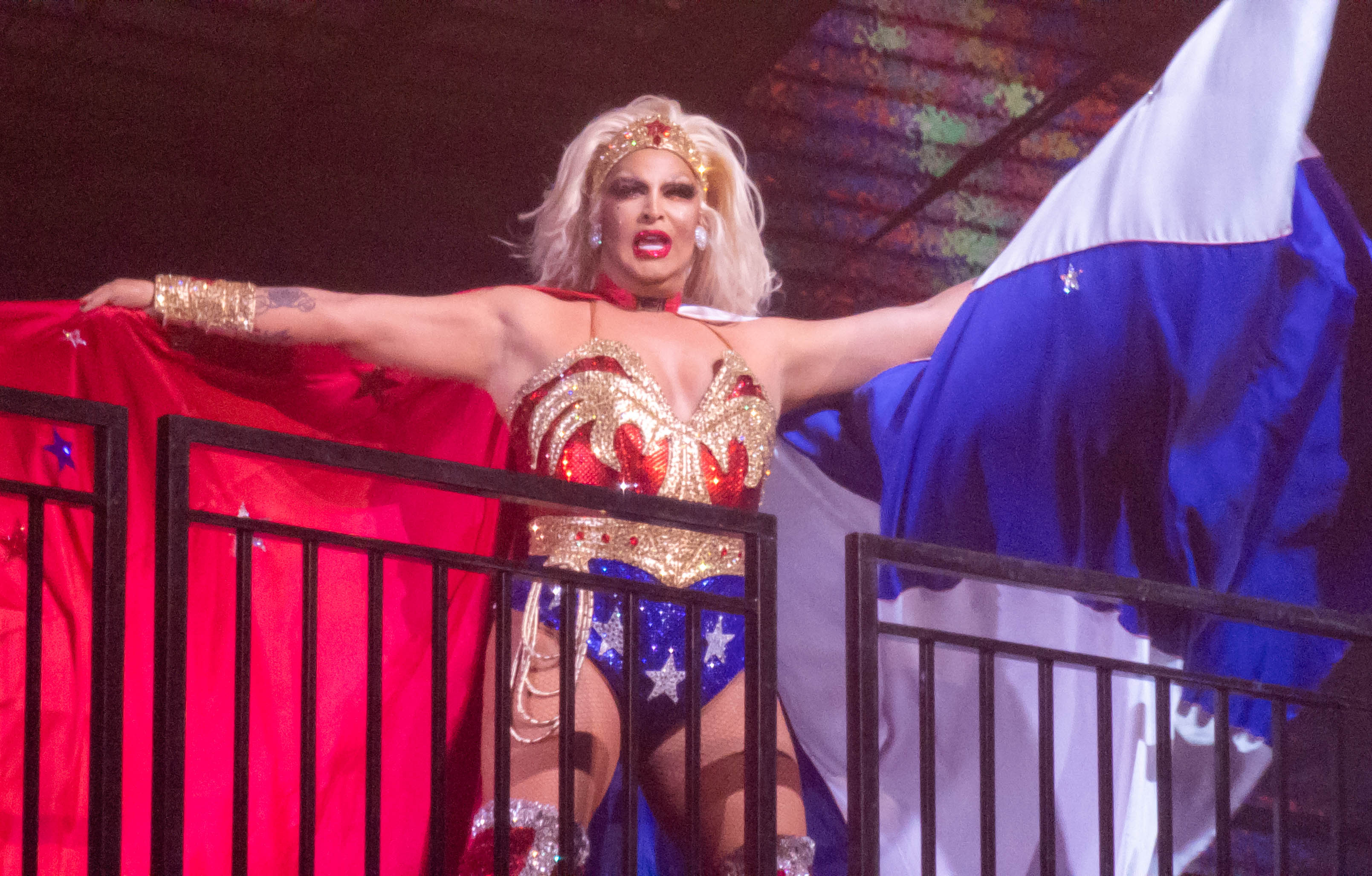
Andrews performing as part of the RuPaul's Drag Race All Stars tour, 2024

=== Movies ===
Year	Title	Role	Ref
2020	The Queens	Herself	

=== Television ===
Year	Title	Role	Notes
2013	RuPaul's Drag Race	Contestant	Season 5, Runner-up
2013	RuPaul's Drag Race: Untucked	Herself	Season 4
2016	RuPaul's Drag Race All Stars	Contestant	Season 2, 4th place
2020	RuPaul's Drag Race All Stars (season 5)	Herself	Guest (“Lipsync Assassin”); Episode: "The Charles Family Backyard Ball"
2020	RuPaul's Drag Race All Stars: Untucked (season 2)	Herself	Guest (“Lipsync Assassin”); Episode: "The Charles Family Backyard Ball"
2024	RuPaul's Drag Race All Stars (season 9)	Contestant	Runner-Up
2024	RuPaul's Drag Race All Stars: Untucked	Herself	Runner-Up

=== Web series ===
Year	Title	Role	Notes	Ref.
2013	Ring My Bell	Herself	Guest	
2017	Queen to Queen	Herself	Guest, with Detox Icunt	
