= The Ross Mathews Roast =

- RuPaul's Drag Race episode
- Episode no.: Season 14; Episode 13
- Presented by: RuPaul
- Original air date: April 1, 2022

Guest appearances
- Dulcé Sloan (guest judge); Norvina (guest)

Episode chronology
← Previous "Moulin Ru: The Rusical"	Next → "Catwalk"

"The Ross Mathews Roast" is the thirteenth episode of the fourteenth season of the American television series RuPaul's Drag Race. It originally aired on April 1, 2022. The episode's main challenge tasks the contestants with performing in a roast of Ross Mathews. Dulcé Sloan is a guest judge. Norvina of Anastasia Beverly Hills also makes a guest appearance to assist with the mini-challenge. Bosco wins the episode's main challenge. DeJa Skye and Jorgeous are both eliminated from the competition, after placing in the bottom three and losing a lip-sync contest against Daya Betty.

== Episode ==
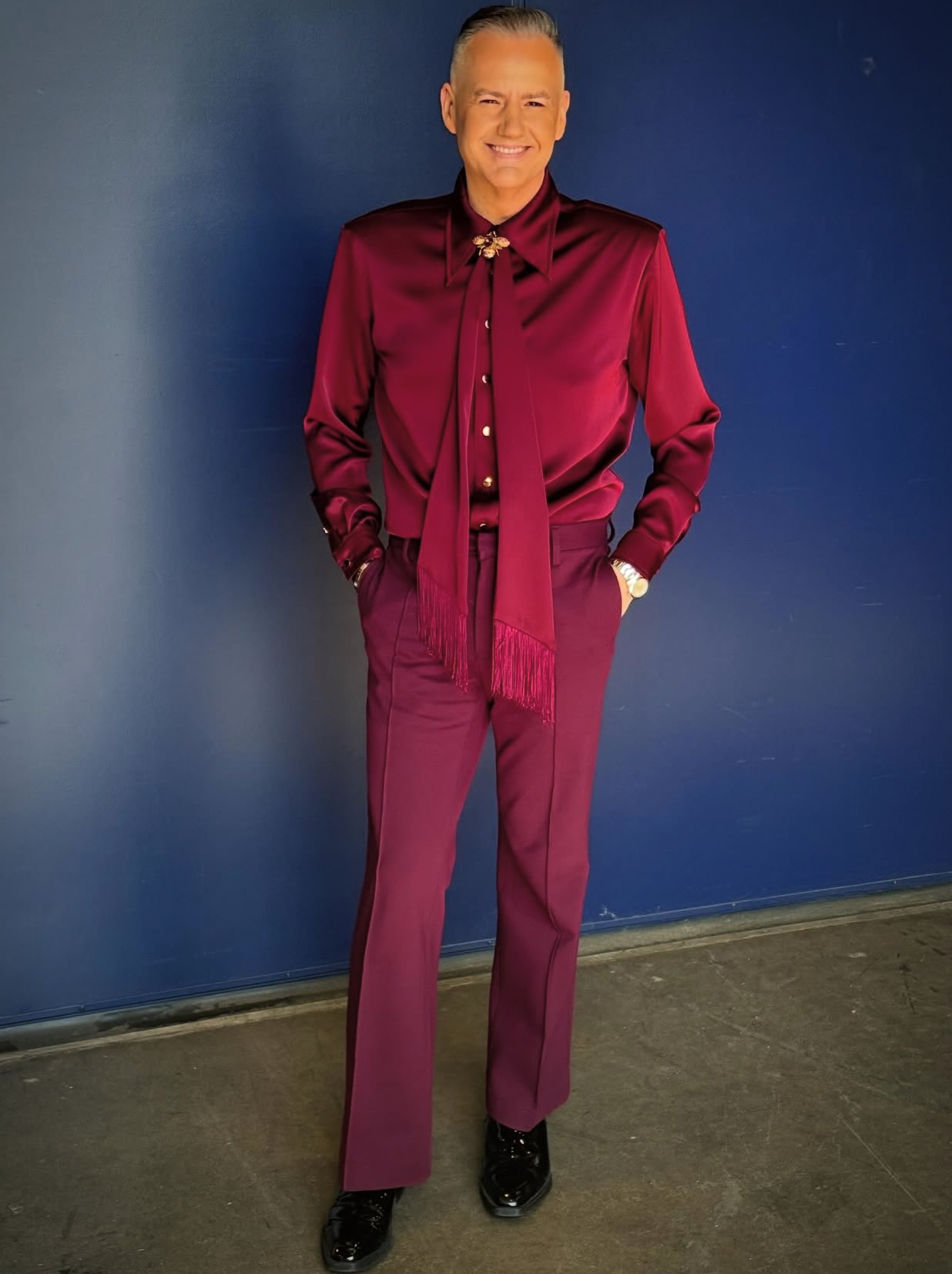
The episode's main challenge tasks the contestants with roasting judge Ross Mathews (pictured in 2025).

The contestants return to the Werk Room after no one was eliminated on the previous episode. On a new day, RuPaul greets the group and invites Norvina from Anastasia Beverly Hills to assist with the mini-challenge. The group move to a nearby studio, where RuPaul reveals the mini-challenge. The contestants are tasked with teaming up and painting a mural of either Dolly Parton or RuPaul, inspired by the mural of Dolly Parton and RuPaul in Asheville, North Carolina. Team Dolly Parton includes Bosco, Daya Betty, Lady Camden, and Willow Pill. Team RuPaul includes Angeria Paris VanMicheals, DeJa Skye, and Jorgeous. Team Dolly Parton wins the mini-challenge.

Back in the Werk Room, RuPaul reveals the main challenge, which tasks the contestants with performing stand-up comedy in a roast of Ross Mathews. As the winners of the mini-challenge, the contestants on Team Dolly Parton get to decide the show order. The contestants share their preferred placement, then Team Dolly Parton decide the order. The contestants start to write their jokes and scripts, then rehearse individually with Michelle Visage and Dulcé Sloan on the main stage.

On elimination day, the contestants make final preparations in the Werk Room for the comedy and fashion shows. On the main stage, RuPaul welcomes fellow judges Visage and Mathews, as well as guest judge Sloan. RuPaul shares the assignment, then the roast commences. RuPaul shares the runway category ("Tutu Much"), then the fashion show begins. After the contestants present their looks, the judges deliver their critiques, deliberate, then share the results with the group. Angeria Paris VanMicheals, Bosco, Lady Camden, and Willow Pill receive positive critiques, and Bosco wins the challenge. Daya Betty, DeJa Skye, and Jorgeous receive negative critiques, and are announced as the bottom three. The bottom three face off in a lip-sync contest to "Good 4 U" (2021) by Olivia Rodrigo. Daya Betty wins the lip-sync and DeJa Skye and Jorgeous are eliminated from the competition.

== Production and broadcast ==
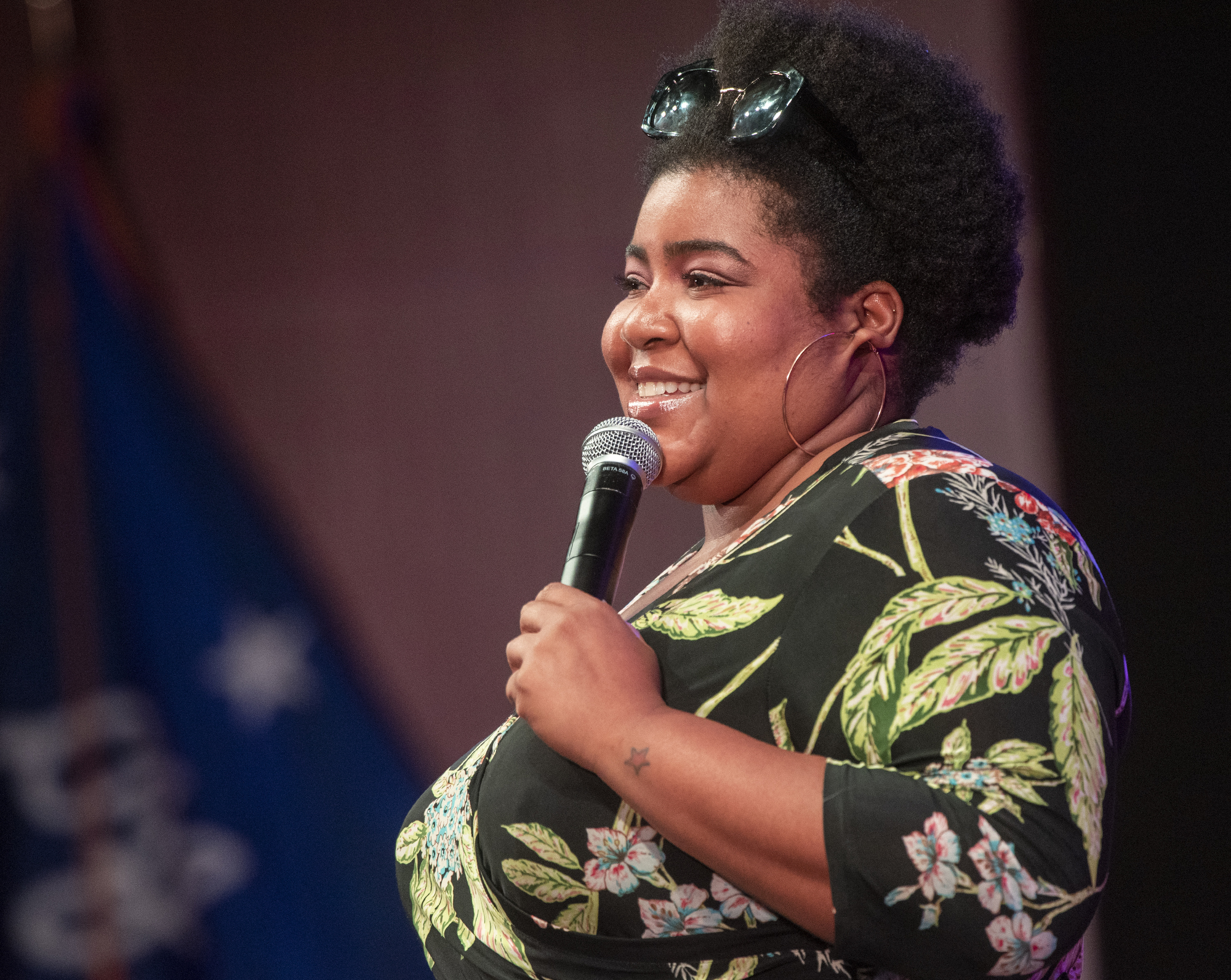
Dulcé Sloan is a guest judge.

The episode originally aired on April 1, 2022. During the roast, the contestants make fun of each other and the judges, including RuPaul. DeJa Skye laughed at many of her competitors' jokes as a form of support.

The episode was the show's first to have two contestants eliminated after a three-way lip-sync contest. After being eliminated, Jorgeous says, "I'm going to smoke a fat ass blunt."

Season contestants Alyssa Hunter, Jasmine Kennedie, June Jambalaya, and Maddy Morphosis shared on social media what they had planned to wear for the episode's runway, had they still been in the competition.

=== Fashion ===
For the fashion show, the contestants wear tutus. Bosco has a red-and-white ballerina-inspired outfit with saw blades. Jorgeous has a blue dress with a black leather jacket and matching boots and hat. Willow Pill has a black-and-white outfit with pink boots and gloves. Angeria Paris Van Michaels wears a lime green outfit and a blonde wig. Daya Betty's pink outfit include a jacket, platform shoes, and a crown. DeJa Skype has a light blue dress and a pink wig. Lady Camden has a pink ballerina-inspired outfit and a matching wig.

== Reception ==
Trae DeLellis of The A.V. Club gave the episode a rating of 'B'. Paul McCallion of Vulture rated the episode four out of five stars. Michael Cuby of Nylon said that during the lip-sync Daya Betty "seemed to get the song in a way her competitors didn't".

== See also ==
- Dolly Parton as a gay icon
