= Cameron Hawthorn =

- Born: United States
- Origin: Andover, Kansas
- Genres: Country; Americana; pop; electronic
- Occupations: singer; songwriter
- Years active: 2017–present
- Label: Independent
- Website: www.cameronhawthorn.com

Cameron Hawthorn is an American singer and songwriter. Rooted in the country genre, his music blends elements of pop, Americana, and electronic dance music.

He's best known for his country single "Dancing in the Living Room", and its pro-LGBTQ+ music video which were met with positive reviews by country and LGBTQ+ music outlets alike.

As of 2025, Hawthorn's entire discography has been released independently. He has released two extended plays, and one studio album. His debut studio album, Church of the Outlaws was officially released on June 27, 2025. He has collaborated with musicians Bright Light Bright Light, Byron Hill, and Goldhouse.

== Music career ==
=== Early life ===
Cameron Hawthorn was born in Andover, Kansas. His family is originally from Oklahoma. Hawthorn has expressed being into music from a young age, saying: "I grew up on Country music." He stated in interviews for The Property Lovers and Music Musings & Such that he "grew up doing a lot of musical theater and learned piano pretty young" and that he started songwriting when he was in high-school.

=== 2017-2020: Debut and Mustang ===
Before starting his career as a solo artist in 2017, he worked as a songwriter for visual media in Los Angeles. Hawthorn uploaded on his YouTube channel a music video for his first song "Mama's Love" on May 9, 2017. The song was included on his self-titled debut extended play, which was self-released on November 17, of the same year.

His big breakthrough came out with the release of his 2019 single "Dancing in the Living Room", the song and its music video received critical praise, and coverage from both queer and country media outlets. His follow-up single "Oh Hot Damn!" was released as a single on April 30, along with a remix by American electronic dance producer Goldhouse. His follow-up single "To Break Hers" was released on September 4. Both tracks received positive reviews.

On October 9, Hawthorn released his second extended play, titled Mustang which includes the singles "Dancing in the Living Room", "To Break Hers" and "Oh Hot Damn!". The EP was met with positive reviews by music critics, who praised Hawthorn's persona, and storytelling. Z-side's of Medium stated that Hawthorn "take(s) note from the macho man feeling of similar songs from the past, but with a clear twist thats refreshing to hear."

=== 2021-2023: Stand-alone singles ===
On 2021, Hawthorn released two stand-alone singles: "Love at First Sight" was released alongside its visualizer on August 26, and "Dreamland" on October 8, and its music video on November 12. In 2022, he released two singles: "Nothing Like a Cowboy" on April 22, and "Country Boy Two-Steps" on August 12, which became his first collaboration with Welsh singer-songwriter Bright Light Bright Light, and his first song to feature dance music elements.

On 2023, Hawthorn released three singles: an original track titled "Lone Star" on May 19, and two covers: "Desperado" a cover of the Eagles song on June 23, and "Spell on You" on October 27, which is a cover of "I Put a Spell on You" by Screamin' Jay Hawkins.

=== 2024–present: New music and Church of the Outlaws ===
On 2024, Hawthorn started teasing music from his upcoming debut album with the singles "Outlaw", "Natural", and "Midnight Rider". All three singles were met with positive reviews for its blend of country with electronic dance music. He confirmed that his debut album is set to release on early 2025. On December 20, Hawthorn released "Wildflower", an original song written for the Apple TV+ film F.L.Y. On January 31, he released a new single titled, "Only Love". On June 10, Hawthorn announced the release date, and details of his upcoming debut album titled, Church of the Outlaws which is set to be released on June 27, 2025. The album track list was revealed two days later.

== Personal life ==
" A few of them must not have seen eye-to-eye because the friendships fizzled after I came out to them. It was tough to deal with at the time, but I learned who my true friends were and who loves me for me."

— Hawthorn on losing friends after coming out, PJ and Thomas of The Property Lovers

Hawthorn is gay. He came out to his family and friends at the age of 27. According to the singer, his family was and "still is super accepting" and "loving" of his sexual orientation, he did lose friends after coming out, which he described as something "tough to deal with at the time".

Hawthorn publicly came out in 2018, a year after his music debut, to his Instagram followers after seeing the film Boy Erased. In 2019, the music video for "Dancing in the Living Room" which features Hawthorn dancing with a male partner, earned huge coverage and positive feedback from country and LGBTQ+ music outlets alike, with many praising Hawthorn and the single for their progressive input in country music, since the genre is known for holding conservative views.

== Discography ==
=== Studio albums ===
List of studio albums with selected details
Title	Details	Ref.
Church of the Outlaws	Release: June 27, 2025; Label: Self-released; Formats: digital download, streaming	

=== Extended plays ===
List of extended plays with selected details
Title	Details	Ref.
Cameron Hawthorn	Release: November 17, 2017; Label: Self-released; Formats: DL, streaming	
Mustang	Release: October 9, 2020; Label: Self-released; Formats: DL, streaming	

=== Singles ===
List of singles, showing year released, and originating album
Title	Year	Album	Ref.
"Road Trip"	2017	Cameron Hawthorn	
"Take Me to the Water"	2017	Cameron Hawthorn	
"Mama's Love"	2017	Cameron Hawthorn	
"Dancing in the Living Room"	2019	Mustang	
"Oh Hot Damn!" (solo or Goldhouse Remix)	2020	Mustang	
"To Break Hers"	2020	Mustang	
"Cowboy Take Me Away"	2020	Non-album single	
"Love at First Sight"	2021	Non-album single	
"Dreamland"	2021	Non-album single	
"Nothing Like a Cowboy"	2022	Non-album single	
"Country Boy Two-Step" (with Bright Light Bright Light)	2022	Non-album single	
"Lone Star"	2023	Non-album single	
"Desperado"	2023	Non-album single	
"Spell on You"	2023	Non-album single	
"Outlaw"	2024	Church of the Outlaws	
"Natural"	2024	Church of the Outlaws	
"Midnight Rider"	2024	Church of the Outlaws	
"Wildflower" (from the film F.L.Y.)	2024	Church of the Outlaws	
"Only Love"	2025	Church of the Outlaws	
"Kindred Spirit"	2025	Church of the Outlaws	
"Storm" (with Cartfish)	2025	Non-album single	
"I Hope You Dance"	2026	Non-album single	

=== Music videos ===
List of music videos, showing year released, and director
Title	Year	Director	Ref.
"Mama's Love"	2017	—N/a	
"Dancing in the Living Room"	2019	Cameron Hawthorn & Kelsy Karter	
"Oh Hot Damn!"	2020	Cameron Hawthorn	
"To Break Hers"	2020	Quinton Cook	
"Cowboy Take Me Away"	2020	—N/a	
"Love at First Sight"	2021	Noel Maitland & Cameron Hawthorn	
"Dreamland"	2021	—N/a	
"Lone Star"	2023	—N/a	
"Outlaw"	2024	—N/a	
"Natural"	2024	—N/a	
"Kindred Spirit"	2025	—N/a	

== See also ==
- LGBTQ representation in country music
