= Dancing in the Living Room =

Single by Cameron Hawthorn

from the EP Mustang
- Released: March 7, 2019
- Genre: Country
- Length: 3:44
- Label: Self-released
- Songwriters: Cameron Hawthorn; Cameron Ernst
- Producer: John Silos

Cameron Hawthorn singles chronology
"Mama's Love" (2017)	"Dancing in the Living Room" (2019)	"Oh Hot Damn!" (2020)

Music video
- "Dancing in the Living Room" on YouTube

"Dancing in the Living Room" is a song by American country singer-songwriter Cameron Hawthorn. It was self-released on March 7, 2019, as the lead single from his second extended play Mustang.

The song gained widespread attention following the release of its gay-themed music video, which received critical acclaim from both mainstream critics and country music outlets.

== Background and release ==
In an interview with Rage Monthly, Hawthorn said about the track:

"I literally wrote “Dancing in my Living Room” just after dancing with my boyfriend at the time. It was one of those things, I don’t know, I was just sitting around and I had this idea. It just felt so simple and the video kind of developed from there. I wasn’t out as an artist up until last year and when I came out on social media, this was really the first time I had ever written a song around it. This was a chance to put a real story into a song, especially with the music video. To me the song is just about love in the end, but the video was an opportunity for me to put myself out there."

— Cameron Hawthorn on the inspiration behind "Dancing in the Living Room"

== Music video ==
An official music video directed by Cameron Hawthorn and Kelsey Karter, was released on March 8, 2019. It features different romantic couples dancing to Hawthorn's music, and its ends with Hawthorn dancing along with his male lover in a living room. The video was widely praised for its progressive message and its role in normalizing such relationships within the traditionally conservative world of country music. Media outlets dubbed it Hawthorn's 'coming out moment,' despite the fact that he had already come out to his family and to his following prior to the video's release.

== Reception ==
"Dancing in the Living Room" was met with critical acclaim from both country music and Queer media outlets.

Bear World Mag praised the track, calling it a "wholehearted love song," and highlighted Hawthorn's songwriting, organic instrumentation, and his "passionate and heartfelt" vocal performance. Meanwhile, Medium called the track "a very sweet modern country love ballad," highlighting its "tenderness."

Janette Ayub of Girl Underground Music described the song as "an endearing ride that will touch any person who has ever been in love", calling it 'a gorgeous testament to love and the quiet, intimate moments shared," and praising Hawthorn’s narrative style as "a classic form of intimacy."

Accolades

Critics' rankings of "Dancing in the Living Room"
Publication	Year	Accolade	Rank	Ref.
Homosensual	2019	10 LGBT+ Music Videos You Won't Get Out Of Your Mind	Listed	

== Personnel ==
Credits adapted from Apple Music.

- Cameron Hawthorn — performer, songwriter
- Cameron Ernst — songwriter
- John Silos — producer

== Release history ==
Release dates and formats for "Dancing in the Living Room"
Region	Date	Format	Label	Ref.
Various	March 7, 2019	Digital download; streaming	Self-released	

== See also ==
- LGBTQ representation in country music
