= Mustang (EP) =

EP by Cameron Hawthorn
- Released: October 9, 2020
- Recorded: 2019–2020
- Genre: Country
- Length: 17:22
- Label: Self-released
- Producers: The Fund; John Silos; Greg Bates; Leroy Powell

Cameron Hawthorn chronology
Cameron Hawthorn (2017)	Mustang (2020)	Church of the Outlaws (2025)

Singles from Mustang
- 1. "Dancing in the Living Room" Released: March 7, 2019; 2. "Oh Hot Damn!" Released: July 19, 2019; 3. "To Break Hers" Released: September 4, 2020

Mustang is the second extended play by American singer and songwriter Cameron Hawthorn. It was released independently on October 9, 2020.

The five track extended play is mainly a country record with elements of country-pop, and spawned three singles: "Oh Hot Damn!", "To Break Hers" and the critical acclaimed "Dancing in the Living Room".

== Background and release ==
Mustang is the second extended play by Cameron Hawthorn, and his first in three years, following his self-titled EP in 2017. After the success of his breakthrough single "Dancing in the Living Room", which received critical acclaim for its LGBTQ+ representation, Hawthorn began work in the five-track project. In an interview with HuffPost, Hawthorn told Curtis M. Wong that the extended play was inspired by his personal journey and his desire to tell stories he had previously been unable to share. He commented, "All of these songs are stories I've wanted to tell, but have never felt free to tell. They say country music is 'three chords and the truth', these are the stories of my journey. This is me singing form the heart".

The opening and title track, "Mustang", was written by Hawthorn and The Funds, who also produced the song. Hawthorn said the track "encompasses the freedom" he experienced after embracing his authentic self. The second track, "Oh Hot Damn!", was written and produced by the same collaborators and centers on Hawthorn's attraction to "a line-dancing cowboy". "Dancing in the Living Room", the EP's third track, was written by Hawthorn and Cameron Ernst and produced by John Silos. Wong said of the track that he "couldn't asked for a better breakout" song. The fourth track, "To Break Hers", was co-written by Hawthorn and Lena Stone and produced by Greg Bates. Wong called the song "the EP's emotional apex", noting that it reflects on the end of a relationship between Hawthorn and a woman before he came out as gay. Hawathorn said of the track, that he wanted "to sing about something that was specific to my story but was also universal," adding, "It's hard to be fully vulnerable, but I'm finding more freedom in unashamedly being myself and peeling back the layers of myself as a songwriter". The extended play closes with "Boys", written by Hawthorn alongside Leroy Powell and Tim Jones, with production by Powell.

== Critical reception ==
Randy Slovacek of Instinct praised the EP, highlighting Hawthorn clearly "knowledge and appreciation for classic country music", as he "brings a fresh current flavor to his music" delivering a modern take to the genre. Slovacek stated that country fans will hear the influences of classic country stars, such as Johnny Cash and Roy Orbison, as well as contemporary stars of the likes of Shania Twain and Eric Church. Writing for Medium, Zack Side called the project "refreshing to hear", highlighting his clear modern twist of the "macho man feeling" present in past country music, and his confessional lyricsm. Culture Fix dubbed the EP as "a string of stunning country anthems", praising the "rich emotional depth" and "personal lyricism" of "Dancing in the Living Room" and "To Break Hers", as well the sexually-charged anthems of "Oh Hot Damn!" and "Boys" which served as homages to past country music icons, while choosing the title track as the highlight of the project for doing "an incredible job at capturing the sense of freedom, empowerment, and giddy excitement of love".

== Track listing ==
Mustang tracklist
No.	Title	Writer(s)	Producer(s)	Length
1.	"Mustang"	Cameron Hawthorn; Jeffrey Laliberte; Paul Laliberte; Shelby Archer	The Fund	3:07
2.	"Oh Hot Damn!"	Hawthorn; Laliberte; Laliberte; Archer	The Fund	3:12
3.	"Dancing in the Living Room"	Hawthorn; Cameron Ernst	John Silos	3:44
4.	"To Break Hers"	Hawthorn; Lena Stone	Greg Bates	3:48
5.	"Boys"	Hawthorn; Tim Jones; Leroy Powell	Leroy Powell	3:30
Total length:				17:22

== Personnel ==
Credits adapted from Apple Music.

- Cameron Hawthorn — performer, songwriter (all tracks)
- Jeffrey Laliberte — producer, songwriter (tracks 1–2)
- Paul Laliberte — producer, songwriter (tracks 1–2)
- Shelby Archer — songwriter (tracks 1–2)
- John Silos — producer (track 3)
- Cameron Ernst — songwriter (track 3)
- Greg Bates — producer (track 4)
- Lena Stone — songwriter (track 4)
- Tim Jones — songwriter (track 5)
- Leroy Powell — producer, songwriter (track 5)

== Release history ==
Release dates and formats for Mustang
Region	Date	Format	Label	Ref.
Various	October 9, 2020	Digital download; streaming	Self-released	

== See also ==
- LGBTQ representation in country music
