= Good Lookin' =

2023 song by Dixon Dallas

Single by Dixon Dallas

from the album Happy Anniversary
- Released: June 28, 2023
- Recorded: 2023
- Genre: Country; country pop
- Length: 2:47
- Songwriter: Dixon Dallas
- Producer: Jacob Lincoln

"Good Lookin'" is a song by Jake Hill, released under his country music alter-ego Dixon Dallas. The song is his second single released in 2023, after "Like Whiskey", which also deals with gay love and gay sexual relations between the singer and another man.

The song describes the positive emotions and attraction between the singer and his lover, and the physical expression of that attraction and love.

== Reception ==
The song became popular and met a warm reception. When Dallas released a clip of "Good Lookin'" on TikTok, the video became viral and amassed over twenty million views within two months of posting.

The song "took the Internet and streaming services by storm" and was described as catchy, raunchy, and unique and "such a bop."

It was also noted that the raunchy lyrics are part of the appeal of the song.

== Gay content ==
The song "Good Lookin'" includes blunt sexual content and explicit descriptions of sexual acts between two men. The gay content is positioned between the traditional framework of a country love song, which has been associated with traditional and conservative values for decades.

Dallas faced criticism for introducing explicit gay content into the country music space, and gaybaiting for commercial success. However, he claims he creates music with gay themes because it brings positivity to the world, saying:

The amount of messages I get from people saying 'I'm a gay man. We don't have this type of music. It makes me feel seen. It makes me feel heard and comfortable in my skin.' Those messages are what makes me want to keep doing this.

== See also ==
- LGBTQ representation in country music
