= Reba McEntire as a gay icon =

American country singer Reba McEntire is considered a gay icon. In 2023, Chris Azzopardi of Pride Source said McEntire has a "rabid gay following" and said she "has delighted in a friendship with the LGBT community since the beginning of her 40-year career". According to The Advocate, "Her ability to touch hearts from all walks of life is part of why McEntire has garnered a fiercely loyal gay fan following over the years." The magazine has also said McEntire's show Malibu Country, which has LGBTQ characters, "has given us many on-screen gays and won many LGBT fans". McEntire has supported LGBTQ rights and same-sex marriage. She has also done interviews with many LGBTQ publications.

== Drag ==
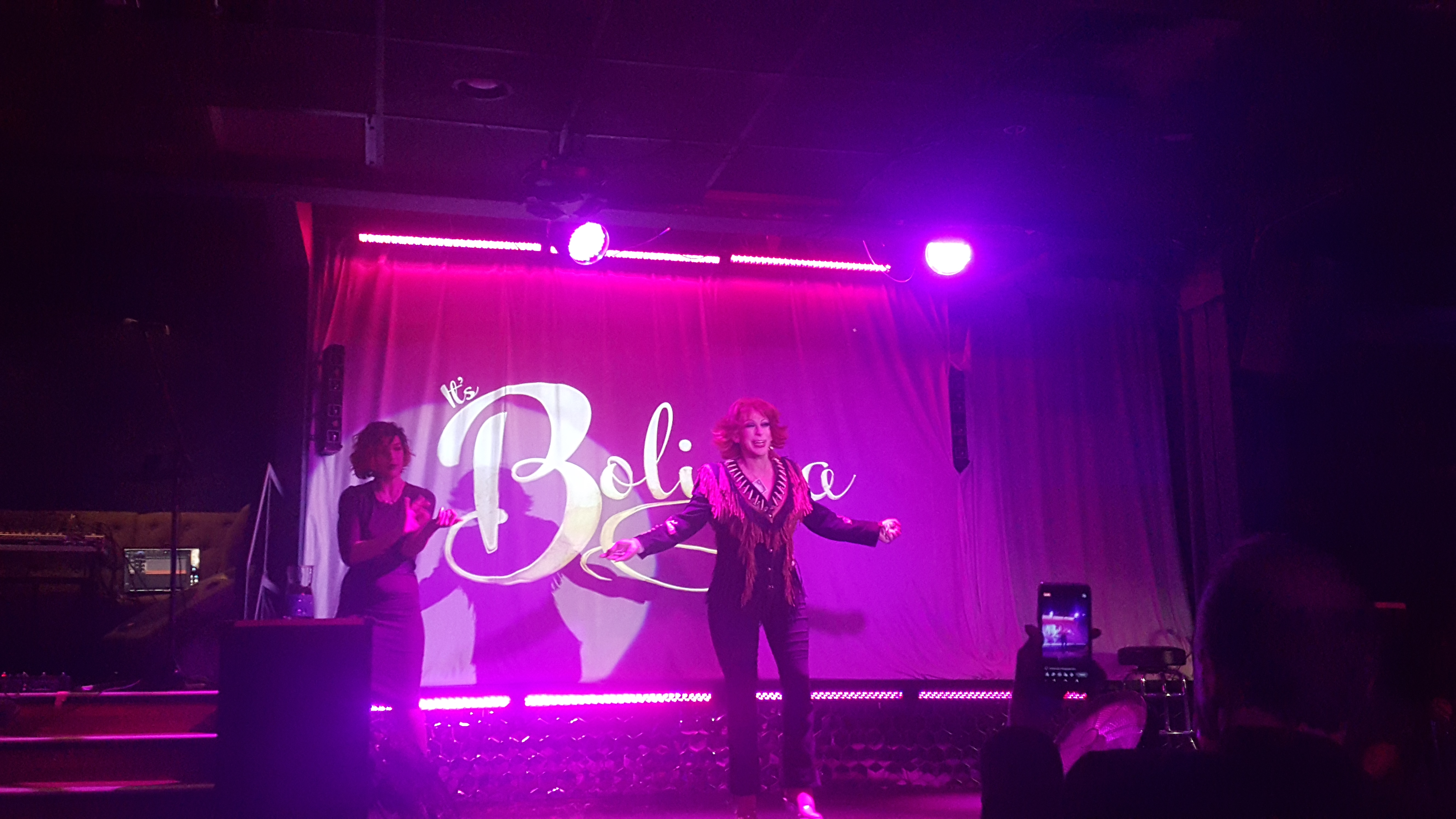
Drag performer Bolivia Carmichaels impersonating Reba McEntire at CC Slaughters in Portland, Oregon, in 2022

Many drag performers have impersonated McEntire, including for McEntire herself. Her cover of "Fancy" (1969) by Bobbie Gentry is often used during lip-syncs. The song was used during a lip-sync contest on the fifth season (2019) of the reality television series RuPaul's Drag Race All Stars. For one episode on the fourteenth season (2022) of the main series RuPaul's Drag Race, Bosco portrayed the fictional character Fancy Michaels and wore hair and makeup inspired by McEntire. Xtra Magazine said the character was "delightfully and absurdly" based on "Fancy".

In 2018, McEntire herself appeared in drag as Colonel Sanders in a series of KFC ads.

McEntire has spoken out against Tennessee's legislation banning drag performance in public spaces.

== Music and impact on LGBTQ musicians ==
McEntire's song "She Thinks His Name Was John" (1994) is about a woman dying from HIV/AIDS and confronted the crisis. Writing for Country Queer, Matthew J. Jones said, "The first country song about HIV/AIDS by a major artist, the song marks an important turning point in country music's relationship with the epidemic, which had already begun to impact rural America when the song was recorded. The song is an important country music milestone, but its shimmering, sentimental surface masks a lot of victim blaming and politics that have not necessarily aged well."

A remix of McEntire's "I'm a Survivor" by transgender producer LeahAnn "Lafemmebear" Mitchell features queer and trans musician Mya Byrne on lap steel. The collaboration has been described as "unprecedented".

Gay country musician Orville Peck has covered "Fancy", which McEntire covered in the 1990s. American Songwriter said Peck "[gender-bends] the track to include the idea of a young boy growing up and learning femininity and taking advantage of that in order to earn upward mobility". Esquire said, "Peck has taken this song, so definitive and controversial on its own, and reframed it as a modern tale of desperation, fetishization, and darkness—but through the lens of queerness. It's an angle that Gentry likely didn't consider with her original release, but one that adapts seamlessly to the narrative." The Advocate called the cover "very queer".

== See also ==
- Dolly Parton as a gay icon
- LGBTQ representation in country music
- List of gay icons
