= Mural of Dolly Parton and RuPaul =

Mural in Asheville, North Carolina, U.S.

- Artist: Gus Cutty
- Subject: Dolly Parton; RuPaul
- Location: Asheville, North Carolina, U.S.; 35°34′43.6″N 82°35′40.5″W

The Mural of Dolly Parton and RuPaul is a mural in West Asheville, North Carolina, painted by artist Gus Cutty on the outside wall of a beauty salon. The mural includes the portraits of country singer-songwriter Dolly Parton and drag performer RuPaul. Cutty painted the Parton component in 2018 and added the RuPaul component in 2021. The mural was well received. It featured in an episode of RuPaul's Drag Race and served as a local memorial to Parton upon her death.

== Background ==
Gus Cutty is an artist and muralist based in Asheville, North Carolina. He spent some of his teenage years in Nashville, Tennessee, progressing from drawing to graffiti and street art. He has run a mural business for many years. In his commissioned work, including a Chicago project, he has said that he aims to combine realist, architectural, and local cultural elements with geometric forms and color-blocking. Cutty and his partner, Kathryn Crawford, have also advised fellow Asheville muralist Leslie Reynalte-Llanco through Buncombe County's Creative Equity Mural Project.

== Content ==
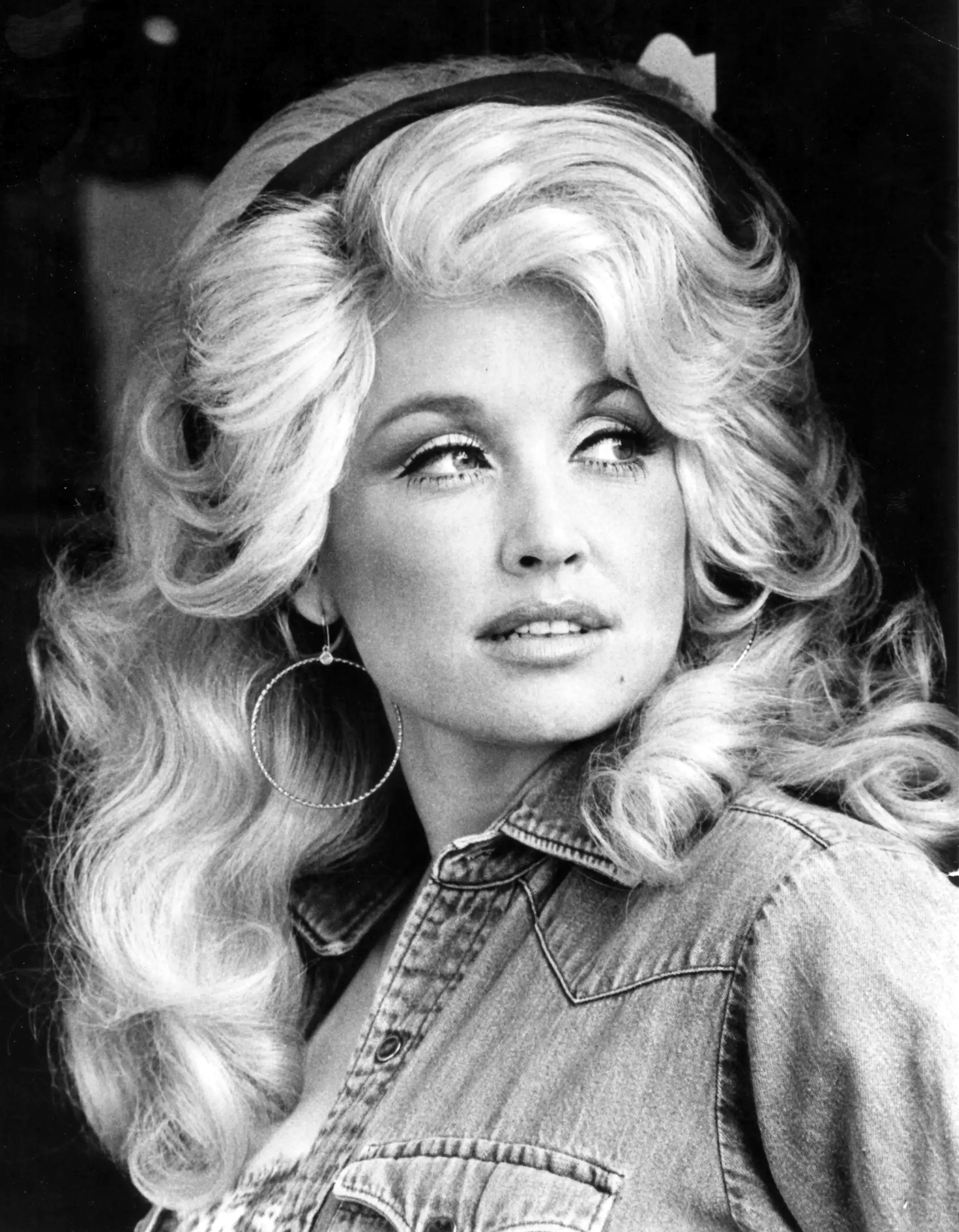
Dolly Parton

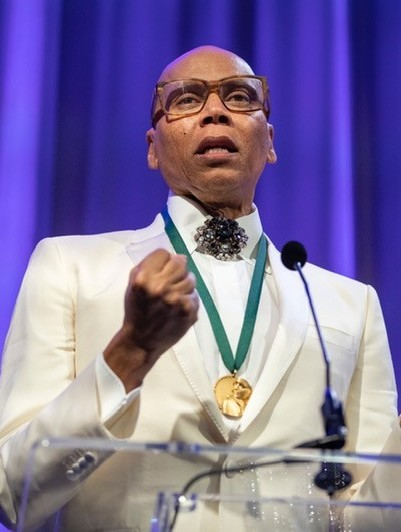
RuPaul

In 2018, Cutty painted a mural of Dolly Parton on Haywood Road outside Beauty Parade Hair Salon in West Asheville. The portrait replaced another of a girl licking ice cream, and took four days to complete. Cutty modeled the painting after a vintage portrait of the country singer.

In 2021, he added a portrait of RuPaul. Prior to the unveiling, salon owner Terra Marshall asked people to guess the identity of the second portrait.

== Reception ==
John Le of WLOS called the original mural of Dolly "a colorful new artistic landmark ... sure to draw a lot of traffic on social media". Following the addition of RuPaul's image, Donald Padgett of Out said the pairing was "just the type of unity this country needs most right now" and wrote, "The response has been decidedly positive, with even RuPaul giving a big seal of approval to the mural." RuPaul tweeted, "Gorgeous! I hope it's real." Brook Bolen included the painting in Asheville Today's 2021 "guide to Asheville, NC's most marvelous murals". Brett White of Decider.com described the mural as "absolutely gorgeous". On season 14 of RuPaul's Drag Race, seven contestants attempted to recreate the painting as part of a mini-challenge on episode "The Ross Mathews Roast".

After Parton's death, the mural became a spontaneous memorial, with fans leaving notes and mementos. Flowers left at the mural were repurposed into bouquets for local seniors and veterans. ArtsAVL, the Asheville-area arts council, recommended the mural to residents and tourists. Visitors remembered Parton for her kindness, acceptance, music, and community impact.

The mural is one of six murals in Asheville listed on the official Appalachian Mural Trail; a list of historical murals in Virginia and North Carolina.

== See also ==
- Dolly Parton as a gay icon – LGBTQ+ reception of Dolly Parton and her work
