= Dolly Parton as a gay icon =

Parton performing at the dedication of Cordell Hull Dam in 1973, reflecting her flamboyant and theatrical stage persona

American singer-songwriter Dolly Parton has been considered a gay icon following her decades of advocacy and support of the LGBTQ community and her career-spanning use of camp fashion and styling.

== Background ==
While Dolly Parton made frequent reference throughout her life to her disinterest in being vocally political, she also consistently gave her support to causes related to LGBTQ rights throughout her life and career. Parton frequently stated her appreciation of her gay fanbase in interviews, starting as early as 1984, despite the widespread public targetting and rejection of gay men during the height of the HIV/AIDS crisis in the United States.

In addition to this direct support for LGBTQ fans and communities, Parton's use of high camp aesthetics in her fashion and public persona made her a popular figure in drag circles for decades. This facet of her icon status among LGBTQ communities is reminiscent of the adoption of figures like Judy Garland and Lady Gaga as gay icons. These figures do not necessarily identify as LGBTQ themselves, but may be seen as queering social and gender norms through their iconoclastic behaviour and public presentation.

== Advocacy and allyship ==
=== HIV/AIDS ===
AIDS Quilt, U.S. Capitol

Common Threads poster

From as early as the 1980s, Parton publicly supported LGBTQ+ people despite the risk of backlash from her largely conservative country music audience amid the AIDS crisis and growing anti-LGBTQ+ sentiment. Her production company Sandollar Productions co-produced the film Common Threads: Stories from the Quilt, a 1989 documentary about the NAMES Project AIDS Memorial Quilt. The film won the Academy Award for Best Documentary Feature Film, the GLAAD Media Award for Outstanding Documentary, the Interfilm Award at the 40th Berlin International Film Festival, and a Peabody Award. She was known for her advocacy around HIV/AIDS into the 1990s.

In 1994, Parton contributed her song "You Gotta Be My Baby" to the charity album Red Hot + Country. Earlier the same year, she was one of 35 country music stars who joined an awareness-raising campaign "Break the Silence", with slogans such as "AIDS Ain't Just Some Big City Problem". UNAIDS, the Tennessee Center for AIDS Research, and (RED) shared tributes to her advocacy on their social media at the news of her death, and Tedros Adhanom Ghebreyesus, director-general of the World Health Organization, described her as an "ambassador of science and public health".

=== Ethics of inclusion and acceptance ===
From around 2003 to 2009, some of Parton's gay fans loosely organized Gay Days at Dollywood in East Tennessee, modeled after Gay Days at Walt Disney World. They faced several problems: legal threats over trademark infringement, a Ku Klux Klan protest, and declining participation. Parton never publicly commented on the gay events at her park but had publicly supported LGBT people, disclosing that she had gay and lesbian friends and family. She had also affirmed,

I've always been a freak and different, oddball even in my childhood and my own family, so I can relate to people who are struggling and trying to find their true identity. I do not sit in the seat of judgment. I love people for who they are. We're all God's children.

In 2008, Gay Days participation was less than half the event's record of about 3,000, and in 2009, the Gay Days organizer called it quits as he moved to Middle Tennessee, saying there had been too much to handle between police, lawyers, and Klan death threats. The organizer also told Out Traveler, "Dollywood isn't like Disney World. If you wear a T-shirt with a gay slogan on it, they make you turn it inside out." In 2011, Parton made a public apology when she heard that a lesbian attendee had been required to turn inside out a marriage equality T-shirt she was wearing.

In a 2014 interview with Billboard, when asked about Dollywood's popularity with the LGBT community, she referred to Matthew 7:1–3, saying, "But as far as the Christians, if people want to pass judgment, they're already sinning. The sin of judging is just as bad as any other sin they might say somebody else is committing. I try to love everybody." To the follow-up question asking to what she attributed her "large gay following", she replied:

They know that I completely love and accept them, as I do all people. I've had to go against all kinds of people through the years just to be myself. I think everybody should be allowed to be who they are, and to love who they love.

In 2014, a writer for Rolling Stone said Parton "ramped up her advocacy for gay rights in recent months". She supported marriage equality, telling CNN host Joy Behar, "Sure, why can't they get married? They should suffer like the rest of us do". In 2023, she voiced her support for the trans community after a series of anti-trans measures came into Tennessee law, saying that she had witnessed the pain LGBTQ+ people experienced when they were targeted and rejected.

== Music and media ==
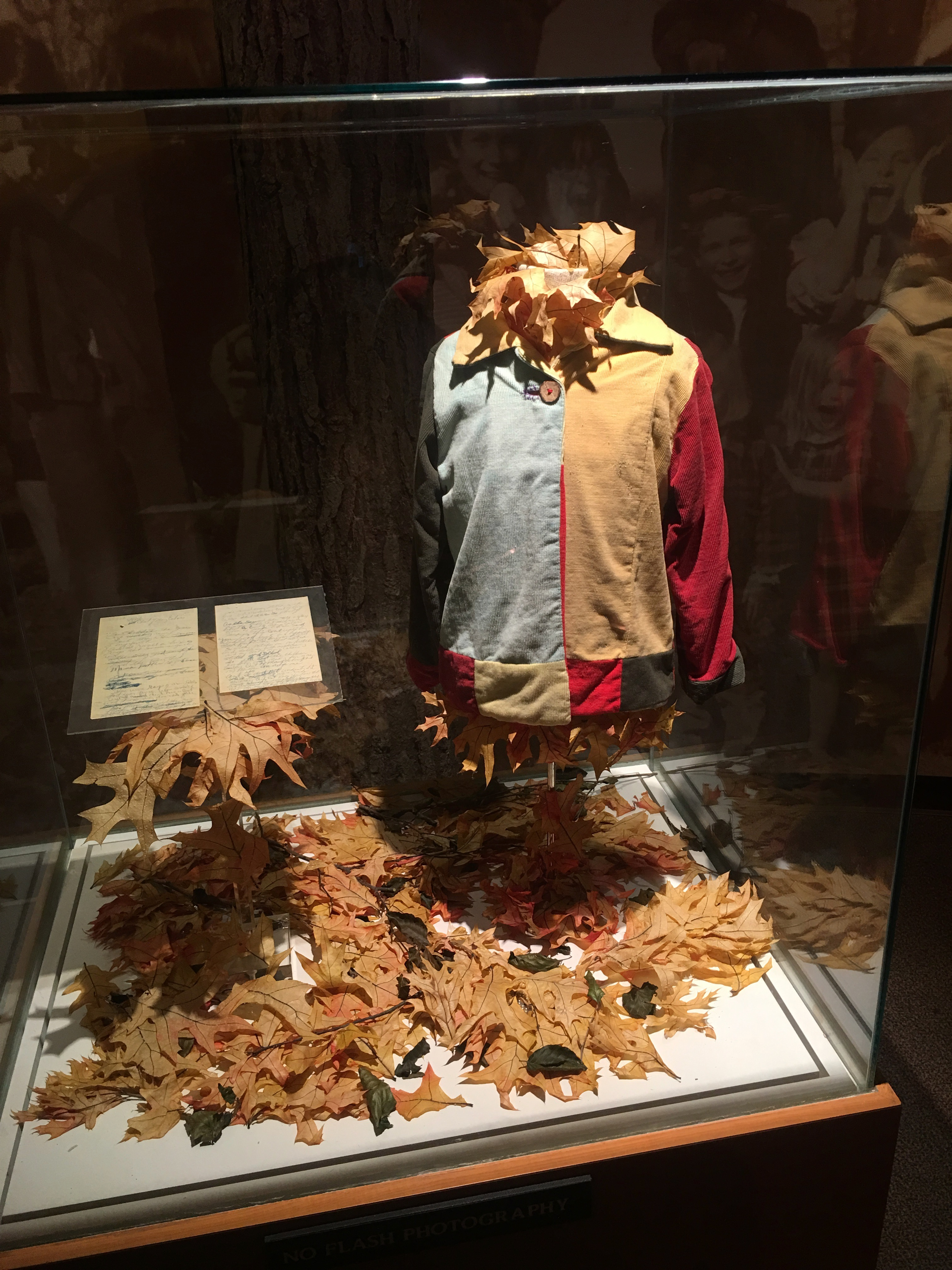
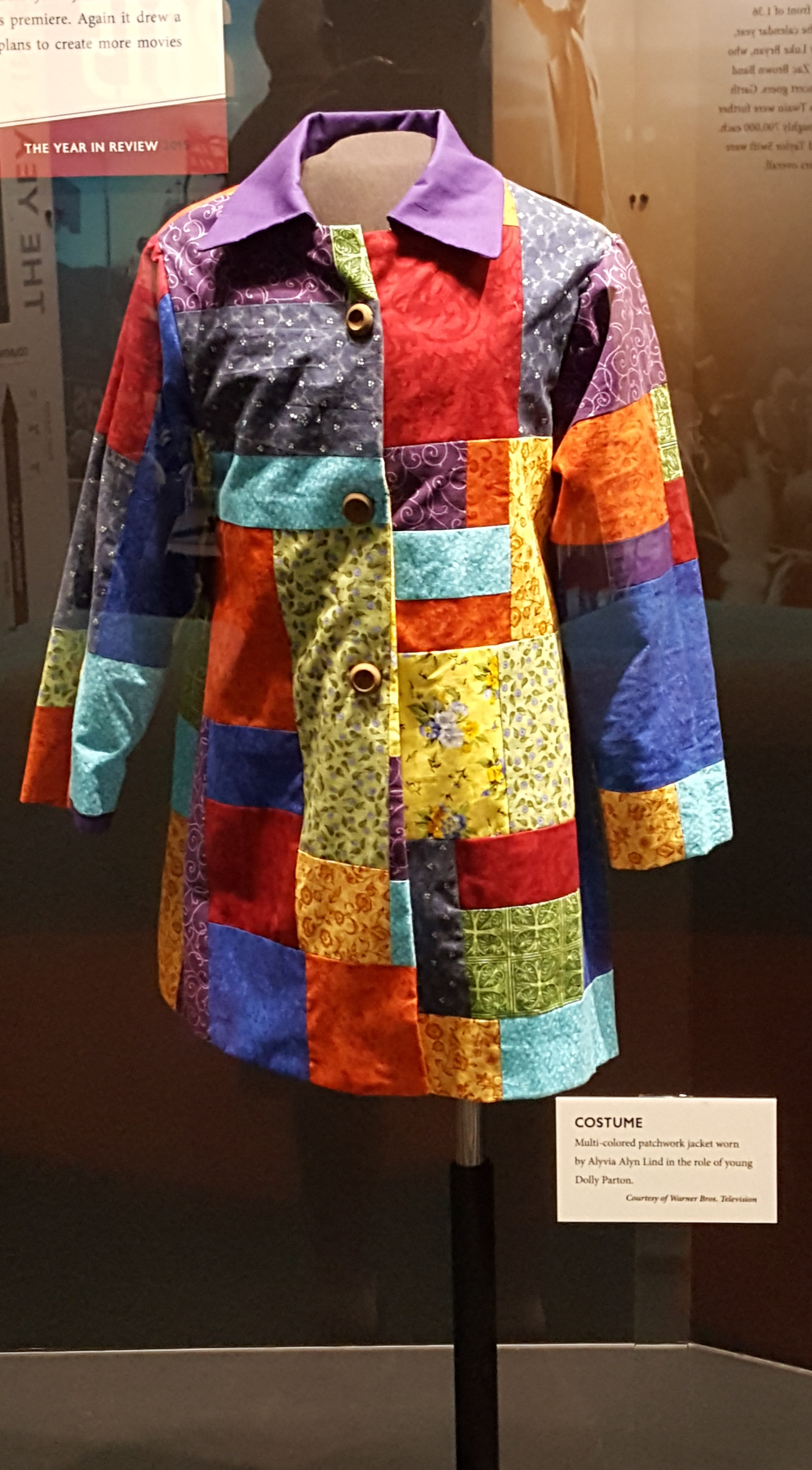
"Coat of Many Colors": replica by Parton's mother, Avie Lee, with song manuscript (left), and from the film Dolly Parton's Coat of Many Colors (right)

Parton scholar James Barker said that her work made a "space where a lot of LGBTQIA+ listeners can hear themselves" and that her songs had a message of acceptance. She hoped to be remembered especially as a songwriter, saying that she hoped her music would "always live".

"Coat of Many Colors" (1971) speaks to LGBTQ+ fans through its story of bullying, shame, and pride. In the song, Parton is proud of the coat her mother made, but other children mock her for being poor and different. Parton called the song her "philosophy": "It's OK to be different. You know, it's OK to not be like everybody else. In fact, it's not only OK, it's wonderful that you are who you are." This transformation of shame into pride may help explain why the song has a strong connection with LGBTQ+ fans, many of whom have seen or experienced LGBTQ bullying, disownment, and homelessness. Asked about the song in a 2014 interview, Parton connected her appeal to gay audiences with her own experiences of being different.

Parton used "Jolene" (1973), her ambiguous, open-ended cheating song, to connect with LGBTQ+ fans, often by singing "drag queen" instead of "Jolene" in concert. Though Parton did not intend it, the song's focus on another woman's beauty has invited homoerotic readings, including by musicologist Nadine Hubbs. Its queer subtext has been explored through covers, answer songs, and onscreen uses, including in the film Dumplin' (2018). Musicologist Lydia R. Hamessley compared the song to Sappho 31, the Archaic Greek lyric poem about lesbian desire. Asked about such readings, Parton replied, "I guess if you were a lesbian you might think that".

Her 1991 album Eagle When She Flies, included the song "Family", with the lyric "Some are preachers, some are gay ... But not a one is turned away when it's family". She later wrote "Travelin' Thru" for Transamerica, a film about a trans woman, earning her second Best Original Song nomination at the 78th Academy Awards. Parton collaborated with many LGBTQ artists such as Miley Cyrus, Brandi Carlile, and Elton John, and in 2025, Chappell Roan credited Parton for her genre-defying inclusivity.

Parton also included what The Advocate described as "a distinctly queer family story" in her Netflix anthology series Dolly Parton's Heartstrings, with the second episode, named for her song "Two Doors Down" featuring Andy Mientus and Michael J. Willett as a gay couple, saying "It's important that I touched on everything that all families go through ... Everyone has gays in their family". The episode won the last GLAAD Media Award for Outstanding Individual Episode (2020).

== Camp and drag ==
Parton's femininity was described as highly staged in its presentation, arguably exposing gender itself as a kind of performance. Out said Parton's "campy aesthetic and consistent positivity resonated with LGBTQ+ fans all around the world". Parton described herself as a drag queen and also said, "It's a good thing I was born a woman or I'd a been a drag queen". She is frequently impersonated by drag performers. She enjoyed being imitated and said:

I have always had a big gay following and I've always had drag queens dressing up like me all through the years. Sometimes when I'm in concert, especially when I'm in London, I have all these Dollies out in the crowd. I just get a kick out of seeing myself out there in the crowd.

Parton has been impersonated by many notable drag and transgender performers, including Brigitte Bandit and Yona Speidel. She has been impersonated on the drag reality television series RuPaul's Drag Race, including by contestants Kylie Sonique Love for the Snatch Game challenge and by Loosey LaDuca for an acting challenge. Parton was also a role model for contestant Trixie Mattel, who performed RuPaul's song "Adrenaline" while dressed as Parton on the third season (2018) of RuPaul's Drag Race All Stars (episode "Divas Lip Sync Live").

In 2018, Ginger Minj released a version of "Jolene" featuring fellow Drag Race contestants Alaska Thunderfuck, BeBe Zahara Benet, BenDeLaCreme, Katya, and Manila Luzon. In 2020, American actor and comedian Leslie Jordan impersonated Parton on the show. Parton and Drag Race contestant Nina West partnered on a limited-edition collection in 2020. The seventh season (2022) of RuPaul's Drag Race All Stars had a Parton-themed fashion show; participants included Jaida Essence Hall, Jinkx Monsoon, Monét X Change, Raja, Shea Couleé, Trinity the Tuck, The Vivienne, and Yvie Oddly. According to The Washington Post, Parton enjoyed seeing contestants on Drag Race impersonate her.

In 2021, Parton sang a "drag queen" version of "Jolene" (1973) on Late Night with Seth Meyers. She also competed alongside drag queens in a Dolly Parton look-alike contest, and lost. In 2026, Parton's "flamboyant" example was cited by a federal district judge striking down a Texas law restricting "sexually oriented" performances, including drag shows.

== Legacy in the LGBTQ+ community ==
Following Parton's death in 2026, one writer for the LGBTQ magazine Instinct said, "For LGBTQ+ fans, Dolly was always more than a country music superstar. She was a safe space wrapped in sequins. A woman whose music, humor, kindness, and unapologetic larger-than-life personality made generations of queer people feel seen, welcomed, and celebrated." LGBTQ establishments paid tribute to her by hosting drag shows and playing her music. The Castro Theatre in San Francisco displayed a marquee message, and a nearby gay bar lowered the rainbow flag to half mast.

Columnist Kevin Rector wrote a piece for the Los Angeles Times headlined "Dolly Parton was special to the LGBTQ+ community. She showed us our country loves us". Columnist John Casey reflected in The Advocate that the one column he regretted writing was when he criticized Parton for including "screaming transphobe and homophobe" Kid Rock on her duets album Rockstar. He explained, "What I read [in the comments] wasn't people lashing out at Kid Rock. It was people defending Dolly, fiercely, fervently, and protectively, from someone—me—they rightly assumed hadn't earned the right to question her."

== See also ==
- Cultural impact of Dolly Parton
- LGBTQ representation in country music
- List of gay icons
- Mural of Dolly Parton and RuPaul
- Music and emotion
- Reba McEntire as a gay icon
