= Anastasia Soare =

Romanian-American business executive (born 1957)

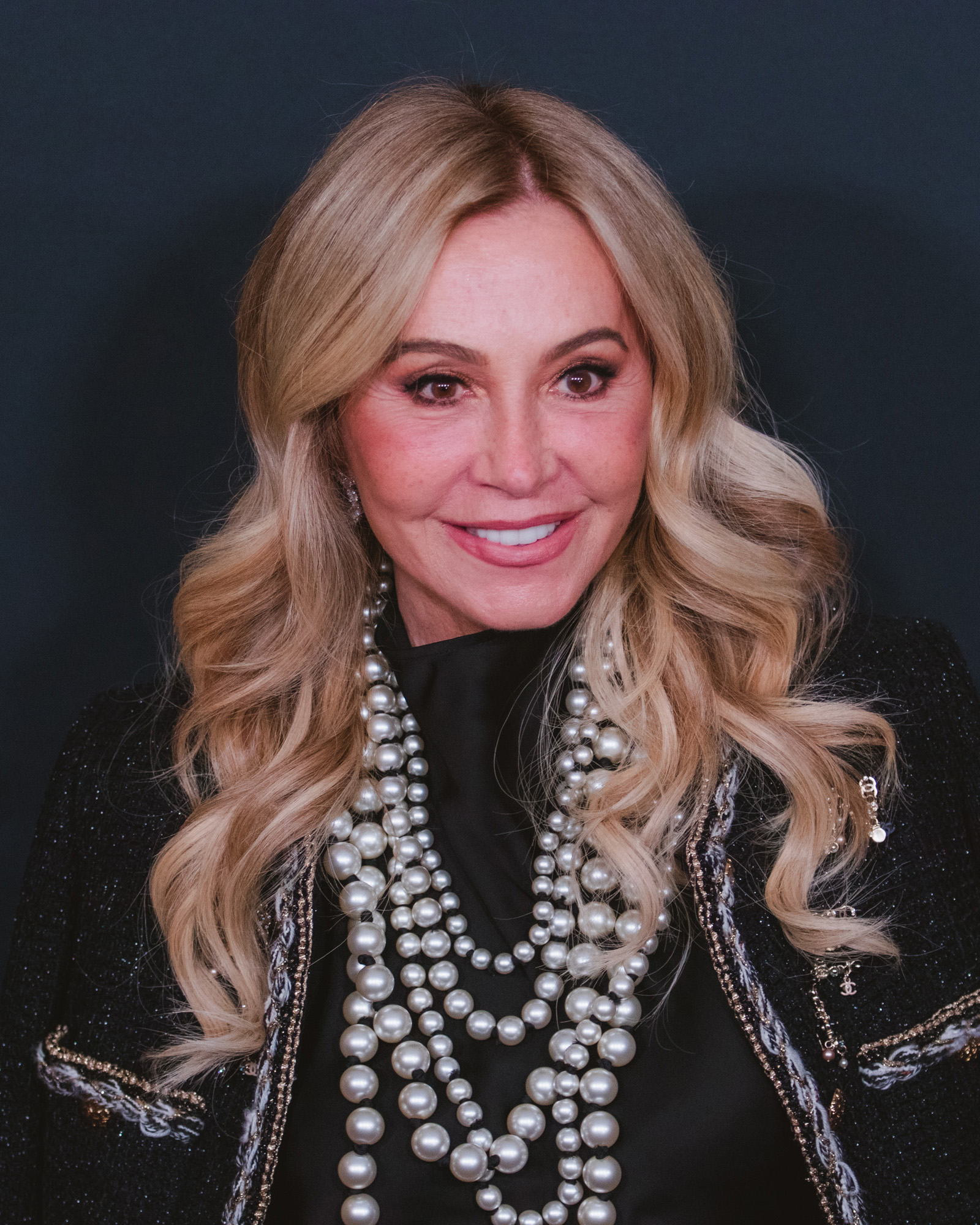
- Soare in 2026
- Born: Anastasia Bălămaci; 28 December 1957 (age 68); Constanța, Romania
- Occupation: Businesswoman
- Known for: CEO and founder, Anastasia Beverly Hills
- Spouse: Victor Soare (m. 1978; div. 1994)
- Children: Claudia Soare aka Norvina

Anastasia Soare (née Bălămaci; born 28 December 1957) is a Romanian-American businesswoman, and the CEO and founder of Anastasia Beverly Hills, known as the "Eyebrow Queen".

== Early life ==
Soare was born in Constanța, Romania. the daughter of tailors Dumitru Bălămaci (who died when she was 12) and Victoria Babu. She studied art history and architecture in Romania.

== Career ==
Soare spoke very little English in 1989 when she moved to Los Angeles, where she worked as an aesthetician at a beauty salon and soon realized that eyebrows were an under-explored area. "I developed a technique for how to shape eyebrows according to people's bone structure and natural eyebrow shape". As her manager did not think there was enough of a market, she rented a room in a Beverly Hills salon, providing facials, body waxing, and eyebrow sculpting. By 1997, she was running her own salon on Beverly Hills' Bedford Drive. As a beautician, she has stated that her first two clients for an eyebrow treatment were Cindy Crawford and Naomi Campbell. Other clients have included Faye Dunaway and Jennifer Lopez.

She is the CEO and founder of Anastasia Beverly Hills beauty brand, available in almost 2,000 stores worldwide. In 2018, the company received an investment from private equity firm TPG. In 2023, Forbes estimated the value of all of Anastasia Beverly Hills at approximately $500 million.

== Personal life ==
In 1978, she married Victor Soare, a ship's captain. The couple has a daughter, Claudia (known professionally as Norvina), who is also active in the makeup business. In 1986, while his ship was docked in Italy, Victor Soare visited the American embassy and asked for asylum. He reached the United States six months later. However, Soare and her daughter were not allowed to leave Romania to join him in the United States until 1989. Victor and Anastasia divorced in 1994. She lives in Beverly Hills, California.
