= Jake Hill (musician) =

American singer and rapper

- Hill in 2025

Background information
- Also known as: iamjakehill; ur pretty; Dixon Dallas; Lil Tra$h
- Born: Daniel Jacob Hill; April 10, 1992 (age 34)
- Origin: Enterprise, Alabama, U.S.
- Genres: Alternative rock; metalcore; pop-punk; country; rap metal; rap rock
- Occupations: Rapper; singer; songwriter
- Years active: 2016–present

Daniel Jacob Hill (born April 10, 1992) is an American rapper and singer-songwriter who performs under several stage names, including iamjakehill, Dixon Dallas, Lil Tra$h, and ur pretty.

As iamjakehill, his music blends rap, alternative rock, and metal, while his other projects explore genres such as pop-punk. In 2023, Hill gained attention for his country music alter-ego, Dixon Dallas. The project's songs, such as "Good Lookin'" and "F-150", went viral on TikTok.

== Early life ==
Daniel Jacob Hill was born on April 10, 1992 in Enterprise, Alabama, US. Hill grew up in a small town in Alabama. He began writing rhymes around age 12 and became "super into music" at 13. His interest was sparked after he started skateboarding and was introduced to the band Silverstein. He initially disliked their album When Broken Is Easily Fixed but forced himself to listen to it to "be cool" and eventually "fell in love with it."

Hill originally aspired to be a guitarist and play metal, but felt this was not possible in his hometown, where he believed "nobody really understands the music industry." He has stated that his music is inspired by his experiences with anxiety and depression, as well as by video games he grew up playing, such as Bloodborne, The Last of Us, and Dark Souls.

== Career ==
=== Beginnings as iamjakehill ===
Hill began his music career by "rapping as a joke," as he used to make fun of rap music. After his "joke songs" began "taking off" and he received minor YouTuber opportunities, he decided to pursue it seriously. As iamjakehill, his music blends rap, alternative rock, and metal. His other personas like Lil Tra$h cover genres including alternative rock, rap, and metalcore. Hill has also collaborated with artist Josh A.

On October 28, 2019, Hill canceled a scheduled performance at the White Oak Music Hall in Houston. The cancellation was a protest against a venue-wide ban on the sale and consumption of meat, which had been implemented because the artist Morrissey was performing at the same venue that night. In a video explaining his decision, Hill stated he was told he would have to eat his food "outside like a fucking dog" and said, "I'm not about to bow down to this guy." He ended the video by saying, "Fuck you Morrissey Bitch!" He later tweeted that the cancellation was "about being treated like an equal human" and that he refused to perform where his crew was not "treated as such." He also posted a message of inclusivity, stating, "I don't care if you're black, white, gay, trans, religious, not religious, vegetarian, vegan, etc. I love you all the same." He promised fans he would return to Houston for a free show in 2020.

As of June 2023, Hill had released ten albums, in addition to several EPs and singles. He has referred to his song "By The Sword" as his "biggest song." Hill attributes his success to "turning negative things into a positive outlet" by writing songs about topics like anxiety, depression, and breakups.

=== Alter-Egos: ur pretty and Dixon Dallas ===
In addition to his main persona, Hill performs as ur pretty, a pop-punk side project. This persona, also described as pop-funk, features "queer-inclusive" songs, including "Keep Riding Me." As Hill, he has explored queer themes in several musical genres.

In 2023, Hill gained notoriety for his country music alter-ego, Dixon Dallas. The persona went viral on TikTok for the song "Good Lookin'", which features raunchy, explicit lyrics about gay sex, such as "He's bouncing off my booty cheeks, I love the way he rides / I can hardly breathe when he's pumping deep inside." Other songs with similar themes followed, including "F-150" and "Something to Feel."

The explicit nature of the songs and Hill's refusal to state his own sexuality led to accusations of gaybaiting and queerbaiting. Hill has responded by stating his sexuality is "immaterial" to his music and that "it doesn't matter." He described the music as "a big f*** you to my past." He has also cited positive feedback as his motivation, stating, "The amount of messages I get from people saying 'I'm a gay man. We don't have this type of music. It makes me feel seen. It makes me feel heard and comfortable in my skin.' Those messages are what makes me want to keep doing this."

By 2023, Hill had amassed millions of listeners across platforms. He scheduled a fall 2023 tour co-headlining as both Jake Hill and Dixon Dallas, with stops in Atlanta, Orlando, and Tampa. During a March 2025 performance as Dixon Dallas, he performed covers of his other personas' songs, including "Keep Riding Me" (ur pretty) and "By The Sword" (iamjakehill).

== Personal life ==
His other stated passions include video games, particularly Rocket League, his cat, his family, and cars. He owns a GT 350 R.

Hill has publicly discussed his mental health, advocating for practices like taking Vitamin D supplements, exercising, and eating better, stating these "huge changes" have significantly improved his mental state. He has not publicly disclosed his sexuality.

== Discography ==
=== Tracks released as iamjakehill ===
Title (Listing Order)	Collab	Year	Single/EP/Album
"I Don't Love You"		2016	Semi Serious
"Thru with U"		2016	Semi Serious
"Ima Be Fine"		2016	Semi Serious
"Day Ones"		2016	Semi Serious
"Pewdiepie Song"		2016	Semi Serious
"Game Over"		2016	Semi Serious
"Quick Freestyle"	Lil Pinecone (himself)	2016	Semi Serious
"I Miss the Old Ethan"		2016	Semi Serious
"Buried"		2016	Semi Serious
"Blood"		2016	Semi Serious
"Reaper"		2017	Semi Serious 2
"Heck the Police"		2017	Semi Serious 2
"Burn"		2017	Semi Serious 2
"Office Work, Pt.2"		2017	Semi Serious 2
"Uncomfortable"		2017	Semi Serious 2
"Substance"		2017	Semi Serious 2
"I Lost Myself When I Found You"		2017	Semi Serious 2
"I.M.Y.S.M"		2017	Semi Serious 2
"They're Here"		2017	Spectrum
"Mindless"		2017	Spectrum
"Storm"		2017	Spectrum
"Die a King"		2017	Spectrum
"Better Off Dead"	Josh A	2017	Spectrum
"38 to the Face"		2017	Spectrum
"Murderer's Regret"		2017	Spectrum
"We Die Too"		2017	Spectrum
"Prada Coffin"		2017	Spectrum
"Anxiety"		2017	Spectrum
"Help"		2017	Spectrum
"Finer Things"		2017	Spectrum
"Cantaloupe's and Natural Calm"		2017	Spectrum
"Everyday Apocalypse"		2017	Spectrum
"Me vs You"		2017	Single
"Drag Me Deeper"		2017	Single
"All Hallow's Eve (Skit) [feat. Satan]"	Josh A	2017	Better off Dead
"Pennywise"	Josh A	2017	Better off Dead
"North Korea"	Josh A	2017	Better off Dead
"Gucci Coffin"	Josh A	2017	Better off Dead
"Better off Dead"	Josh A	2017	Better off Dead
"Suicidal Thoughts"	Josh A	2017	Better off Dead
"Infomercial (Skit)"	Josh A	2017	Better off Dead
"Nuketown (Bonus)"	Josh A	2017	Better off Dead
"It's Everyday Bro (Bonus)"	Josh A	2017	Better off Dead
"Banks (Bonus)"	Josh A	2017	Better off Dead
"Rust (Bonus)"	Josh A	2017	Better off Dead
"Apocalypse (Intro)"	Josh A	2018	Better off Dead II
"Bad Souls"	Josh A	2018	Better off Dead II
"John Wick"	Josh A	2018	Better off Dead II
"Flexorcist"	Josh A	2018	Better off Dead II
"Angels of the Damned"	Josh A	2018	Better off Dead II
"Understand"	Josh A	2018	Better off Dead II
"Better Days"	Josh A	2018	Better off Dead II
"Orchestral Intro"	Josh A	2018	Chaos
"Ghost Town"	Josh A	2018	Chaos
"Lost Souls"	Josh A	2018	Chaos
"A Special Campaign Message (Skit)"	Josh A	2018	Chaos
"Anarchy Acres"	Josh A	2018	Chaos
"Tilted Towers"	Josh A	2018	Chaos
"Loot Lake"	Josh A	2018	Chaos
"Alabama (Skit)"	Josh A	2018	Chaos
"To The Grave"	Josh A	2018	Chaos
"Suicide Forest"	Josh A	2018	Chaos
"Endless Nightmare"	Josh A	2018	Chaos
"Semipiternal"		2018	Solace
"Stress"		2018	Solace
"Selfish"		2018	Solace
"Solace"		2018	Solace
"Stay"		2018	Solace
"Sanctuary"		2018	Solace
"Solitude"		2018	Solace
"Shooter"		2018	Wither
"Revenant"		2018	Wither
"Siren"		2018	Wither
"Phobetor"		2018	Wither
"New Wave"		2018	Wither
"A Quiet Place"		2018	Wither
"Wither"		2018	Wither
"Antheia"		2018	Single
"London on My Mind"		2019	Solace II
"Who Am I?"		2019	Solace II
"Product of the Mud"		2019	Solace II
"Misery Ave"		2019	Solace II
"Set it Straight"		2019	Solace II
"Far Away from You"		2019	Solace II
"Worst Mistakes"	Josh A	2019	Save Our Souls
"Save Our Souls"	Josh A	2019	Save Our Souls
"Lost You In The Fire"	Josh A	2019	Save Our Souls
"Heartbreaks"	Josh A	2019	Save Our Souls
"Not Enough"	Josh A, Darko	2019	Save Our Souls
"Better Alone"	Josh A	2019	Save Our Souls
"Won't Die Young"	Josh A	2019	Save Our Souls
"Cycles"	Josh A	2019	Save Our Souls
"Brighter"	Josh A	2019	Save Our Souls
"Autumn Gloom"		2020	Autumn Gloom
"All Along"		2020	Autumn Gloom
"This War"		2020	Autumn Gloom
"Use Me, Haunt Me"	sim_bex	2020	Autumn Gloom
"I.M.Y.S.M."		2020	Autumn Gloom
"Virginia Interlude"		2020	Autumn Gloom
"We Can Live Forever"		2020	Autumn Gloom
"Million"		2020	Autumn Gloom
"Watch Me Wither"		2020	Autumn Gloom
"Ellie!"		2020	Autumn Gloom
"RUN UP!"	Josh A	2020	Single
"miss me"	Josh A	2020	Single
"dying lately"		2021	dying lately
"by your side"		2021	dying lately
"go if you want to"		2021	dying lately
"nerve"		2021	dying lately
"meow"		2021	dying lately
"poison"		2021	dying lately
"state of mind"		2021	dying lately
"walk away"		2021	dying lately
"what gives"		2021	dying lately
"dead summer"		2021	dying lately
"covered in curses"		2021	dying lately
"the story ends"		2021	dying lately
"hate me"		2021	dying lately
"Satin Black"		2022	Follow Me into Hell
"Into The Fray"		2022	Follow Me into Hell
"I Chose Violence"		2022	Follow Me into Hell
"Follow Me Into Hell"		2022	Follow Me into Hell
"Hiding in the Dark"		2022	Follow Me into Hell
"Back From the Dead"	Josh A	2022	Single
"little pretender"		2023	So Much For Closure
"waste my time"		2023	So Much For Closure
"meany"		2023	So Much For Closure
"running to you"		2023	So Much For Closure
"bitter pill"		2023	So Much For Closure
"eyelids"		2023	So Much For Closure
"december 23rd"		2023	So Much For Closure
"let you go"		2023	So Much For Closure
"F.T.B."		2023	Revenge Anthems
"How It Ends"		2023	Revenge Anthems
"Drama Queen"		2023	Revenge Anthems
"SMD"		2024	bad times friend...
"Nothing Left"		2024	bad times friend...
"By the Sword"		2024	bad times friend...
"Voidwalker"		2024	bad times friend...
"Wake Up"		2024	bad times friend...
"Searhing for Solace"		2025	Life in General
"Ill Be Leaving"		2025	Life in General
"The Silence"		2025	Life in General
"Hate You Instead"		2025	Life in General
"So Numb"		2025	Life in General
"Drown It Out"		2025	Life in General
"Never Ever"		2025	Life in General
"The Void"		2025	Life in General
"I'll Never Forget"		2025	Life in General
"Odd One Out"		2025	Life in General
"50 BMG"		2026	Single
"All I See Is Death"		2026	Single
"I Cant Fix You"		2026	Single
"Empty Face"		2026	Single
"Riptide"		2026	Single

=== Tracks released as Lil Tra$h ===
Title (Listing Order)	Collab	Year	Single/EP/Album
"It's Hot Down Here (Intro)"	Lil Revive	2017	It's Hot Down Here
"Everything"	Lil Revive	2017	It's Hot Down Here
"Boneless"	Lil Revive	2017	It's Hot Down Here
"$erendipity Boy$"	Lil Revive	2017	It's Hot Down Here
"Everything [Dank Edition]"	Lil Revive	2017	It's Hot Down Here
"Boneless [Dank Edition]"	Lil Revive	2017	It's Hot Down Here
"$erendipityBoy$ [Dank Edition]"	Lil Revive	2017	It's Hot Down Here
"Ain't Nothin' Better'n Bein' A Country Boy"		2021	Meme King
"Hotdog Heartbreak"		2021	Meme King
"IDK"		2021	Meme King
"Minecraft"		2021	Meme King
"do it look like im left off bad and boujee"		2021	Meme King
"Tyler1 Diss"		2021	Meme King
"Kitties and Inconveniences"		2021	Meme King
"We Die Too – Less Dark Version"		2021	Meme King
"Twenty Sixteen"		2021	Meme King
"Snowflake"		2021	Meme King
"Bandzzz"		2021	Meme King
"Garbage"		2024	Tra$h Music
"Ain't Another"	Lil Pinecone (himself)	2024	Tra$h Music
"Whippin Da Cat"		2024	Tra$h Music
"3 Phones"	Mob Tha Don	2024	Tra$h Music
"Bakspace"		2024	Tra$h Music
"Cuz I Say So"		2024	Tra$h Music
"How Im Movin"		2024	Tra$h Music

=== Tracks released as Dixon Dallas ===
Title	Year	Single/EP/Album
"Like Whiskey"	2023	Single Happy Anniversary
"Good Lookin'"	2023	Single Happy Anniversary
"Sleeping All Alone"	2023	Single Happy Anniversary
"F-150"	2023	2 More Happy Anniversary
"Better Without You"	2023	2 More Happy Anniversary
"Something To Feel"	2023	Single Happy Anniversary
"Leave This All Behind"	2024	Single Happy Anniversary
"This is Love"	2024	Happy Anniversary
"Running To You"	2024	Happy Anniversary
"Good Lookin' – Acoustic"	2024	Happy Anniversary
"Like Honey"	2024	Single
"Beggin' For More"	2025	Single
"Kinda Crazy"	2026	Single
"Fool For You"	2026	Single

=== Tracks released as ur pretty ===
Title	Year	Single/EP/Album
"Keep Riding Me"	2021	Single
"I'll Never Let You Go"	2021	Single
"Hit My Spot"	2022	Single
"Fill Me Up"	2023	Single
"Right Now"	2024	Single
"Taste It"	2025	Single

== See also ==
- LGBTQ representation in country music
