= Anastasia Beverly Hills =

American cosmetics company

- Type: Private
- Founded: 1997; 29 years ago
- Headquarters: United States
- Area served: Worldwide
- Key people: Claudia Soare (president)
- Products: Cosmetics
- Revenue: $240 million (Year ending March 2022)
- Owner: Anastasia Soare; TPG Inc. (minority stake)
- Website: anastasiabeverlyhills.com

Anastasia Beverly Hills, also known as ABH, is an American cosmetics company best known for its eyebrow products. The company was founded by Romanian-born Anastasia Soare in 1997, in Beverly Hills, California. Soare's daughter Claudia Soare, also known as Norvina, is the president of the company. In 2023, the company was reported to be worth approximately $500 million, with $240 million in annual revenue.

== History ==
Anastasia Beverly Hills was founded in 1997 by Anastasia Soare when she opened her flagship salon in Beverly Hills. The company's first product line was released in 2000. The brand has become known for its eyebrow products and for introducing a new brow-shaping service to customers, the "Golden Ratio Eyebrow Shaping Method." The Method aims to finding balance, symmetry, and beauty through the creation of arches that perfectly frame any face shape.

Since its launch, Anastasia Beverly Hills has grown to sell over 485 products in over 2,000 stores worldwide, including Dillard's, Macy's, Nordstrom, Sephora and Ulta Beauty. Their products are also sold in over 25 countries.

Soare sold a minority stake in the business to a private equity firm in 2018.

== Controversy ==
In July 2017, ABH released the Subculture eyeshadow palette. Online reviewers criticized the poor blendability and excessive fallout of the eyeshadows, leading the company to apologize on social media.

== Collaborations ==
ABH has collaborated with a few social media beauty influencers to create and promote new products.

In 2016, ABH collaborated with "Makeup by Mario" to create a master eyeshadow palette. The palette was announced through Kim Kardashian’s Snapchat account, and Mario Dedivanovic named two of the eyeshadows after her. Dedivanovic has been Kardashian's make-up artist for many years.

In 2017, ABH collaborated with Nicole Guerriero to create a glow kit containing six highlighters. Guerriero and ABH both promoted the product on Instagram.

In 2018, ABH collaborated with Amra Olevic, also known as AmRezy, to create an individual highlighter. The highlight/illuminator is sparkly, with a gold finish. It is suitable for all skin types.

In 2019, ABH collaborated with Jackie Aina to create an eyeshadow palette catering to darker skin tones, something ABH had neglected in the past. Later that year, the brand collaborated with YouTuber Carli Bybel to create an eyeshadow palette with 14 shades. Also in 2019, drag queen Alyssa Edwards released a 14 pan eyeshadow palette with ABH including a loud and campy range of shades.

In 2020, ABH collaborated with AmRezy again to design a 16 shade eyeshadow palette.

In 2022, ABH announced its collaboration with Los Angeles–based brand Dundas to launch its gender-neutral makeup collection. Called the Dundas Enhancers, this collection was set to launch in early 2023.

In 2025, ABH signed a multi-year partnership deal with the Red Bull Academy Programme, where the company will support the Red Bull Racing (RBR) and the Visa Cash App Racing Bulls (VCARB) F1 Academy teams. F1 Academy is a female-only, Formula 4–level single-seater racing championship founded by the Formula One Group. For Round 3 at Silverstone in 2026, ABH collaborated with VCARB to launch a one-off special livery to promote the Kiss Theory lip balm.
