= Norvina =

Romanian-born American business executive and Internet personality

- Born: Claudia Norvina Soare; November 16, 1986 (age 39); Romania
- Occupations: Internet personality; cosmetic business executive
- Known for: Creative director of Anastasia Beverly Hills

Claudia Norvina Soare, known professionally as Norvina, is a Romanian-born American Internet personality and cosmetics businesswoman. She has been the president and creative director of Anastasia Beverly Hills, founded by her mother Anastasia Soare, since 2016.

== Career ==
She began her online career posting on YouTube and Instagram with beauty related content, and has filled in on James Charles's YouTube channel. She built her online presence separate from the work and branding of her mother.

She began her work with her mother's company as the front desk person at her mother's salon, later working in marketing and corporate sales, and then the make-up side of the business starting in 2012. She has also worked as "every assistant" within the company. She also spends large portions of her day working with social media marketing and in the cosmetics labs. Soare used her skills and platform developed in social media to help grow the Anastasia Beverly Hills Instagram account.

In 2016 she was named in WWD's "10 Most Wanted List: The 10 Most In-Demand Execs in Digital Fashion and E-Commerce."

In 2016 she became the president and Creative Director of Anastasia Beverly Hills. She later launched a new side of the brand with the Norvina product line, notably the series of Norvina Pro Pigment Palettes starting in 2019. In 2021 she combined the launch of the Pro Pigment Palette no. 5 with gaming to create the 'Norvina Cyber City'.

In 2020 she was a judge on James Charles's reality competition web series Instant Influencer. Since 2021 she has appeared as a guest on multiple episodes on RuPaul's Drag Race along with several of its international spin-offs. Anastasia Beverly Hills provides a prize for many series of Drag Race.

== Personal life ==
Soare was born in Romania, one of two children of Victor Soare, a ship captain, and Anastasia Soare (née Bălămaci). In 1986 her father, while docked in Italy, went to the American embassy and asked for asylum, reaching the United States six months later. Soare and her mother were unable to immigrate until 1989. Her parents divorced in 1994.

Her mother wanted to name her Norvina as a variation of her paternal grandfather's name, however Romanian law at the time forbade any non-Romanian names. She went by Claudia and Norvina interchangeably growing up and has used Norvina professionally due to its distinctness.

As of 2020 she lives in Beverly Hills, California.

== Filmography ==
Television
Year	Title	Role	Notes
2020	Instant Influencer	Judge	
2021	RuPaul's Drag Race (season 13)	Guest	Episode: "Nice Girls Roast"
2022	RuPaul's Drag Race (season 14)	Guest	Episode: "The Ross Matthews Roast"
2022	RuPaul's Drag Race Down Under (season 2)	Guest	Episode: "Drag Family Makeover"
2023	RuPaul's Drag Race (season 15)	Guest	Episode: "Teacher Makeovers"
2023	RuPaul's Drag Race Down Under (season 3)	Guest	Episode: "Terriers in Tiaras"
2023	Drag Race Brasil (season 1)	Guest	Episode: "Carnaval Makeover"
2023	Drag Race Germany (season 1)	Guest	Episode: "Finale"
2023	Drag Race Italia (season 3)	Guest	Episode: "Social Media Queens"
2023	Drag Race México (season 1)	Guest	Episode: "Snatch Game"
2023	Drag Race Philippines (season 2)	Guest	Episode: "Twinning: The Shequel"
2024	RuPaul's Drag Race (season 16)	Guest	Episode: "Bathroom Hunties"
2024	RuPaul's Drag Race Global All Stars	Guest	Episode: "It's 5 O'Clock Somewhere"
2025	RuPaul's Drag Race (season 17)	Guest	Episode: "Let's Get Sea Sickening Ball"
