= Goldhouse =

American DJ, producer, singer, and songwriter

- Also known as: Breathe Electric (2007–2012)
- Born: Grant Harris; April 19, 1989 (age 37); Lake County, Illinois, United States
- Genres: EDM; electropop; house
- Occupations: DJ; producer; singer; songwriter
- Years active: 2012–present
- Labels: Armada; Priority; Capitol

Grant Harris, also known by his stage name Goldhouse (stylized: GOLDHOUSE), is an American DJ, producer, singer and songwriter, based in Chicago. He gained recognition for remixing songs like Sam Smith's "Stay with Me", Fleetwood Mac's "Dreams", Katy Perry's "Dark Horse" and Lady Gaga's "Applause". His songs have received airplay on stations such as Hits1, Sirius BPM, B96 Chicago, Pulse 87 and KHNC Seattle.

== Career ==
Goldhouse started writing music in his dorm during high school and realized his desire to pursue a musical career after receiving positive responses from his online community. He began releasing music under the moniker Breathe Electric in 2008.

In 2012, he released the EPs All Night Long and The Morning After.

In 2015, the single "Over" was released by Goldhouse.

In 2016, Goldhouse collaborated with Lostboycrow to release "Free From The Start" as a single.

In 2017, he released the single "Sex on Me" through Armin van Buuren's record label Armada. He also featured on Martin Garrix's Scared to Be Lonely remix EP, with his own remix of the song. His song "When I Come Home" has peaked at No. 17 on the Billboard Dance Club Songs chart as of April 2017. A compilation video for the song was released on YouTube, featuring a "military homecoming" theme.

In 2018, he released the song "Don't Go", which features singer Cappa. Goldhouse, in an interview, said "[The song] started with just a simple chord progression I wrote that had such a bittersweet feel to it."

== Discography ==
=== Charted singles ===
Title	Year	Peak chart positions
Title	Year	US Club
"When I Come Home"	2015	15

=== Other singles ===
Adapted from iTunes.

Title	Year
"When I Come Home"	2015
"Over"	2015
"On & On"	2016
"Free from the Start" (with Lostboycrow)	2016
"Pleasure" (featuring Alexx Mack)	2016
"Sex on Me"	2017
"Don't Go" (featuring CAPPA)	2018
"I Don't Wanna Know" (with Mokita)"	2019

=== Remixes ===
- Lady Gaga – "Applause" (2013)
- Fleetwood Mac – "Dreams" (2014)
- Sam Smith – "Stay With Me" (2014)
- Shy Girls – "Clean Cut" (2015)
- Billie Eilish – "Ocean Eyes" (2016)
- The Barons - “American High” (2018)
- Lights - "Lost Girls" (2019)
- Saint Motel - "Van Horn" (2020)
- Cameron Hawthorn – "Oh Hot Damn!" (2020)
- Beth Hart – “Sugar Shack" (2020)
- Neon Trees - “Used to Like" (2020)
