= PJ and Thomas =

American Internet and TV personalities

- Born: Timothy Paul Jasper McKay: May 24, 1986 (age 40); Thomas Hamon: March 30, 1991 (age 35); Cleveland, Tennessee, U.S.
- Occupations: Internet celebrities; television personalities; interior designers
- Spouse: Married in 2015
- Children: 3

YouTube information
- Channel: PJ and Thomas
- Years active: 2015–present
- Genre: Docuseries
- Subscribers: 152 thousand
- Views: 23.7 million
- Last updated: January 7, 2025

PJ and Thomas is the media franchise of Timothy Paul Jasper "PJ" McKay (born 1986) and Thomas McKay (né Hamon; born 1991), an American couple who are Internet celebrities, YouTubers, television personalities, remodelers, and interior designers, best known for their YouTube channel as well as their renovation and interior design TV show Down to the Studs on HGTV.

In 2015, they launched the YouTube channel "PJ and Thomas", which focuses on their personal and professional lives, along with a website, Instagram and Twitter accounts, concerned with lifestyle and documenting the process of their remodeling and decorating projects.

== Backgrounds ==
PJ McKay was born and raised in Cleveland, Tennessee, and attended Bradley Central High School. He started modeling through the "Ambiance" modeling agency and International Modeling and Talent Association in New York but left to conclude his education. After getting his Bachelor of Arts in psychology from the University of Tennessee at Chattanooga, and a two-year degree in construction technology from Cleveland State Community College, he started pursuing acting by appearing on TV shows as background actor in Atlanta, including cameos on the fourth season of The Vampire Diaries, the second season of Teen Wolf, season four of Drop Dead Diva, and the 2012 film, Joyful Noise. He eventually started working as a real estate agent in his hometown.

Thomas Hamon who was also born and raised in Cleveland quit his job along with his spouse in 2019 with the aim of focusing more on their business and social media participation.

== Media career ==
=== Online ===
After getting married in 2015, they launched their joint YouTube channel titled "PJ and Thomas (The Property Lovers)" to document their journey of renovating their 1950s house in their hometown of Tennessee along with sharing vlogs about the process of their other DIY makeovers. They became social media influencers and eventually developed a more diverse range of content including health and fitness, tourism, leisure, fashion, decorating, homosexuality in society, homosexual adoption and parenting, and societal attitudes toward homosexuality.

=== Reality television ===
In 2017, HGTV premiered a show titled Down to the Studs featuring the McKays as the first homosexual couple to host a show on the network. The show which aired on June 24, follows the course of purchasing, renovating, designing, and flipping houses by the couple. Country Living described their style in remodeling as "more traditional than existing HGTV shows [...] blending vintage with modern." In an interview about the show, they stated, 'showing America what the city has to offer and the type of homes that are in this area. it's something that we feel very strongly about' They added, 'Once the opportunity presented itself, we were excited to be husbands on TV and having the gay community be excited about the show.'

Later, the couple also appeared on the online series "Clash of the Crafters". and the finished design and decoration project of their house was featured in the March 2018 issue of Design*Sponge.

== Other activities ==
=== Investments and endorsements ===
Outside of their media projects, the couple work in real estate development, real estate investing, and selling apparel, merchandise, and accessories to their audience.

They have also been involved in marketing initiatives and endorsing brands.

=== Activism ===
The McKays have engaged in charitable causes by donating money and using their platform to raise awareness, including adoption campaigning, promoting gay rights, pro-feminism, participation in HIV/AIDS activism, and advocacy for refugees.

== Personal life ==
The couple started dating in 2010 and, after mutual marriage proposals, wed in 2015. Originally planning for a destination wedding at a beach, the couple eventually decided to get married right after same-sex marriage became legal in an intimate ceremony at their house. In 2019, the couple got their foster care license and fostered three siblings aged 18 months, 2 1/2, and 4 years old. In 2021 they legally adopted their foster children. The family lives in Chattanooga, Tennessee.
