= Cultural impact of Dolly Parton =

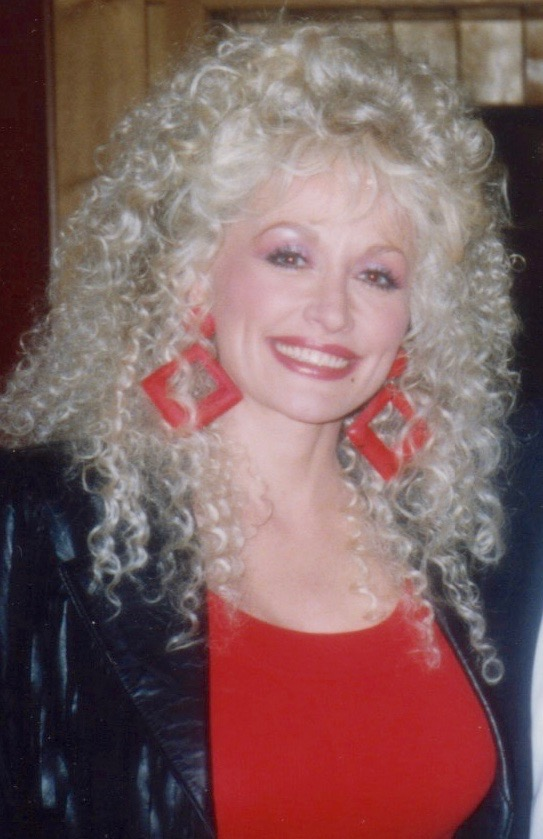
Dolly Parton at a recording session in 1989

American singer-songwriter Dolly Parton (1946–2026) began her career in country music and later worked in pop music, film, television, tourism and philanthropy. She first became nationally known in the late 1960s through The Porter Wagoner Show and her recordings with Porter Wagoner. By the late 1970s she had found a larger pop audience, while continuing to identify herself with East Tennessee and the Appalachian settings of many of her songs.

Parton's reputation as a songwriter rests partly on her portrayals of poverty, family, religion, work and women's lives. Musicologist Lydia R. Hamessley has argued that Parton's fame and appearance sometimes drew attention away from the craft of songs such as "Coat of Many Colors", "Down from Dover", "Jolene" and "9 to 5". Her country-to-pop crossover and the many later recordings of her compositions widened the audience for her work. Her control of her publishing also became a recurring part of accounts of her career.

Parton made her appearance part of the act. She favored wigs, heavy makeup, rhinestones and fitted stage clothes, and readily acknowledged both cosmetic surgery and the work required to maintain her image. Scholars have written about the apparent contradiction between this deliberate artificiality and her claims to sincerity and rural authenticity. Her combination of conventional femininity, sexual display, humor and business authority has produced differing feminist readings, as well as discussion of her place in camp and LGBTQ culture.

Her identification with Appalachia was expressed through autobiographical songs, Dollywood and charitable programs based in Sevier County. The best known of these, Dolly Parton's Imagination Library, grew from a local book-gifting program into an international organization. Parton's music, visual image, regional ties, business career and philanthropy have consequently been studied in musicology, Appalachian studies, gender studies and other fields.

== Music and songwriting ==
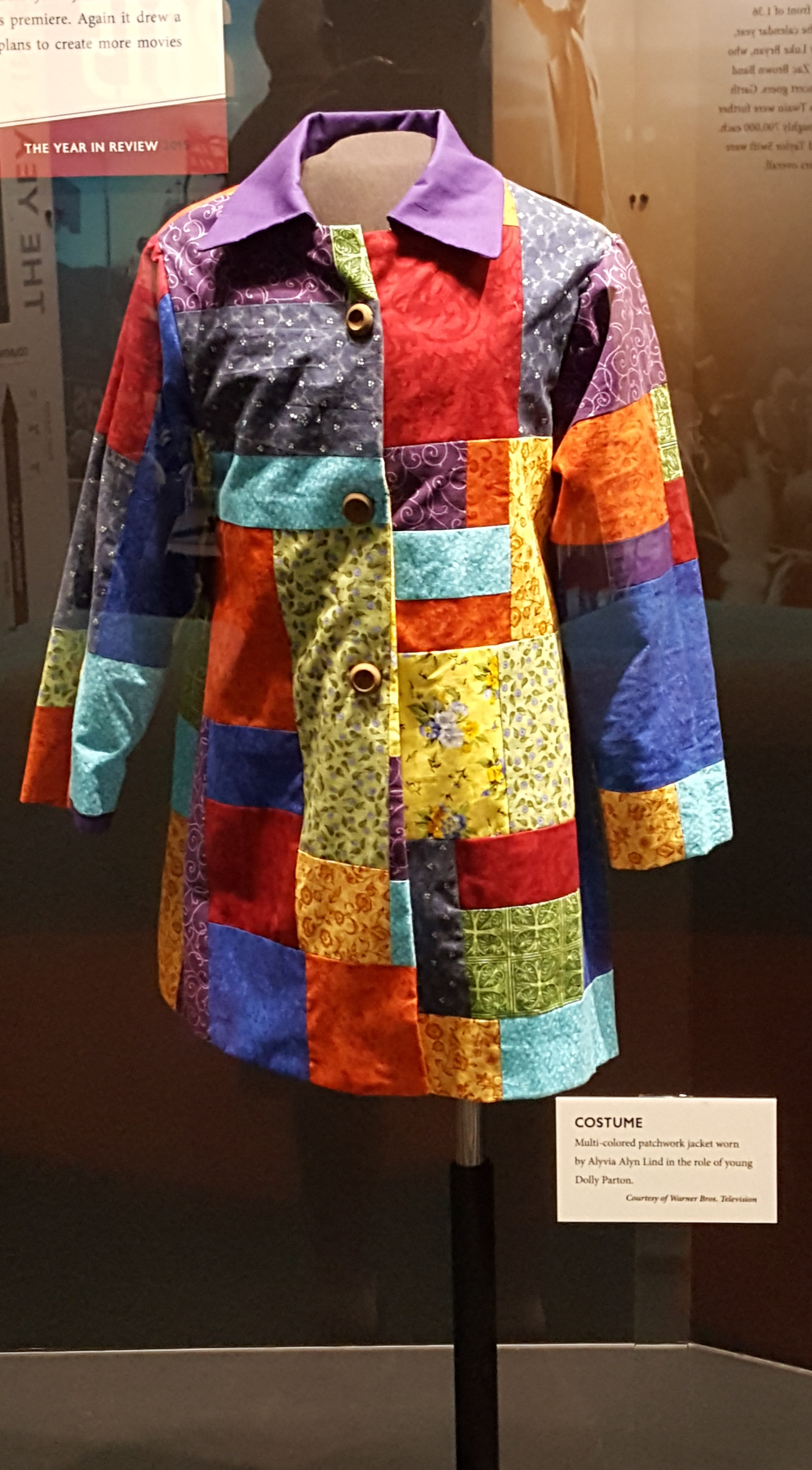
A coat displayed in a Country Music Hall of Fame and Museum exhibition about Parton and "Coat of Many Colors".

Hamessley's Unlikely Angel is devoted to Parton as a songwriter. It groups her work by subjects including Appalachia, women, love, tragedy and religion, and examines the melodies and song structures as well as the lyrics. Parton often wrote in the first person and told a complete story within a few verses. Her narrators include children, wives, working women, abandoned lovers and people living under economic or social pressure.

The mountain songs are not uniformly nostalgic. "Coat of Many Colors" recalls childhood poverty through a coat made from scraps, the pride instilled by the narrator's mother and the ridicule of schoolmates. "In the Good Old Days (When Times Were Bad)" values family ties but rejects any wish to return to hunger and hard labor. Hamessley places both within Parton's larger use of the language and musical traditions she learned in the Smoky Mountains.

Women in Parton's songs frequently face judgments that do not apply to men. "Just Because I'm a Woman" addresses a sexual double standard, while "Down from Dover" tells the story of an unmarried pregnant woman abandoned by her lover. "The Bridge" ends with a pregnant narrator contemplating suicide. Although Parton did not present them as political statements, the songs later became important to feminist readings of her work. "9 to 5", written for the 1980 film, dealt more directly with paid work: low wages, routine and a male boss taking credit for his employees' ideas. Sarah Smarsh has placed the song among Parton's depictions of women whose labor and financial difficulties were familiar to working-class listeners.

Parton's move toward pop production in the late 1970s did not amount to a clean break with country music. Mitchell Morris writes that the crossover worked because the polished records and glamorous presentation remained attached to a recognizably rural and Southern performer. Leigh H. Edwards similarly argues that Parton carried familiar elements of her country persona into pop recordings, films and television rather than replacing it with a separate image. The crossover brought Parton's songwriting to listeners who had not followed her earlier Nashville work, though it also prompted periodic criticism from country audiences and reviewers.

"I Will Always Love You" is the clearest example of a Parton composition moving between genres. Her original recording was a country ballad written during her departure from Wagoner's organization. Whitney Houston's 1992 recording recast the song as a pop and R&B vocal showcase and became the version best known to much of the international public. The success of Houston's recording also drew attention to Parton's ownership of the composition. "Jolene" has likewise been recorded in numerous styles. Nadine Hubbs used the song to examine genre and homoerotic possibility in country music, concentrating on the narrator's detailed address to the woman she fears will take her partner.

== Influence on other artists ==
Parton's songwriting and public image became reference points for later country and pop performers. In a 2019 interview with Billboard, Kacey Musgraves called Parton the "ultimate songwriter" and cited her songwriting, humor, self-presentation and support for LGBTQ people among the qualities she admired. Shania Twain described Parton as her musical and personal hero during a 2003 television appearance and later referred to her as a mentor and songwriting teacher.

Kesha has described Parton as a mentor and "guiding light". A 2022 Rolling Stone profile examined Parton's importance to Kesha, who recorded "Old Flames Can't Hold a Candle to You" with her for the album Rainbow (2017). In 2025, critics for The New York Times examined Parton's influence on the country-pop sound and presentation of Sabrina Carpenter's "Manchild".

Parton's influence has also been reflected in the work of later country artists. Lainey Wilson drew on Parton's example for her 2020 song "WWDD", whose title refers to "What Would Dolly Do?" and whose accompanying video was presented as an homage to Parton's influence.

== Public image and gender ==
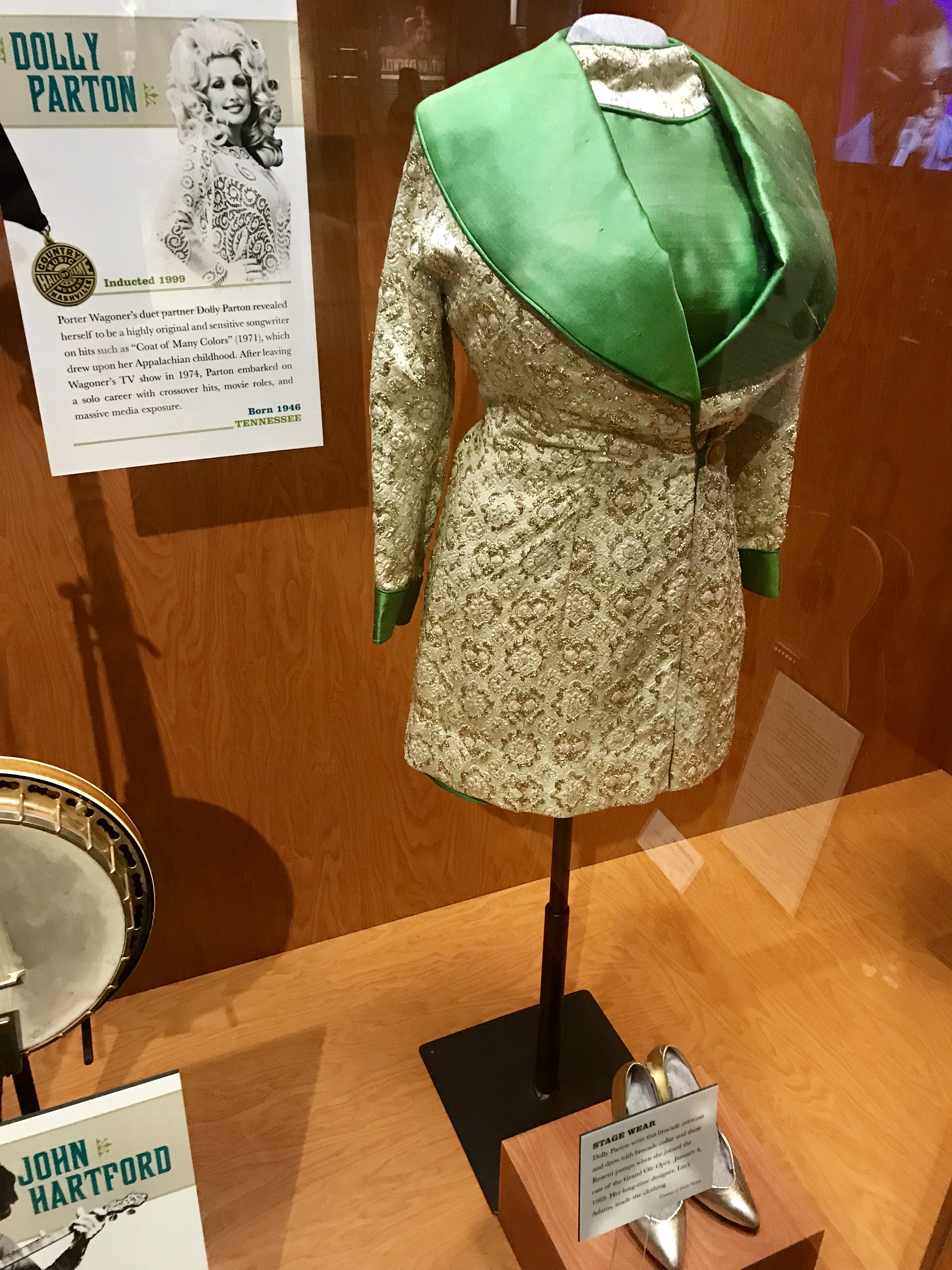
Stage clothing worn by Parton when she joined the Grand Ole Opry cast in 1969, displayed at the Country Music Hall of Fame and Museum.

Parton's high blond hair, heavy makeup, long nails and rhinestone costumes were recognizable well before she became a pop performer. She did not claim that the look was natural. In interviews she discussed wigs and cosmetic surgery openly, often making the joke before an interviewer could. Edwards describes the image as a meeting of two stock characters: the wholesome mountain girl and the conspicuously sexual blond. Parton used both throughout her career, altering the clothes and settings without abandoning either figure.

She repeatedly traced her taste in clothes and makeup to a woman she saw as a child in her hometown. Adults disparaged the woman as "trash"; Parton remembered seeing glamour. The story became a standard part of her account of how she chose her appearance. Writing in The Atlantic, Sally Jenkins argued that Parton's refusal to dress according to expectations of respectability was closely tied to her control over her career and public self.

The look posed a problem for ideas of authenticity in country music, which have often favored an unpolished appearance and an apparent closeness to rural life. Parton answered it by distinguishing appearance from character. She called the outward Dolly artificial while presenting her humor, musical ability and Appalachian background as genuine. Edwards argues that this open admission made the artifice less a deception than a form of performance. It also gave Parton a way to respond to questions about her body without giving up the image that prompted them.

Interpretations of that strategy have varied. Some critics have regarded her use of an exaggerated feminine style as self-directed and comic; others have noted that her success still depended partly on a narrow and sexualized standard of female appearance. Edwards treats the ambiguity as important to the persona, rather than describing it as either straightforward conformity or uncomplicated subversion.

=== Feminist interpretations ===
Parton generally avoided calling herself a feminist, although she stated that women should have the same opportunities as men. Her songs and working life have nevertheless been read in feminist terms for decades. In 1987, Ms. named her one of its women of the year; Gloria Steinem wrote that Parton had turned devalued signs of femininity to her own purposes and used her business position to assist women and poor people.

Smarsh's She Come By It Natural considers Parton from the perspective of rural and working-class women who may not identify with the language or institutions of organized feminism. Smarsh focuses on material concerns in the songs—poorly paid work, dependence on men, sexual stigma and responsibility for keeping families together—and on Parton's own escape from restrictive professional relationships. Lauren Michele Jackson observed that Smarsh's argument depends less on Parton's public positions than on what her career and songs made available to listeners.

Lynn Melnick's I've Had to Think Up a Way to Survive combines cultural criticism with memoir. Melnick writes about Parton's songs in relation to sexual violence, trauma and recovery, giving particular attention to women in the lyrics who are threatened, judged or trying to begin again. The book focuses on how listeners have used and understood Parton's work rather than on establishing Parton's own political views.

Parton's ownership of her songwriting has also figured in these accounts. She controlled her publishing and declined a proposed recording of "I Will Always Love You" by Elvis Presley because Presley's manager demanded half of the publishing rights. The story is often told for its later financial consequences, but it also supplies a concrete example of a female songwriter protecting her work in a male-dominated industry.

== Appalachia and Dollywood ==
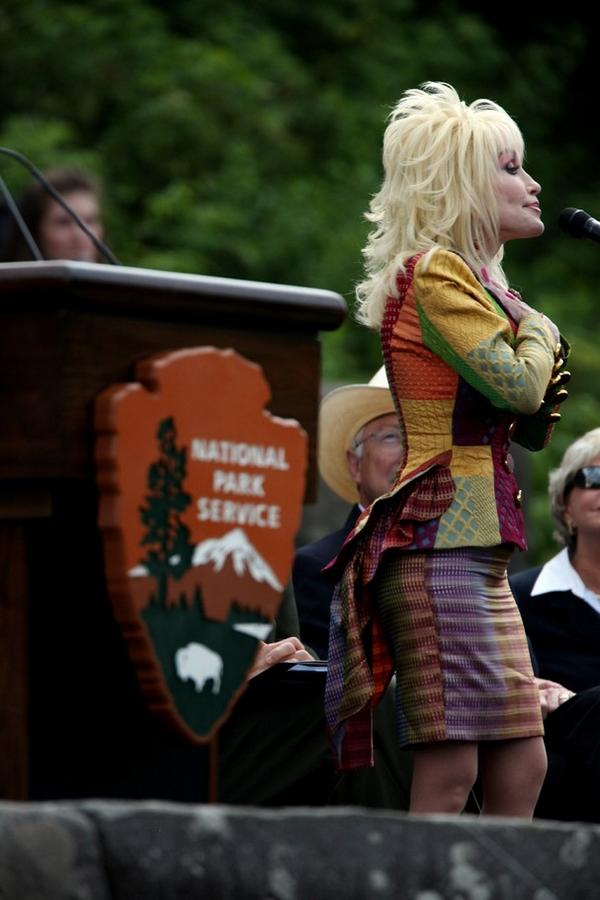
Parton at a rededication ceremony for Great Smoky Mountains National Park in 2009.

Parton continued to speak with an East Tennessee accent and to write about the Smoky Mountains after moving into pop music and Hollywood films. Family labor, church music, the cabin where she grew up and the scarcity of money appear repeatedly in her songs and autobiographical stories. These elements became central to her public identification with Appalachia, which drew heavily on her family history and her account of leaving rural poverty.

Graham Hoppe has examined Parton's use of the word "hillbilly", a label that can carry assumptions of ignorance, isolation and poor taste. He argues that she did not discard the stereotype so much as play against it. Regional speech, stories of poverty and jokes about being underestimated could mark her as a hillbilly, while her success as a songwriter and business owner made the usual judgment behind the term harder to sustain. The glamorous appearance mattered here: Parton could display wealth and ambition without presenting them as evidence that she had left the mountains behind.

Critics have also questioned whether Parton's account of Appalachia could romanticize poverty. James Barker argues that stories emphasizing hardship, family solidarity and eventual success can present an incomplete picture of the region and reinforce ideas of country authenticity centered on whiteness. Some of Parton's songs are less nostalgic. In "In the Good Old Days (When Times Were Bad)", the narrator values family ties but rejects any desire to return to hunger and exhausting labor.

=== Dollywood ===
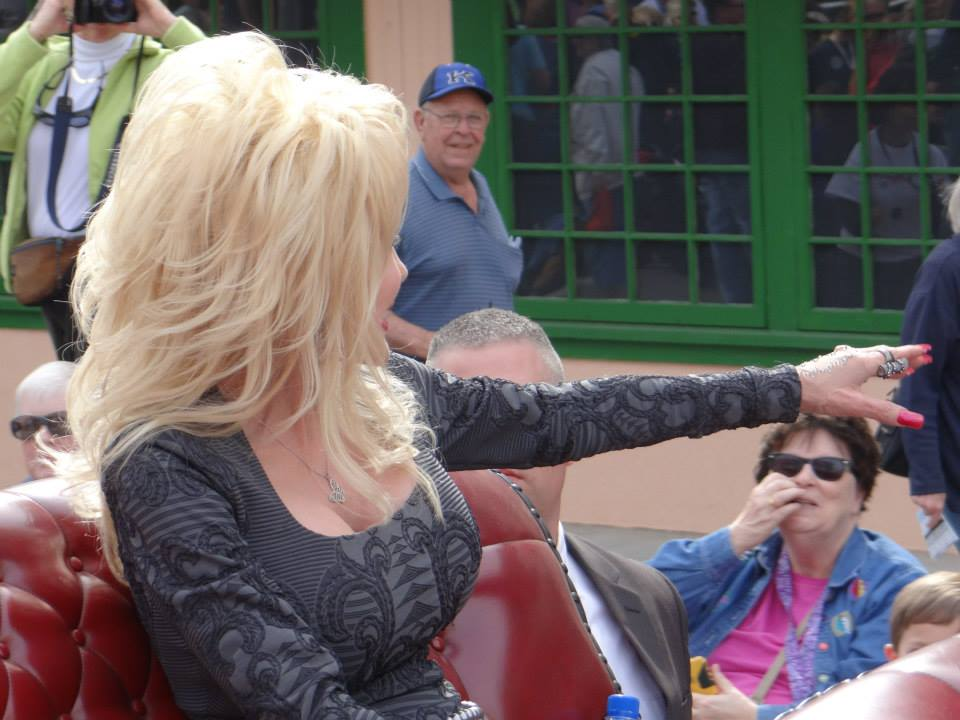
Parton at Dollywood in 2014.

Parton became a co-owner of a Pigeon Forge theme park in 1986 and renamed it Dollywood. It joined amusement rides with music, food, crafts and stories associated with the southern mountains. In Gone Dollywood, Hoppe examines the park as a commercial version of Appalachia. Its presentation is selective and often nostalgic, but he argues that it also complicates some outsiders' expectations of the region and provides a prominent setting for local performers and craft traditions.

The park also connected Parton's origin story to employment and tourism in the county she had left. It became Sevier County's largest employer and one of Tennessee's leading tourist attractions. This economic role is part of why Dollywood receives attention in Appalachian studies: the park sells a version of the regional past while participating in the modern tourist economy that has reshaped the area.

== LGBTQ+ cultural significance ==
Parton had a significant gay and LGBTQ+ following for much of her career. Writers have connected that following to her exaggerated femininity, humor, songs about outsiders, stories of escape and reinvention, and refusal to condemn LGBTQ+ people. Her appearance also became a familiar subject of drag performance and camp interpretation.

Barker describes Parton's public identity as something built not only through her own performances but also through the stories told by listeners. He reads "Coat of Many Colors" as a song in which shame imposed by others is answered with pride, and "My Tennessee Mountain Home" as offering some LGBTQ+ country listeners a way to imagine belonging and home. These are readings of the songs' reception, not claims about Parton's intentions. Hubbs's analysis of "Jolene" likewise concerns possibilities opened by the performance and language of the song rather than a hidden account of its composition.

Parton's statements contributed to this relationship with her audience. She supported same-sex marriage and later criticized measures directed at transgender people. Her language on the subject was commonly Christian: she described LGBTQ+ people as God's children and made acceptance, rather than doctrine or party politics, the point of her remarks. An Associated Press account found that this was especially meaningful to some LGBTQ+ Christians, while also noting complaints from admirers who wanted her to take more direct political positions.

== Philanthropy ==
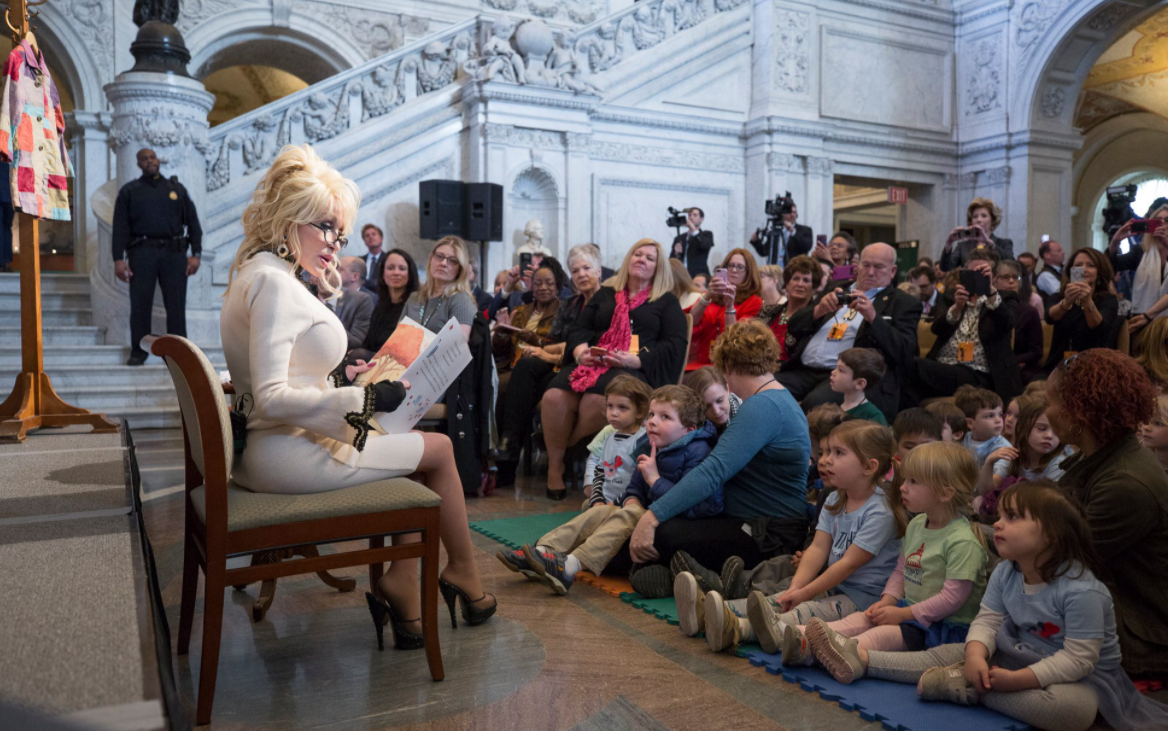
Parton reading to children in the Great Hall of the Library of Congress in 2018.

Parton's charitable work was concentrated for many years in East Tennessee. The Dollywood Foundation, founded in 1988, initially supported education in Sevier County. In 1995 it established Dolly Parton's Imagination Library, which mailed a book each month to participating children from birth to age five. The program later expanded through local partners across the United States and into Canada, the United Kingdom, Australia and Ireland.

Parton said that the library was inspired by her father, who could not read or write. Eligibility was based on a child's age and residence in a participating area rather than family income. This kept the program connected to her account of poverty without restricting it to poor households. Its reliance on recurring book deliveries also distinguished it from one-time celebrity gifts: children received books in their own names, while local organizations helped finance and administer the service. By the time of Parton's death, more than 300 million books had been distributed. Time identified the Imagination Library as the central program in Parton's philanthropy when it included her in the 2025 TIME100 Philanthropy list.

Other projects followed the same regional emphasis. After the 2016 Great Smoky Mountains wildfires, the My People Fund made monthly cash payments to families whose primary homes had been destroyed; it eventually distributed $12.5 million. Parton and her East Tennessee businesses also contributed to flood relief after Hurricane Helene. Her medical giving included support for pediatric infectious-disease research and a $1 million donation to coronavirus research at Vanderbilt University Medical Center in 2020.

Coverage of Parton's philanthropy often connected these programs to subjects familiar from her music and life story, including childhood poverty, family, literacy and East Tennessee. Reports also examined how the programs worked, rather than focusing only on the amounts she donated.

== Academic study ==
Parton became the subject of a substantial body of academic and critical writing. Hamessley analyzes the construction and musical language of the songs; Edwards studies gender, media and the public persona; Morris places her crossover within 1970s popular music; and Hoppe uses Dollywood to consider tourism and Appalachian representation. Hubbs and Barker examine queer listening in country music, while Smarsh and Melnick approach the songs through working-class feminism, memoir and trauma. These studies often disagree about the balance between conformity and independence in Parton's image, or between regional representation and stereotype.

Academic interest also entered teaching and public media. A University of Tennessee history course called "Dolly's America: From Sevierville to the World" provided the name and part of the premise for the 2019 podcast Dolly Parton's America. The series used Parton's career to discuss country music, class, gender, religion and divisions in American life.

== Public response to her death ==
Parton's death on August 25, 2026, prompted public commemorations in the United States and other countries. Reuters described responses from musicians, political leaders and fans across several continents. The King's Guard performed "9 to 5" outside Buckingham Palace, while the Empire State Building was illuminated in pink.

In the United States, President Donald Trump ordered American flags flown at half-staff at the White House, federal buildings, military posts, naval stations and federal vessels until sunset on September 1. The order applied throughout the United States and its territories and possessions.

== See also ==
- Appalachian music
- Women in music
