= Mario Dedivanovic =

American makeup artist (born 1983)

Mario Dedivanovic (born October 1, 1983) is an American makeup artist and businessman.

== Early life ==
Dedivanovic was raised in the Bronx, New York, by Albanian parents from Montenegro. As a child he worked at the Bronx Zoo.

== Career ==
Before becoming a makeup artist, Dedivanovic worked at the fragrance counter at Sephora at its Flatiron location in Manhattan. He later worked as a representative for LORAC, as well as doing makeup at Saks’ Armani counter and for Fox newscasters Megyn Kelly and Julie Banderas.

His first celebrity client was Natasha Bedingfield. Other celebrity clients have included Kate Bosworth, Naomie Harris, Jennifer Lopez, Salma Hayek, Demi Lovato, and a years-long collaboration with Kim Kardashian that began in 2008. With Kardashian, he popularized the practice of facial contouring. He also originated the Masterclass event, in which Dedivanovic delivers live makeup tutorials and educational programming.

In 2020, he launched Makeup By Mario, his eponymous brand.

== Personal life ==
Dedivanovic is gay, and publicly came out in November 2019.

He has cited makeup artists François Nars and Allan "Whitey" Snyder as some of his professional inspirations.

== Awards ==
- Artistic Achievement Award, American Influencer Awards (2019)
