= LGBTQ representation in country music =

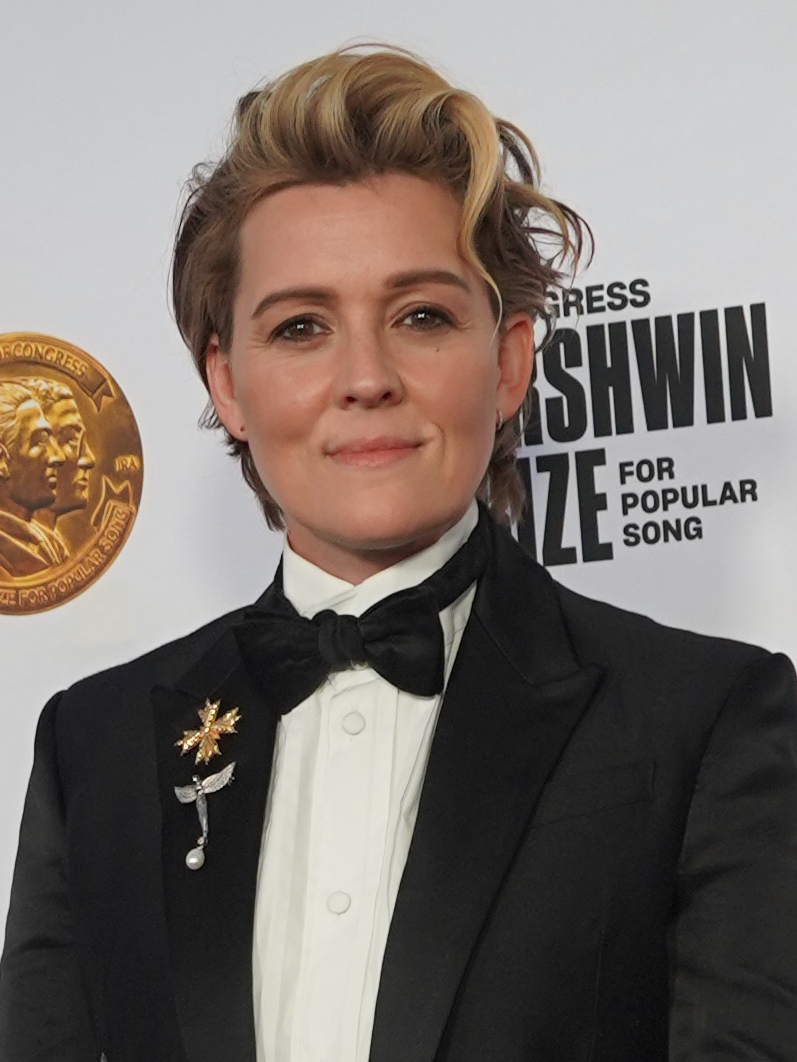
Brandi Carlile

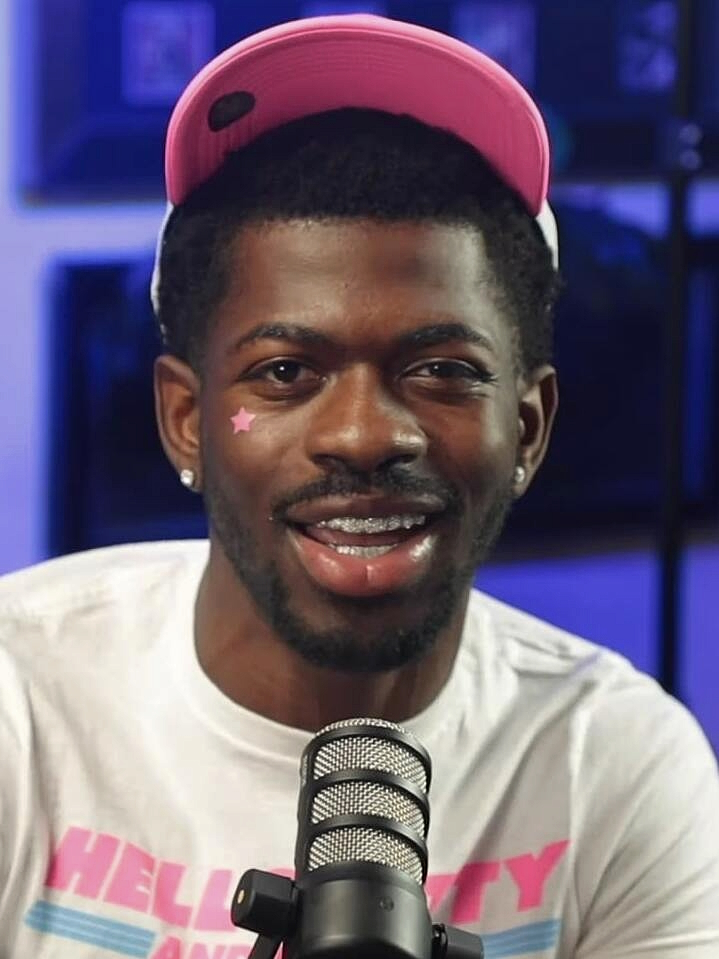
Lil Nas X

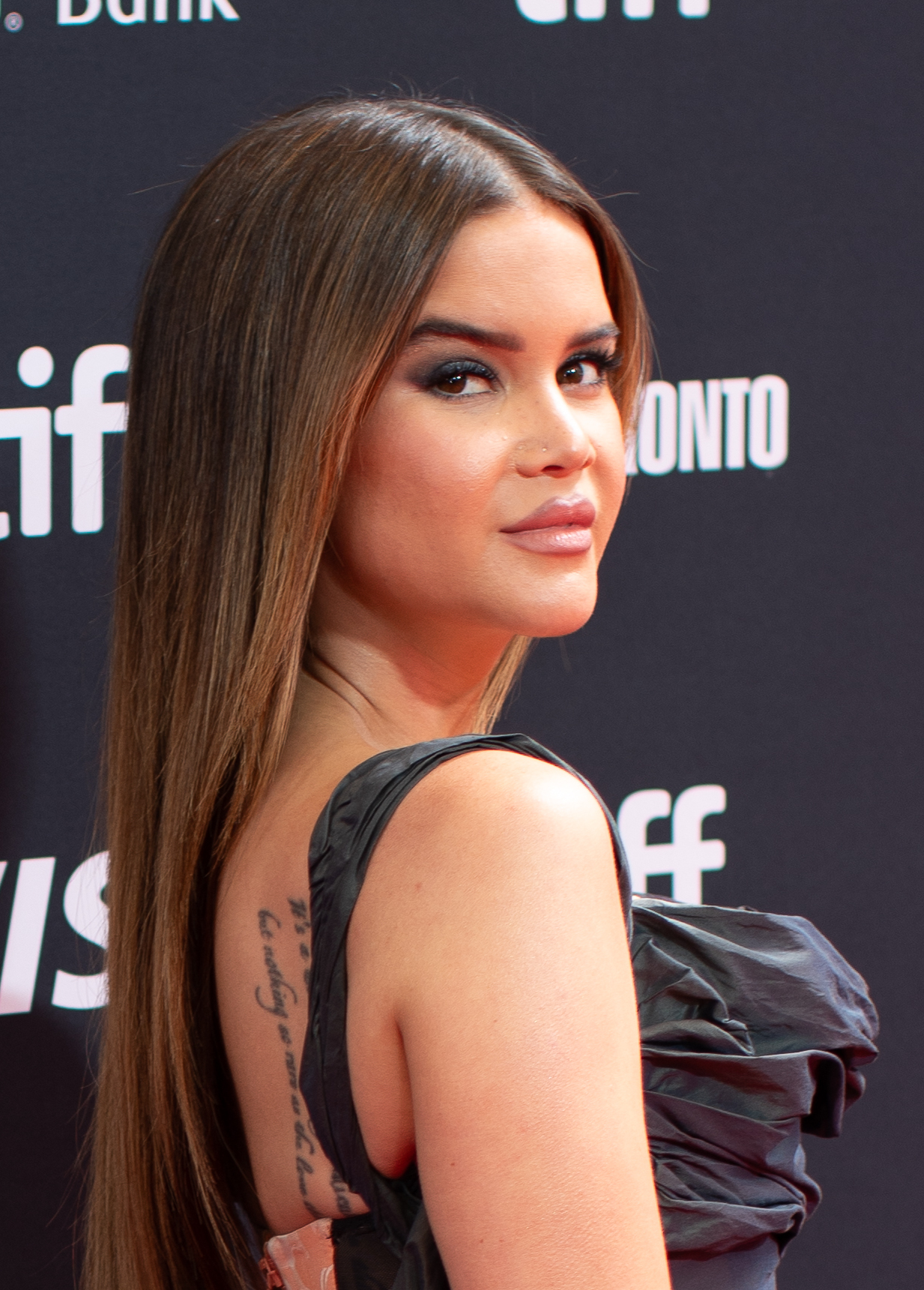
Maren Morris

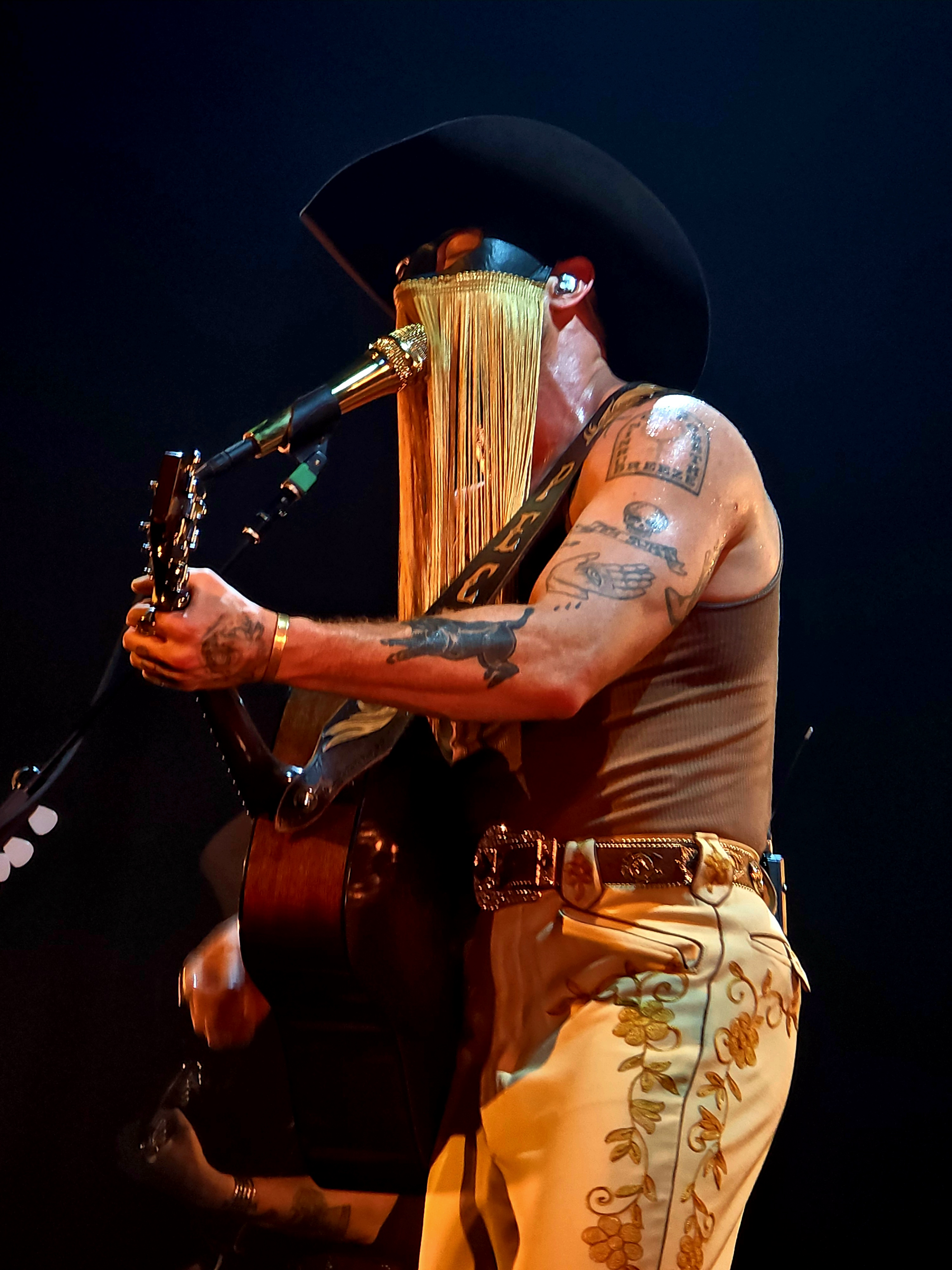
Orville Peck

There has been a longtime but relatively unknown history of LGBTQ representation in country music. LGBTQ visibility in the genre has increased since the 2010s. Modern LGBTQ country musicians include Brandi Carlile, Brandy Clark, Lil Nas X, Maren Morris, Grant MacDonald, Cameron Hawthorn, Orville Peck, TJ Osborne, and drag performer Trixie Mattel.

== History ==
Artist and gay liberation activist Patrick Haggerty formed the band Lavender Country in 1972. The band's self-titled first album, released in 1973, has been credited as the first openly gay country album. In 1992, Grammy-winning country singer k.d. lang came out as a lesbian.

In 2023, Dixon Dallas released "Good Lookin'", which quickly became a viral song due to its catchy tune combined with its lyrics graphically describing gay sex and later released two more songs centering around gay love and gay sex. Queer country anthems include "The Giver" (2025) by Chappell Roan.

Los Angeles has seen a monthly country karaoke event for the LGBTQ community.

== See also ==
- "Cowboys Are Frequently, Secretly Fond of Each Other"
- Dolly Parton as a gay icon
- LGBTQ music
- LGBTQ representation in hip-hop
- LGBTQ representation in jazz
- Reba McEntire as a gay icon
