= Read U Wrote U =

"Read U Wrote U" (Ellis Miah mix)

Single by RuPaul featuring the cast of RuPaul's Drag Race All Stars season 2
- Released: October 12, 2016
- Length: 5:22
- Label: World of Wonder
- Songwriters: RuPaul; Ellis Miah; Alaska Thunderfuck; Detox; Katya Zamolodchikova; Roxxxy Andrews
- Producer: Ellis Miah

RuPaul singles chronology
"The Realness" (2016)	"Read U Wrote U" (Ellis Miah mix) (2016)	"Snapshot" (remix) (2017)

Performance video
- "Read U Wrote U" on YouTube

"Read U Wrote U" is a song recorded by the American drag queen RuPaul featuring the American drag performers Alaska Thunderfuck, Detox, Katya Zamolodchikova and Roxxxy Andrews, credited as the cast of the second season of RuPaul's Drag Race All Stars. The featured contestants each wrote their own rap verses, while RuPaul and Ellis Miah wrote the remainder of the track, with the latter also serving as producer.

The song was released on October 12, 2016 by World of Wonder Productions as the "Ellis Miah mix", one day before the premiere of the RuPaul's Drag Race All Stars episode "All Stars Supergroup", which documented the writing and recording process of the contestants' verses, alongside a lip sync performance of the track. It peaked at number 29 on Billboard's Hot Dance/Electronic Songs chart and at number 14 on its Dance/Electronic Digital Songs chart.

The song was met positively amongst critics, who often ranked "Read U Wrote U" among the best performances in the Drag Race franchise, praising the contestants' rap verse lyrics and performance. Roxxxy Andrews' verse, though initially met with mixed reception, was later reappraised and became an internet meme. The track was revisited in 2020 for Digital DragCon, when the featured contestants reunited virtually to perform it following the cancellation of in-person events during the COVID-19 pandemic.

== Background and release ==
On July 22, 2015, it was announced RuPaul's Drag Race All Stars was renewed for a second season by Logo TV. Its cast was revealed on June 17, 2016, alongside its premiere date of August 25 by Entertainment Weekly. Alaska Thunderfuck, Detox, Katya Zamolodchikova and Roxxxy Andrews were announced as finalists during the season's seventh episode, "Family That Drags Together", following the elimination of Alyssa Edwards.

"Read U Wrote U" (Ellis Miah mix) was released on music streaming and digital download platforms on October 12, 2016 by World of Wonder Productions. The following day, the eighth and final episode of the season, "All Stars Supergroup", was premiered, documenting the finalists recording their verses and rehearsal process before their performance of the song.

== Composition and development ==
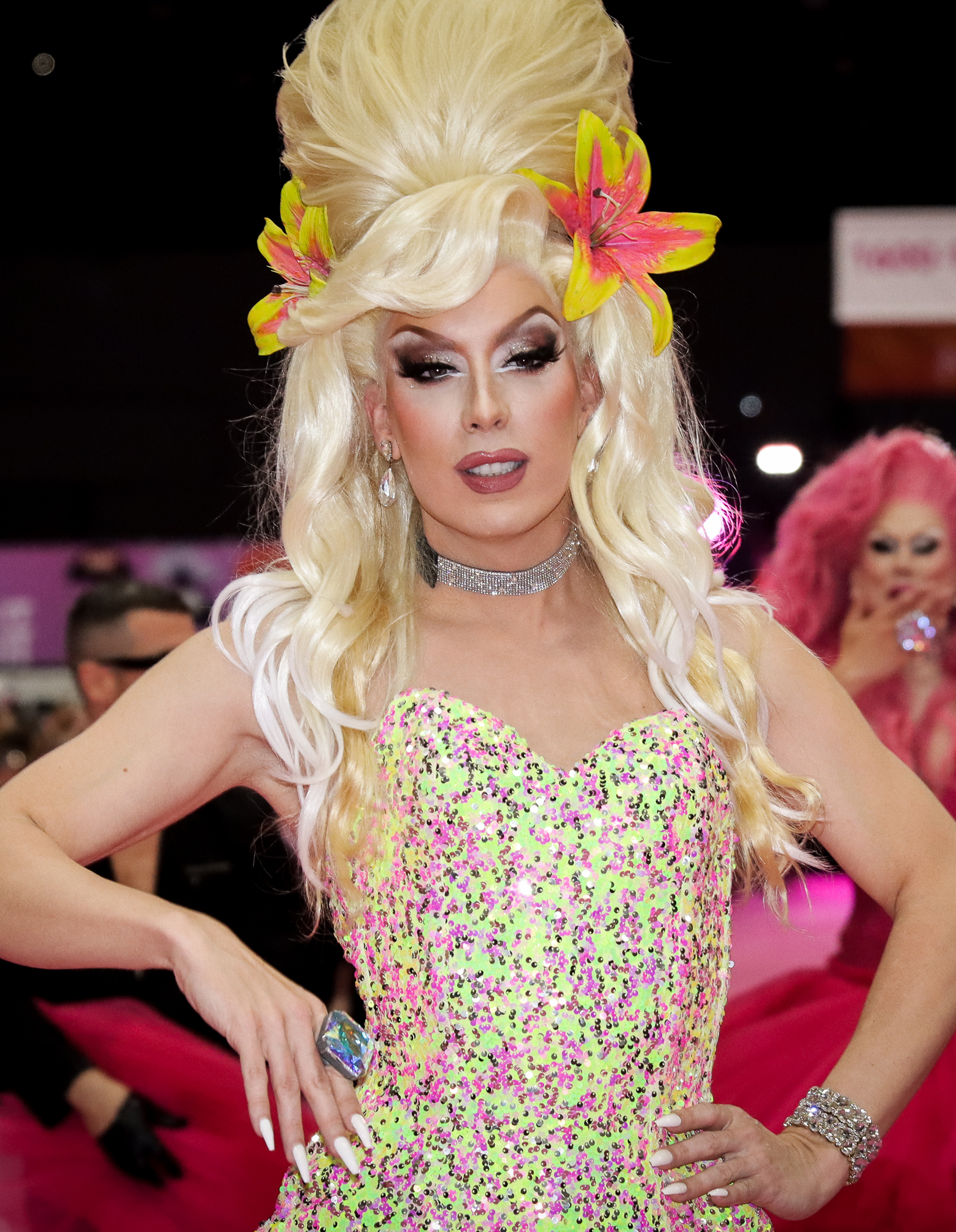
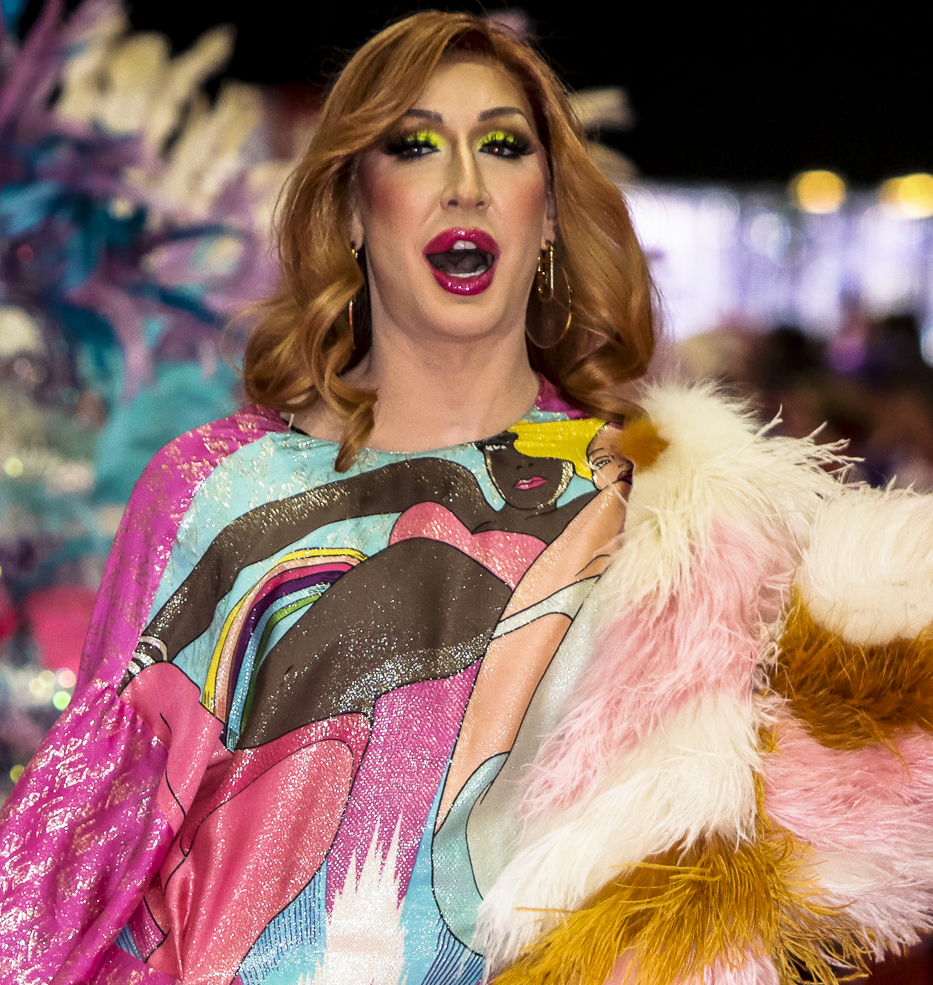
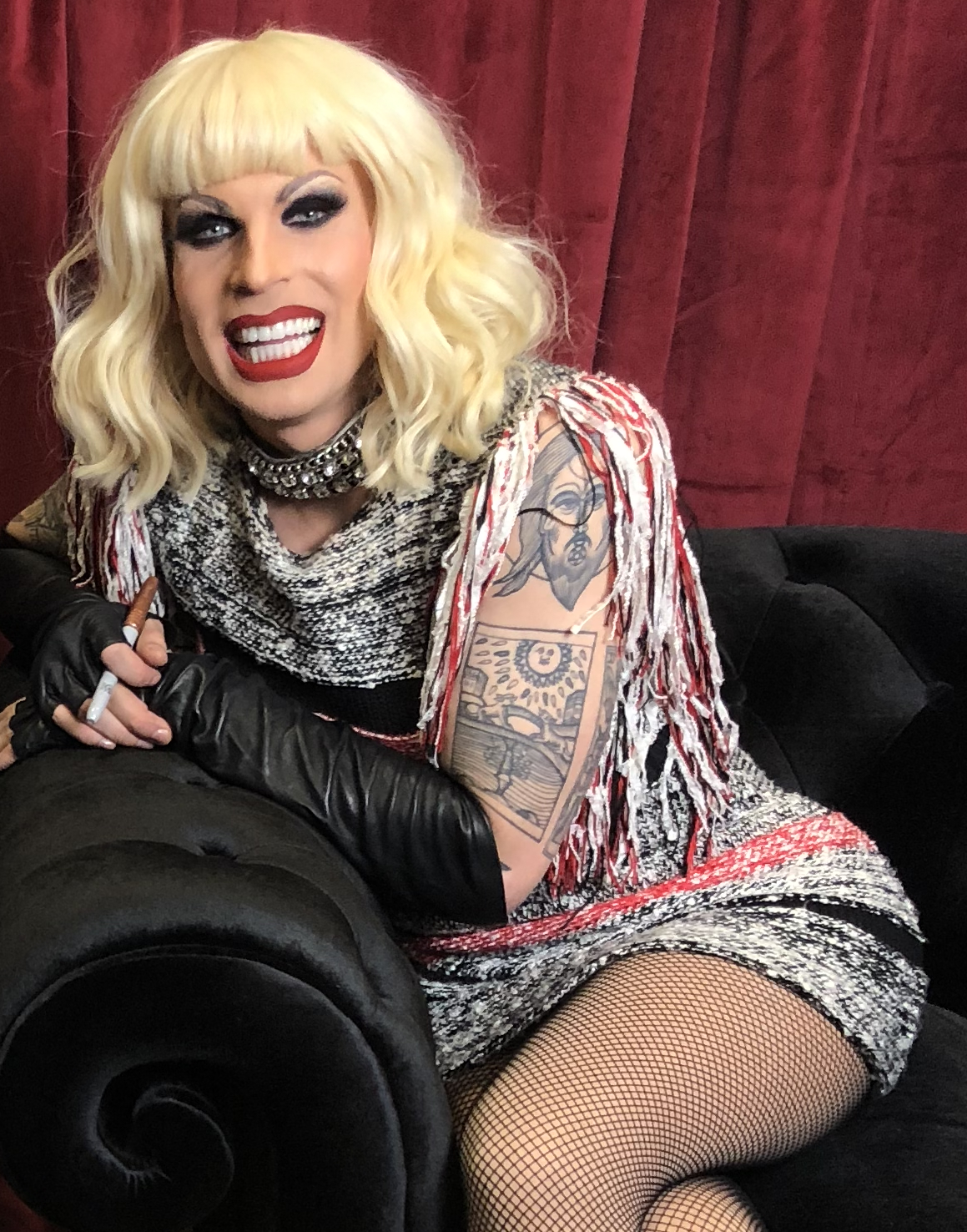
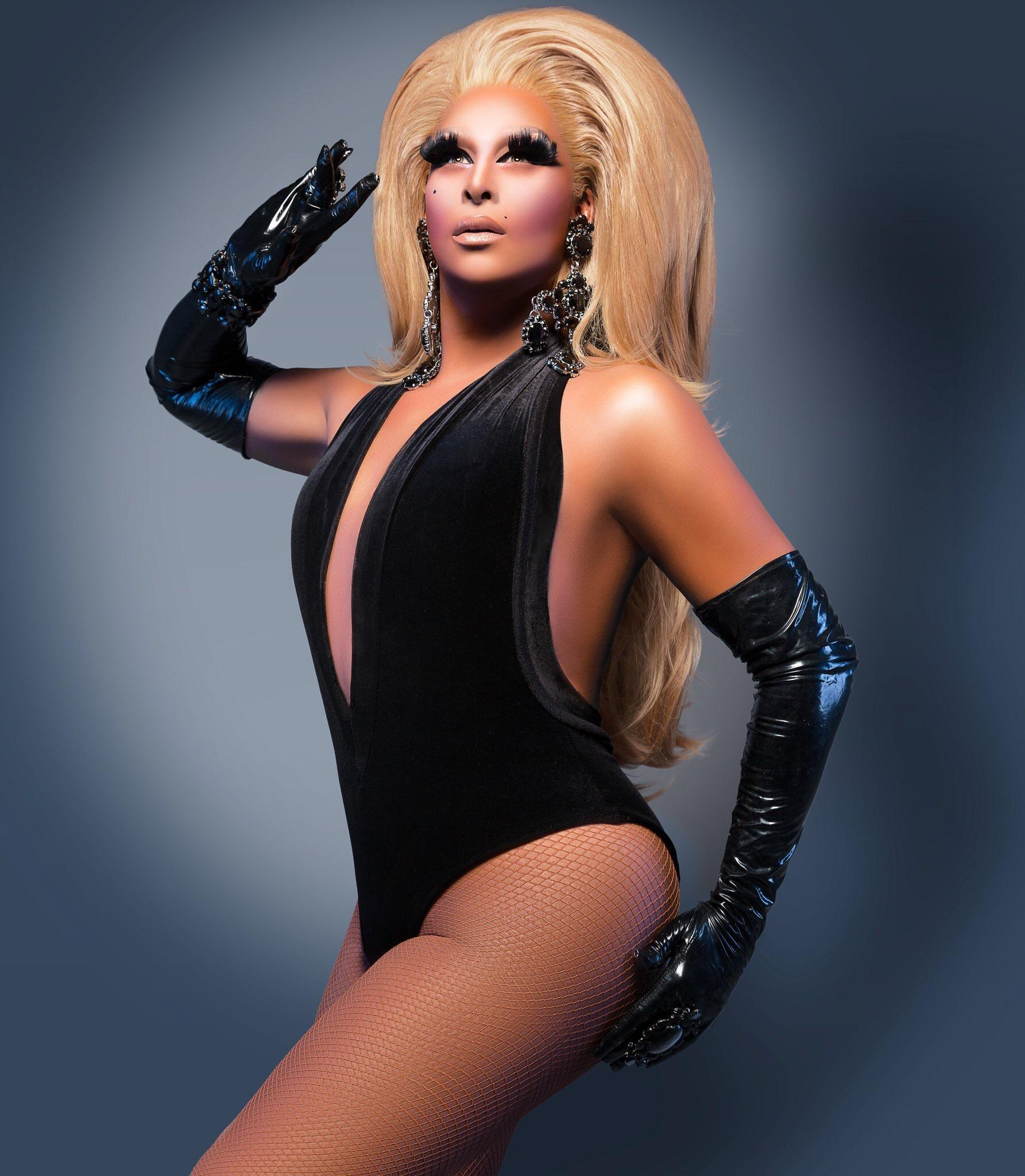
Clockwise: Alaska Thunderfuck, Detox, Roxxxy Andrews and Katya Zamolodchikova are featured artists on "Read U Wrote U".

"Read U Wrote U" was written by RuPaul and Ellis Miah, with Alaska Thunderfuck, Detox, Katya Zamolodchikova and Roxxxy Andrews writing and performing their own rap verses. As shown on the RuPaul's Drag Race All Stars episode "All Stars Supergroup", AB Soto recorded Alaska, Detox, Katya and Roxxxy's rap verses, with Travis Wall choreographing the song's performance. During an episode of the documentary series Portrait of a Queen, Detox recalled recording the track:

Nobody heard each other's lyrics, nobody heard each other's verses until the night before we went in to do rehearsal. [...] It wasn't even finished, but everyone on set was like, "This is going to be fucking epic," and it was.

— Detox, Portrait of a Queen

The song starts with a rap verse performed by Alaska Thunderfuck, where she references the Wizard of Oz (1939) film with the lyrics "I'm Dorothy, you're Toto, get in a basket". During Detox's verse, she spells out her name, rapping the line "D to the E to the T to the O to the… hold it! X!", which she highlights during the song's performance with a low buttock drop. The song continues with Katya Zamolodchikova rapping in a Russian accent, which she opens by mentioning her full drag name, Yekaterina Petrovna Zamolodchikova. Roxxxy Andrews references her performance in comedy challenges with the lyric, "Not like my comedy, I'm killing on this rhyme", before singing the latter half of her verse.

== Critical reception ==
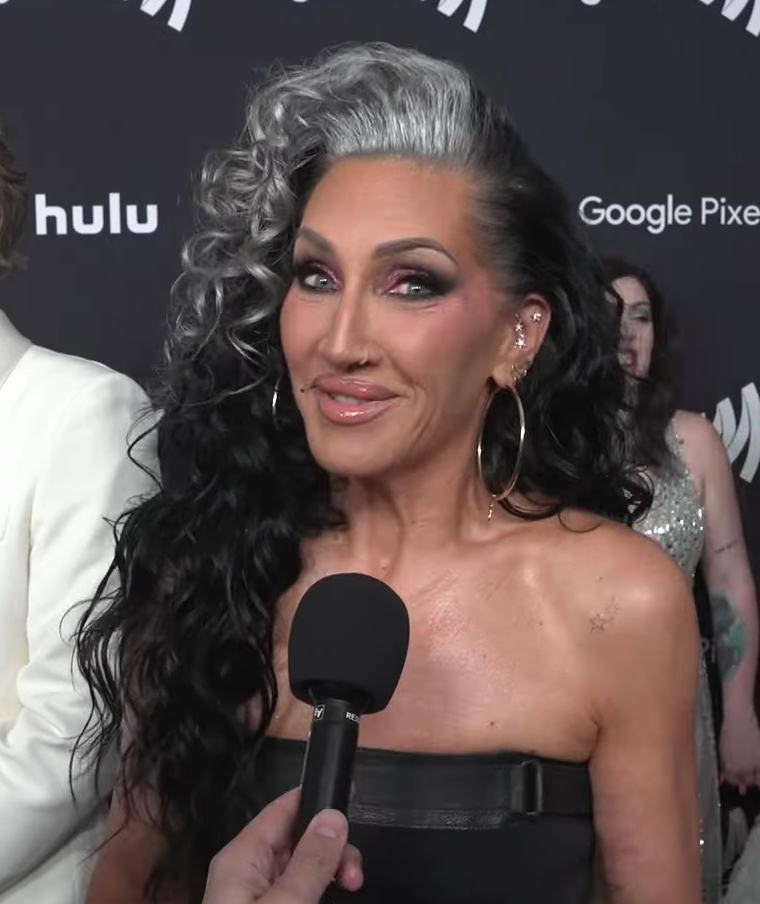
Michelle Visage (pictured) ranked "Read U Wrote U" as the sixth best Drag Race performance ever.

"Read U Wrote U" was met positively amongst critics. Tomás Mier and Brittany Spanos of Rolling Stone ranked it as the eighth best song made by drag queens, with Mier adding that no "RuMix" reimagination had come close to surpassing it, highlighting Katya Zamolodchikova's Russian accent verse. Writing for Billboard, Stephen Daw ranked it as the best RuPaul's Drag Race All Stars muslcal number, also calling it the "best song to come out of Drag Race", describing it as "pure chaos incarnate", while Joe Lynch named it one of the best songs from RuPaul's Drag Race queens, calling it an "instant gay bar classic", highlighting its references to Russian literature, Reddit and The Wizard of Oz (1939). In Amanda Mitchell's ranking of every Drag Race "RuMix" for Vulture, the song was placed second, with Mitchell calling it the "definition of how a decent hit can be made better in the right hands". In an interview with Glamour, Drag Race judge Michelle Visage ranked it as the sixth best Drag Race performance ever. On The Tab's Harrison Brocklehurst ranking of every RuPaul's Drag Race song with verses from the cast, "Read U Wrote U" was placed first, describing it as "an institution" within queer nightlife culture and comparing its cultural significance to Madonna's "Like a Prayer" (1989) and Britney Spears' "Toxic" (2003).

=== Roxxxy Andrews' verse ===
Among the four verses in "Read U Wrote U", Roxxxy Andrews' part drew divided responses. In a review of "All Stars Supergroup", Oliver Sava of The A.V. Club described her performance as "underwhelming as her rhymes", criticizing her singing as "rough" and writing that the verse "shows why she's been in the bottom more times than anyone else this season", referring to her performance throughout RuPaul's Drag Race All Stars. Detox said to Cosmopolitan about Roxxxy Andrews' verse:

We sat outside after recording cracking up. When Roxxxy's verse came on, we dragged the shit out of her because it was so ironic and silly. Immediately we knew it was going to be big.

— Detox, Cosmopolitan

In retrospective commentary about the song, Harrison Brocklehurst of The Tab noted that the verse had initially been "written off and laughed at", but argued that it had since become iconic. For Vulture, Amanda Mitchell similarly described the verse as "so bad it's good", noting that it had been extensively "memefied", highlighting her verse as the song's most notable lyrics. Stephen Daw for Billboard described Roxxxy Andrews' lyrics in "Read U Wrote U" as "unforgettable corny songwriting".

=== Listicles ===
Listicles
Critic/Publication	List	Rank	Ref.
Billboard	10 Best Musical Numbers In RuPaul's Drag Race All Stars Herstory	1	
Billboard	20 Best Songs From RuPaul's Drag Race Queens	Unranked	
Decider	RuPaul's Drag Race: Every Final Challenge Girl Group Performance, Ranked	2	
Glamour	7 Best Drag Race Performances Ever, According to Michelle Visage	6	
Screen Rant	RuPaul's Drag Race: The 10 Most Difficult Maxi Challenges	Unranked	
The Tab	Definitive Ranking of Every RuPaul's Drag Race Song with Verses from the Queens	1	
Rolling Stone	20 Best Songs by Drag Queens	8	
Vulture	Every Drag Race RuMix, Ranked	2	

== Legacy ==
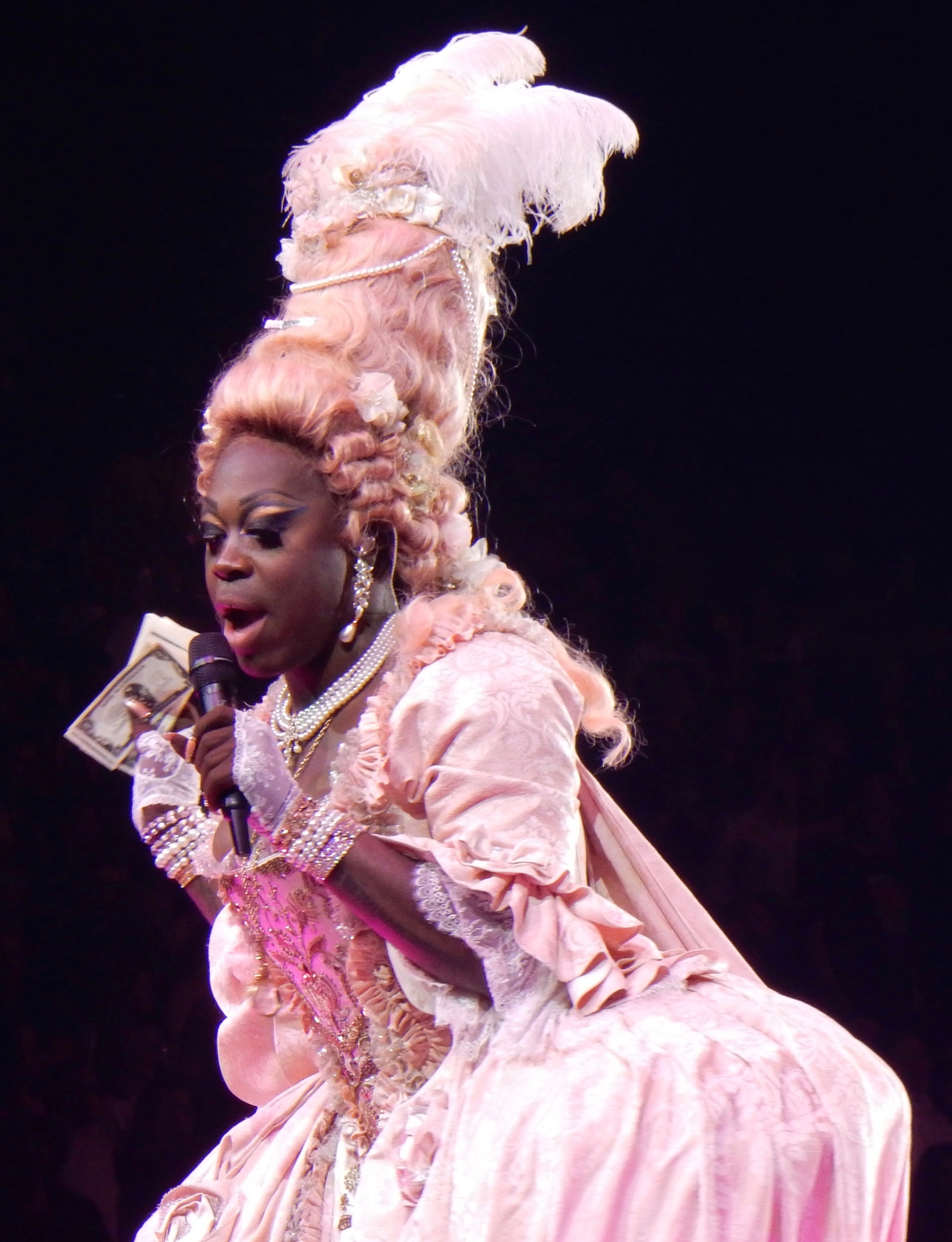
Bob the Drag Queen (pictured) has incorporated elements of "Read U Wrote U" into multiple songs, including "Corned Beef" (2024).

In a review of the RuPaul's Drag Race All Stars season 3 finale episode "A Jury of Their Queers", Tim Mulkerin of Mic praised "Read U Wrote U" as an "instantly iconic number", noting that fans and queens continued to reference it regularly, while describing the All Stars 3 contestants' performance of "Kitty Girl" as a "calculated, try-hard followup" to "Read U Wrote U", concluding that it failed to match the latter's cultural impact.

On May 3, 2020, a virtual performance of the song, subtitled as the "2020 Quarantine" edition, was released on YouTube as part of Digital DragCon, which was held following the cancellation of in-person events due to the COVID-19 pandemic. It featured the song's original lineup performing remotely, with different Animoji covering Detox's face following an invasive facial treatment. The RuPaul's Drag Race All Stars performance of "Read U Wrote U" has reached over 22 million views on YouTube.

Elements of the song have been incorporated multiple times in songs by the American drag performer Bob the Drag Queen. On the song "Yet Another Dig" (2017), Alaska Thunderfuck, as a featured artist, references Roxxxy Andrews' "Read U Wrote U" rap verse. The song's instrumental was later used on the diss track "Dear Ms. Banks" (2018), directed at the American rapper Azealia Banks.

The song's instrumental was again used in the diss tracks by Bob the Drag Queen and Maddy Morphosis during an online feud. Bob the Drag Queen released "Corned Beef" on February 4, 2024. The title referenced comments made by Maddy Morphosis on the Drag Race companion show The Pit Stop, in which she described Bob the Drag Queen's writing of new verses over pre-existing RuPaul's Drag Race songs as "corny". Bob the Drag Queen referred to Maddy Morphosis as a "straggot", referencing the original track with the lyrics, "Read U Wrote U, yeah you've been read / Fayetteville, Arkansas, giving inbred". In response, Maddy Morphosis released a diss track titled "Who Popped Ya?" on February 5, while referring to Bob the Drag Queen as a "has-been".

== Charts ==
Chart performance
Chart (2016)	Peak position
US Hot Dance/Electronic Songs (Billboard)	29
US Dance/Electronic Digital Songs (Billboard)	14

== Release history ==
Release dates and formats
Region	Date	Format	Label	Ref.
Various	October 12, 2016	Music download; streaming	World of Wonder	

== See also ==
- Drag Race discography
- Girl groups in the Drag Race franchise
