= Reading Is Fundamental (disambiguation) =

Reading Is Fundamental is a non-profit children's literacy organization based in the United States.

Reading Is Fundamental may also refer to:

- "Reading Is Fundamental" (The Real Housewives of Potomac), television episode
- "Reading Is Fundamental" (Supernatural), television episode
- "Reading Is Fundamental", a song from Doctor Strange (soundtrack)
- "Reading Is Fundamental", a song from the Drag Race franchise
