= Love Boutique =

Studio album by Keo Nozari
- Released: March 15, 2011
- Recorded: 2008–11
- Genres: Pop, dance, electropop
- Length: 39:44
- Label: KeSide Music
- Producers: Keo Nozari (also producer of all vocals), Ellis Miah

Keo Nozari chronology
Late Nite VIP (2005)	Love Boutique (2011)

Love Boutique is the second studio album by Billboard Top 20 charting American recording artist, DJ and producer Keo Nozari, released on March 15, 2011. The album was recorded between 2008 and 2011 both by Nozari himself and with Nozari's longtime collaborator Ellis Miah which Nozari documented on his namesake YouTube channel.

Upon release Love Boutique received rave reviews. Edge New York praised Nozari as "a clever lyricist and able to craft tunes that are memorable after just one listen" and called the album "a treasure trove of torso-twisting tunes." Towleroad.com singled out Nozari's DJ experience as informing the album's most original moments, "Look to (song) 'Acceptable 2 U' for a compelling rock/dance hybrid that stands to be the authentic counterpart to (Lady Gaga's) 'Born This Way'.". Rating it one of the Top 10 Entertainment Highlights of the Week on April 8, 2011, The Advocate called the album "stylishly playful" and gave especially high praise to album track "House of Mirrors" saying "it may be the fiercest antibullying anthem ever." And TheShowT.com credited the album for its "standout booty-bouncing tracks."

== Track listing ==
The track listing was confirmed by Nozari's official website. Credits adapted from album booklet.

No.	Title	Writer(s)	Producer(s)	Length
1.	"Love Boutique"	Keo Nozari	Keo Nozari, Ellis Miah	2:58
2.	"Spell"	Keo Nozari	Keo Nozari, Ellis Miah	3:50
3.	"Private Party"	Keo Nozari, Ellis Miah, C. Maddox Lake	Keo Nozari, Ellis Miah	3:38
4.	"Acceptable 2 U"	Keo Nozari	Keo Nozari, Ellis Miah	3:30
5.	"In The City"	Keo Nozari	Keo Nozari, Ellis Miah, Additional Production by Jon Kapps	3:36
6.	"Arm Charm"	Keo Nozari	Keo Nozari	3:36
7.	"Like Lightning"	Keo Nozari, Ellis Miah	Ellis Miah, Keo Nozari	3:26
8.	"Playing With Fire"	Keo Nozari, Ellis Miah	Keo Nozari, Ellis Miah	4:44
9.	"House of Mirrors"	Keo Nozari	Keo Nozari, Ellis Miah	3:19
10.	"Got To Be (Can't Deny the Feeling)"	Keo Nozari	Keo Nozari, Ellis Miah	3:33
11.	"Flow"	Keo Nozari	Keo Nozari	3:08
