= All Stars Supergroup =

- RuPaul's Drag Race All Stars episode
- Episode no.: Season 2 Episode 8
- Presented by: RuPaul
- Original air date: October 13, 2016

Episode chronology
← Previous "Family That Drags Together"	Next → "Reunited"
- RuPaul's Drag Race All Stars season 2

"All Stars Supergroup" is the eighth episode of the second season of the American television series RuPaul's Drag Race All Stars. It originally aired on October 13, 2016. The episode's main challenge tasks the final four contestants—Alaska, Detox, Katya, and Roxxxy Andrews—with writing, recording, and performing original verses to RuPaul's song "Read U Wrote U". Travis Wall is a guest choreographer. The contestants also record interviews for the podcast RuPaul: What's the Tee? After winning a three-way lip-sync to "If I Were Your Woman" by Gladys Knight & the Pips, Alaska wins the competition and Detox and Katya are runners-up.

== Episode ==
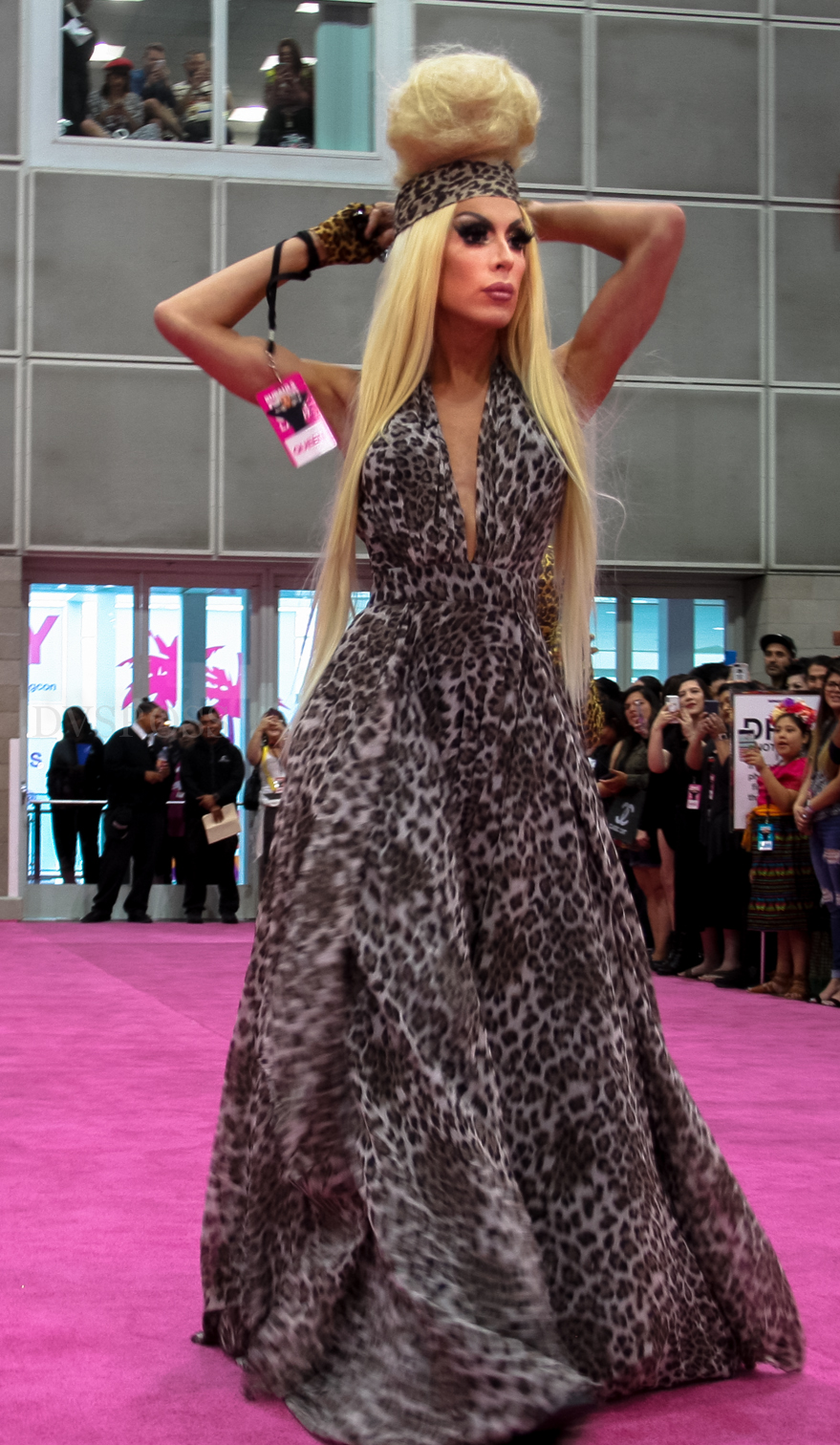
Alaska Thunderfuck (pictured in 2019) wins the competition.

The top four finalists—Alaska, Detox, Katya, and Roxxxy Andrews—return to the workroom after Detox eliminated Alyssa Edwards on the previous episode. Katya reveals that she would have eliminated Roxxxy Andrews from the competition, had she won the lip-sync contest. On a new day, Michelle Visage greets the group reveals the final challenge, which tasks the contestants with writing, recording, and performing original verses to RuPaul's song "Read U Wrote U". Visage reveals that the contestants will record with AB Soto, record interviews for the podcast RuPaul: What's the Tee?, and rehearse choreography with Travis Wall.

The contestants each record with AB Soto and meet with RuPaul and Visage to record interviews. In the workroom, Alaska worries about being associated with Detox and Roxxxy Andrews as the clique "RoLaskaTox" (from the fifth season of RuPaul's Drag Race). On the main stage, the contestants rehearse with Wall and other dancers.

On elimination day, the contestants make final preparations in the workroom for the fashion show. Alaska apologizes for her attitude. On the main stage, RuPaul welcomes fellow judges Visage, Carson Kressley, Ross Mathews, and Todrick Hall. RuPaul shares the assignment of the main challenge, then the contestants perform "Read U Wrote U". RuPaul announces the runway category ("All Star Glam-o-Rama"), then the fashion show commences. After the contestants present their looks, the judges deliver their final critiques. RuPaul asks the contestants to say why they should be declared the winner and not their competitors. The judges excuse the contestants from the stage and deliberate. Roxxxy Andrews is eliminated, leaving Alaska, Detox, and Katya as the top three contestants of the season. The finalists lip-sync to "If I Were Your Woman" (1970) by Gladys Knight & the Pips. Alaska wins the competition.

== Production and broadcast ==
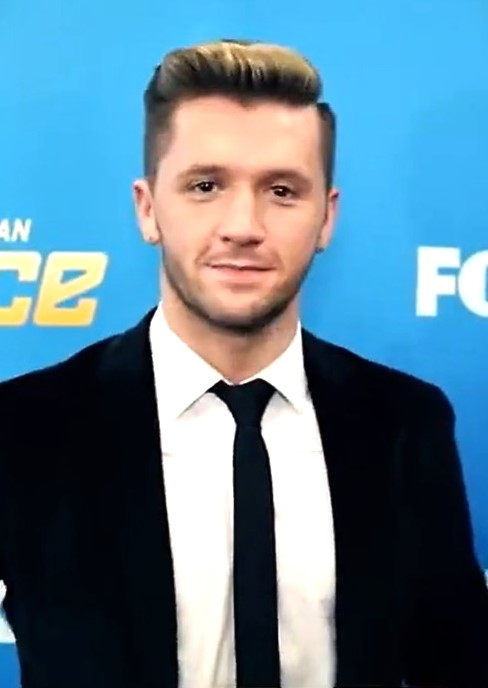
Travis Wall is a guest choreographer.

The episode originally aired on October 13, 2016.

The contestants revisited the song in 2020, during the COVID-19 pandemic.

=== Fashion ===
For the main stage, RuPaul wears a yellow dress and a blonde wig. For "Read U Wrote U", Alaska wears a black outfit, tall black boots, and a long dark wig. Her skin is painted blue. Detox has a short black shirt, large hoops earrings, and two long ponytails. Katya wears a black outfit with matching boots and a long blonde wig. Roxxxy Andrews has a bodysuit and a long brown wig. For the fashion show, Alaska wears a gown, a boa, and a long blonde wig. Detox has a dress with netting, a headpiece, and a short blonde wig. Katya has a black-and-gold dress and a curly blonde wig. Roxxxy Andrews has a backless dress and a short wig.

== Reception ==
Writing for Vulture, Joel Kim Booster rated the episode four out of five stars. Gay Times called Roxxxy Andrews's verse "groundbreaking and revolutionary", and said the contestants' performance was "legendary". Ryan Shea of Instinct called the song "iconic" in 2019. Screen Rant included "All Stars Supergroup" in a 2022 overview of the ten best episodes of All Stars, according to IMDb. The website said "the verses [the contestants] wrote were nothing short of fabulous and even spawned hilarious memes". "Read U Wrote U" was also the first song from Drag Race to chart on a Billboard music chart, peaking at #29 on the Dance/Electronic Songs chart and #14 on the Dance/Electronic Digital Songs Sales chart. The "Read U Wrote U" performance was among Visage's seven favorite on Drag Race in 2022.

== See also ==
- Drag Race discography
