= Late Nite VIP =

Studio album by Keo Nozari
- Released: October 18, 2005
- Recorded: 2003–05
- Genre: Pop, dance, electropop
- Label: KeSide Music
- Producer: Keo Nozari, Ellis Miah

Keo Nozari chronology
Late Nite VIP (2005)	Love Boutique (2011)

Late Nite VIP is the debut studio album by Billboard Top 20 charting American recording artist, DJ and producer Keo Nozari.

Years of live performances in the early 2000s — including solo shows in New York City at former CBGBs and the Virgin Megastore — culminated in Nozari releasing his debut album Late Nite VIP on October 18, 2005. The album of his original material received both critical acclaim and commercial success. Billboard Magazine (in a review for the December 10, 2005 issue, pages 49–50) compared Nozari's singing style to "a young George Michael", and cited Late Nite VIP’s “electro-funk-fueled pop sound” as being on par with the work of writer-producer Stuart Price (Madonna’s Confessions on a Dancefloor) and Janet Jackson’s longtime collaborators, Jimmy Jam and Terry Lewis from his hometown of Minneapolis. Keo co-produced the album with Ellis Miah, whose production credits include Miley Cyrus with some of the original tracks mixed by Jody den Broeder.

The first single off Late Nite VIP, "Close Enough" was licensed to Armin Van Buuren's Armada Music / Coldharbour Recordings.

Second single "Question of Monogamy" featured a racy video—which included the openly gay Nozari in a steamy shower with two other men—causing a controversy at MTV's LOGO channel. But it went on to be a Number One video on the channel and named the network's "Ultimate Sexiest Video."

The third single was Nozari's biggest commercial and chart success to date. "Rewind" landed on the Billboard Dance Club Play Chart, hitting the Top 20 in October 2008, peaking at Number 18 (Billboard Magazine issue Vol. 120, Issue 40 on Oct 4, 2008). The song featured remixes by Jody den Broeder, The Wideboys and Nozari himself.

== Track listing ==
The track listing was confirmed by Nozari's official website. Credits adapted from album booklet.

No.	Title	Writer(s)	Producer(s)	Length
1.	"Intro: Late Nite Invite"	Keo Nozari	Keo Nozari	1:40
2.	"Yes"	Keo Nozari, Curtis Richardson	Keo Nozari	3:32
3.	"Attitude"	Keo Nozari, Ellis Miah	Ellis Miah	3:26
4.	"Close Enough"	Keo Nozari, Ellis Miah	Keo Nozari, Ellis Miah	3:54
5.	"Question of Monogamy"	Keo Nozari	Keo Nozari	4:20
6.	"SuperFluidity"	Keo Nozari	Keo Nozari	3:33
7.	"Late Nite Lounge: WVIP"	Keo Nozari, Ellis Miah	Ellis Miah, Keo Nozari	0:30
8.	"Go Out"	Keo Nozari, Ellis Miah	Ellis Miah	3:43
9.	"Rewind"	Keo Nozari, Ellis Miah	Ellis Miah	3:35
10.	"Late Nite VIP"	Keo Nozari	Keo Nozari	4:08
11.	"Various States of Undress"	Keo Nozari	Keo Nozari	5:28
12.	"FireFly"	Keo Nozari	Keo Nozari	4:27
13.	"DayBreak"	Keo Nozari	Keo Nozari	3:35
14.	"Early Morning Bossa Nova"	Keo Nozari	Keo Nozari	4:54
