= Mila Jam =

American singer

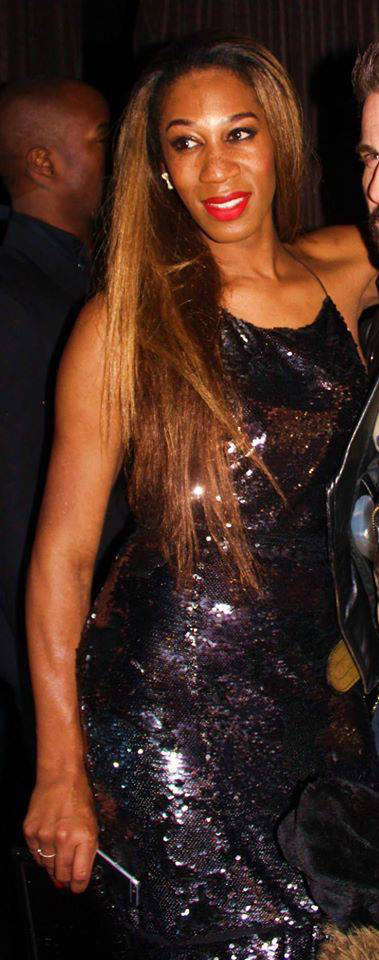

Background information
- Born: February 22, 1989 (age 37); Aurora, Illinois, U.S.

Jahmila Adderley, known professionally as Mila Jam, is an American transgender singer, songwriter, dancer, actress, and LGBTQ activist.

== Early life and education ==
Jam was born in the Chicago suburb of Aurora, Illinois on February 22, 1989. She was raised in Columbus, Georgia, by her mother, Stephanie Adderley, an IT technician, and Phillip Adderley, a lab technician at Thomas Jefferson National Accelerator Facility. She attended Columbus High School. Before continuing her career in New York City at the American Musical and Dramatic Academy, she performed in several national stage productions and television commercials.

== Career ==
=== YouTube, stage, and television ===
Mila Jam performed as the popular YouTube impersonator Britney Houston. She was known for creating parodies of popular videos and posting them on YouTube within days of the original videos' releases. She began creating her parodies while in the national touring company of Rent.

Several of her parodies have over a million hits, with her parody of Rihanna's song "Umbrella" having over two million. For her parody of the Pussycat Dolls' song "When I Grow Up", Jam recruited four drag queens to serve as the "Britney Cat Dolls". She choreographed and starred in the 2008 MTV original television pilot Newsical, which was not picked up.

Jam has appeared on BBC Three's Lily Allen and Friends, where she performed "Bleeding Love" with Mark Ronson, on MTV, and MTV News. She has also hosted episodes of the YouTube talk show I’m From Driftwood.

=== Music ===
Jam recorded the song "And the Crowd Goes", which was written and produced by Jonny McGovern and released on his compilation, The East Village Mixtape 2: The Legends Ball. The song also features New York rapper Jipsta. Jam has performed alongside James Brown, Mark Ronson, Laverne Cox, Travis Wall, Jody Watley, Lady Kier of Deee-Lite, and Natasha Bedingfield.

The music video for Jam's song "Faces" was released to coincide with International Transgender Day of Visibility and featured appearances by Laverne Cox, Tituss Burgess, Candis Cayne, Geena Rocero, Peppermint, Zackary Drucker, Trace Lysette, and Nathan Lee Graham. The song has been called an anthem for the LGBTQ movement and focuses on self-acceptance, inner beauty, and sense of belonging. Jam described the song as being "about looking in that mirror and hearing, 'Do I belong, am I enough, will someone love me for who I really am?' We wear smiles all the time but hide in fear and loathing because we feel different. The journey is universal no matter who you are."

== Awards ==
Mila was awarded Best Video and Dance Artist at the 2013 GLAM Nightlife Awards and she was named Odyssey Nightlife Awards Breakthrough Artist in 2015 .

== Discography ==
=== EPs ===
- Bruised (2018)
- Pretty One (2021)
- A Mila Jam Christmas (2022)

=== Singles ===
- "Walk" (2010)
- "This is Love" (2011)
- "Warrior" (2011)
- "Masters of the Universe" (2013)
- "Faces" (2017)
- "Cheesecake" (2018)
- "Like the Last Time" (2019)
- "Twilight Zone" (2019)
- "Masquerade (2019)
- "Eye on You" (2019)
- "Call It Love" (2019)
- "Number One" (2020)
- "Timewaster" (Evangeline Wong and Mila Jam, 2021)
- "Too High" (2021)
- "Just Sayin'" (2021)
- "It's Raining Them" (2021)
- "The Holidays Are Cancelled" (2021)
- "Catch This Love" (2022)
- "Over & Over" (2022)
- "God & Guns" (2022)
- "Be My Heartbreak" (2022)
- "DMTA" (2022)
- "Popstar" (2022)
- "SXGME" (2022)
- "Magic" (2023)
- "Inside/Somebody" (2023)
- "Fierce" (Ultra Naté, Angelica Ross, and Mila Jam feat. A2, 2023)
- "Pretty One Rock" (2023)
- "Say Your Name" (2023)
- "LMNTL" (2023)
- "Running Up That Hill" (2023)

=== Singles as featured artist ===
- "Better Days" (Kayu feat. Mila Jam, 2018)
- "Summer Sex Magic (Hot NYC Mix)" (Keo Nozari feat. Mila Jam, 2022)
