= Keo Nozari =

American singer-songwriter

Background information
- Genres: Pop, electronic dance, pop rock
- Occupations: musician, singer-songwriter, record producer, DJ, actor, writer
- Instruments: Vocals, keyboards
- Years active: 2000–present
- Labels: KeSide Music, Armada Music, Centaur Music
- Website: thekeo.com

Keo Nozari is an American pop singer-songwriter, music producer, DJ, screen actor, and writer.

== Career ==
=== 2005–2013: Music and Billboard chart success ===
Years of live performances in the early 2000s—including solo shows in New York City at former CBGBs and the Virgin Megastore—culminated in Nozari releasing his debut album Late Nite VIP on October 18, 2005. The album of his original material received both critical acclaim and commercial success. Billboard Magazine (in a review for the December 10, 2005 issue, pages 49–50) compared Nozari's singing style to "a young George Michael", and cited Late Nite VIP's "electro-funk-fueled pop sound" as being on par with the work of writer-producer Stuart Price (Madonna's Confessions on a Dancefloor) and Janet Jackson's longtime collaborators, Jimmy Jam and Terry Lewis from his hometown of Minneapolis. Keo co-produced the album with Ellis Miah, whose production credits include Miley Cyrus with some of the original tracks mixed by Jody den Broeder.

The first single off Late Nite VIP, "Close Enough" was licensed to Armin Van Buuren's Armada Music / Coldharbour Recordings.

Second single "Question of Monogamy" featured a racy video—which included the openly gay Nozari in a steamy shower with two other men—causing a controversy at MTV's LOGO channel, but it went on to be a number one video on the channel and named the network's "Ultimate Sexiest Video".

The third single was a big commercial and chart success for Nozari. "Rewind" landed on the Billboard Dance Club Play Chart, hitting the Top 20 in October 2008, peaking at Number 18 (Billboard Magazine issue Vol. 120, Issue 40 on October 4, 2008). The song featured remixes by Jody den Broeder, The Wideboys and Nozari himself.

As a DJ, Nozari became well-established in New York City. Known for his upbeat pop-dance style, his many residencies included Fire Island Pines, Splash, Club 57 and Rockit and he's DJ'd many private parties for celebrities like Vanessa Williams.

In 2010, Nozari announced work on the final stages of a brand new album Love Boutique, which he documented on his namesake YouTube channel. The album was released on March 15, 2011 and received positive reviews.

In 2012, Nozari released the holiday single “Christmas Came Early” accompanied by a campy music video where he sang naked in a bathtub filled with Christmas bulbs. The song was covered in 2016 by Broadway star Daniel Reichard (who originated the role of songwriter Bob Gaudio in Jersey Boys on Broadway) in his holiday show at New York City jazz club Birdland.

Nozari also composed for television. In 2013, he wrote and produced an ABC Nightline Primetime Theme song with then music partner Ellis Miah.

=== 2019–present: Headspace and Fingerprints albums ===
After focusing on DJing, Nozari returned in 2019 with his third studio album Headspace. Called a "digital experience", Nozari described the project: “Most pop songs talk about our relationships with others. But I wanted to dive into the relationship I have with myself... I wanted to create a point of optimism, a point of empowerment with this music for myself and for others in these very dark times. As a gay man and son of an Iranian immigrant, it's been challenging enough for me to stay in a positive place in the current climate, and I know for many people it's far, far worse... So, I sort of think of Headspace as a series of sign posts, that can hopefully help point the way to a better place inside us all."

Billboard praised Nozari for "exploring inspiring messages with the LGBTQ community in mind" and cited single "Belong" as "a dreamy slice of positivity". In July 2020, single "Wildside" hit the Top 100 in the UK on Apple/ iTunes charts on the Alternative Song Chart, peaking at number 63. This was also the first album Nozari served as sole producer, writer, singer and mixer. The album was mastered by multi-Grammy winner Randy Merrill best known for his work with international pop artists including Harry Styles, Lady Gaga and Ariana Grande. Nozari also directed and starred in three music videos for the project "Wildside", "Lines", and "Belong".

Fingerprints, Nozari's fourth studio album, was released on July 22, 2022. Nozari described the album's inspiration: "A fingerprint is something left behind; something present now, remaining from the past; and also something unique to you." For him this meant exploring the impressions people had left on him; music from the past that inspired him (“showing my love of '70s disco and funk, '80s synth pop, and '90s R&B") and his intention to leave listeners with a lasting musical impression on them. "And hopefully through listening to this album — something I created unique to me — I'll, in turn, leave something behind that will touch and inspire. My fingerprint on you."

Contributors on the Fingerprints album included musicians from the show Hamilton on Broadway; Peppermint (of RuPaul's Drag Race) on the song "Treat Yourself"; and performer Mila Jam on "Summer Sex Magic". A music video directed by Nozari for "Summer Sex Magic" received praise in an editorial by World of Wonder in their WOW Report first describing the song as "a little disco confection... perfect for enjoying a taste of summer, a taste of sex, or a taste of magic (preferably all three)" and noted the video's many 1970s disco Easter eggs and references including Sonny & Cher, Barbra Streisand and Donna Summer's "No More Tears (Enough Is Enough)" single cover, Farrah Fawcett's iconic swimsuit poster, Burt Reynolds' Cosmopolitan magazine centerfold, The Bee Gees, Sister Sledge, ABBA, and "a slew of other iconic queer moments and performers from the period".

== Acting in TV and film ==
Nozari parlayed his experience as a performer in his music videos and as a professional DJ into roles in TV and film. In addition to cameos in Broad City, Comedy Central's All-Star Non-Denominational Christmas Special, White Collar, and the 2015 Tina Fey / Amy Poehler film Sisters, he also starred in an episode of the CBS show The Good Wife as Christine Baranski's client "Mike Taylor". Additionally, he had a small part in the 2010 movie Sex and the City 2.

== Writing and editing ==
A frequent contributor to many magazines and publications, Nozari served as Editor-at-Large and then as Music Editor for New York City's Next Magazine, writing a weekly popular music column. He currently contributes to The Huffington Post.

== Discography ==
=== Studio albums ===
- Late Nite VIP (2005)
- Love Boutique (2011)
- Headspace (2019)
- Fingerprints (2022)

=== Live albums ===
- VIP Acoustic (2009)

=== Singles ===
- "Close Enough" (2006)
- "Question of Monogamy" (2006)
- "Rewind" (2008)
- "Like Lightning" (2009)
- "House of Mirrors" (2010)
- "Acceptable 2 U" (2011)
- "In the City" (2011)
- "Christmas Came Early" (2012)
- "Where Time Stands Still" (2015)
- "Filter Control" (2015)
- "Why Temptation" (2015)
- "Lines" (2018)
- "Wildside" (Country Club Martini Crew Remixes) (2019)
- "Belong" (2020)
- "Falling Into Place" (2021)
- "Blindfolded & Barefoot" (2021)
- "Tip of My Tongue" (2021)
- "Summer Sex Magic" (2021)
- "Coming Closer to Me" (2022)
