= Family That Drags Together =

Television episode

- RuPaul's Drag Race All Stars episode
- Episode no.: Season 2 Episode 7
- Presented by: RuPaul
- Original air date: October 6, 2016

Guest appearances
- Aubrey Plaza (guest judge); Anastasia Soare

Episode chronology
← Previous "Drag Fish Tank"	Next → "All Stars Supergroup"
- RuPaul's Drag Race All Stars season 2

"Family That Drags Together" is the seventh episode of the second season of the American television series RuPaul's Drag Race All Stars. It originally aired on October 6, 2016. The episode's main challenge tasks the contestants with giving makeovers to family members. Aubrey Plaza is a guest judge. Anastasia Soare also makes a guest appearance to present an eyebrows tutorial. Alyssa Edwards is eliminated from the competition by Detox, who places in the top of the main challenge and wins a lip-sync contest against Katya to "Step It Up" by RuPaul.

== Episode ==
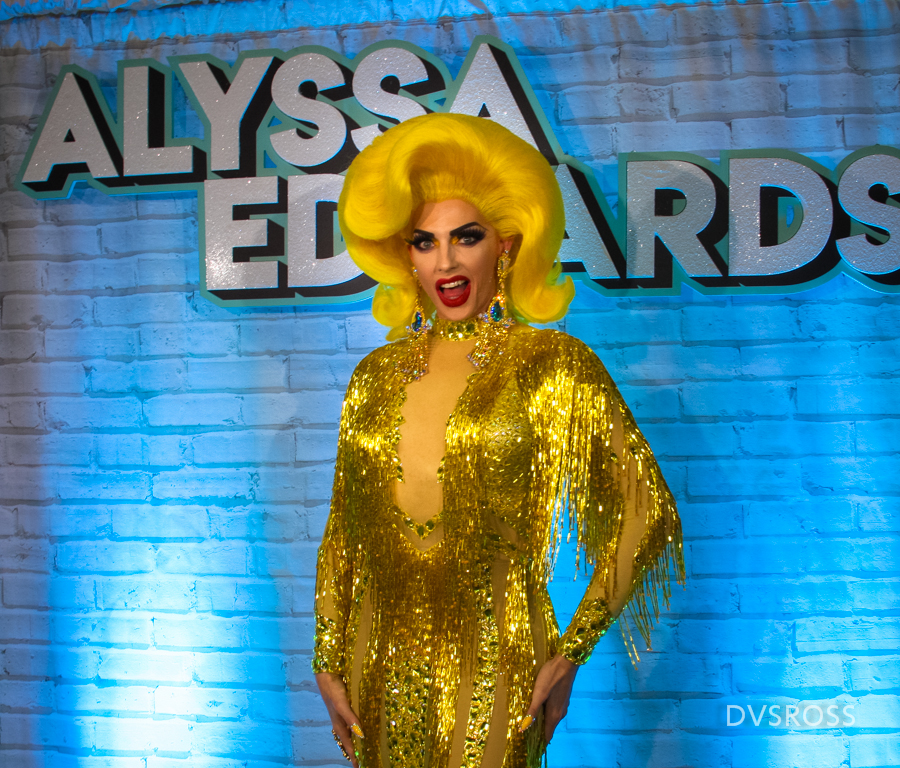
Alyssa Edwards (pictured in 2018) is eliminated from the competition.

The top five contestants return to the workroom after Alaska eliminated Tatianna from the competition on the previous episode. Katya reveals that she would have eliminated Roxxxy Andrews from the competition, had she won the lip-sync contest. On a new day, RuPaul greets the group and invites some guests to the workroom. Alyssa Edwards's sister Tabatha, Alaska's mother Pamela, Detox's sister Heather, Katya's mother Pat, Roxxxy Andrews's grandmother Sonia enter. RuPaul reveals the main challenge, which tasks the contestants with giving makeovers to family members.

The contestants and family members catch up and start to prepare for the fashion show. Alyssa Edwards and Tabatha are emotional, reuniting on the first anniversary of their mother's death. RuPaul returns to the workroom to meet with the contestants individually, asking questions and offering advice. Before leaving, RuPaul reveals to the pairs that they will be voguing on the main stage. The pairs get an eyebrow tutorial from Anastasia Soare of Anastasia Beverly Hills.

On elimination day, the pairs make final preparations in the workroom for the fashion show. On the main stage, RuPaul welcomes fellow judges Michelle Visage, Carson Kressley, and Todrick Hall, as well as guest judge Aubrey Plaza. RuPaul shares the assignment of the main challenge, then the fashion show commences. After the pairs perform voguing and present their outfits, the judges deliver their critiques. Detox and Katya are announced as the top two contestants. Alaska, Alyssa Edwards, and Roxxxy Andrews are announced as the bottom three contestants. While the contestants deliberate off stage, Alaska has an outburst. Detox and Katya face off in a lip-sync contest to "Step It Up" by RuPaul. Detox wins the lip-sync and decides to eliminate Alyssa Edwards from the competition. Alyssa Edwards returns to the workroom to write a message on the mirror for the remaining contestants. She reunites with her sister and signs off.

== Production and broadcast ==
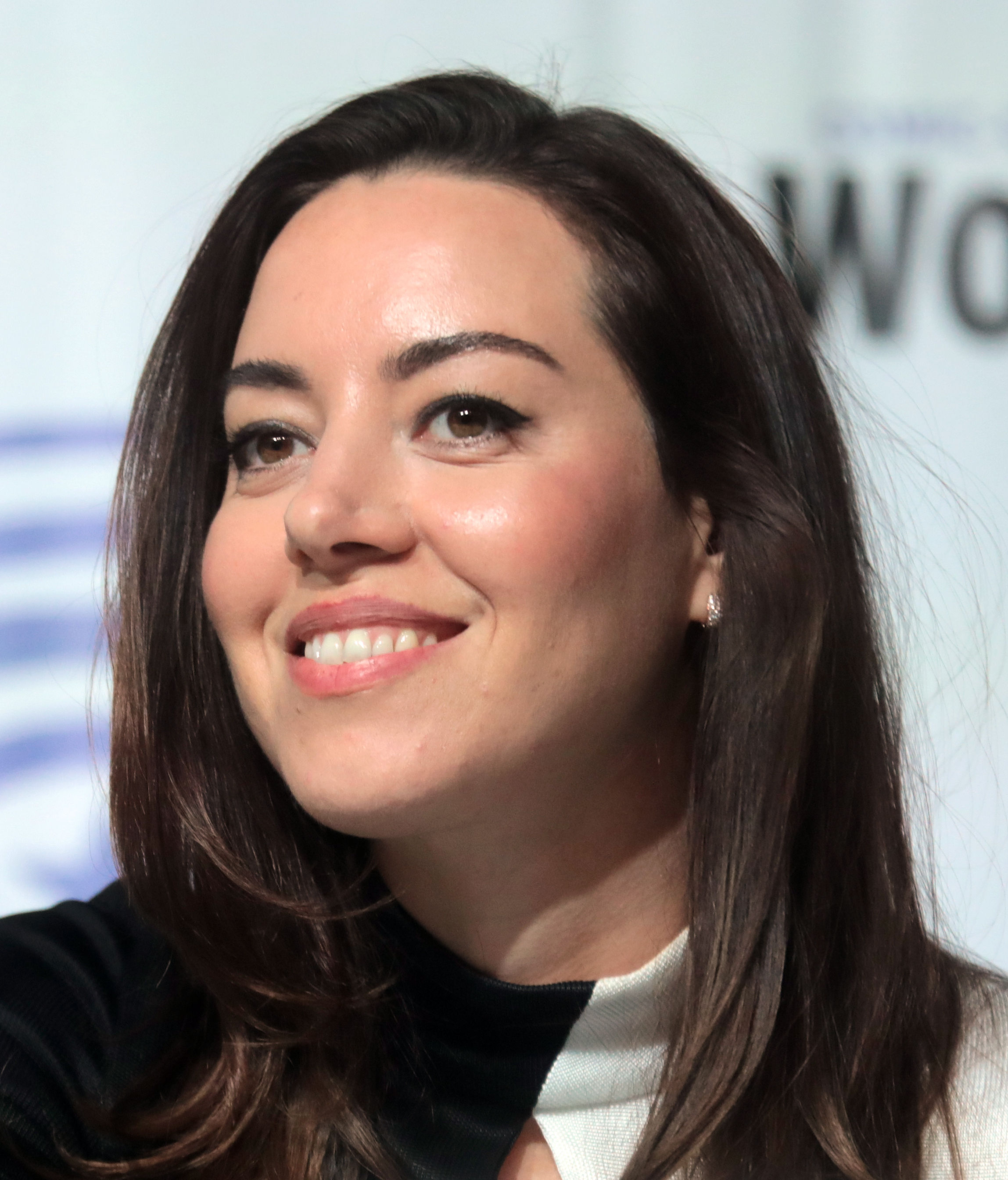
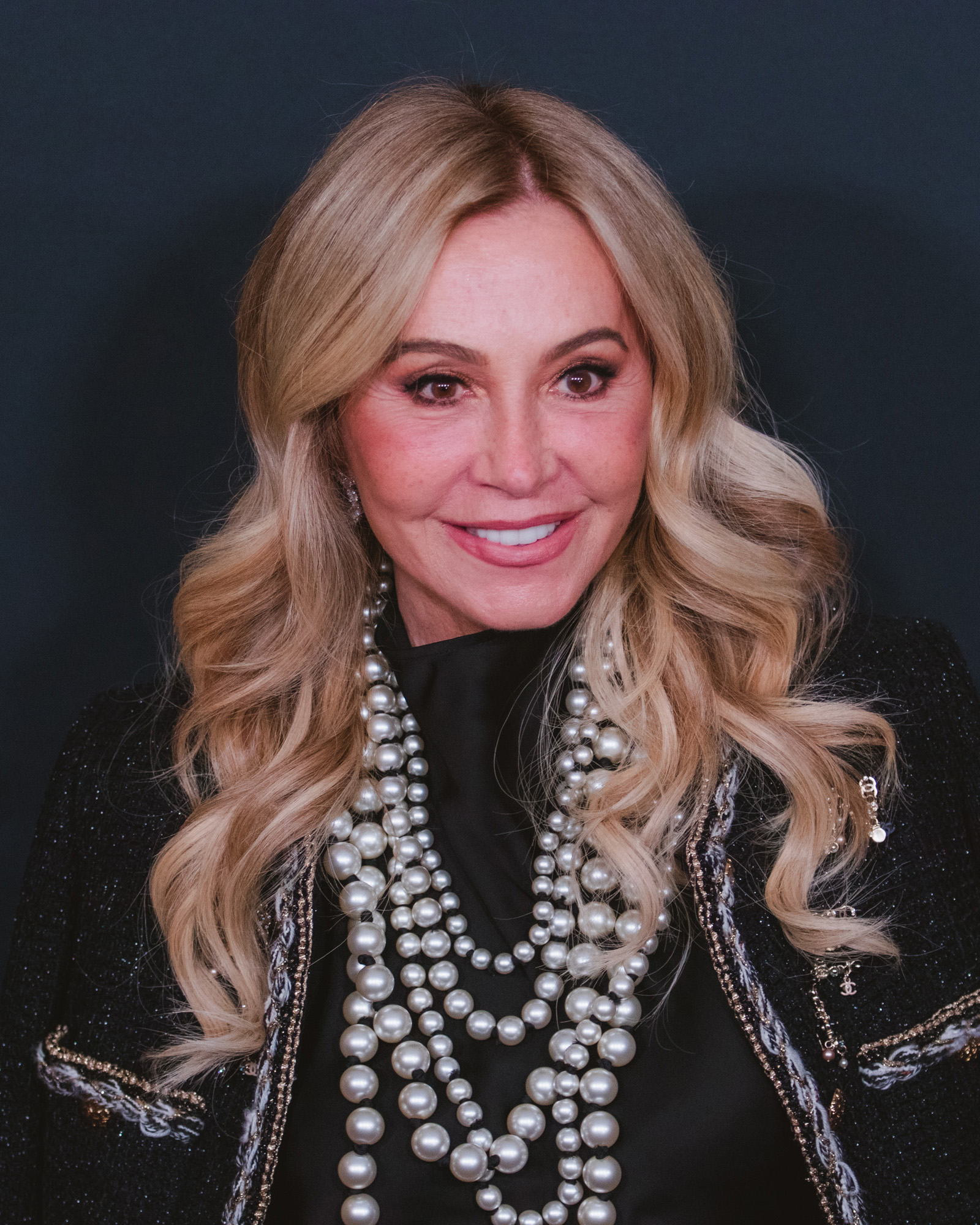
Aubrey Plaza (top) is a guest judge; Anastasia Soare (bottom) also makes a guest appearance.

The episode originally aired on October 6, 2016.

Alyssa Edwards has said that sharing the experience with Tabatha was her favorite moment on the show. Alyssa Edwards has said, "That was a love letter to my mother."

=== Fashion ===
For the fashion show, Alyssa Edwards and Ava Edwards have black-and-red outfits and blonde wigs. Alaska and Hawaii have black-and-white outfits and blonde wigs. The two unfurl a black flag with the white text "Hieeeee". Detox and D-rama have colorful outfits, fascinators, and long blonde wigs. Katya has a knitted outfit with a blonde wig. Her partner Svetlana Borisnova has a long white dress with colorful stitching, a blonde wig, and a Sickle. Roxxxy Andrews and her partner wear outfits with animal prints.

== Reception ==
Oliver Sava of The A.V. Club gave the episode a rating of 'B+'. Writing for Vulture, Joel Kim Booster rated the episode four out of five stars. Sam Brooks ranked the "Step It Up" performance number 53 in The Spinoff's 2019 "definitive ranking" of 162 Drag Race lip-syncs to date. Bernardo Sim included Alyssa Edwards's makeover challenge in Screen Rant's 2019 list of the ten "saddest moments" Drag Race history. Jessica Jalali included Katya and Svetlana Borisnova in the website's 2021 list of the ten best Drag Race makeover challenge "transformations". Jalali wrote: "Using Katya's Russian character as inspiration, Katya made them and their partner look straight out of the '70s Soviet Union. Katya's groovy bowl cut mixed with the design of their dress along with Katya's mom's babooshka look was an insanely smart take on a RuPaul's Drag Race makeover. Both created distinct characters with their makeovers, which helped Katya land in the top 2 and make it all the way to the finale." Sim included the duo in Pride.com's 2024 list of the ten best makeover challenge contestants in Drag Race history. He also included Katya saying "Party!" in Out magazine's 2025 list of the 32 "best and most hilarious memes" in Drag Race history.
