= Drag Race discography =

Various albums, singles, and other songs have been affiliated with the Drag Race franchise.

== American franchise ==
=== RuPaul's Drag Race ===
Albums

Title	Details
RuPaul Presents the CoverGurlz	Artist: RuPaul; Release date: January 28, 2014; Label: World of Wonder Productions, Inc.; Formats: Digital download, streaming
RuPaul Presents CoverGurlz 2	Artist: RuPaul; Release date: February 3, 2015; Label: World of Wonder; Formats: Digital download, streaming
RuPaul's Drag Race: The Rusical	Artist: Lucian Piane; Release date: April 22, 2016; Label: World of Wonder
Moulin Ru! the Rusical!	Artist: The Cast of RuPaul's Drag Race, season 14 (Note: Angeria Paris VanMichaels, Bosco, Daya Betty, DeJa Skye, Jorgeous, Lady Camden, and Willow Pill); Release Date: March 26, 2022; World of Wonder
Wigloose: The Rusical!	Artist: The Cast of RuPaul's Drag Race, season 15 (Note: Anetra, Loosey LaDuca, Luxx Noir London, Mistress Isabelle Brooks, Salina EsTitties, and Sasha Colby); Release date: March 18, 2023; Label: World of Wonder; Formats: Streaming, digital download
The Sound of Rusic	Artist: The Cast of RuPaul's Drag Race, season 16 (Note: Dawn, Megami, Mhi'ya Iman Le'Paige, Morphine Love Dion, Nymphia Wind, Plane Jane, Plasma, Q, Sapphira Cristál, and Xunami Muse); Release date: February 17, 2024; Label: World of Wonder; Formats: Streaming, digital download
The Wicked Wiz of Oz: The Rusical!	Artist: The Cast of RuPaul's Drag Race, season 17 (Note: Acacia Forgot, Arrietty, Jewels Sparkles, Kori King, Lana Ja'Rae, Lexi Love, Lydia B Kollins, Onya Nurve, Sam Star, and Suzie Toot); Release date: February 22, 2025; Label: World of Wonder; Formats: Streaming, digital download, LP

Extended plays

Title	Details
RuPaul's Drag Race Live: The Official Vegas Soundtrack	Artist: RuPaul's Drag Race Live!; Release date: January 27, 2020; Label: World of Wonder Productions, Inc.; Formats: Streaming, digital download
Madonna: The Unauthorized Rusical	Artist: The Cast of RuPaul's Drag Race, Season 12; Release date: April 11, 2020; Label: World of Wonder Productions, Inc.; Formats: Streaming, digital download
Social Media: The Unverified Rusical	Artist: The Cast of RuPaul's Drag Race, Season 13; Release date: February 20, 2021; Label: World of Wonder Productions, Inc.; Formats: Streaming, digital download

Singles

Title	Year	Peak chart positions		Album
Title	Year	US Elec.	US Elec. Digital	Album
"Cover Girl" (RuPaul featuring BeBe Zahara Benet)	2009	-	-	Jealous of My Boogie - The RuMixes
"The Shade of It All" (DJ ShyBoy and RuPaul featuring the Cast of RuPaul's Drag Race)	2013	-	-	Non-album singles
"Runway Girl" (DJ ShyBoy and RuPaul featuring the Cast of RuPaul's Drag Race)	2013	-	-	Non-album singles
"Reading Is Fundamental" (DJ ShyBoy and RuPaul featuring the Cast of RuPaul's Drag Race)	2013	-	-	Non-album singles
"Can I Get an Amen?" (RuPaul featuring the Cast of RuPaul's Drag Race, Season 5)	2013	-	-	Non-album singles
"It's Not Personal (It's Drag) [Remix]" (DJ ShyBoy and RuPaul featuring the Cast of RuPaul's Drag Race, Season 5)	2013	-	-	Non-album singles
"Oh No She Betta Don't" (RuPaul and DJ ShyBoy featuring the Cast of RuPaul's Drag Race, Season 6)	2014	-	-	Non-album singles
"Fat, Fem, and Asian (From "RuPaul's Drag Race 8)") (Lucian Piane)	2016	-	-	Non-album singles
"I Don't Like to Show Off (From "RuPaul's Drag Race 8)") (Lucian Piane)	2016	-	-	Non-album singles
"Legs (From RuPaul's Drag Race 8") (Lucian Piane)	2016	-	-	Non-album singles
"PharmaRusical" (RuPaul)	2018	-	-	Non-album singles
"Category Is" (RuPaul featuring the Cast of RuPaul's Drag Race, Season 9)	2018	-	-	Non-album singles
"Cher: The Unauthorized Rusical" (RuPaul featuring the Cast of RuPaul's Drag Race, Season 10)	2018	-	-	Non-album singles
"American" (RuPaul featuring the Cast of RuPaul's Drag Race, Season 10)	2018	-	12	Non-album singles
"Trump: The Rusical" (The Cast of RuPaul's Drag Race, Season 11 featuring April Malina, Melodye Perry, Brooke Wilkes, Devon Weigel and Anna Graves)	2019	-	-	Non-album singles
"Queens Everywhere (Cast Version)" (RuPaul featuring the Cast of RuPaul's Drag Race, Season 11)	2019	-	20	Non-album singles
"I'm That Bitch" (RuPaul featuring the Cast of RuPaul's Drag Race, Season 12)	2020	49	8	Non-album singles
"You Don't Know Me" (The Cast of RuPaul's Drag Race, Season 12)	2020	-	-	Non-album singles
"I Made It / Mirror Song / Losing is the New Winning (Las Vegas Live Medley)" (The Cast of RuPaul's Drag Race, Season 12)	2020	-	-	Non-album singles
"The Shady Bunch" (The Cast of RuPaul's Drag Race, Season 12)	2020	-	-	Non-album singles
"ConDragulations (Cast Version)" (The Cast of RuPaul's Drag Race, Season 13)	2021	-	-	Non-album singles
"Phenomenon (Cast Version)" (The Cast of RuPaul's Drag Race, Season 13)	2021	-	-	Non-album singles
"Lucky" (RuPaul featuring the Cast of RuPaul's Drag Race, Season 13)	2021	-	-	Non-album singles
"Save a Queen" (The Cast of RuPaul's Drag Race, Season 14)	2022	-	-	Non-album singles
"My Baby is Love: The RuPremes" (The Cast of RuPaul's Drag Race, Season 14)	2022	-	-	Non-album singles
"He's My Baby: The RuNettes" (The Cast of RuPaul's Drag Race, Season 14)	2022	-	-	Non-album singles
"Bad Boy Baby Baby: The ShangRu-Las" (The Cast of RuPaul's Drag Race, Season 14)	2022	-	-	Non-album singles
"Catwalk (Cast Version)" (RuPaul featuring the Cast of RuPaul's Drag Race, Season 14)	2022	-	-	Non-album singles
"I Hate People" (Willow Pill)	2022	—	-	Non-album singles
"I Fell Down (I Got Up)" (Lady Camden)	2022	—	-	Non-album singles
"Fighter" (Daya Betty)	2022	—	-	Non-album singles
"Devil" (Bosco)	2022	—	-	Non-album singles
"Check My Track Record" (Angeria Paris VanMicheals)	2022	—	-	Non-album singles
"I Hate People (XL Version)" (Willow Pill)	2022	-	-	Non-album singles
"One Night Only" (The Cast of RuPaul's Drag Race, Season 15)	2023	-	-	Non-album singles
"Golden Years (Rockin' Old Gs)" (The Cast of RuPaul's Drag Race, Season 15)	2023	-	-	Non-album singles
"Golden Hips (Ol' Dirty Bitches)" (The Cast of RuPaul's Drag Race, Season 15)	2023	-	-	Non-album singles
"Golden Girlfriends (Banjo Bitches)" (The Cast of RuPaul's Drag Race, Season 15)	2023	-	-	Non-album singles
"Blame it On the Edit" (RuPaul featuring The Cast of RuPaul's Drag Race, Season 15)	2023	—	-	Non-album singles
"Lotus" (Anetra)	2023	—	-	Non-album singles
"It's Giving Fashion" (Luxx Noir London)	2023	—	-	Non-album singles
"Delusion" (Mistress Isabelle Brooks)	2023	—	-	Non-album singles
"Goddess" (Sasha Colby)	2023	-	-	Non-album singles

== RuPaul's Drag Race All Stars ==
=== Extended plays ===
Title	Details
Halftime Headliners	Artist: Cast of RuPaul's Drag Race All Stars, Season 6; Release date: July 9, 2021; Label: World of Wonder Productions, Inc.; Formats: Streaming, digital download
Joan!: The Rusical	Artist: The Cast of RuPaul's Drag Race All Stars, Season 8; Release date: June 10, 2023; Label: World of Wonder Productions, Inc.; Formats: Streaming, digital download

=== Singles ===
Title	Year	Peak chart positions		Album
Title	Year	US Elec.	US Elec. Digital	Album
"The Baddest Bitches in Herstory" (Lucian Piane)	2016	-	-	Non album singles
"Read U Wrote U (Ellis Miah Mix)" (RuPaul featuring the Cast of RuPaul's Drag Race All Stars, Season 2)	2016	29	14	Non album singles
"Divas Live" (RuPaul)	2018	-	-	Non album singles
"Drag Up Your Life" (RuPaul featuring BeBe Zahara Benet, BenDeLaCreme, Kennedy Davenport, Shangela, and Trixie Mattel)	2018	-	-	Non album singles
"Sitting on a Secret" (RuPaul featuring Aja, Chi Chi DeVayne, Milk, Morgan McMichaels, and Thorgy Thor)	2018	-	-	Non album singles
"Kitty Girl" (RuPaul featuring the Cast of RuPaul's Drag Race All Stars, Season 3) (Note: "Kitty Girl (AS3 Version)" is included on Trixie Mattel's 2019 soundtrack Trixie Mattel: Moving Parts (The Acoustic Soundtrack))	2018	18	8	Non album singles
"Errybody Say Love" (The Cast of RuPaul's Drag Race All Stars, Season 4)	2018	-	-	Non album singles
"Don't Funk It Up" (The Cast of RuPaul's Drag Race All Stars, Season 4)	2018	-	-	Non album singles
"My Best Judy" (The Cast of RuPaul's Drag Race All Stars, Season 4 featuring April Malina and Brooke Wilkes)	2019	-	-	Non album singles
"Super Queen (Cast Version)" (RuPaul featuring the Cast of RuPaul's Drag Race All Stars, Season 4)	2019	-	-	Non album singles
"I'm in Love" (The Cast of RuPaul's Drag Race All Stars, Season 5)	2020	-	-	Non album singles
"Clapback" (RuPaul featuring the Cast of RuPaul's Drag Race All Stars, Season 5)	2020	-	-	Non album singles
"Show Up Queen" (The cast of RuPaul's Drag Race All Stars, Season 6)	2021	—	—	Non album singles
"This Is Our Country" (Cast Version) (RuPaul and Tanya Tucker featuring the cast of RuPaul's Drag Race All Stars, Season 6)	2021	—	—	Non album singles
"Legends" (Cast Version) (RuPaul featuring the cast of RuPaul's Drag Race All Stars, Season 7)	2022	—	—	Non album singles
"Titanic" (MSTR) (The cast of RuPaul's Drag Race All Stars, Season 7)	2022	—	—	Non album singles
"2getha 4eva" (The Other Girls) (The cast of RuPaul's Drag Race All Stars, Season 7)	2022	—	—	Non album singles
"Money, Success, Fame, Glamour (Disco Mix)" (The Cast of RuPaul's Drag Race All Stars, Season 8)	2023	-	-	Non album singles
"Money, Success, Fame, Glamour (Glam Rock Mix)"| (The Cast of RuPaul's Drag Race All Stars, Season 8)	2023	-	-	Non album singles

== RuPaul's Drag Race UK ==
=== Singles ===
Title	Year	Peak chart positions						Album
Title	Year	UK	UK Dance	UK Down.	UK Sales	UK Stream	US Elec.	Album
"Break Up (Bye Bye) (Filth Harmony Version)" (The Cast of RuPaul's Drag Race UK)	2019	-	-	-	-	-	-	Non album single
"Break Up (Bye Bye) (Frock Destroyers Version)" (The Cast of RuPaul's Drag Race UK and Frock Destroyers)	2019	35	-	3	3	88	44	Frock4Life
"To the Moon (Cast Version) (RuPaul featuring the Cast of RuPaul's Drag Race UK)	2019	-	-	-	-	-	-	Non-album singles
"Rats: The Rusical" (The Cast of RuPaul's Drag Race UK, Season 2)	2021	-	-	-	-	-	-	Non-album singles
"UK Hun? (Bananadrama Version)" (The Cast of RuPaul's Drag Race UK, Season 2)	2021	-	-	-	-	-	-	Non-album singles
"UK Hun? (United Kingdolls Version)" (The Cast of RuPaul's Drag Race UK, Season 2)	2021	27	9	2	2	-	-	Non-album singles
"A Little Bit of Love (Cast Version)" (RuPaul featuring the Cast of RuPaul's Drag Race UK, Season 2)	2021	-	-	-	-	-	-	Non-album singles
"B.D.E. (Big Drag Energy) [Pick 'n' Mix]" (The Cast of RuPaul's Drag Race UK, Series 3)	2021	-	-	39	40	-	-	Non-album singles
"B.D.E. (Big Drag Energy) [Slice Girls]" (The Cast of RuPaul's Drag Race UK, Series 3)	2021	-	-	-	-	-	-	Non-album singles
"Hey Sis, It's Christmas (Cast Version)" (RuPaul featuring the Cast of RuPaul's Drag Race UK, Series 3)	2021	-	-	26	30	-	-	Non-album singles
"Come Alive (Queens of the Bone Age Version)" (The Cast of RuPaul's Drag Race UK, Series 4)	2022	-	-	-	-	-	-	Non-album singles
"Come Alive (The Triple Threats Version)" (The Cast of RuPaul's Drag Race UK, Series 4)	2022	-	-	-	-	-	-	Non-album singles
"Lairy Poppins: The Rusical" (The Cast of RuPaul's Drag Race UK, Series 4)	2022	-	-	-	-	-	-	Non-album singles
"UK Grand Finale Megamix" (RuPaul featuring the Cast of RuPaul's Drag Race UK, Series 4)	2022	-	-	-	-	-	-	Non-album singles

== RuPaul's Secret Celebrity Drag Race ==
=== Singles ===
Title	Year	Album
"Twerkin' 5 to 9: The Rusical" (The Cast of RuPaul's Secret Celebrity Drag Race featuring Christina Bianco and April Malina)	2020	Non-album single

== Canada's Drag Race ==
=== Extended plays ===
Title	Details
Under the Big Top	Artist: Cast of Canada's Drag Race, Season 2; Release date: August 23, 2022; Label: DR Canada Two Productions, inc.; Formats: Streaming, digital download

=== Singles ===
Title	Year	Album
"Not Sorry Aboot It" (The Cast of Canada's Drag Race, Season 1)	2020	Non-album singles
"U Wear It Well (Queens of the North Ru-Mix)" (RuPaul featuring the Cast of Canada's Drag Race, Season 1)	2020	Non-album singles
"Bye, Flop! (Dosey Hoes)" (The Cast of Canada's Drag Race, Season 2)	2021	Non-album singles
"Bye Flop! (Giddy Girls)" (The Cast of Canada's Drag Race, Season 2)	2021	Non-album singles
"Queen of the North" (Brooke Lynn Hytes featuring the Cast of Canada's Drag Race, Season 2)	2022	Non-album singles
"Squirrels Trip: The Rusical" (The Cast of Canada's Drag Race, Season 3)	2022	Non-album singles
"True North Strong and Fierce" (The Cast of Canada's Drag Race, Season 3)	2022	Non-album singles

== Drag Race España ==
=== Singles ===
Title	Year	Album
"Divas (Las Cinco y Cuarto Version)" (The Cast of Drag Race España, Season 1)	2021	Non-album singles
"Divas (Las Metal Donnas Version)" (The Cast of Drag Race España, Season 1)	2021	Non-album singles

== RuPaul's Drag Race Down Under ==
=== Singles ===
Title	Year	Album
"Queens Down Under (Outback Fake Hoes)" (The Cast of RuPaul's Drag Race Down Under, Season 1)	2021	Non-album singles
"Queens Down Under (Three and a Half Men)" (The Cast of RuPaul's Drag Race Down Under, Season 1)	2021	Non-album singles
"I'm a Winner, Baby (Cast Version)" (RuPaul featuring the Cast of RuPaul's Drag Race Down Under, Season 1)	2021	Non-album singles
"Bosom Buddies (BAB'z Version)" (The Cast of RuPaul's Drag Race Down Under, Season 2)	2022	Non-album singles
"Bosom Buddies (Hung Divas Version)" (The Cast of RuPaul's Drag Race Down Under, Season 2)	2022	Non-album singles
"Who is She? (Cast Version)" (RuPaul featuring the Cast of RuPaul's Drag Race Down Under, Season 2)	2022	Non-album singles

== RuPaul's Drag Race: UK vs. the World ==
=== Singles ===
Title	Year	Album
"West End Wendys: The Rusical" (The Cast of RuPaul's Drag Race: UK vs. the World, Season 1)	2022	Non-album singles
"Living My Life in London (Cast Version)" (RuPaul featuring the Cast of RuPaul's Drag Race: UK vs. the World, Season 1)	2022	Non-album singles

== Drag Race France ==
=== Singles ===
Title	Year	Album
"Boom Boom (Les soeurs Jacquettes)" (The Cast of Drag Race France, Season 1)	2022	Non-album singles
"Boom Boom (The Nails)" (The Cast of Drag Race France, Season 1)	2022	Non-album singles

== Drag Race Philippines ==
=== Singles ===
Title	Year	Album
"Pop Off Ate (Flexbomb Girls Version)" (The Cast of Drag Race Philippines, Season 1)	2022	Non-album singles
"Pop Off Ate (Pink Pussy Energy Version)" (The Cast of Drag Race Philippines, Season 1)	2022	Non-album singles

== Canada's Drag Race: Canada vs. the World ==
=== Singles ===
Title	Year	Album
Bonjour, Hi! (Maple She-rups Version)" (The Cast of Canada's Drag Race: Canada vs. the World, Season 1)	2022	Non-album singles
"Bonjour, Hi! (SRV Version)" (The Cast of Canada's Drag Race: Canada vs. the World, Season 1)	2022	Non-album singles
"Bonjour, Hi (Touché Version) (The Cast of Canada's Drag Race: Canada vs. the World, Season 1)	2022	Non-album singles

== Drag Race Belgique ==
=== Singles ===
Title	Year	Album
"Fierce" (The Cast of Drag Race Belgique, Season 1 featuring Laura Crowe & Him)	2023	Non-album single
