= Ellis Miah =

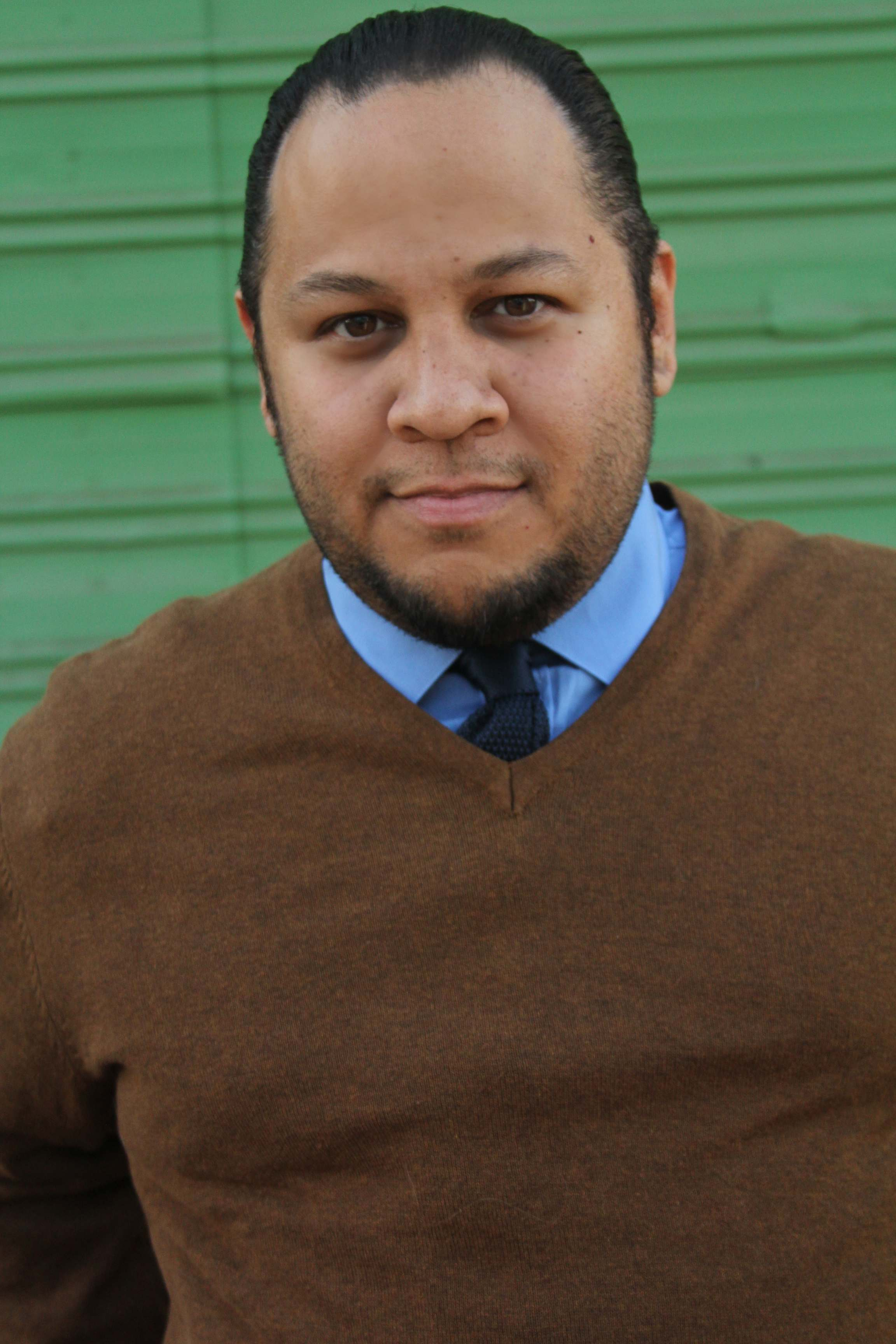
- Miah in 2013

Background information
- Born: March 21; New York City
- Genres: Pop
- Occupations: Producer, songwriter, actor
- Website: ellismiahmusic.com

Ellis Miah (born March 21 in New York City) is an American songwriter, record producer, composer, vocalist and DJ of Bangladeshi and Caribbean descent. He has had over 17 records on various Billboard charts including the Billboard 200, Electronic Album, Club Play and Maxi Singles as part of the production teams the Orange Factory and Beat Hustlerz. As a songwriter, producer and remixer he has worked with artists including Miley Cyrus, Backstreet Boys, Annie Lennox, RuPaul, Big Freedia, Siedah Garrett, Todrick Hall, and Loleatta Holloway.

In 2014 Miah founded the boutique record label Bodega Superette. Its first artist was Zarina Nares daughter of famed artist Jamie Nares, her debut ep “I'm To Blame” was produced by Miah and released in late 2014.

Miah's music has also been featured extensively on film and TV including Sex and the City, Ray J and Brandy Family Business, Hit the Floor, Brokenhearts Club, RuPaul's Drag Race, Dragrace Allstars, and Punks. In 2013, "Sugar daddy's Little Girl" produced and co-written by Miah was used in the national Klondike Choco-Taco commercials. Also in 2013 he along with Keo Nozari composed the ABC Nightline Prime theme song.
