= Werq the World =

Tour featuring RuPaul's Drag Race contestants

- Tour by RuPaul's Drag Race
- Promotional graphic for the 2019 Werq the World tour
- Location: North America; Europe; Latin America; Asia; Oceania
- Start date: May 26, 2017
- Legs: 25
- Website: www.vossevents.com/tour/rupauls-drag-race-werq-the-world-tour-world-tour

The Werq the World tour is an ongoing tour featuring drag queens from RuPaul's Drag Race. The tour, created by Brandon Voss, is produced by Voss Events in collaboration with VH1 and World of Wonder. It is known for its large-scale shows on stages with jumbotron screens, which give performances a concert-style feel.

== History ==
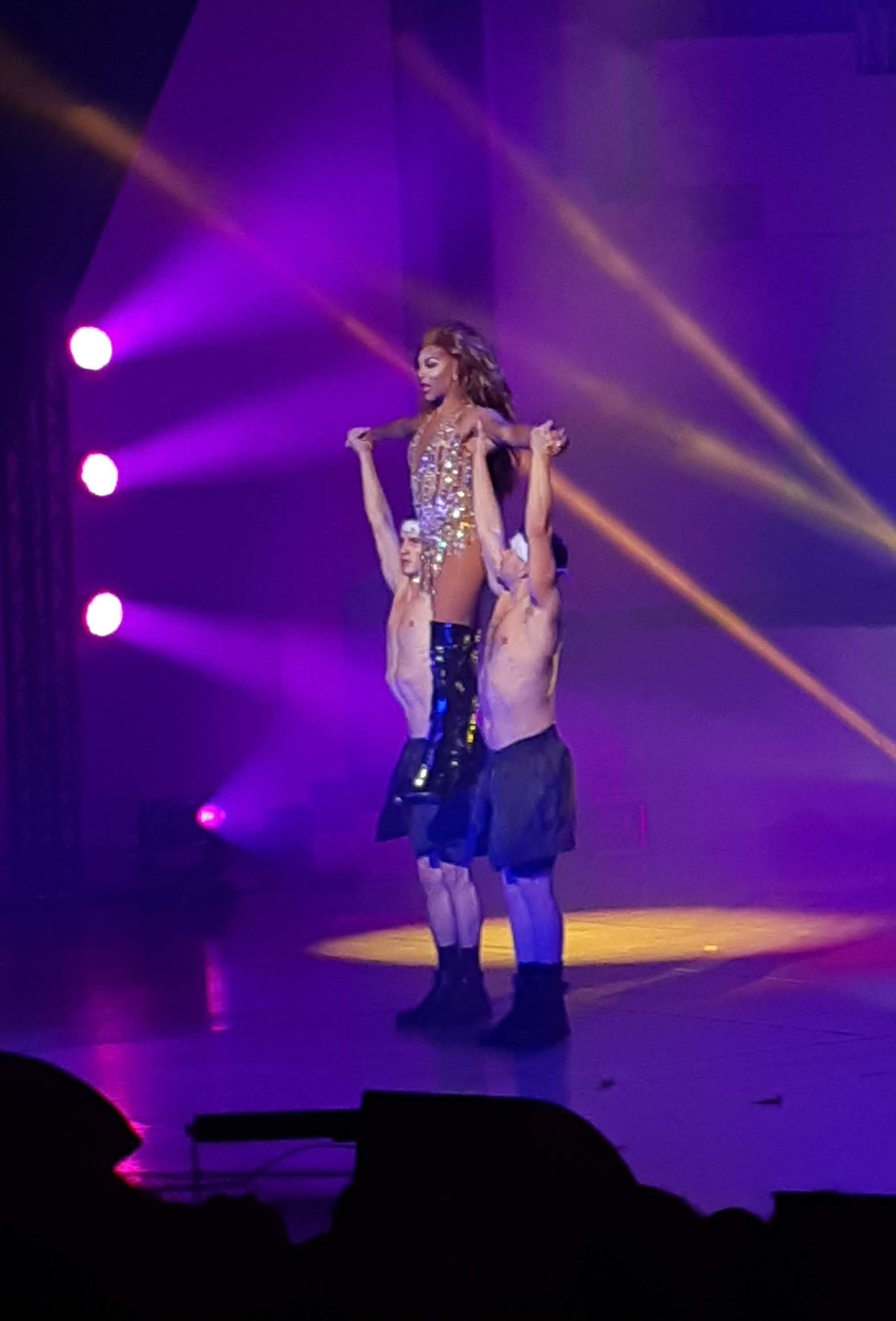
Shangela performing at Werq the World 2018

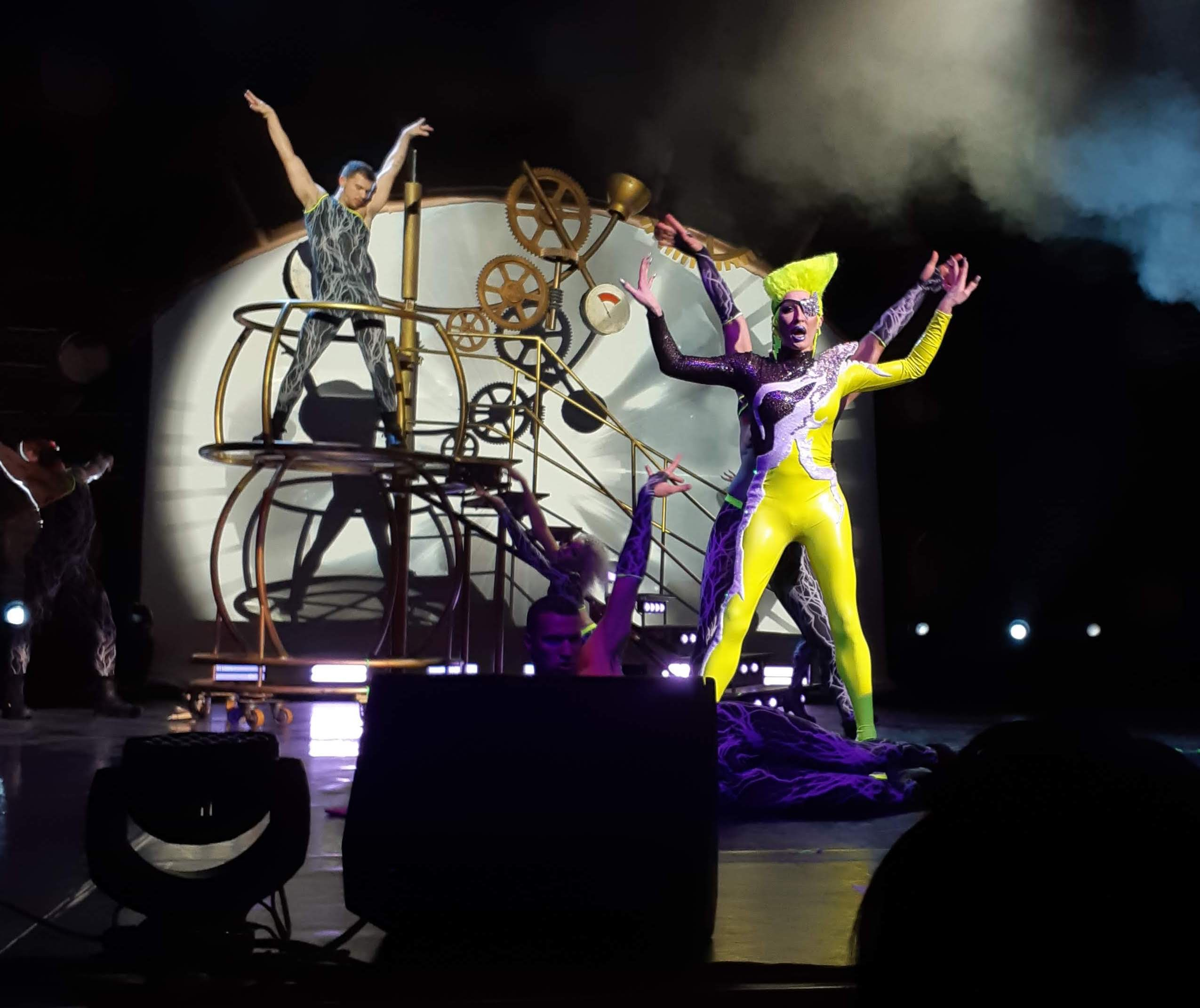
Detox performing at Werq the World 2019

Werq the World was forced to reschedule its October 2017 stop in Houston due to the devastation caused by Hurricane Harvey. The tour returned to that city on February 7, 2018, with the queens making a donation to the Montrose Center's LGBTQ Hurricane Harvey Relief Fund. The donation was matched by Voss Events.

In May 2019, World of Wonder debuted Werq the World, a 10-episode docuseries directed by Jasper Rischen. It presents behind-the-scenes looks at the lives of the performers who were on the 2018 European leg of the tour, with each episode profiling a different queen. A second season of the docuseries started streaming in June 2020.

The spring 2020 European leg of Werq the World was rescheduled for spring 2022 due to the COVID-19 pandemic.

On December 20, 2022, the dates for the Europe leg in 2023 were announced. Starting from October 27 to November 14. On March 6, 2023, the rest of the dates were announced for the 2023 leg of the tour.

On November 12, 2024, the dates for the Europe leg in 2025 were announced. Starting from April 6 to April 18. The 2025 North American leg of the tour consists of 40 shows running from August 15 through October 25.

On May 21, 2026, the 2027 North American leg has been announced for the tenth anniversary of Werq the World.

== Tour dates ==
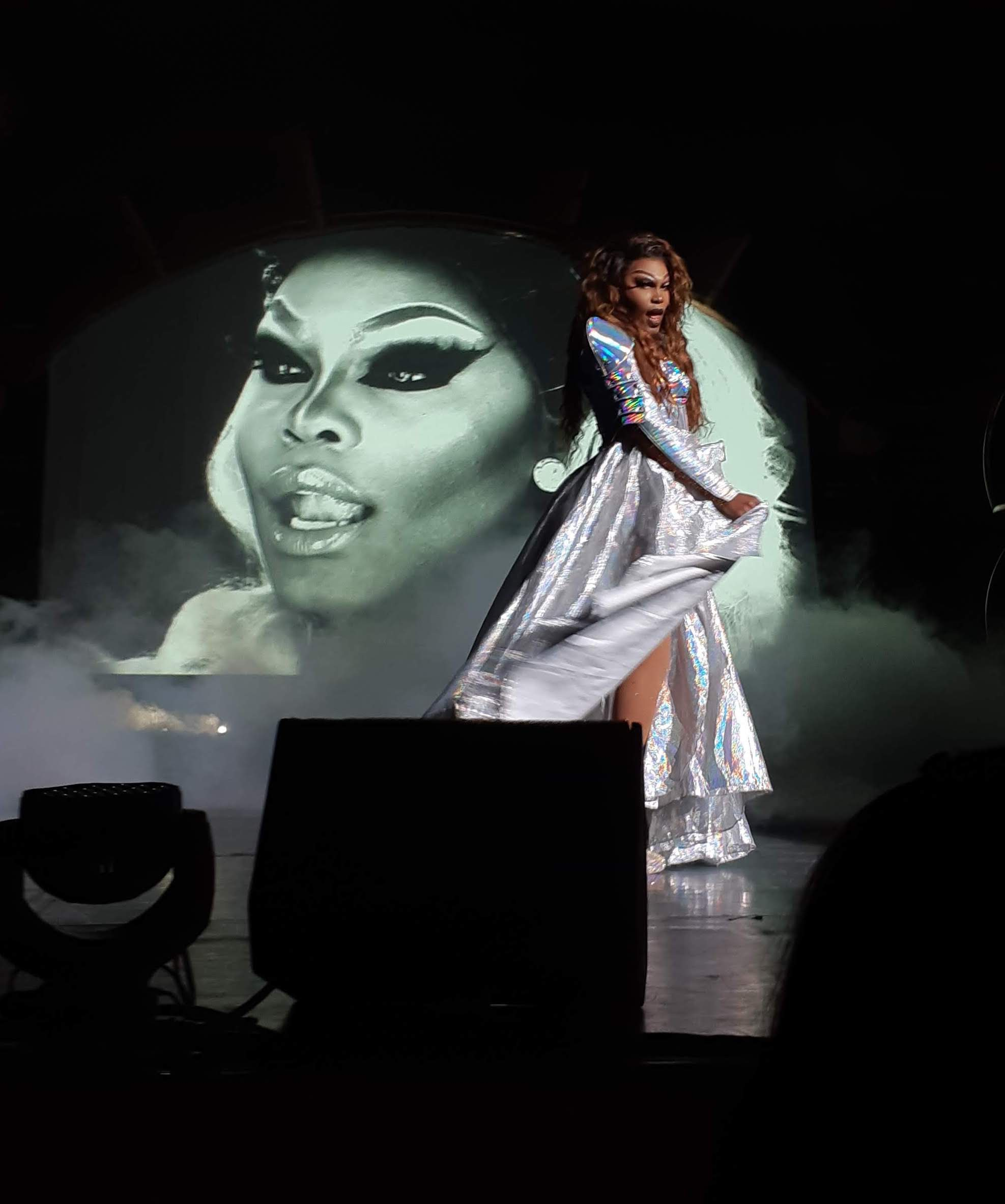
Asia O'Hara performing at Werq the World 2019

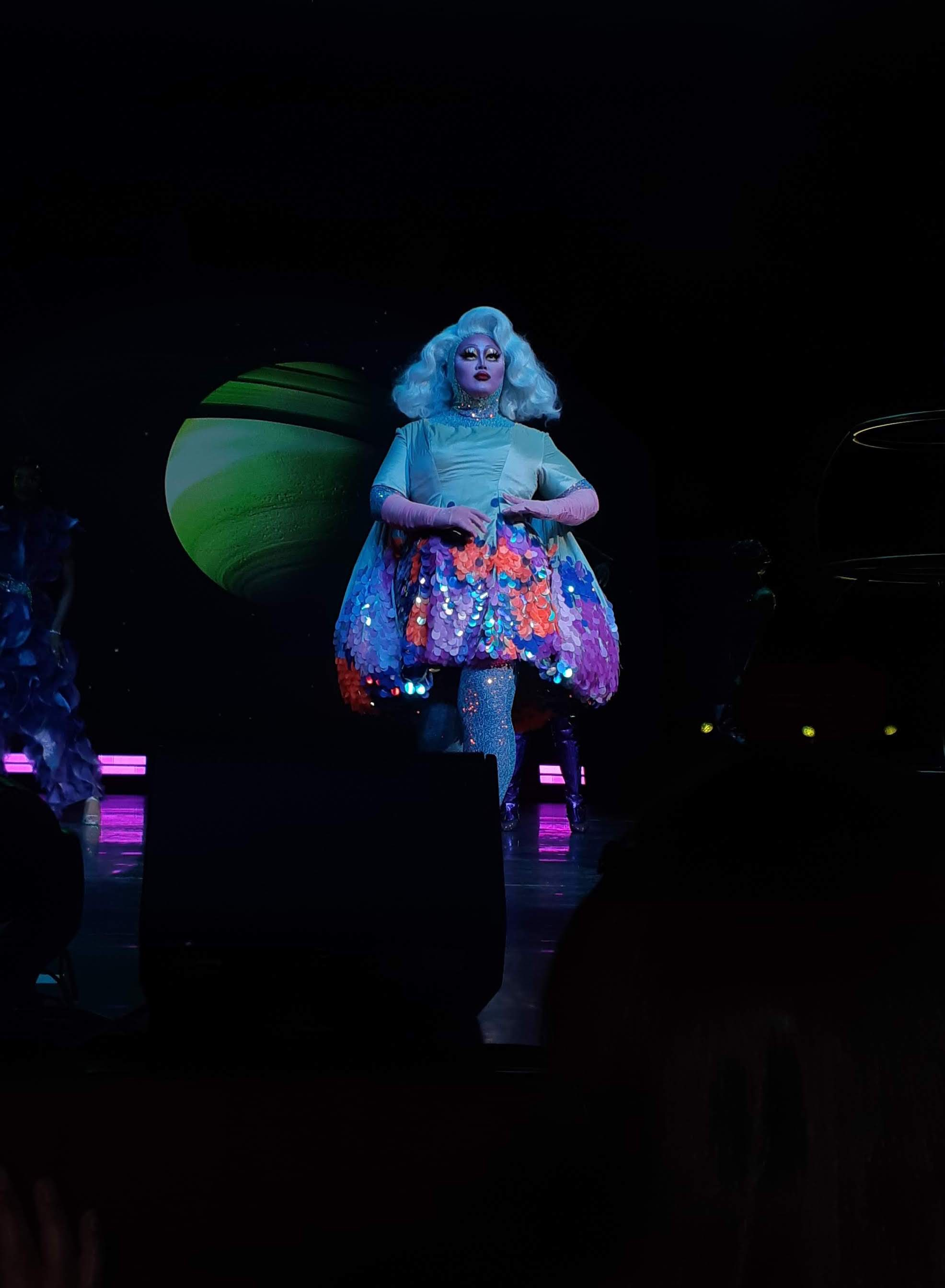
Kim Chi performing at Werq the World 2019

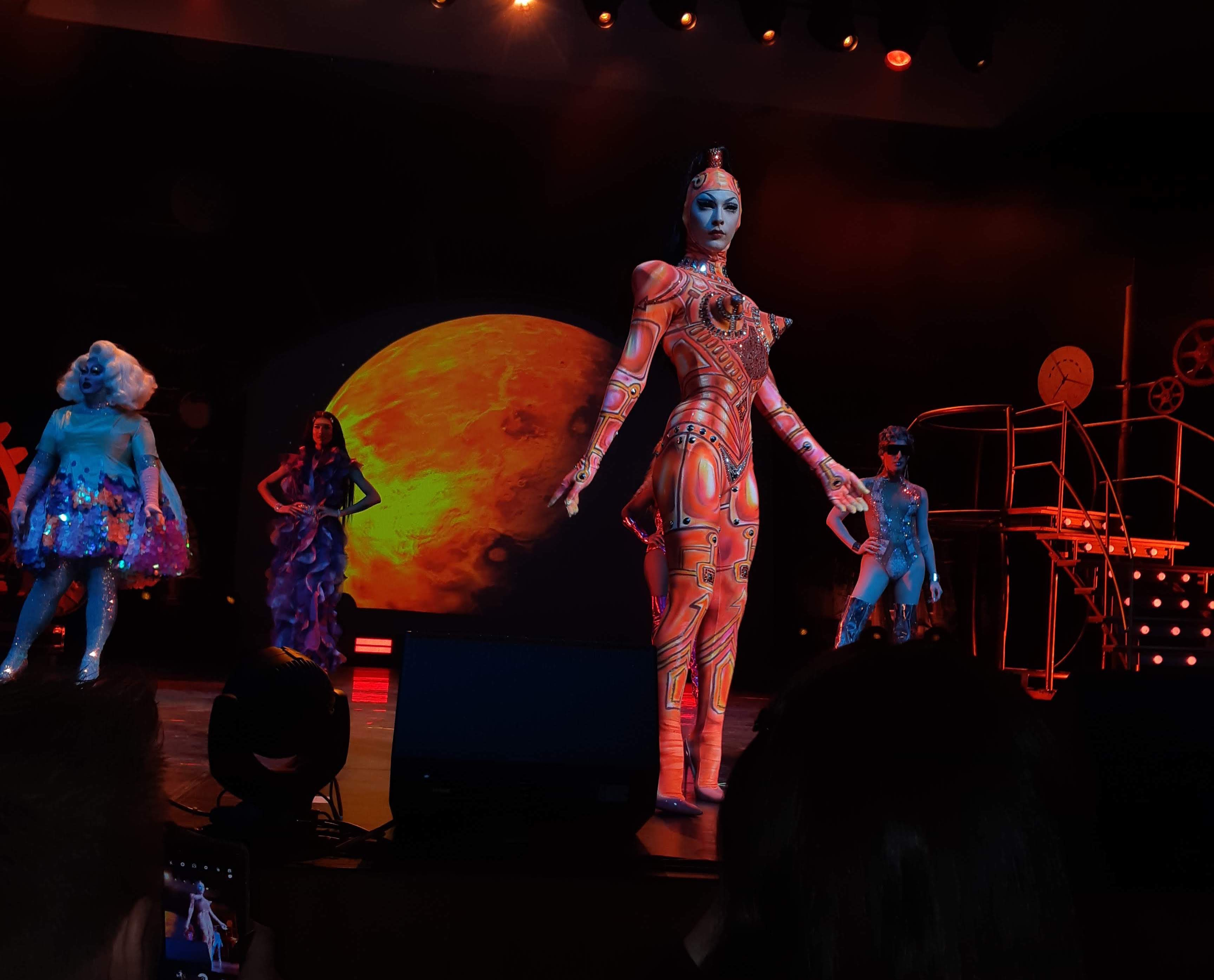
Violet Chachki performing at Werq the World 2019

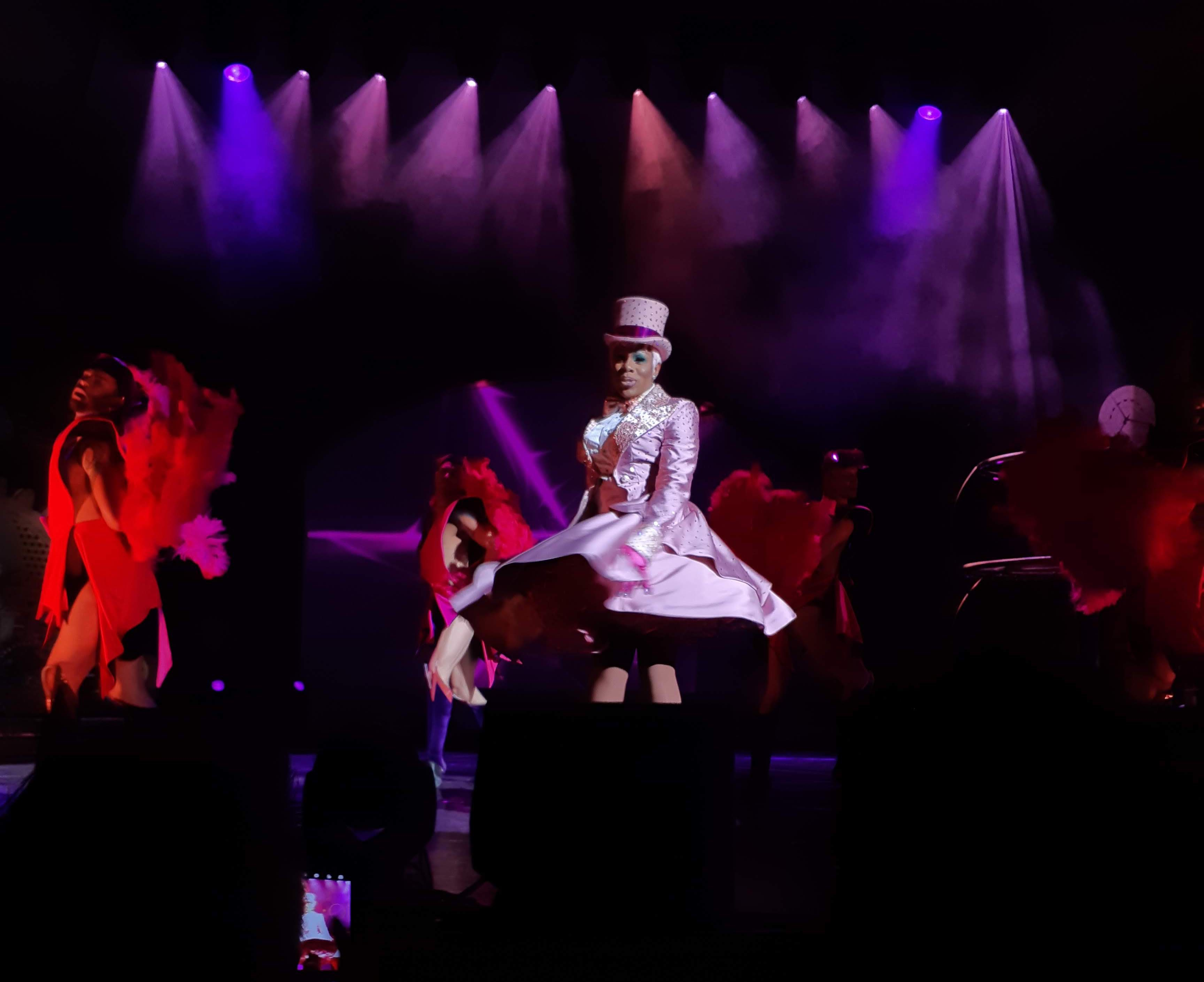
Monét X Change performing at Werq the World 2019

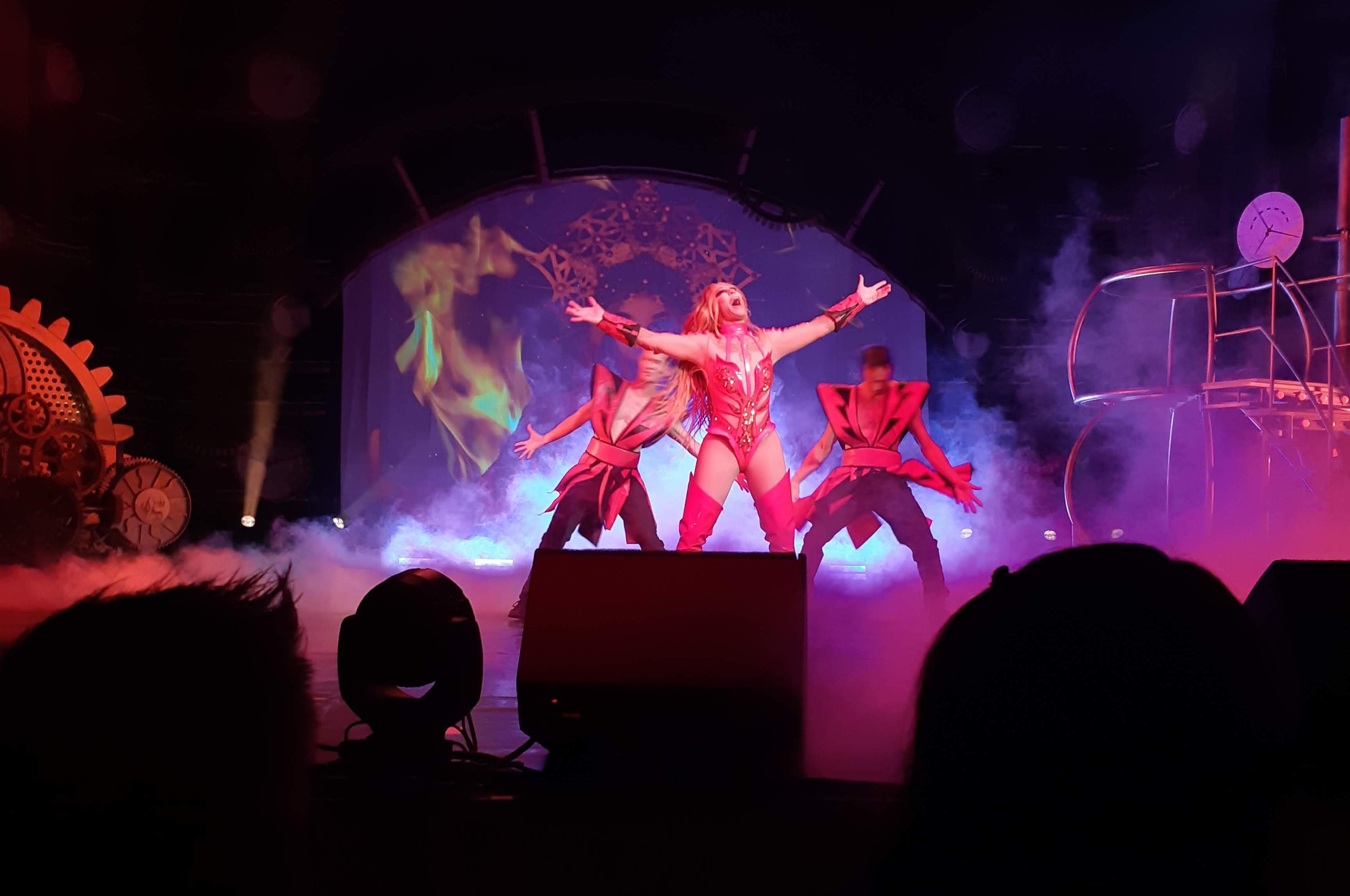
Kameron Michaels performing at Werq the World 2019

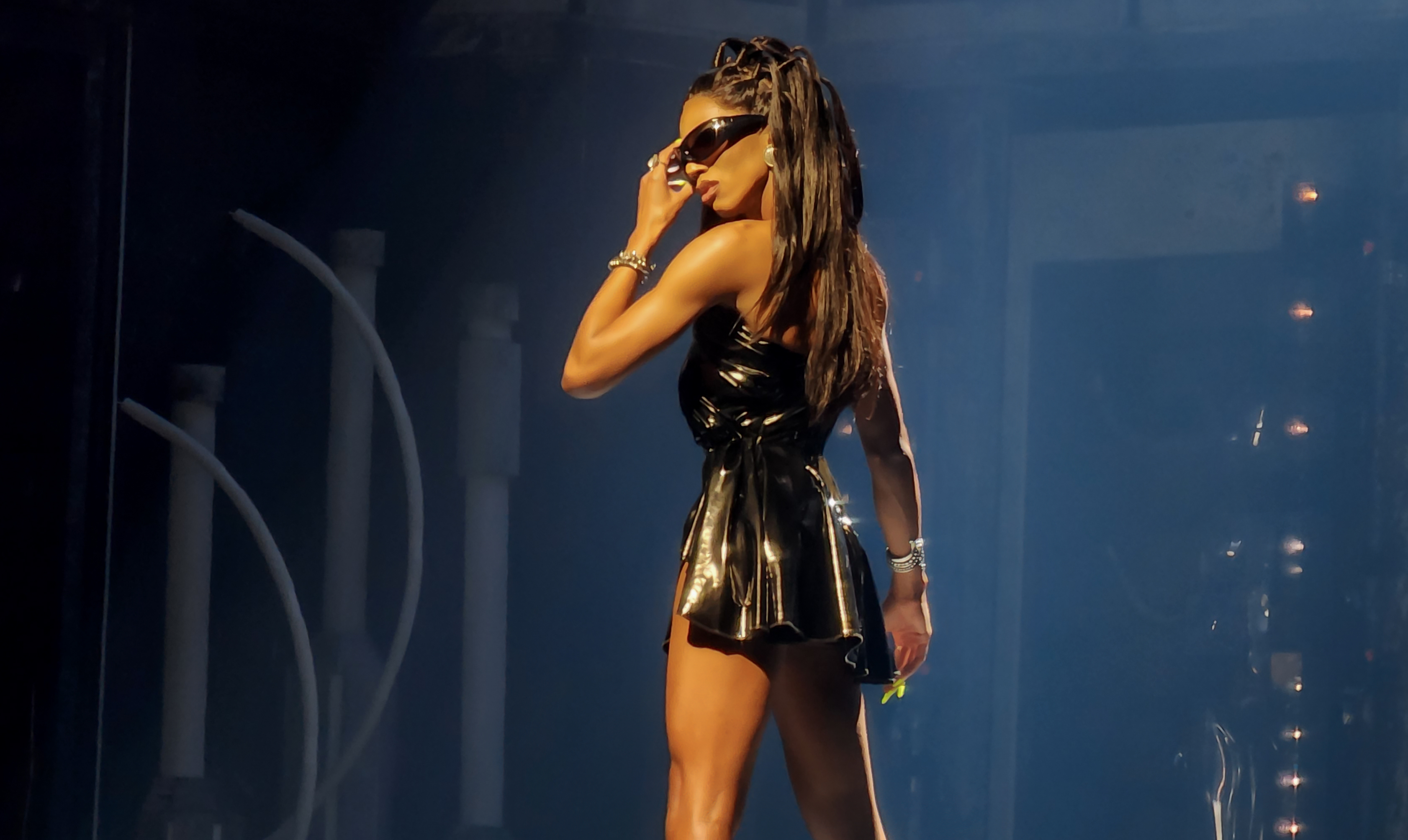
Naomi Smalls performing at Werq the World 2023

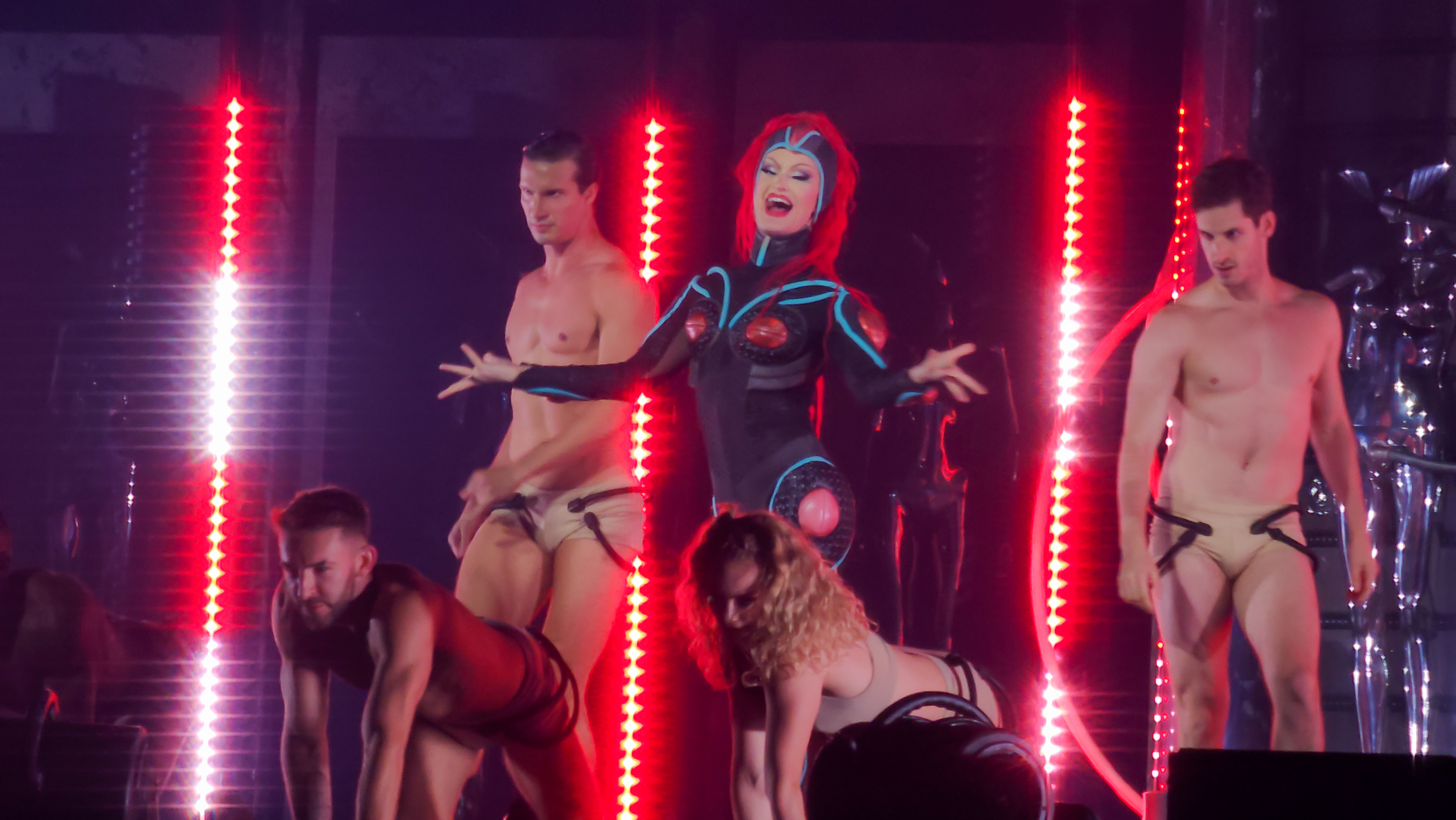
Lady Camden performing at Werq the World 2023

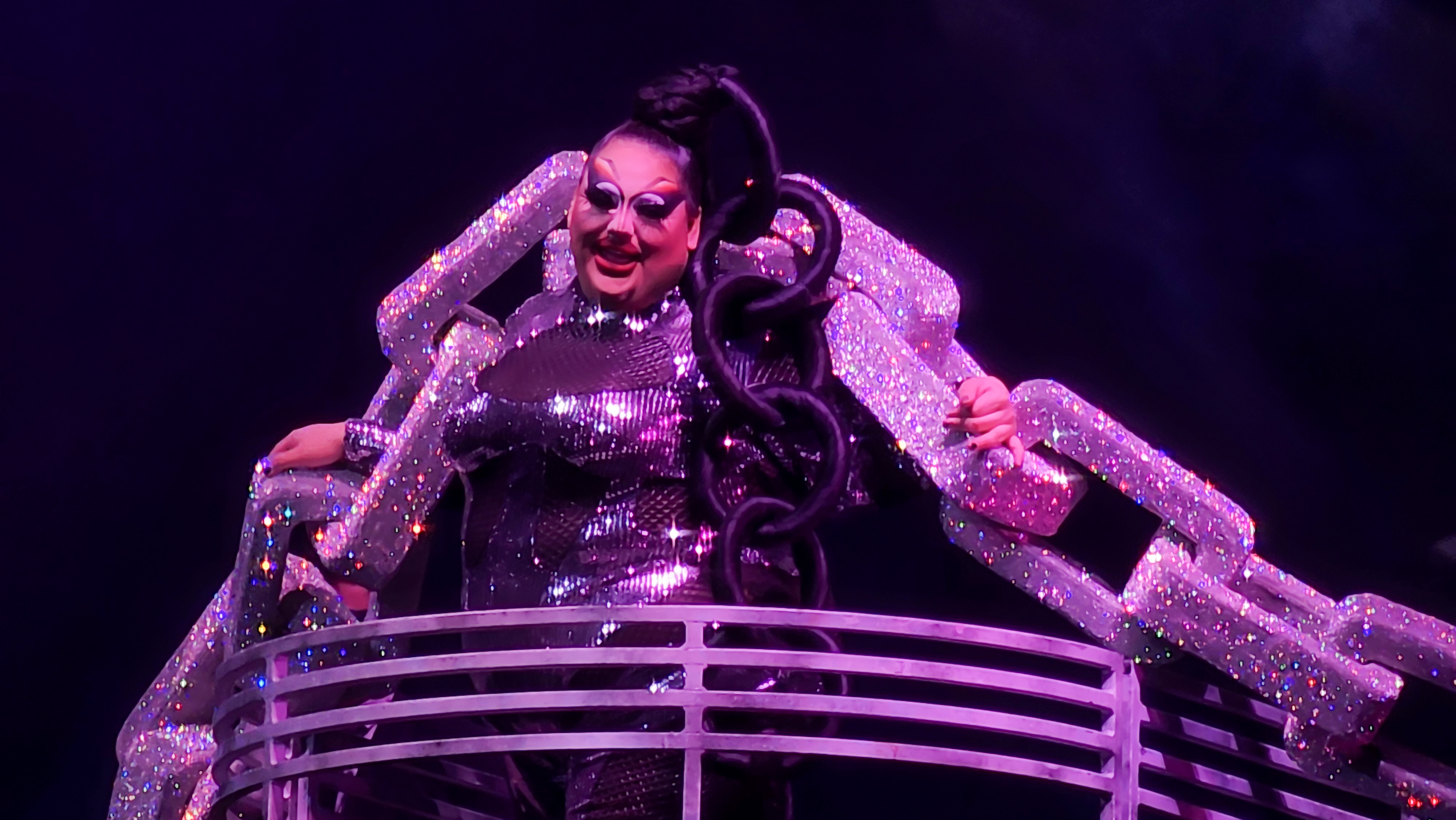
Mistress Isabelle Brooks performing at Werq the World 2023

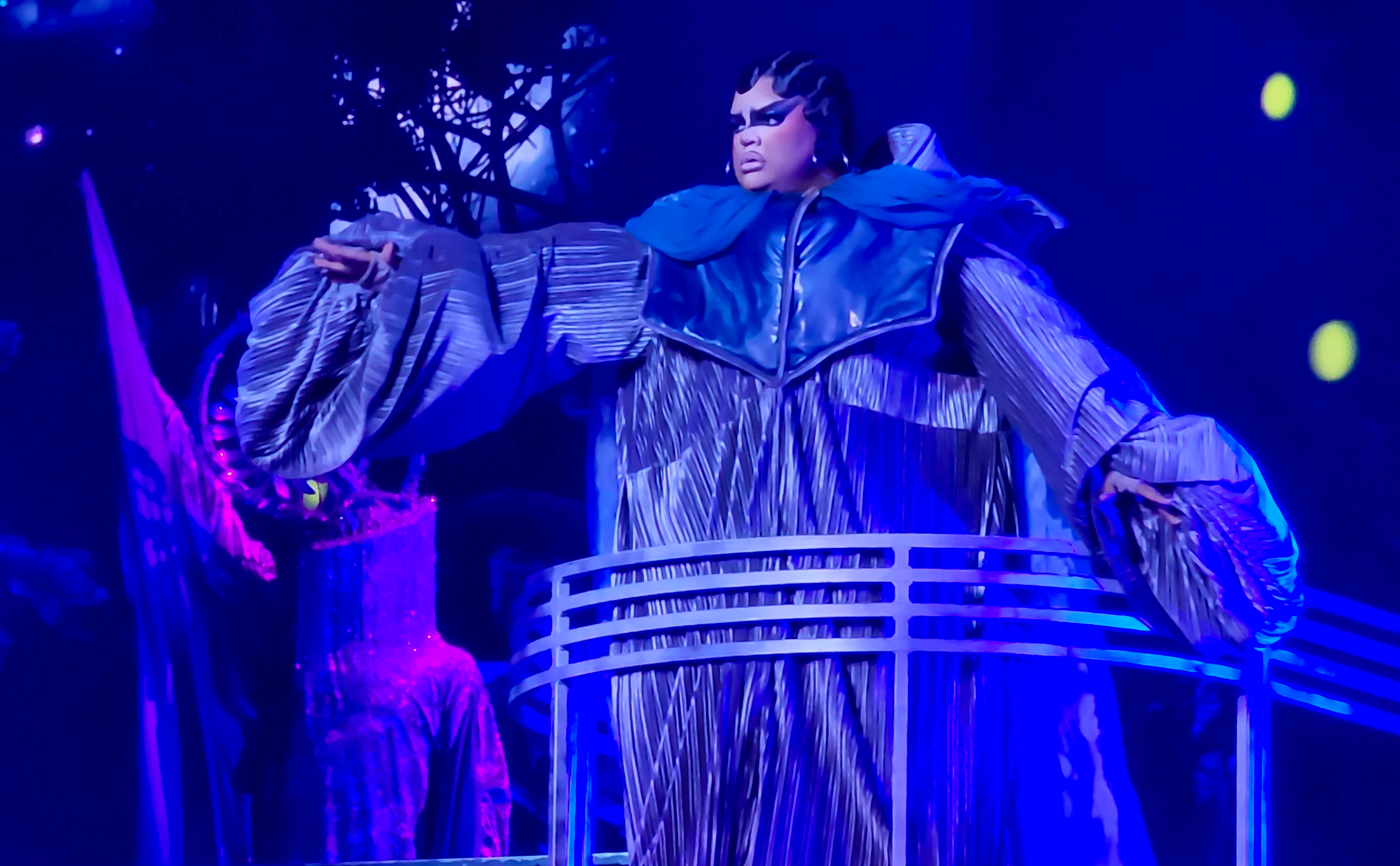
Kandy Muse performing at Werq the World 2023

=== 2017 dates ===
Date	City	Country	Venue	Host	Performers
Leg 1 – North America
May 26, 2017	Toronto	Canada	Danforth Music Hall	Bianca Del Rio	Alaska Thunderfuck; Alyssa Edwards; Detox; Kim Chi; Shangela; Shea Couleé; Valentina
May 27, 2017	Montreal	Canada	Théâtre Telus	Bianca Del Rio	Alaska Thunderfuck; Alyssa Edwards; Detox; Kim Chi; Shangela; Shea Couleé; Valentina
Leg 2 – Europe
May 30, 2017	London	England	Troxy	Bianca Del Rio; Michelle Visage; Shangela	Aja; Alaska Thunderfuck; Alyssa Edwards; Derrick Barry; Detox; Kim Chi; Kennedy Davenport; Latrice Royale; Peppermint; Shangela; Shea Couleé; Trinity the Tuck; Violet Chachki
June 1, 2017	Dublin	Ireland	3Olympia Theatre	Bianca Del Rio; Michelle Visage; Shangela	Aja; Alaska Thunderfuck; Alyssa Edwards; Derrick Barry; Detox; Kim Chi; Kennedy Davenport; Latrice Royale; Peppermint; Shangela; Shea Couleé; Trinity the Tuck; Violet Chachki
June 2, 2017	Stockholm	Sweden	Göta Lejon	Bianca Del Rio; Michelle Visage; Shangela	Aja; Alaska Thunderfuck; Alyssa Edwards; Derrick Barry; Detox; Kim Chi; Kennedy Davenport; Latrice Royale; Peppermint; Shangela; Shea Couleé; Trinity the Tuck; Violet Chachki
June 3, 2017	Oslo	Norway	Folketeateret	Bianca Del Rio; Michelle Visage; Shangela	Aja; Alaska Thunderfuck; Alyssa Edwards; Derrick Barry; Detox; Kim Chi; Kennedy Davenport; Latrice Royale; Peppermint; Shangela; Shea Couleé; Trinity the Tuck; Violet Chachki
June 4, 2017	Copenhagen	Denmark	DR Koncerthuset	Bianca Del Rio; Michelle Visage; Shangela	Aja; Alaska Thunderfuck; Alyssa Edwards; Derrick Barry; Detox; Kim Chi; Kennedy Davenport; Latrice Royale; Peppermint; Shangela; Shea Couleé; Trinity the Tuck; Violet Chachki
June 7, 2017	Zürich	Switzerland	Plaza Klub Zürich	Bianca Del Rio; Michelle Visage; Shangela	Aja; Alaska Thunderfuck; Alyssa Edwards; Derrick Barry; Detox; Kim Chi; Kennedy Davenport; Latrice Royale; Peppermint; Shangela; Shea Couleé; Trinity the Tuck; Violet Chachki
June 9, 2017	Vienna	Austria	Gasometer	Bianca Del Rio; Michelle Visage; Shangela	Aja; Alaska Thunderfuck; Alyssa Edwards; Derrick Barry; Detox; Kim Chi; Kennedy Davenport; Latrice Royale; Peppermint; Shangela; Shea Couleé; Trinity the Tuck; Violet Chachki
June 10, 2017	Amsterdam	Netherlands	Melkweg	Bianca Del Rio; Michelle Visage; Shangela	Aja; Alaska Thunderfuck; Alyssa Edwards; Derrick Barry; Detox; Kim Chi; Kennedy Davenport; Latrice Royale; Peppermint; Shangela; Shea Couleé; Trinity the Tuck; Violet Chachki
June 11, 2017	Berlin	Germany	Columbiahalle	Bianca Del Rio; Michelle Visage; Shangela	Aja; Alaska Thunderfuck; Alyssa Edwards; Derrick Barry; Detox; Kim Chi; Kennedy Davenport; Latrice Royale; Peppermint; Shangela; Shea Couleé; Trinity the Tuck; Violet Chachki
June 14, 2017	Rotterdam	Netherlands	Club Villa Thalia	Bianca Del Rio; Michelle Visage; Shangela	Aja; Alaska Thunderfuck; Alyssa Edwards; Derrick Barry; Detox; Kim Chi; Kennedy Davenport; Latrice Royale; Peppermint; Shangela; Shea Couleé; Trinity the Tuck; Violet Chachki
June 15, 2017	Antwerp	Belgium	Stadsschouwburg Antwerpen	Bianca Del Rio; Michelle Visage; Shangela	Aja; Alaska Thunderfuck; Alyssa Edwards; Derrick Barry; Detox; Kim Chi; Kennedy Davenport; Latrice Royale; Peppermint; Shangela; Shea Couleé; Trinity the Tuck; Violet Chachki
June 16, 2017	Cologne	Germany	Gloria-Theater	Bianca Del Rio; Michelle Visage; Shangela	Aja; Alaska Thunderfuck; Alyssa Edwards; Derrick Barry; Detox; Kim Chi; Kennedy Davenport; Latrice Royale; Peppermint; Shangela; Shea Couleé; Trinity the Tuck; Violet Chachki
June 17, 2017	Hamburg	Germany	Docks	Bianca Del Rio; Michelle Visage; Shangela	Aja; Alaska Thunderfuck; Alyssa Edwards; Derrick Barry; Detox; Kim Chi; Kennedy Davenport; Latrice Royale; Peppermint; Shangela; Shea Couleé; Trinity the Tuck; Violet Chachki
Leg 3 – North America
October 12, 2017	San Diego	United States	Spreckels Theater Building	Bob the Drag Queen; Shangela	Acid Betty; Alyssa Edwards; Detox; Kim Chi; Latrice Royale; Valentina; Violet Chachki
October 13, 2017	Los Angeles	United States	Globe Theatre	Bob the Drag Queen; Shangela	Acid Betty; Alyssa Edwards; Detox; Kim Chi; Latrice Royale; Valentina; Violet Chachki
October 14, 2017	San Francisco	United States	MEZZANINE	Bob the Drag Queen; Shangela	Acid Betty; Alyssa Edwards; Detox; Kim Chi; Latrice Royale; Valentina; Violet Chachki
October 15, 2017	Portland	United States	Revolution Hall	Bob the Drag Queen; Shangela	Acid Betty; Alyssa Edwards; Detox; Kim Chi; Latrice Royale; Valentina; Violet Chachki
October 18, 2017	Austin	United States	Paramount Theatre	Bob the Drag Queen; Shangela	Acid Betty; Alyssa Edwards; Detox; Kim Chi; Latrice Royale; Valentina; Violet Chachki
October 19, 2017	Dallas	United States	Majestic Theatre	Bob the Drag Queen; Shangela	Acid Betty; Alyssa Edwards; Detox; Kim Chi; Latrice Royale; Valentina; Violet Chachki
October 21, 2017	Orlando	United States	The Plaza Live	Bob the Drag Queen; Shangela	Acid Betty; Alyssa Edwards; Detox; Kim Chi; Latrice Royale; Valentina; Violet Chachki
October 22, 2017	Atlanta	United States	Atlanta Event Center at Opera	Bob the Drag Queen; Shangela	Acid Betty; Alyssa Edwards; Detox; Kim Chi; Latrice Royale; Valentina; Violet Chachki
October 25, 2017	Toronto	Canada	The Danforth Music Hall	Bob the Drag Queen; Shangela	Acid Betty; Alyssa Edwards; Detox; Kim Chi; Latrice Royale; Valentina; Violet Chachki
October 26, 2017	New York City	United States	The Town Hall	Bob the Drag Queen; Shangela	Acid Betty; Alyssa Edwards; Detox; Kim Chi; Latrice Royale; Valentina; Violet Chachki
October 27, 2017	Boston	United States	The Wilbur	Bob the Drag Queen; Shangela	Acid Betty; Alyssa Edwards; Detox; Kim Chi; Latrice Royale; Valentina; Violet Chachki
October 28, 2017	Montreal	Canada	Théâtre Telus	Bob the Drag Queen; Shangela	Acid Betty; Alyssa Edwards; Detox; Kim Chi; Latrice Royale; Valentina; Violet Chachki
October 29, 2017	Chicago	United States	Metro Chicago	Bob the Drag Queen; Shangela	Acid Betty; Alyssa Edwards; Detox; Kim Chi; Latrice Royale; Valentina; Violet Chachki
Leg 4 – Europe
October 31, 2017	Madrid	Spain	Teatro Barceló	Bob the Drag Queen; Shangela	Courtney Act; Derrick Barry; Detox; Farrah Moan; Kennedy Davenport; Kim Chi; Latrice Royale; Milk; Valentina; Willam Belli
November 1, 2017	Barcelona	Spain	Razzmatazz	Bob the Drag Queen; Shangela	Courtney Act; Derrick Barry; Detox; Farrah Moan; Kennedy Davenport; Kim Chi; Latrice Royale; Milk; Valentina; Willam Belli
November 2, 2017	Madrid	Spain	Teatro Barceló	Bob the Drag Queen; Shangela	Courtney Act; Derrick Barry; Detox; Farrah Moan; Kennedy Davenport; Kim Chi; Latrice Royale; Milk; Valentina; Willam Belli

=== 2018 dates ===
Date	City	Country	Venue	Host	Performers
February 7, 2018 (Note: The Houston show was originally scheduled for October 20th, 2017, but was postponed due to the effects of Hurricane Harvey.)	Houston	United States	Jones Hall	Michelle Visage	Detox; Kim Chi; Latrice Royale; Peppermint; Shangela; Valentina; Violet Chachki
Leg 5 – Latin America
February 9, 2018	Mexico City	Mexico	Auditorio Nacional	Bianca Del Rio; Michelle Visage	Detox; Kennedy Davenport; Kim Chi; Laganja Estranja; Latrice Royale; Peppermint; Shangela; Valentina; Violet Chachki
February 10, 2018	Monterrey	Mexico	Escena Monterrey	Bianca Del Rio; Michelle Visage	Detox; Kennedy Davenport; Kim Chi; Laganja Estranja; Latrice Royale; Peppermint; Shangela; Valentina; Violet Chachki
February 11, 2018	Guadalajara	Mexico	Teatro Diana	Bianca Del Rio; Michelle Visage	Detox; Kennedy Davenport; Kim Chi; Laganja Estranja; Latrice Royale; Peppermint; Shangela; Valentina; Violet Chachki
February 15, 2018	Buenos Aires	Argentina	Teatro Vorterix	Bianca Del Rio; Michelle Visage	Detox; Kennedy Davenport; Kim Chi; Laganja Estranja; Latrice Royale; Peppermint; Shangela; Valentina; Violet Chachki
February 16, 2018	Buenos Aires	Argentina	Teatro Vorterix	Bianca Del Rio; Michelle Visage	Detox; Kennedy Davenport; Kim Chi; Laganja Estranja; Latrice Royale; Peppermint; Shangela; Valentina; Violet Chachki
February 17, 2018	Santiago	Chile	Teatro Cariola	Bianca Del Rio; Michelle Visage	Detox; Kennedy Davenport; Kim Chi; Laganja Estranja; Latrice Royale; Peppermint; Shangela; Valentina; Violet Chachki
February 18, 2018	Lima	Peru	Barranco Arena	Bianca Del Rio; Michelle Visage	Detox; Kennedy Davenport; Kim Chi; Laganja Estranja; Latrice Royale; Peppermint; Shangela; Valentina; Violet Chachki
February 22, 2018	Porto Alegre	Brazil	Teatro do Bourbon Country	Bianca Del Rio; Michelle Visage	Detox; Kennedy Davenport; Kim Chi; Laganja Estranja; Latrice Royale; Peppermint; Shangela; Valentina; Violet Chachki
February 23, 2018	Rio de Janeiro	Brazil	Teatro Bradesco Rio	Bianca Del Rio; Michelle Visage	Detox; Kennedy Davenport; Kim Chi; Laganja Estranja; Latrice Royale; Peppermint; Shangela; Valentina; Violet Chachki
February 24, 2018	São Paulo	Brazil	Teatro Bradesco	Bianca Del Rio; Michelle Visage	Detox; Kennedy Davenport; Kim Chi; Laganja Estranja; Latrice Royale; Peppermint; Shangela; Valentina; Violet Chachki
February 25, 2018	São Paulo	Brazil	Teatro Bradesco	Bianca Del Rio; Michelle Visage	Detox; Kennedy Davenport; Kim Chi; Laganja Estranja; Latrice Royale; Peppermint; Shangela; Valentina; Violet Chachki
Leg 6 – Europe
May 18, 2018	Berlin	Germany	Admiralpalast Berlin	Lady Bunny; Monét X Change; Shangela	Alyssa Edwards; Aquaria; Detox; Kennedy Davenport; Kim Chi; Laganja Estranja; Latrice Royale; Peppermint; Shangela; Sharon Needles; Valentina; Violet Chachki
May 19, 2018	Copenhagen	Denmark	DR Koncerthuset	Lady Bunny; Monét X Change; Shangela	Alyssa Edwards; Aquaria; Detox; Kennedy Davenport; Kim Chi; Laganja Estranja; Latrice Royale; Peppermint; Shangela; Sharon Needles; Valentina; Violet Chachki
May 21, 2018	Hamburg	Germany	Operettenhaus	Lady Bunny; Monét X Change; Shangela	Alyssa Edwards; Aquaria; Detox; Kennedy Davenport; Kim Chi; Laganja Estranja; Latrice Royale; Peppermint; Shangela; Sharon Needles; Valentina; Violet Chachki
May 22, 2018	Cologne	Germany	Gloria-Theatre	Lady Bunny; Monét X Change; Shangela	Alyssa Edwards; Aquaria; Detox; Kennedy Davenport; Kim Chi; Laganja Estranja; Latrice Royale; Peppermint; Shangela; Sharon Needles; Valentina; Violet Chachki
May 24, 2018	Rotterdam	Netherlands	Club Villa Thalia	Lady Bunny; Monét X Change; Shangela	Alyssa Edwards; Aquaria; Detox; Kennedy Davenport; Kim Chi; Laganja Estranja; Latrice Royale; Peppermint; Shangela; Sharon Needles; Valentina; Violet Chachki
May 25, 2018	Amsterdam	Netherlands	Theater Amsterdam	Lady Bunny; Monét X Change; Shangela	Alyssa Edwards; Aquaria; Detox; Kennedy Davenport; Kim Chi; Laganja Estranja; Latrice Royale; Peppermint; Shangela; Sharon Needles; Valentina; Violet Chachki
May 26, 2018	London	England	Troxy	Lady Bunny; Monét X Change; Shangela	Alyssa Edwards; Aquaria; Detox; Kennedy Davenport; Kim Chi; Laganja Estranja; Latrice Royale; Peppermint; Shangela; Sharon Needles; Valentina; Violet Chachki
May 27, 2018	Birmingham	England	Symphony Hall	Lady Bunny; Monét X Change; Shangela	Alyssa Edwards; Aquaria; Detox; Kennedy Davenport; Kim Chi; Laganja Estranja; Latrice Royale; Peppermint; Shangela; Sharon Needles; Valentina; Violet Chachki
May 29, 2018	Cardiff	Wales	St David's Hall	Lady Bunny; Monét X Change; Shangela	Alyssa Edwards; Aquaria; Detox; Kennedy Davenport; Kim Chi; Laganja Estranja; Latrice Royale; Peppermint; Shangela; Sharon Needles; Valentina; Violet Chachki
May 30, 2018	Manchester	England	Palace Theatre	Lady Bunny; Monét X Change; Shangela	Alyssa Edwards; Aquaria; Detox; Kennedy Davenport; Kim Chi; Laganja Estranja; Latrice Royale; Peppermint; Shangela; Sharon Needles; Valentina; Violet Chachki
June 1, 2018	Belfast	Northern Ireland	Waterfront Hall	Lady Bunny; Monét X Change; Shangela	Alyssa Edwards; Aquaria; Detox; Kennedy Davenport; Kim Chi; Laganja Estranja; Latrice Royale; Peppermint; Shangela; Sharon Needles; Valentina; Violet Chachki
June 2, 2018	Dublin	Ireland	3Olympia Theatre	Lady Bunny; Monét X Change; Shangela	Alyssa Edwards; Aquaria; Detox; Kennedy Davenport; Kim Chi; Laganja Estranja; Latrice Royale; Peppermint; Shangela; Sharon Needles; Valentina; Violet Chachki
June 3, 2018	Glasgow	Scotland	SEC Armadillo	Lady Bunny; Monét X Change; Shangela	Alyssa Edwards; Aquaria; Detox; Kennedy Davenport; Kim Chi; Laganja Estranja; Latrice Royale; Peppermint; Shangela; Sharon Needles; Valentina; Violet Chachki
June 4, 2018	London	England	Troxy	Lady Bunny; Monét X Change; Shangela	Alyssa Edwards; Aquaria; Detox; Kennedy Davenport; Kim Chi; Laganja Estranja; Latrice Royale; Peppermint; Shangela; Sharon Needles; Valentina; Violet Chachki
June 6, 2018	Paris	France	Salle Wagram	Lady Bunny; Monét X Change; Shangela	Alyssa Edwards; Aquaria; Detox; Kennedy Davenport; Kim Chi; Laganja Estranja; Latrice Royale; Peppermint; Shangela; Sharon Needles; Valentina; Violet Chachki
June 7, 2018	Antwerp	Belgium	Stadsschouwburg	Lady Bunny; Monét X Change; Shangela	Alyssa Edwards; Aquaria; Detox; Kennedy Davenport; Kim Chi; Laganja Estranja; Latrice Royale; Peppermint; Shangela; Sharon Needles; Valentina; Violet Chachki
June 8, 2018	Barcelona	Spain	Razzmatazz	Lady Bunny; Monét X Change; Shangela	Alyssa Edwards; Aquaria; Detox; Kennedy Davenport; Kim Chi; Laganja Estranja; Latrice Royale; Peppermint; Shangela; Sharon Needles; Valentina; Violet Chachki
June 9, 2018	Madrid	Spain	Sala La Riviera	Lady Bunny; Monét X Change; Shangela	Alyssa Edwards; Aquaria; Detox; Kennedy Davenport; Kim Chi; Laganja Estranja; Latrice Royale; Peppermint; Shangela; Sharon Needles; Valentina; Violet Chachki
June 14, 2018	Stockholm	Sweden	Gota Lejon	Lady Bunny; Monét X Change; Shangela	Alyssa Edwards; Aquaria; Detox; Kennedy Davenport; Kim Chi; Laganja Estranja; Latrice Royale; Peppermint; Shangela; Sharon Needles; Valentina; Violet Chachki
June 15, 2018	Stockholm	Sweden	Gota Lejon	Lady Bunny; Monét X Change; Shangela	Alyssa Edwards; Aquaria; Detox; Kennedy Davenport; Kim Chi; Laganja Estranja; Latrice Royale; Peppermint; Shangela; Sharon Needles; Valentina; Violet Chachki
June 16, 2018	Oslo	Norway	Folketeateret	Lady Bunny; Monét X Change; Shangela	Alyssa Edwards; Aquaria; Detox; Kennedy Davenport; Kim Chi; Laganja Estranja; Latrice Royale; Peppermint; Shangela; Sharon Needles; Valentina; Violet Chachki
June 17, 2018	Helsinki	Finland	Finlandia Hall	Lady Bunny; Monét X Change; Shangela	Alyssa Edwards; Aquaria; Detox; Kennedy Davenport; Kim Chi; Laganja Estranja; Latrice Royale; Peppermint; Shangela; Sharon Needles; Valentina; Violet Chachki
June 18, 2018	Helsinki	Finland	Finlandia Hall	Lady Bunny; Monét X Change; Shangela	Alyssa Edwards; Aquaria; Detox; Kennedy Davenport; Kim Chi; Laganja Estranja; Latrice Royale; Peppermint; Shangela; Sharon Needles; Valentina; Violet Chachki
Leg 7 – North America
September 5, 2018	New York City	United States	The Town Hall	Asia O'Hara; Bianca Del Rio; Bob the Drag Queen	Acid Betty; Aquaria; Asia O'Hara; Detox; Eureka O'Hara; Kameron Michaels; Kennedy Davenport; Kim Chi; Mayhem Miller; Valentina; Violet Chachki
September 6, 2018	Boston	United States	Boch Center	Asia O'Hara; Bianca Del Rio; Bob the Drag Queen	Acid Betty; Aquaria; Asia O'Hara; Detox; Eureka O'Hara; Kameron Michaels; Kennedy Davenport; Kim Chi; Mayhem Miller; Valentina; Violet Chachki
September 7, 2018	Montreal	Canada	L'Olympia Montreal	Asia O'Hara; Bianca Del Rio; Bob the Drag Queen	Acid Betty; Aquaria; Asia O'Hara; Detox; Eureka O'Hara; Kameron Michaels; Kennedy Davenport; Kim Chi; Mayhem Miller; Valentina; Violet Chachki
September 8, 2018	Toronto	Canada	Danforth Music Hall	Asia O'Hara; Bianca Del Rio; Bob the Drag Queen	Acid Betty; Aquaria; Asia O'Hara; Detox; Eureka O'Hara; Kameron Michaels; Kennedy Davenport; Kim Chi; Mayhem Miller; Valentina; Violet Chachki
September 9, 2018	Buffalo	United States	Center for the Arts	Asia O'Hara; Bianca Del Rio; Bob the Drag Queen	Acid Betty; Aquaria; Asia O'Hara; Detox; Eureka O'Hara; Kameron Michaels; Kennedy Davenport; Kim Chi; Mayhem Miller; Valentina; Violet Chachki
September 12, 2018	Detroit	United States	MotorCity Casino Hotel	Asia O'Hara; Bianca Del Rio; Bob the Drag Queen	Acid Betty; Aquaria; Asia O'Hara; Detox; Eureka O'Hara; Kameron Michaels; Kennedy Davenport; Kim Chi; Mayhem Miller; Valentina; Violet Chachki
September 13, 2018	Chicago	United States	Harris Theater	Asia O'Hara; Bianca Del Rio; Bob the Drag Queen	Acid Betty; Aquaria; Asia O'Hara; Detox; Eureka O'Hara; Kameron Michaels; Kennedy Davenport; Kim Chi; Mayhem Miller; Valentina; Violet Chachki
September 14, 2018	St. Louis	United States	The Pageant	Asia O'Hara; Bianca Del Rio; Bob the Drag Queen	Acid Betty; Aquaria; Asia O'Hara; Detox; Eureka O'Hara; Kameron Michaels; Kennedy Davenport; Kim Chi; Mayhem Miller; Valentina; Violet Chachki
September 16, 2018	Milwaukee	United States	Turner Hall	Asia O'Hara; Bianca Del Rio; Bob the Drag Queen	Acid Betty; Aquaria; Asia O'Hara; Detox; Eureka O'Hara; Kameron Michaels; Kennedy Davenport; Kim Chi; Mayhem Miller; Valentina; Violet Chachki
September 19, 2018	Kansas City	United States	Folly Theater	Asia O'Hara; Bianca Del Rio; Bob the Drag Queen	Acid Betty; Aquaria; Asia O'Hara; Detox; Eureka O'Hara; Kameron Michaels; Kennedy Davenport; Kim Chi; Mayhem Miller; Valentina; Violet Chachki
September 20, 2018	Denver	United States	Paramount Theatre	Asia O'Hara; Bianca Del Rio; Bob the Drag Queen	Acid Betty; Aquaria; Asia O'Hara; Detox; Eureka O'Hara; Kameron Michaels; Kennedy Davenport; Kim Chi; Mayhem Miller; Valentina; Violet Chachki
September 22, 2018	Vancouver	Canada	Vogue Theatre	Asia O'Hara; Bianca Del Rio; Bob the Drag Queen	Acid Betty; Aquaria; Asia O'Hara; Detox; Eureka O'Hara; Kameron Michaels; Kennedy Davenport; Kim Chi; Mayhem Miller; Valentina; Violet Chachki
September 23, 2018	Seattle	United States	Paramount Theatre	Asia O'Hara; Bianca Del Rio; Bob the Drag Queen	Acid Betty; Aquaria; Asia O'Hara; Detox; Eureka O'Hara; Kameron Michaels; Kennedy Davenport; Kim Chi; Mayhem Miller; Valentina; Violet Chachki
October 4, 2018	Portland	United States	Arlene Schnitzer Concert Hall	Asia O'Hara; Bianca Del Rio; Bob the Drag Queen	Acid Betty; Aquaria; Asia O'Hara; Detox; Eureka O'Hara; Kameron Michaels; Kennedy Davenport; Kim Chi; Mayhem Miller; Valentina; Violet Chachki
October 5, 2018	San Francisco	United States	Curran Theatre	Asia O'Hara; Bianca Del Rio; Bob the Drag Queen	Acid Betty; Aquaria; Asia O'Hara; Detox; Eureka O'Hara; Kameron Michaels; Kennedy Davenport; Kim Chi; Mayhem Miller; Valentina; Violet Chachki
October 6, 2018	Los Angeles	United States	Orpheum Theatre	Asia O'Hara; Bianca Del Rio; Bob the Drag Queen	Acid Betty; Aquaria; Asia O'Hara; Detox; Eureka O'Hara; Kameron Michaels; Kennedy Davenport; Kim Chi; Mayhem Miller; Valentina; Violet Chachki
October 7, 2018	San Diego	United States	Balboa Theatre	Asia O'Hara; Bianca Del Rio; Bob the Drag Queen	Acid Betty; Aquaria; Asia O'Hara; Detox; Eureka O'Hara; Kameron Michaels; Kennedy Davenport; Kim Chi; Mayhem Miller; Valentina; Violet Chachki
October 9, 2018	Phoenix	United States	Orpheum Theatre	Asia O'Hara; Bianca Del Rio; Bob the Drag Queen	Acid Betty; Aquaria; Asia O'Hara; Detox; Eureka O'Hara; Kameron Michaels; Kennedy Davenport; Kim Chi; Mayhem Miller; Valentina; Violet Chachki
October 11, 2018	Austin	United States	Paramount Theatre	Asia O'Hara; Bianca Del Rio; Bob the Drag Queen	Acid Betty; Aquaria; Asia O'Hara; Detox; Eureka O'Hara; Kameron Michaels; Kennedy Davenport; Kim Chi; Mayhem Miller; Valentina; Violet Chachki
October 12, 2018	New Orleans	United States	Joy Theater	Asia O'Hara; Bianca Del Rio; Bob the Drag Queen	Acid Betty; Aquaria; Asia O'Hara; Detox; Eureka O'Hara; Kameron Michaels; Kennedy Davenport; Kim Chi; Mayhem Miller; Valentina; Violet Chachki
October 13, 2018	Houston	United States	Jones Hall	Asia O'Hara; Bianca Del Rio; Bob the Drag Queen	Acid Betty; Aquaria; Asia O'Hara; Detox; Eureka O'Hara; Kameron Michaels; Kennedy Davenport; Kim Chi; Mayhem Miller; Valentina; Violet Chachki
October 14, 2018	Dallas	United States	Majestic Theatre	Asia O'Hara; Bianca Del Rio; Bob the Drag Queen	Acid Betty; Aquaria; Asia O'Hara; Detox; Eureka O'Hara; Kameron Michaels; Kennedy Davenport; Kim Chi; Mayhem Miller; Valentina; Violet Chachki
October 18, 2018	Cincinnati	United States	Aronoff Center	Asia O'Hara; Bianca Del Rio; Bob the Drag Queen	Acid Betty; Aquaria; Asia O'Hara; Detox; Eureka O'Hara; Kameron Michaels; Kennedy Davenport; Kim Chi; Mayhem Miller; Valentina; Violet Chachki
October 19, 2018	Atlanta	United States	Center Stage	Asia O'Hara; Bianca Del Rio; Bob the Drag Queen	Acid Betty; Aquaria; Asia O'Hara; Detox; Eureka O'Hara; Kameron Michaels; Kennedy Davenport; Kim Chi; Mayhem Miller; Valentina; Violet Chachki
October 20, 2018	Richmond	United States	National Theater	Asia O'Hara; Bianca Del Rio; Bob the Drag Queen	Acid Betty; Aquaria; Asia O'Hara; Detox; Eureka O'Hara; Kameron Michaels; Kennedy Davenport; Kim Chi; Mayhem Miller; Valentina; Violet Chachki
October 23, 2018	Washington, D.C.	United States	Lincoln Theatre	Asia O'Hara; Bianca Del Rio; Bob the Drag Queen	Acid Betty; Aquaria; Asia O'Hara; Detox; Eureka O'Hara; Kameron Michaels; Kennedy Davenport; Kim Chi; Mayhem Miller; Valentina; Violet Chachki
October 24, 2018	Charlotte	United States	Levine Center for the Arts	Asia O'Hara; Bianca Del Rio; Bob the Drag Queen	Acid Betty; Aquaria; Asia O'Hara; Detox; Eureka O'Hara; Kameron Michaels; Kennedy Davenport; Kim Chi; Mayhem Miller; Valentina; Violet Chachki
October 26, 2018	Orlando	United States	The Plaza Live	Asia O'Hara; Bianca Del Rio; Bob the Drag Queen	Acid Betty; Aquaria; Asia O'Hara; Detox; Eureka O'Hara; Kameron Michaels; Kennedy Davenport; Kim Chi; Mayhem Miller; Valentina; Violet Chachki
October 27, 2018	Miami	United States	Olympia Theater	Asia O'Hara; Bianca Del Rio; Bob the Drag Queen	Acid Betty; Aquaria; Asia O'Hara; Detox; Eureka O'Hara; Kameron Michaels; Kennedy Davenport; Kim Chi; Mayhem Miller; Valentina; Violet Chachki

=== 2019 dates ===
Date	City	Country	Venue	Host	Performers
Leg 8 – Asia
February 1, 2019	Hong Kong		Hong Kong Academy for Performing Arts	Asia O'Hara	Detox; Eureka O'Hara; Kameron Michaels; Kim Chi; Naomi Smalls; Violet Chachki
February 2, 2019	Singapore		Kallang Theatre	Asia O'Hara	Detox; Eureka O'Hara; Kameron Michaels; Kim Chi; Naomi Smalls; Violet Chachki
Leg 9 – Oceania
February 4, 2019	Canberra	Australia	Canberra Theatre Centre	Asia O'Hara	Detox; Eureka O'Hara; Kameron Michaels; Kim Chi; Naomi Smalls; Violet Chachki
February 6, 2019	Brisbane	Australia	Queensland Performing Arts Centre	Asia O'Hara	Detox; Eureka O'Hara; Kameron Michaels; Kim Chi; Naomi Smalls; Violet Chachki
February 8, 2019	Melbourne	Australia	Palais Theatre	Asia O'Hara	Detox; Eureka O'Hara; Kameron Michaels; Kim Chi; Naomi Smalls; Violet Chachki
February 9, 2019	Sydney	Australia	Luna Park Sydney	Asia O'Hara	Detox; Eureka O'Hara; Kameron Michaels; Kim Chi; Naomi Smalls; Violet Chachki
February 10, 2019	Adelaide	Australia	Thebarton Theatre	Asia O'Hara	Detox; Eureka O'Hara; Kameron Michaels; Kim Chi; Naomi Smalls; Violet Chachki
February 13, 2019	Auckland	New Zealand	ASB Showgrounds	Asia O'Hara	Detox; Eureka O'Hara; Kameron Michaels; Kim Chi; Naomi Smalls; Violet Chachki
Leg 10 – Europe
April 1, 2019	Madrid	Spain	Teatro Coliseum	Asia O'Hara; Michelle Visage	Aquaria; Asia O'Hara; Detox; Kameron Michaels; Kim Chi; Monét X Change; Naomi Smalls; Violet Chachki
April 2, 2019	Lisbon	Portugal	Teatro Tivoli BBVA	Asia O'Hara; Michelle Visage	Aquaria; Asia O'Hara; Detox; Kameron Michaels; Kim Chi; Monét X Change; Naomi Smalls; Violet Chachki
April 6, 2019 (Note: Two shows were held in Barcelona on April 6, 2019: one at 4 PM and one at 9 PM local time.)	Barcelona	Spain	Teatre Apolo	Asia O'Hara; Michelle Visage	Aquaria; Asia O'Hara; Detox; Kameron Michaels; Kim Chi; Monét X Change; Naomi Smalls; Violet Chachki
April 8, 2019	Rome	Italy	Teatro Olimpico	Asia O'Hara; Michelle Visage	Aquaria; Asia O'Hara; Detox; Kameron Michaels; Kim Chi; Monét X Change; Naomi Smalls; Violet Chachki
April 9, 2019	Milan	Italy	Teatro Nazionale	Asia O'Hara; Michelle Visage	Aquaria; Asia O'Hara; Detox; Kameron Michaels; Kim Chi; Monét X Change; Naomi Smalls; Violet Chachki
April 10, 2019	Bologna	Italy	Teatro Celebrazioni	Asia O'Hara; Michelle Visage	Aquaria; Asia O'Hara; Detox; Kameron Michaels; Kim Chi; Monét X Change; Naomi Smalls; Violet Chachki
April 11, 2019	Milan	Italy	Teatro Nazionale	Asia O'Hara; Michelle Visage	Aquaria; Asia O'Hara; Detox; Kameron Michaels; Kim Chi; Monét X Change; Naomi Smalls; Violet Chachki
April 13, 2019	Vienna	Austria	Gasometer	Asia O'Hara; Michelle Visage	Aquaria; Asia O'Hara; Detox; Kameron Michaels; Kim Chi; Monét X Change; Naomi Smalls; Violet Chachki
April 14, 2019	Prague	Czech Republic	Prague Congress Centre	Asia O'Hara; Michelle Visage	Aquaria; Asia O'Hara; Detox; Kameron Michaels; Kim Chi; Monét X Change; Naomi Smalls; Violet Chachki
April 17, 2019	Helsinki	Finland	Finlandia Hall	Asia O'Hara; Michelle Visage	Aquaria; Asia O'Hara; Detox; Kameron Michaels; Kim Chi; Monét X Change; Naomi Smalls; Violet Chachki
April 20, 2019	Stockholm	Sweden	Cirkus	Asia O'Hara; Michelle Visage	Aquaria; Asia O'Hara; Detox; Kameron Michaels; Kim Chi; Monét X Change; Naomi Smalls; Violet Chachki
April 24, 2019	Oslo	Norway	Folketeateret	Asia O'Hara; Michelle Visage	Aquaria; Asia O'Hara; Detox; Kameron Michaels; Kim Chi; Monét X Change; Naomi Smalls; Violet Chachki
April 25, 2019	Copenhagen	Denmark	DR Koncerthuset	Asia O'Hara; Michelle Visage	Aquaria; Asia O'Hara; Detox; Kameron Michaels; Kim Chi; Monét X Change; Naomi Smalls; Violet Chachki
April 26, 2019	Hamburg	Germany	Mehr! Theater	Asia O'Hara; Michelle Visage	Aquaria; Asia O'Hara; Detox; Kameron Michaels; Kim Chi; Monét X Change; Naomi Smalls; Violet Chachki
April 28, 2019	Berlin	Germany	Tempodrom	Asia O'Hara; Michelle Visage	Aquaria; Asia O'Hara; Detox; Kameron Michaels; Kim Chi; Monét X Change; Naomi Smalls; Violet Chachki
April 29, 2019	Cologne	Germany	Musical Dome	Asia O'Hara; Michelle Visage	Aquaria; Asia O'Hara; Detox; Kameron Michaels; Kim Chi; Monét X Change; Naomi Smalls; Violet Chachki
April 30, 2019	Cologne	Germany	Musical Dome	Asia O'Hara; Michelle Visage	Aquaria; Asia O'Hara; Detox; Kameron Michaels; Kim Chi; Monét X Change; Naomi Smalls; Violet Chachki
May 1, 2019	Antwerp	Belgium	Stadsschouwburg Antwerpen	Asia O'Hara; Michelle Visage	Aquaria; Asia O'Hara; Detox; Kameron Michaels; Kim Chi; Monét X Change; Naomi Smalls; Violet Chachki
May 2, 2019	Amsterdam	Netherlands	Theater Amsterdam	Asia O'Hara; Michelle Visage	Aquaria; Asia O'Hara; Detox; Kameron Michaels; Kim Chi; Monét X Change; Naomi Smalls; Violet Chachki
May 3, 2019	Birmingham	England	B:Music	Asia O'Hara; Michelle Visage	Aquaria; Asia O'Hara; Detox; Kameron Michaels; Kim Chi; Monét X Change; Naomi Smalls; Violet Chachki
May 5, 2019	Sunderland	England	Sunderland Empire Theatre	Asia O'Hara; Michelle Visage	Aquaria; Asia O'Hara; Detox; Kameron Michaels; Kim Chi; Monét X Change; Naomi Smalls; Violet Chachki
May 6, 2019	Edinburgh	Scotland	Edinburgh Playhouse	Asia O'Hara; Michelle Visage	Aquaria; Asia O'Hara; Detox; Kameron Michaels; Kim Chi; Monét X Change; Naomi Smalls; Violet Chachki
May 7, 2019	Belfast	Northern Ireland	Waterfront Hall	Asia O'Hara; Michelle Visage	Aquaria; Asia O'Hara; Detox; Kameron Michaels; Kim Chi; Monét X Change; Naomi Smalls; Violet Chachki
May 9, 2019	Manchester	England	O_{2} Apollo Manchester	Asia O'Hara; Michelle Visage	Aquaria; Asia O'Hara; Detox; Kameron Michaels; Kim Chi; Monét X Change; Naomi Smalls; Violet Chachki
May 11, 2019	London	England	Wembley Arena	Asia O'Hara; Michelle Visage	Aquaria; Asia O'Hara; Detox; Kameron Michaels; Kim Chi; Monét X Change; Naomi Smalls; Violet Chachki
May 12, 2019	Paris	France	Casino de Paris	Asia O'Hara; Michelle Visage	Aquaria; Asia O'Hara; Detox; Kameron Michaels; Kim Chi; Monét X Change; Naomi Smalls; Violet Chachki
May 13, 2019	Paris	France	Casino de Paris	Asia O'Hara; Michelle Visage	Aquaria; Asia O'Hara; Detox; Kameron Michaels; Kim Chi; Monét X Change; Naomi Smalls; Violet Chachki
May 14, 2019	Paris	France	Casino de Paris	Asia O'Hara; Michelle Visage	Aquaria; Asia O'Hara; Detox; Kameron Michaels; Kim Chi; Monét X Change; Naomi Smalls; Violet Chachki
May 17, 2019	Glasgow	Scotland	SEC Centre	Asia O'Hara; Michelle Visage	Aquaria; Asia O'Hara; Detox; Kameron Michaels; Kim Chi; Monét X Change; Naomi Smalls; Violet Chachki
May 19, 2019	Cardiff	Wales	Wales Millennium Centre	Asia O'Hara; Michelle Visage	Aquaria; Asia O'Hara; Detox; Kameron Michaels; Kim Chi; Monét X Change; Naomi Smalls; Violet Chachki
Leg 11 – North America
September 11, 2019	Kansas City	United States	Midland Theatre	Asia O'Hara	Aquaria; Asia O'Hara; Detox; Kameron Michaels; Kim Chi; Monét X Change; Naomi Smalls; Plastique Tiara; Vanessa Vanjie Mateo; Violet Chachki; Yvie Oddly
September 12, 2019	Oklahoma City	United States	Rose State College	Asia O'Hara	Aquaria; Asia O'Hara; Detox; Kameron Michaels; Kim Chi; Monét X Change; Naomi Smalls; Plastique Tiara; Vanessa Vanjie Mateo; Violet Chachki; Yvie Oddly
September 13, 2019	Albuquerque	United States	Albuquerque Convention Center	Asia O'Hara	Aquaria; Asia O'Hara; Detox; Kameron Michaels; Kim Chi; Monét X Change; Naomi Smalls; Plastique Tiara; Vanessa Vanjie Mateo; Violet Chachki; Yvie Oddly
September 14, 2019	Denver	United States	Ellie Caulkins Opera House	Asia O'Hara	Aquaria; Asia O'Hara; Detox; Kameron Michaels; Kim Chi; Monét X Change; Naomi Smalls; Plastique Tiara; Vanessa Vanjie Mateo; Violet Chachki; Yvie Oddly
September 16, 2019	Phoenix	United States	Orpheum Theatre Phoenix	Asia O'Hara	Aquaria; Asia O'Hara; Detox; Kameron Michaels; Kim Chi; Monét X Change; Naomi Smalls; Plastique Tiara; Vanessa Vanjie Mateo; Violet Chachki; Yvie Oddly
September 17, 2019	San Diego	United States	Balboa Theatre	Asia O'Hara	Aquaria; Asia O'Hara; Detox; Kameron Michaels; Kim Chi; Monét X Change; Naomi Smalls; Plastique Tiara; Vanessa Vanjie Mateo; Violet Chachki; Yvie Oddly
September 18, 2019	Los Angeles	United States	Orpheum Theatre Los Angeles	Asia O'Hara	Aquaria; Asia O'Hara; Detox; Kameron Michaels; Kim Chi; Monét X Change; Naomi Smalls; Plastique Tiara; Vanessa Vanjie Mateo; Violet Chachki; Yvie Oddly
September 19, 2019	Fresno	United States	Warnors Theatre	Asia O'Hara	Aquaria; Asia O'Hara; Detox; Kameron Michaels; Kim Chi; Monét X Change; Naomi Smalls; Plastique Tiara; Vanessa Vanjie Mateo; Violet Chachki; Yvie Oddly
September 20, 2019	Sacramento	United States	Sacramento Convention Center Complex	Asia O'Hara	Aquaria; Asia O'Hara; Detox; Kameron Michaels; Kim Chi; Monét X Change; Naomi Smalls; Plastique Tiara; Vanessa Vanjie Mateo; Violet Chachki; Yvie Oddly
September 21, 2019	San Francisco	United States	Warfield Theatre	Asia O'Hara	Aquaria; Asia O'Hara; Detox; Kameron Michaels; Kim Chi; Monét X Change; Naomi Smalls; Plastique Tiara; Vanessa Vanjie Mateo; Violet Chachki; Yvie Oddly
September 23, 2019	Vancouver	Canada	Orpheum	Asia O'Hara	Aquaria; Asia O'Hara; Detox; Kameron Michaels; Kim Chi; Monét X Change; Naomi Smalls; Plastique Tiara; Vanessa Vanjie Mateo; Violet Chachki; Yvie Oddly
September 24, 2019	Portland	United States	Keller Auditorium	Asia O'Hara	Aquaria; Asia O'Hara; Detox; Kameron Michaels; Kim Chi; Monét X Change; Naomi Smalls; Plastique Tiara; Vanessa Vanjie Mateo; Violet Chachki; Yvie Oddly
September 25, 2019	Seattle	United States	Paramount Theatre Seattle	Asia O'Hara	Aquaria; Asia O'Hara; Detox; Kameron Michaels; Kim Chi; Monét X Change; Naomi Smalls; Plastique Tiara; Vanessa Vanjie Mateo; Violet Chachki; Yvie Oddly
September 26, 2019	Victoria	Canada	Royal Theatre	Asia O'Hara	Aquaria; Asia O'Hara; Detox; Kameron Michaels; Kim Chi; Monét X Change; Naomi Smalls; Plastique Tiara; Vanessa Vanjie Mateo; Violet Chachki; Yvie Oddly
September 27, 2019	Victoria	Canada	Royal Theatre	Asia O'Hara	Aquaria; Asia O'Hara; Detox; Kameron Michaels; Kim Chi; Monét X Change; Naomi Smalls; Plastique Tiara; Vanessa Vanjie Mateo; Violet Chachki; Yvie Oddly
September 29, 2019	Spokane	United States	Fox Theater	Asia O'Hara	Aquaria; Asia O'Hara; Detox; Kameron Michaels; Kim Chi; Monét X Change; Naomi Smalls; Plastique Tiara; Vanessa Vanjie Mateo; Violet Chachki; Yvie Oddly
September 30, 2019	Calgary	Canada	Southern Alberta Jubilee Auditorium	Asia O'Hara	Aquaria; Asia O'Hara; Detox; Kameron Michaels; Kim Chi; Monét X Change; Naomi Smalls; Plastique Tiara; Vanessa Vanjie Mateo; Violet Chachki; Yvie Oddly
October 1, 2019	Edmonton	Canada	Northern Alberta Jubilee Auditorium	Asia O'Hara	Aquaria; Asia O'Hara; Detox; Kameron Michaels; Kim Chi; Monét X Change; Naomi Smalls; Plastique Tiara; Vanessa Vanjie Mateo; Violet Chachki; Yvie Oddly
October 2, 2019	Saskatoon	Canada	TCU Place	Asia O'Hara	Aquaria; Asia O'Hara; Detox; Kameron Michaels; Kim Chi; Monét X Change; Naomi Smalls; Plastique Tiara; Vanessa Vanjie Mateo; Violet Chachki; Yvie Oddly
October 4, 2019	Regina	Canada	Conexus Arts Centre	Asia O'Hara	Aquaria; Asia O'Hara; Detox; Kameron Michaels; Kim Chi; Monét X Change; Naomi Smalls; Plastique Tiara; Vanessa Vanjie Mateo; Violet Chachki; Yvie Oddly
October 6, 2019	Chicago	United States	Chicago Theatre	Asia O'Hara	Aquaria; Asia O'Hara; Detox; Kameron Michaels; Kim Chi; Monét X Change; Naomi Smalls; Plastique Tiara; Vanessa Vanjie Mateo; Violet Chachki; Yvie Oddly
October 10, 2019	St. Louis	United States	The Pageant	Asia O'Hara	Aquaria; Asia O'Hara; Detox; Kameron Michaels; Kim Chi; Monét X Change; Naomi Smalls; Plastique Tiara; Vanessa Vanjie Mateo; Violet Chachki; Yvie Oddly
October 11, 2019	Nashville	United States	James K. Polk Theater	Asia O'Hara	Aquaria; Asia O'Hara; Detox; Kameron Michaels; Kim Chi; Monét X Change; Naomi Smalls; Plastique Tiara; Vanessa Vanjie Mateo; Violet Chachki; Yvie Oddly
October 12, 2019	Pittsburgh	United States	Heinz Hall for the Performing Arts	Asia O'Hara	Aquaria; Asia O'Hara; Detox; Kameron Michaels; Kim Chi; Monét X Change; Naomi Smalls; Plastique Tiara; Vanessa Vanjie Mateo; Violet Chachki; Yvie Oddly
October 13, 2019	Louisville	United States	Palace Theatre	Asia O'Hara	Aquaria; Asia O'Hara; Detox; Kameron Michaels; Kim Chi; Monét X Change; Naomi Smalls; Plastique Tiara; Vanessa Vanjie Mateo; Violet Chachki; Yvie Oddly
October 14, 2019	Cleveland	United States	Agora Theatre and Ballroom	Asia O'Hara	Aquaria; Asia O'Hara; Detox; Kameron Michaels; Kim Chi; Monét X Change; Naomi Smalls; Plastique Tiara; Vanessa Vanjie Mateo; Violet Chachki; Yvie Oddly
October 16, 2019	Buffalo	United States	Center for the Arts	Asia O'Hara	Aquaria; Asia O'Hara; Detox; Kameron Michaels; Kim Chi; Monét X Change; Naomi Smalls; Plastique Tiara; Vanessa Vanjie Mateo; Violet Chachki; Yvie Oddly
October 17, 2019	Toronto	Canada	Meridian Hall	Asia O'Hara	Aquaria; Asia O'Hara; Detox; Kameron Michaels; Kim Chi; Monét X Change; Naomi Smalls; Plastique Tiara; Vanessa Vanjie Mateo; Violet Chachki; Yvie Oddly
October 19, 2019	New York City	United States	Manhattan Center	Asia O'Hara	Aquaria; Asia O'Hara; Detox; Kameron Michaels; Kim Chi; Monét X Change; Naomi Smalls; Plastique Tiara; Vanessa Vanjie Mateo; Violet Chachki; Yvie Oddly
October 20, 2019 (Note: Two shows were held in Montreal on October 20, 2019: one at 4 PM and one at 9 PM local time.)	Montreal	Canada	Théâtre Maisonneuve	Asia O'Hara	Aquaria; Asia O'Hara; Detox; Kameron Michaels; Kim Chi; Monét X Change; Naomi Smalls; Plastique Tiara; Vanessa Vanjie Mateo; Violet Chachki; Yvie Oddly
October 22, 2019	Detroit	United States	MotorCity Casino Hotel	Asia O'Hara	Aquaria; Asia O'Hara; Detox; Kameron Michaels; Kim Chi; Monét X Change; Naomi Smalls; Plastique Tiara; Vanessa Vanjie Mateo; Violet Chachki; Yvie Oddly
October 25, 2019	Mashantucket	United States	Foxwoods Resort Casino	Asia O'Hara	Aquaria; Asia O'Hara; Detox; Kameron Michaels; Kim Chi; Monét X Change; Naomi Smalls; Plastique Tiara; Vanessa Vanjie Mateo; Violet Chachki; Yvie Oddly
October 27, 2019	Washington, D.C.	United States	The Anthem	Asia O'Hara	Aquaria; Asia O'Hara; Detox; Kameron Michaels; Kim Chi; Monét X Change; Naomi Smalls; Plastique Tiara; Vanessa Vanjie Mateo; Violet Chachki; Yvie Oddly
October 28, 2019	Toronto	Canada	Meridian Hall	Asia O'Hara	Aquaria; Asia O'Hara; Detox; Kameron Michaels; Kim Chi; Monét X Change; Naomi Smalls; Plastique Tiara; Vanessa Vanjie Mateo; Violet Chachki; Yvie Oddly
October 29, 2019	Boston	United States	Wang Theatre	Asia O'Hara	Aquaria; Asia O'Hara; Detox; Kameron Michaels; Kim Chi; Monét X Change; Naomi Smalls; Plastique Tiara; Vanessa Vanjie Mateo; Violet Chachki; Yvie Oddly
October 31, 2019	Durham	United States	Durham Performing Arts Center	Asia O'Hara	Aquaria; Asia O'Hara; Detox; Kameron Michaels; Kim Chi; Monét X Change; Naomi Smalls; Plastique Tiara; Vanessa Vanjie Mateo; Violet Chachki; Yvie Oddly
November 1, 2019	Atlanta	United States	Symphony Hall	Asia O'Hara	Aquaria; Asia O'Hara; Detox; Kameron Michaels; Kim Chi; Monét X Change; Naomi Smalls; Plastique Tiara; Vanessa Vanjie Mateo; Violet Chachki; Yvie Oddly
November 2, 2019	Jacksonville	United States	Florida Theatre	Asia O'Hara	Aquaria; Asia O'Hara; Detox; Kameron Michaels; Kim Chi; Monét X Change; Naomi Smalls; Plastique Tiara; Vanessa Vanjie Mateo; Violet Chachki; Yvie Oddly
November 3, 2019	Miami	United States	Olympia Theater Miami	Asia O'Hara	Aquaria; Asia O'Hara; Detox; Kameron Michaels; Kim Chi; Monét X Change; Naomi Smalls; Plastique Tiara; Vanessa Vanjie Mateo; Violet Chachki; Yvie Oddly
November 5, 2019	Orlando	United States	Bob Carr Theater	Asia O'Hara	Aquaria; Asia O'Hara; Detox; Kameron Michaels; Kim Chi; Monét X Change; Naomi Smalls; Plastique Tiara; Vanessa Vanjie Mateo; Violet Chachki; Yvie Oddly
November 7, 2019	New Orleans	United States	Orpheum Theater	Asia O'Hara	Aquaria; Asia O'Hara; Detox; Kameron Michaels; Kim Chi; Monét X Change; Naomi Smalls; Plastique Tiara; Vanessa Vanjie Mateo; Violet Chachki; Yvie Oddly
November 8, 2019	San Antonio	United States	Majestic Theatre	Asia O'Hara	Aquaria; Asia O'Hara; Detox; Kameron Michaels; Kim Chi; Monét X Change; Naomi Smalls; Plastique Tiara; Vanessa Vanjie Mateo; Violet Chachki; Yvie Oddly
November 10, 2019	Houston	United States	Wortham Theater Center	Asia O'Hara	Aquaria; Asia O'Hara; Detox; Kameron Michaels; Kim Chi; Monét X Change; Naomi Smalls; Plastique Tiara; Vanessa Vanjie Mateo; Violet Chachki; Yvie Oddly
November 11, 2019	Dallas	United States	Majestic Theatre	Asia O'Hara	Aquaria; Asia O'Hara; Detox; Kameron Michaels; Kim Chi; Monét X Change; Naomi Smalls; Plastique Tiara; Vanessa Vanjie Mateo; Violet Chachki; Yvie Oddly
November 12, 2019	Austin	United States	Bass Performance Hall	Asia O'Hara	Aquaria; Asia O'Hara; Detox; Kameron Michaels; Kim Chi; Monét X Change; Naomi Smalls; Plastique Tiara; Vanessa Vanjie Mateo; Violet Chachki; Yvie Oddly
Leg 12 – Latin America
November 26, 2019	Mexico City	Mexico	World Trade Center Mexico City	Asia O'Hara	Aquaria; Asia O'Hara; Kameron Michaels; Monét X Change; Naomi Smalls; Plastique Tiara; Violet Chachki; Yvie Oddly

=== 2020 dates ===
Date	City	Country	Venue	Host	Performers
Leg 13 – Australia & New Zealand
February 4, 2020	Perth	Australia	Perth Convention and Exhibition Centre	Monét X Change	Aquaria; Detox; Kim Chi; Monét X Change; Plastique Tiara; Sharon Needles; Violet Chachki
February 6, 2020	Canberra	Australia	Canberra Theatre Center	Monét X Change	Aquaria; Detox; Kim Chi; Monét X Change; Plastique Tiara; Sharon Needles; Violet Chachki
February 8, 2020	Melbourne	Australia	Palais Theatre	Monét X Change	Aquaria; Detox; Kim Chi; Monét X Change; Plastique Tiara; Sharon Needles; Violet Chachki
February 12, 2020	Brisbane	Australia	Queensland Performing Arts Centre	Monét X Change	Aquaria; Detox; Kim Chi; Monét X Change; Plastique Tiara; Sharon Needles; Violet Chachki
February 14, 2020	Sydney	Australia	State Theatre	Monét X Change	Aquaria; Detox; Kim Chi; Monét X Change; Plastique Tiara; Sharon Needles; Violet Chachki
February 16, 2020	Auckland	New Zealand	Aotea Centre	Monét X Change	Aquaria; Detox; Kim Chi; Monét X Change; Plastique Tiara; Sharon Needles; Violet Chachki
February 17, 2020	Wellington	New Zealand	Michael Fowler Centre	Monét X Change	Aquaria; Detox; Kim Chi; Monét X Change; Plastique Tiara; Sharon Needles; Violet Chachki
Leg 14 – Asia
February 19, 2020	Taipei	Taiwan	Taipei International Convention Center	Monét X Change	Aquaria; Kim Chi; Sharon Needles; Plastique Tiara; Detox; Violet Chachki
February 25, 2020	Seoul	South Korea	Yes24 Live Hall	Monét X Change	Aquaria; Kim Chi; Sharon Needles; Plastique Tiara; Detox; Violet Chachki
February 27, 2020	Singapore	Singapore	The Star Theatre	Monét X Change	Aquaria; Kim Chi; Sharon Needles; Plastique Tiara; Detox; Violet Chachki
February 29, 2020	Manila	Philippines	Araneta Coliseum	Monét X Change	Aquaria; Kim Chi; Sharon Needles; Plastique Tiara; Detox; Violet Chachki
March 2, 2020	Tokyo	Japan	DiverCity Tokyo Plaza	Monét X Change	Aquaria; Kim Chi; Sharon Needles; Plastique Tiara; Detox; Violet Chachki

=== 2022 dates ===
Date	City	Country	Venue	Host	Performers
Leg 15 – Europe (Note: Leg 15 was originally scheduled for spring 2020 but was rescheduled due to the COVID-19 pandemic.)
April 23, 2022	Copenhagen	Denmark	K.B. Hallen	Asia O'Hara	Rosé; Lady Camden; Jorgeous; Jaida Essence Hall; Plastique Tiara; Vanessa Vanjie Mateo; Yvie Oddly
April 24, 2022	Copenhagen	Denmark	K.B. Hallen	Asia O'Hara	Rosé; Lady Camden; Jorgeous; Jaida Essence Hall; Plastique Tiara; Vanessa Vanjie Mateo; Yvie Oddly
April 25, 2022	Oslo	Norway	Folketeateret	Asia O'Hara	Rosé; Lady Camden; Jorgeous; Jaida Essence Hall; Plastique Tiara; Vanessa Vanjie Mateo; Yvie Oddly
April 27, 2022	Stockholm	Sweden	Cirkus	Asia O'Hara	Rosé; Lady Camden; Jorgeous; Jaida Essence Hall; Plastique Tiara; Vanessa Vanjie Mateo; Yvie Oddly
April 28, 2022	Stockholm	Sweden	Cirkus	Asia O'Hara	Rosé; Lady Camden; Jorgeous; Jaida Essence Hall; Plastique Tiara; Vanessa Vanjie Mateo; Yvie Oddly
April 30, 2022	Berlin	Germany	Tempodrom	Asia O'Hara	Rosé; Lady Camden; Jorgeous; Jaida Essence Hall; Plastique Tiara; Vanessa Vanjie Mateo; Yvie Oddly
May 1, 2022	Berlin	Germany	Tempodrom	Asia O'Hara	Rosé; Lady Camden; Jorgeous; Jaida Essence Hall; Plastique Tiara; Vanessa Vanjie Mateo; Yvie Oddly
May 2, 2022	Cologne	Germany	Lanxess Arena	Asia O'Hara	Rosé; Lady Camden; Jorgeous; Jaida Essence Hall; Plastique Tiara; Vanessa Vanjie Mateo; Yvie Oddly
May 3, 2022	Hamburg	Germany	Barclaycard Arena	Asia O'Hara	Rosé; Lady Camden; Jorgeous; Jaida Essence Hall; Plastique Tiara; Vanessa Vanjie Mateo; Yvie Oddly
May 6, 2022	Milan	Italy	Teatro degli Arcimboldi	Asia O'Hara	Rosé; Lady Camden; Jorgeous; Jaida Essence Hall; Plastique Tiara; Vanessa Vanjie Mateo; Yvie Oddly
May 8, 2022	Vienna	Austria	Gasometer	Asia O'Hara	Rosé; Lady Camden; Jorgeous; Jaida Essence Hall; Plastique Tiara; Vanessa Vanjie Mateo; Yvie Oddly
May 11, 2022	Marseille	France	CEPAC Silo	Asia O'Hara	Rosé; Lady Camden; Jorgeous; Jaida Essence Hall; Plastique Tiara; Vanessa Vanjie Mateo; Yvie Oddly
May 12, 2022	Lyon	France	Bourse du Travail	Asia O'Hara	Rosé; Lady Camden; Jorgeous; Jaida Essence Hall; Plastique Tiara; Vanessa Vanjie Mateo; Yvie Oddly
May 15, 2022	Paris	France	Zénith Paris	Asia O'Hara	Rosé; Lady Camden; Jorgeous; Jaida Essence Hall; Plastique Tiara; Vanessa Vanjie Mateo; Yvie Oddly
May 16, 2022	Amsterdam	Netherlands	AFAS Live	Asia O'Hara	Rosé; Lady Camden; Jorgeous; Jaida Essence Hall; Plastique Tiara; Vanessa Vanjie Mateo; Yvie Oddly
May 17, 2022	Amsterdam	Netherlands	AFAS Live	Asia O'Hara	Rosé; Lady Camden; Jorgeous; Jaida Essence Hall; Plastique Tiara; Vanessa Vanjie Mateo; Yvie Oddly
May 19, 2022	Manchester	England	Manchester Arena	Asia O'Hara	Rosé; Lady Camden; Jorgeous; Jaida Essence Hall; Plastique Tiara; Vanessa Vanjie Mateo; Yvie Oddly
May 20, 2022	Glasgow	Scotland	OVO Hydro	Asia O'Hara	Rosé; Lady Camden; Jorgeous; Jaida Essence Hall; Plastique Tiara; Vanessa Vanjie Mateo; Yvie Oddly
May 22, 2022	London	England	SSE Arena Wembley	Asia O'Hara	Rosé; Lady Camden; Jorgeous; Jaida Essence Hall; Plastique Tiara; Vanessa Vanjie Mateo; Yvie Oddly
May 23, 2022	Antwerp	Belgium	Stadsschouwburg	Asia O'Hara	Rosé; Lady Camden; Jorgeous; Jaida Essence Hall; Plastique Tiara; Vanessa Vanjie Mateo; Yvie Oddly
May 26, 2022	Dublin	Ireland	3Arena	Asia O'Hara	Rosé; Lady Camden; Jorgeous; Jaida Essence Hall; Plastique Tiara; Vanessa Vanjie Mateo; Yvie Oddly
May 28, 2022	Aberdeen	Scotland	P&J Live	Asia O'Hara	Rosé; Lady Camden; Jorgeous; Jaida Essence Hall; Plastique Tiara; Vanessa Vanjie Mateo; Yvie Oddly
May 29, 2022	Scarborough	England	Scarborough Open Air Theatre	Asia O'Hara	Rosé; Lady Camden; Jorgeous; Jaida Essence Hall; Plastique Tiara; Vanessa Vanjie Mateo; Yvie Oddly
May 30, 2022	Cardiff	Wales	Cardiff International Arena	Asia O'Hara	Rosé; Lady Camden; Jorgeous; Jaida Essence Hall; Plastique Tiara; Vanessa Vanjie Mateo; Yvie Oddly
May 31, 2022	Brighton	England	Brighton Centre	Asia O'Hara	Rosé; Lady Camden; Jorgeous; Jaida Essence Hall; Plastique Tiara; Vanessa Vanjie Mateo; Yvie Oddly
June 1, 2022	Birmingham	England	Resorts World Arena	Asia O'Hara	Rosé; Lady Camden; Jorgeous; Jaida Essence Hall; Plastique Tiara; Vanessa Vanjie Mateo; Yvie Oddly
June 3, 2022	Barcelona	Spain	Palau Sant Jordi	Asia O'Hara	Rosé; Lady Camden; Jorgeous; Jaida Essence Hall; Plastique Tiara; Vanessa Vanjie Mateo; Yvie Oddly
June 4, 2022	Madrid	Spain	Palacio Vistalegre	Asia O'Hara	Rosé; Lady Camden; Jorgeous; Jaida Essence Hall; Plastique Tiara; Vanessa Vanjie Mateo; Yvie Oddly
Leg 16 – North America
July 8, 2022	Fort Lauderdale	United States	Au-Rene Theater	Asia O'Hara; Jaida Essence Hall	Angeria Paris VanMicheals; Bosco; Daya Betty; DeJa Skye; Jaida Essence Hall; Kameron Michaels; Vanessa Vanjie Mateo; Yvie Oddly; Kim Chi; Lady Camden; Naomi Smalls; Rosé; Willow Pill; Jorgeous
July 9, 2022	Orlando	United States	Hard Rock Cafe at Universal CityWalk	Asia O'Hara; Jaida Essence Hall	Angeria Paris VanMicheals; Bosco; Daya Betty; DeJa Skye; Jaida Essence Hall; Kameron Michaels; Vanessa Vanjie Mateo; Yvie Oddly; Kim Chi; Lady Camden; Naomi Smalls; Rosé; Willow Pill; Jorgeous
July 10, 2022	Tampa	United States	Seminole Hard Rock Hotel and Casino Tampa	Asia O'Hara; Jaida Essence Hall	Angeria Paris VanMicheals; Bosco; Daya Betty; DeJa Skye; Jaida Essence Hall; Kameron Michaels; Vanessa Vanjie Mateo; Yvie Oddly; Kim Chi; Lady Camden; Naomi Smalls; Rosé; Willow Pill; Jorgeous
July 12, 2022	Jacksonville	United States	Florida Theatre	Asia O'Hara; Jaida Essence Hall	Angeria Paris VanMicheals; Bosco; Daya Betty; DeJa Skye; Jaida Essence Hall; Kameron Michaels; Vanessa Vanjie Mateo; Yvie Oddly; Kim Chi; Lady Camden; Naomi Smalls; Rosé; Willow Pill; Jorgeous
July 13, 2022	Atlanta	United States	The Eastern	Asia O'Hara; Jaida Essence Hall	Angeria Paris VanMicheals; Bosco; Daya Betty; DeJa Skye; Jaida Essence Hall; Kameron Michaels; Vanessa Vanjie Mateo; Yvie Oddly; Kim Chi; Lady Camden; Naomi Smalls; Rosé; Willow Pill; Jorgeous
July 15, 2022	New Orleans	United States	Saenger Theatre	Asia O'Hara; Jaida Essence Hall	Angeria Paris VanMicheals; Bosco; Daya Betty; DeJa Skye; Jaida Essence Hall; Kameron Michaels; Vanessa Vanjie Mateo; Yvie Oddly; Kim Chi; Lady Camden; Naomi Smalls; Rosé; Willow Pill; Jorgeous
July 16, 2022	Houston	United States	Smart Financial Centre	Asia O'Hara; Jaida Essence Hall	Angeria Paris VanMicheals; Bosco; Daya Betty; DeJa Skye; Jaida Essence Hall; Kameron Michaels; Vanessa Vanjie Mateo; Yvie Oddly; Kim Chi; Lady Camden; Naomi Smalls; Rosé; Willow Pill; Jorgeous
July 17, 2022	San Antonio	United States	Majestic Theatre	Asia O'Hara; Jaida Essence Hall	Angeria Paris VanMicheals; Bosco; Daya Betty; DeJa Skye; Jaida Essence Hall; Kameron Michaels; Vanessa Vanjie Mateo; Yvie Oddly; Kim Chi; Lady Camden; Naomi Smalls; Rosé; Willow Pill; Jorgeous
July 19, 2022	Austin	United States	Moody Theater	Asia O'Hara; Jaida Essence Hall	Angeria Paris VanMicheals; Bosco; Daya Betty; DeJa Skye; Jaida Essence Hall; Kameron Michaels; Vanessa Vanjie Mateo; Yvie Oddly; Kim Chi; Lady Camden; Naomi Smalls; Rosé; Willow Pill; Jorgeous
July 20, 2022	Dallas	United States	The Theatre at Grand Prairie	Asia O'Hara; Jaida Essence Hall	Angeria Paris VanMicheals; Bosco; Daya Betty; DeJa Skye; Jaida Essence Hall; Kameron Michaels; Vanessa Vanjie Mateo; Yvie Oddly; Kim Chi; Lady Camden; Naomi Smalls; Rosé; Willow Pill; Jorgeous
July 22, 2022	Saint Louis	United States	Fox Theatre	Asia O'Hara; Jaida Essence Hall	Angeria Paris VanMicheals; Bosco; Daya Betty; DeJa Skye; Jaida Essence Hall; Kameron Michaels; Vanessa Vanjie Mateo; Yvie Oddly; Kim Chi; Lady Camden; Naomi Smalls; Rosé; Willow Pill; Jorgeous
July 23, 2022	Chicago	United States	Rosemont Theatre	Asia O'Hara; Jaida Essence Hall	Angeria Paris VanMicheals; Bosco; Daya Betty; DeJa Skye; Jaida Essence Hall; Kameron Michaels; Vanessa Vanjie Mateo; Yvie Oddly; Kim Chi; Lady Camden; Naomi Smalls; Rosé; Willow Pill; Jorgeous
July 24, 2022	Madison	United States	The Sylvee	Asia O'Hara; Jaida Essence Hall	Angeria Paris VanMicheals; Bosco; Daya Betty; DeJa Skye; Jaida Essence Hall; Kameron Michaels; Vanessa Vanjie Mateo; Yvie Oddly; Kim Chi; Lady Camden; Naomi Smalls; Rosé; Willow Pill; Jorgeous
July 26, 2022	Milwaukee	United States	Riverside Theater	Asia O'Hara; Jaida Essence Hall	Angeria Paris VanMicheals; Bosco; Daya Betty; DeJa Skye; Jaida Essence Hall; Kameron Michaels; Vanessa Vanjie Mateo; Yvie Oddly; Kim Chi; Lady Camden; Naomi Smalls; Rosé; Willow Pill; Jorgeous
July 28, 2022	New York City	United States	Radio City Music Hall	Asia O'Hara; Jaida Essence Hall	Angeria Paris VanMicheals; Bosco; Daya Betty; DeJa Skye; Jaida Essence Hall; Kameron Michaels; Vanessa Vanjie Mateo; Yvie Oddly; Kim Chi; Lady Camden; Naomi Smalls; Rosé; Willow Pill; Jorgeous
July 30, 2022	Detroit	United States	Michigan Lottery Amphitheatre	Asia O'Hara; Jaida Essence Hall	Angeria Paris VanMicheals; Bosco; Daya Betty; DeJa Skye; Jaida Essence Hall; Kameron Michaels; Vanessa Vanjie Mateo; Yvie Oddly; Kim Chi; Lady Camden; Naomi Smalls; Rosé; Willow Pill; Jorgeous
July 31, 2022	Cleveland	United States	Connor Palace	Asia O'Hara; Jaida Essence Hall	Angeria Paris VanMicheals; Bosco; Daya Betty; DeJa Skye; Jaida Essence Hall; Kameron Michaels; Vanessa Vanjie Mateo; Yvie Oddly; Kim Chi; Lady Camden; Naomi Smalls; Rosé; Willow Pill; Jorgeous
August 2, 2022	Baltimore	United States	Pier Six Pavilion	Asia O'Hara; Jaida Essence Hall	Angeria Paris VanMicheals; Bosco; Daya Betty; DeJa Skye; Jaida Essence Hall; Kameron Michaels; Vanessa Vanjie Mateo; Yvie Oddly; Kim Chi; Lady Camden; Naomi Smalls; Rosé; Willow Pill; Jorgeous
August 3, 2022	Raleigh	United States	Red Hat Amphitheater	Asia O'Hara; Jaida Essence Hall	Angeria Paris VanMicheals; Bosco; Daya Betty; DeJa Skye; Jaida Essence Hall; Kameron Michaels; Vanessa Vanjie Mateo; Yvie Oddly; Kim Chi; Lady Camden; Naomi Smalls; Rosé; Willow Pill; Jorgeous
August 5, 2022	Philadelphia	United States	The Met Philadelphia	Asia O'Hara; Jaida Essence Hall	Angeria Paris VanMicheals; Bosco; Daya Betty; DeJa Skye; Jaida Essence Hall; Kameron Michaels; Vanessa Vanjie Mateo; Yvie Oddly; Kim Chi; Lady Camden; Naomi Smalls; Rosé; Willow Pill; Jorgeous
August 6, 2022	Washington D.C.	United States	MGM National Harbor	Asia O'Hara; Jaida Essence Hall	Angeria Paris VanMicheals; Bosco; Daya Betty; DeJa Skye; Jaida Essence Hall; Kameron Michaels; Vanessa Vanjie Mateo; Yvie Oddly; Kim Chi; Lady Camden; Naomi Smalls; Rosé; Willow Pill; Jorgeous
August 7, 2022	Boston	United States	House of Blues	Asia O'Hara; Jaida Essence Hall	Angeria Paris VanMicheals; Bosco; Daya Betty; DeJa Skye; Jaida Essence Hall; Kameron Michaels; Vanessa Vanjie Mateo; Yvie Oddly; Kim Chi; Lady Camden; Naomi Smalls; Rosé; Willow Pill; Jorgeous
August 9, 2022	Nashville	United States	Ryman Auditorium	Asia O'Hara; Jaida Essence Hall	Angeria Paris VanMicheals; Bosco; Daya Betty; DeJa Skye; Jaida Essence Hall; Kameron Michaels; Vanessa Vanjie Mateo; Yvie Oddly; Kim Chi; Lady Camden; Naomi Smalls; Rosé; Willow Pill; Jorgeous
August 10, 2022	Cincinnati	United States	Andrew J. Brady Music Center	Asia O'Hara; Jaida Essence Hall	Angeria Paris VanMicheals; Bosco; Daya Betty; DeJa Skye; Jaida Essence Hall; Kameron Michaels; Vanessa Vanjie Mateo; Yvie Oddly; Kim Chi; Lady Camden; Naomi Smalls; Rosé; Willow Pill; Jorgeous
August 11, 2022	Indianapolis	United States	Old National Centre	Asia O'Hara; Jaida Essence Hall	Angeria Paris VanMicheals; Bosco; Daya Betty; DeJa Skye; Jaida Essence Hall; Kameron Michaels; Vanessa Vanjie Mateo; Yvie Oddly; Kim Chi; Lady Camden; Naomi Smalls; Rosé; Willow Pill; Jorgeous
August 12, 2022	Gary	United States	Hard Rock Live Northern Indiana	Asia O'Hara; Jaida Essence Hall	Angeria Paris VanMicheals; Bosco; Daya Betty; DeJa Skye; Jaida Essence Hall; Kameron Michaels; Vanessa Vanjie Mateo; Yvie Oddly; Kim Chi; Lady Camden; Naomi Smalls; Rosé; Willow Pill; Jorgeous
August 13, 2022	Louisville	United States	Iroquois Park	Asia O'Hara; Jaida Essence Hall	Angeria Paris VanMicheals; Bosco; Daya Betty; DeJa Skye; Jaida Essence Hall; Kameron Michaels; Vanessa Vanjie Mateo; Yvie Oddly; Kim Chi; Lady Camden; Naomi Smalls; Rosé; Willow Pill; Jorgeous
August 14, 2022	Kansas City	United States	Uptown Theater	Asia O'Hara; Jaida Essence Hall	Angeria Paris VanMicheals; Bosco; Daya Betty; DeJa Skye; Jaida Essence Hall; Kameron Michaels; Vanessa Vanjie Mateo; Yvie Oddly; Kim Chi; Lady Camden; Naomi Smalls; Rosé; Willow Pill; Jorgeous
August 17, 2022	Hamilton	Canada	FirstOntario Concert Hall	Asia O'Hara; Jaida Essence Hall	Angeria Paris VanMicheals; Bosco; Daya Betty; DeJa Skye; Jaida Essence Hall; Kameron Michaels; Vanessa Vanjie Mateo; Yvie Oddly; Kim Chi; Lady Camden; Naomi Smalls; Rosé; Willow Pill; Jorgeous
August 18, 2022	Toronto	Canada	Meridian Hall	Asia O'Hara; Jaida Essence Hall	Angeria Paris VanMicheals; Bosco; Daya Betty; DeJa Skye; Jaida Essence Hall; Kameron Michaels; Vanessa Vanjie Mateo; Yvie Oddly; Kim Chi; Lady Camden; Naomi Smalls; Rosé; Willow Pill; Jorgeous
August 19, 2022	Toronto	Canada	Meridian Hall	Asia O'Hara; Jaida Essence Hall	Angeria Paris VanMicheals; Bosco; Daya Betty; DeJa Skye; Jaida Essence Hall; Kameron Michaels; Vanessa Vanjie Mateo; Yvie Oddly; Kim Chi; Lady Camden; Naomi Smalls; Rosé; Willow Pill; Jorgeous
August 20, 2022	London	Canada	Budweiser Gardens	Asia O'Hara; Jaida Essence Hall	Angeria Paris VanMicheals; Bosco; Daya Betty; DeJa Skye; Jaida Essence Hall; Kameron Michaels; Vanessa Vanjie Mateo; Yvie Oddly; Kim Chi; Lady Camden; Naomi Smalls; Rosé; Willow Pill; Jorgeous
August 21, 2022	Ottawa	Canada	National Arts Centre	Asia O'Hara; Jaida Essence Hall	Angeria Paris VanMicheals; Bosco; Daya Betty; DeJa Skye; Jaida Essence Hall; Kameron Michaels; Vanessa Vanjie Mateo; Yvie Oddly; Kim Chi; Lady Camden; Naomi Smalls; Rosé; Willow Pill; Jorgeous
August 22, 2022	Montreal	Canada	Salle Wilfrid-Pelletier	Asia O'Hara; Jaida Essence Hall	Angeria Paris VanMicheals; Bosco; Daya Betty; DeJa Skye; Jaida Essence Hall; Kameron Michaels; Vanessa Vanjie Mateo; Yvie Oddly; Kim Chi; Lady Camden; Naomi Smalls; Rosé; Willow Pill; Jorgeous
August 23, 2022	Montreal	Canada	Salle Wilfrid-Pelletier	Asia O'Hara; Jaida Essence Hall	Angeria Paris VanMicheals; Bosco; Daya Betty; DeJa Skye; Jaida Essence Hall; Kameron Michaels; Vanessa Vanjie Mateo; Yvie Oddly; Kim Chi; Lady Camden; Naomi Smalls; Rosé; Willow Pill; Jorgeous
August 26, 2022	Winnipeg	Canada	Centennial Concert Hall	Asia O'Hara; Jaida Essence Hall	Angeria Paris VanMicheals; Bosco; Daya Betty; DeJa Skye; Jaida Essence Hall; Kameron Michaels; Vanessa Vanjie Mateo; Yvie Oddly; Kim Chi; Lady Camden; Naomi Smalls; Rosé; Willow Pill; Jorgeous
August 27, 2022	Saskatoon	Canada	TCU Place	Asia O'Hara; Jaida Essence Hall	Angeria Paris VanMicheals; Bosco; Daya Betty; DeJa Skye; Jaida Essence Hall; Kameron Michaels; Vanessa Vanjie Mateo; Yvie Oddly; Kim Chi; Lady Camden; Naomi Smalls; Rosé; Willow Pill; Jorgeous
August 28, 2022	Edmonton	Canada	Northern Alberta Jubilee Auditorium	Asia O'Hara; Jaida Essence Hall	Angeria Paris VanMicheals; Bosco; Daya Betty; DeJa Skye; Jaida Essence Hall; Kameron Michaels; Vanessa Vanjie Mateo; Yvie Oddly; Kim Chi; Lady Camden; Naomi Smalls; Rosé; Willow Pill; Jorgeous
August 30, 2022	Regina	Canada	Conexus Arts Centre	Asia O'Hara; Jaida Essence Hall	Angeria Paris VanMicheals; Bosco; Daya Betty; DeJa Skye; Jaida Essence Hall; Kameron Michaels; Vanessa Vanjie Mateo; Yvie Oddly; Kim Chi; Lady Camden; Naomi Smalls; Rosé; Willow Pill; Jorgeous
August 31, 2022	Calgary	Canada	Southern Jubilee Auditorium	Asia O'Hara; Jaida Essence Hall	Angeria Paris VanMicheals; Bosco; Daya Betty; DeJa Skye; Jaida Essence Hall; Kameron Michaels; Vanessa Vanjie Mateo; Yvie Oddly; Kim Chi; Lady Camden; Naomi Smalls; Rosé; Willow Pill; Jorgeous
September 2, 2022	Victoria	Canada	Save-On-Foods Memorial Centre	Asia O'Hara; Jaida Essence Hall	Angeria Paris VanMicheals; Bosco; Daya Betty; DeJa Skye; Jaida Essence Hall; Kameron Michaels; Vanessa Vanjie Mateo; Yvie Oddly; Kim Chi; Lady Camden; Naomi Smalls; Rosé; Willow Pill; Jorgeous
September 4, 2022	Vancouver	Canada	Queen Elizabeth Theatre	Asia O'Hara; Jaida Essence Hall	Angeria Paris VanMicheals; Bosco; Daya Betty; DeJa Skye; Jaida Essence Hall; Kameron Michaels; Vanessa Vanjie Mateo; Yvie Oddly; Kim Chi; Lady Camden; Naomi Smalls; Rosé; Willow Pill; Jorgeous
September 7, 2022	Sacramento	United States	Sacramento Convention Center Complex	Asia O'Hara; Jaida Essence Hall	Angeria Paris VanMicheals; Bosco; Daya Betty; DeJa Skye; Jaida Essence Hall; Kameron Michaels; Vanessa Vanjie Mateo; Yvie Oddly; Kim Chi; Lady Camden; Naomi Smalls; Rosé; Willow Pill; Jorgeous
September 8, 2022	San Francisco	United States	SF Masonic Auditorium	Asia O'Hara; Jaida Essence Hall	Angeria Paris VanMicheals; Bosco; Daya Betty; DeJa Skye; Jaida Essence Hall; Kameron Michaels; Vanessa Vanjie Mateo; Yvie Oddly; Kim Chi; Lady Camden; Naomi Smalls; Rosé; Willow Pill; Jorgeous
September 9, 2022	Oakland	United States	Paramount Theatre	Asia O'Hara; Jaida Essence Hall	Angeria Paris VanMicheals; Bosco; Daya Betty; DeJa Skye; Jaida Essence Hall; Kameron Michaels; Vanessa Vanjie Mateo; Yvie Oddly; Kim Chi; Lady Camden; Naomi Smalls; Rosé; Willow Pill; Jorgeous
September 10, 2022	Reno	United States	Silver Legacy Resort & Casino	Asia O'Hara; Jaida Essence Hall	Angeria Paris VanMicheals; Bosco; Daya Betty; DeJa Skye; Jaida Essence Hall; Kameron Michaels; Vanessa Vanjie Mateo; Yvie Oddly; Kim Chi; Lady Camden; Naomi Smalls; Rosé; Willow Pill; Jorgeous
September 11, 2022	Portland	United States	Keller Auditorium	Asia O'Hara; Jaida Essence Hall	Angeria Paris VanMicheals; Bosco; Daya Betty; DeJa Skye; Jaida Essence Hall; Kameron Michaels; Vanessa Vanjie Mateo; Yvie Oddly; Kim Chi; Lady Camden; Naomi Smalls; Rosé; Willow Pill; Jorgeous
September 14, 2022	Seattle	United States	Paramount Theatre Seattle	Asia O'Hara; Jaida Essence Hall	Angeria Paris VanMicheals; Bosco; Daya Betty; DeJa Skye; Jaida Essence Hall; Kameron Michaels; Vanessa Vanjie Mateo; Yvie Oddly; Kim Chi; Lady Camden; Naomi Smalls; Rosé; Willow Pill; Jorgeous
September 16, 2022	Los Angeles	United States	Shrine Auditorium	Asia O'Hara; Jaida Essence Hall	Angeria Paris VanMicheals; Bosco; Daya Betty; DeJa Skye; Jaida Essence Hall; Kameron Michaels; Vanessa Vanjie Mateo; Yvie Oddly; Kim Chi; Lady Camden; Naomi Smalls; Rosé; Willow Pill; Jorgeous
September 17, 2022	San Diego	United States	Humphrey's	Asia O'Hara; Jaida Essence Hall	Angeria Paris VanMicheals; Bosco; Daya Betty; DeJa Skye; Jaida Essence Hall; Kameron Michaels; Vanessa Vanjie Mateo; Yvie Oddly; Kim Chi; Lady Camden; Naomi Smalls; Rosé; Willow Pill; Jorgeous
September 18, 2022	Phoenix	United States	Arizona Federal Theatre	Asia O'Hara; Jaida Essence Hall	Angeria Paris VanMicheals; Bosco; Daya Betty; DeJa Skye; Jaida Essence Hall; Kameron Michaels; Vanessa Vanjie Mateo; Yvie Oddly; Kim Chi; Lady Camden; Naomi Smalls; Rosé; Willow Pill; Jorgeous
September 23, 2022	Albuquerque	United States	Albuquerque Convention Center	Asia O'Hara; Jaida Essence Hall	Angeria Paris VanMicheals; Bosco; Daya Betty; DeJa Skye; Jaida Essence Hall; Kameron Michaels; Vanessa Vanjie Mateo; Yvie Oddly; Kim Chi; Lady Camden; Naomi Smalls; Rosé; Willow Pill; Jorgeous
September 24, 2022	Denver	United States	Ellie Caulkins Opera House	Asia O'Hara; Jaida Essence Hall	Angeria Paris VanMicheals; Bosco; Daya Betty; DeJa Skye; Jaida Essence Hall; Kameron Michaels; Vanessa Vanjie Mateo; Yvie Oddly; Kim Chi; Lady Camden; Naomi Smalls; Rosé; Willow Pill; Jorgeous
September 25, 2022	Denver	United States	Ellie Caulkins Opera House	Asia O'Hara; Jaida Essence Hall	Angeria Paris VanMicheals; Bosco; Daya Betty; DeJa Skye; Jaida Essence Hall; Kameron Michaels; Vanessa Vanjie Mateo; Yvie Oddly; Kim Chi; Lady Camden; Naomi Smalls; Rosé; Willow Pill; Jorgeous

=== 2023 dates ===
Date	City	Country	Venue	Host	Performers
Leg 17 – North America
June 17, 2023	Atlantic City	United States	Tropicana Casino & Resort	Asia O'Hara; Jaida Essence Hall	Angeria Paris VanMicheals; Aquaria; Bosco; Daya Betty; DeJa Skye; Ginger Minj; Jorgeous; Kahanna Montrese; Kandy Muse; Kim Chi; Lady Camden; Laganja Estranja; Mistress Isabelle Brooks; Naomi Smalls; Plastique Tiara; Rosé; Sasha Colby; Vanessa Vanjie Mateo
June 18, 2023	Durham	United States	Durham Performing Arts Center	Asia O'Hara; Jaida Essence Hall	Angeria Paris VanMicheals; Aquaria; Bosco; Daya Betty; DeJa Skye; Ginger Minj; Jorgeous; Kahanna Montrese; Kandy Muse; Kim Chi; Lady Camden; Laganja Estranja; Mistress Isabelle Brooks; Naomi Smalls; Plastique Tiara; Rosé; Sasha Colby; Vanessa Vanjie Mateo
June 19, 2023	Richmond	United States	Altria Theater	Asia O'Hara; Jaida Essence Hall	Angeria Paris VanMicheals; Aquaria; Bosco; Daya Betty; DeJa Skye; Ginger Minj; Jorgeous; Kahanna Montrese; Kandy Muse; Kim Chi; Lady Camden; Laganja Estranja; Mistress Isabelle Brooks; Naomi Smalls; Plastique Tiara; Rosé; Sasha Colby; Vanessa Vanjie Mateo
June 20, 2023	Charlotte	United States	Ovens Auditorium	Asia O'Hara; Jaida Essence Hall	Angeria Paris VanMicheals; Aquaria; Bosco; Daya Betty; DeJa Skye; Ginger Minj; Jorgeous; Kahanna Montrese; Kandy Muse; Kim Chi; Lady Camden; Laganja Estranja; Mistress Isabelle Brooks; Naomi Smalls; Plastique Tiara; Rosé; Sasha Colby; Vanessa Vanjie Mateo
June 22, 2023	North Charleston	United States	North Charleston Performing Arts Center	Asia O'Hara; Jaida Essence Hall	Angeria Paris VanMicheals; Aquaria; Bosco; Daya Betty; DeJa Skye; Ginger Minj; Jorgeous; Kahanna Montrese; Kandy Muse; Kim Chi; Lady Camden; Laganja Estranja; Mistress Isabelle Brooks; Naomi Smalls; Plastique Tiara; Rosé; Sasha Colby; Vanessa Vanjie Mateo
June 23, 2023	Clearwater	United States	Ruth Eckerd Hall	Asia O'Hara; Jaida Essence Hall	Angeria Paris VanMicheals; Aquaria; Bosco; Daya Betty; DeJa Skye; Ginger Minj; Jorgeous; Kahanna Montrese; Kandy Muse; Kim Chi; Lady Camden; Laganja Estranja; Mistress Isabelle Brooks; Naomi Smalls; Plastique Tiara; Rosé; Sasha Colby; Vanessa Vanjie Mateo
June 24, 2023	Orlando	United States	Walt Disney Theatre	Asia O'Hara; Jaida Essence Hall	Angeria Paris VanMicheals; Aquaria; Bosco; Daya Betty; DeJa Skye; Ginger Minj; Jorgeous; Kahanna Montrese; Kandy Muse; Kim Chi; Lady Camden; Laganja Estranja; Mistress Isabelle Brooks; Naomi Smalls; Plastique Tiara; Rosé; Sasha Colby; Vanessa Vanjie Mateo
June 25, 2023	Fort Lauderdale	United States	Seminole Hard Rock Hotel & Casino Hollywood	Asia O'Hara; Jaida Essence Hall	Angeria Paris VanMicheals; Aquaria; Bosco; Daya Betty; DeJa Skye; Ginger Minj; Jorgeous; Kahanna Montrese; Kandy Muse; Kim Chi; Lady Camden; Laganja Estranja; Mistress Isabelle Brooks; Naomi Smalls; Plastique Tiara; Rosé; Sasha Colby; Vanessa Vanjie Mateo
June 28, 2023	Pensacola	United States	Saenger Theatre	Asia O'Hara; Jaida Essence Hall	Angeria Paris VanMicheals; Aquaria; Bosco; Daya Betty; DeJa Skye; Ginger Minj; Jorgeous; Kahanna Montrese; Kandy Muse; Kim Chi; Lady Camden; Laganja Estranja; Mistress Isabelle Brooks; Naomi Smalls; Plastique Tiara; Rosé; Sasha Colby; Vanessa Vanjie Mateo
June 29, 2023	Huntsville	United States	Von Braun Center	Asia O'Hara; Jaida Essence Hall	Angeria Paris VanMicheals; Aquaria; Bosco; Daya Betty; DeJa Skye; Ginger Minj; Jorgeous; Kahanna Montrese; Kandy Muse; Kim Chi; Lady Camden; Laganja Estranja; Mistress Isabelle Brooks; Naomi Smalls; Plastique Tiara; Rosé; Sasha Colby; Vanessa Vanjie Mateo
June 30, 2023	Atlanta	United States	Cobb Energy Performing Arts Centre	Asia O'Hara; Jaida Essence Hall	Angeria Paris VanMicheals; Aquaria; Bosco; Daya Betty; DeJa Skye; Ginger Minj; Jorgeous; Kahanna Montrese; Kandy Muse; Kim Chi; Lady Camden; Laganja Estranja; Mistress Isabelle Brooks; Naomi Smalls; Plastique Tiara; Rosé; Sasha Colby; Vanessa Vanjie Mateo
July 1, 2023	New Orleans	United States	Mahalia Jackson Theater of the Performing Arts	Asia O'Hara; Jaida Essence Hall	Angeria Paris VanMicheals; Aquaria; Bosco; Daya Betty; DeJa Skye; Ginger Minj; Jorgeous; Kahanna Montrese; Kandy Muse; Kim Chi; Lady Camden; Laganja Estranja; Mistress Isabelle Brooks; Naomi Smalls; Plastique Tiara; Rosé; Sasha Colby; Vanessa Vanjie Mateo
July 2, 2023	Sugar Land	United States	Smart Financial Centre	Asia O'Hara; Jaida Essence Hall	Angeria Paris VanMicheals; Aquaria; Bosco; Daya Betty; DeJa Skye; Ginger Minj; Jorgeous; Kahanna Montrese; Kandy Muse; Kim Chi; Lady Camden; Laganja Estranja; Mistress Isabelle Brooks; Naomi Smalls; Plastique Tiara; Rosé; Sasha Colby; Vanessa Vanjie Mateo
July 5, 2023	San Antonio	United States	Majestic Theatre	Asia O'Hara; Jaida Essence Hall	Angeria Paris VanMicheals; Aquaria; Bosco; Daya Betty; DeJa Skye; Ginger Minj; Jorgeous; Kahanna Montrese; Kandy Muse; Kim Chi; Lady Camden; Laganja Estranja; Mistress Isabelle Brooks; Naomi Smalls; Plastique Tiara; Rosé; Sasha Colby; Vanessa Vanjie Mateo
July 6, 2023	Austin	United States	Moody Theater	Asia O'Hara; Jaida Essence Hall	Angeria Paris VanMicheals; Aquaria; Bosco; Daya Betty; DeJa Skye; Ginger Minj; Jorgeous; Kahanna Montrese; Kandy Muse; Kim Chi; Lady Camden; Laganja Estranja; Mistress Isabelle Brooks; Naomi Smalls; Plastique Tiara; Rosé; Sasha Colby; Vanessa Vanjie Mateo
July 7, 2023	Grand Prairie	United States	The Theatre at Grand Prairie	Asia O'Hara; Jaida Essence Hall	Angeria Paris VanMicheals; Aquaria; Bosco; Daya Betty; DeJa Skye; Ginger Minj; Jorgeous; Kahanna Montrese; Kandy Muse; Kim Chi; Lady Camden; Laganja Estranja; Mistress Isabelle Brooks; Naomi Smalls; Plastique Tiara; Rosé; Sasha Colby; Vanessa Vanjie Mateo
July 8, 2023	Tulsa	United States	Tulsa Theater	Asia O'Hara; Jaida Essence Hall	Angeria Paris VanMicheals; Aquaria; Bosco; Daya Betty; DeJa Skye; Ginger Minj; Jorgeous; Kahanna Montrese; Kandy Muse; Kim Chi; Lady Camden; Laganja Estranja; Mistress Isabelle Brooks; Naomi Smalls; Plastique Tiara; Rosé; Sasha Colby; Vanessa Vanjie Mateo
July 9, 2023	Omaha	United States	Orpheum Theatre	Asia O'Hara; Jaida Essence Hall	Angeria Paris VanMicheals; Aquaria; Bosco; Daya Betty; DeJa Skye; Ginger Minj; Jorgeous; Kahanna Montrese; Kandy Muse; Kim Chi; Lady Camden; Laganja Estranja; Mistress Isabelle Brooks; Naomi Smalls; Plastique Tiara; Rosé; Sasha Colby; Vanessa Vanjie Mateo
July 12, 2023	Denver	United States	Bellco Theatre	Asia O'Hara; Jaida Essence Hall	Angeria Paris VanMicheals; Aquaria; Bosco; Daya Betty; DeJa Skye; Ginger Minj; Jorgeous; Kahanna Montrese; Kandy Muse; Kim Chi; Lady Camden; Laganja Estranja; Mistress Isabelle Brooks; Naomi Smalls; Plastique Tiara; Rosé; Sasha Colby; Vanessa Vanjie Mateo
July 13, 2023	Rio Rancho	United States	Rio Rancho Events Center	Asia O'Hara; Jaida Essence Hall	Angeria Paris VanMicheals; Aquaria; Bosco; Daya Betty; DeJa Skye; Ginger Minj; Jorgeous; Kahanna Montrese; Kandy Muse; Kim Chi; Lady Camden; Laganja Estranja; Mistress Isabelle Brooks; Naomi Smalls; Plastique Tiara; Rosé; Sasha Colby; Vanessa Vanjie Mateo
July 14, 2023	Phoenix	United States	Arizona Financial Theatre	Asia O'Hara; Jaida Essence Hall	Angeria Paris VanMicheals; Aquaria; Bosco; Daya Betty; DeJa Skye; Ginger Minj; Jorgeous; Kahanna Montrese; Kandy Muse; Kim Chi; Lady Camden; Laganja Estranja; Mistress Isabelle Brooks; Naomi Smalls; Plastique Tiara; Rosé; Sasha Colby; Vanessa Vanjie Mateo
July 15, 2023	Rancho Mirage	United States	Agua Caliente Casino	Asia O'Hara; Jaida Essence Hall	Angeria Paris VanMicheals; Aquaria; Bosco; Daya Betty; DeJa Skye; Ginger Minj; Jorgeous; Kahanna Montrese; Kandy Muse; Kim Chi; Lady Camden; Laganja Estranja; Mistress Isabelle Brooks; Naomi Smalls; Plastique Tiara; Rosé; Sasha Colby; Vanessa Vanjie Mateo
July 16, 2023	Los Angeles	United States	Microsoft Theater	Asia O'Hara; Jaida Essence Hall	Angeria Paris VanMicheals; Aquaria; Bosco; Daya Betty; DeJa Skye; Ginger Minj; Jorgeous; Kahanna Montrese; Kandy Muse; Kim Chi; Lady Camden; Laganja Estranja; Mistress Isabelle Brooks; Naomi Smalls; Plastique Tiara; Rosé; Sasha Colby; Vanessa Vanjie Mateo
July 19, 2023	San Francisco	United States	Bill Graham Civic Auditorium	Asia O'Hara; Jaida Essence Hall	Angeria Paris VanMicheals; Aquaria; Bosco; Daya Betty; DeJa Skye; Ginger Minj; Jorgeous; Kahanna Montrese; Kandy Muse; Kim Chi; Lady Camden; Laganja Estranja; Mistress Isabelle Brooks; Naomi Smalls; Plastique Tiara; Rosé; Sasha Colby; Vanessa Vanjie Mateo
July 20, 2023	Wheatland	United States	Hard Rock Hotel & Casino Sacramento	Asia O'Hara; Jaida Essence Hall	Angeria Paris VanMicheals; Aquaria; Bosco; Daya Betty; DeJa Skye; Ginger Minj; Jorgeous; Kahanna Montrese; Kandy Muse; Kim Chi; Lady Camden; Laganja Estranja; Mistress Isabelle Brooks; Naomi Smalls; Plastique Tiara; Rosé; Sasha Colby; Vanessa Vanjie Mateo
July 21, 2023	Eugene	United States	Hult Center for the Performing Arts	Asia O'Hara; Jaida Essence Hall	Angeria Paris VanMicheals; Aquaria; Bosco; Daya Betty; DeJa Skye; Ginger Minj; Jorgeous; Kahanna Montrese; Kandy Muse; Kim Chi; Lady Camden; Laganja Estranja; Mistress Isabelle Brooks; Naomi Smalls; Plastique Tiara; Rosé; Sasha Colby; Vanessa Vanjie Mateo
July 22, 2023	Portland	United States	Keller Auditorium	Asia O'Hara; Jaida Essence Hall	Angeria Paris VanMicheals; Aquaria; Bosco; Daya Betty; DeJa Skye; Ginger Minj; Jorgeous; Kahanna Montrese; Kandy Muse; Kim Chi; Lady Camden; Laganja Estranja; Mistress Isabelle Brooks; Naomi Smalls; Plastique Tiara; Rosé; Sasha Colby; Vanessa Vanjie Mateo
July 23, 2023	Seattle	United States	Marion Oliver McCaw Hall	Asia O'Hara; Jaida Essence Hall	Angeria Paris VanMicheals; Aquaria; Bosco; Daya Betty; DeJa Skye; Ginger Minj; Jorgeous; Kahanna Montrese; Kandy Muse; Kim Chi; Lady Camden; Laganja Estranja; Mistress Isabelle Brooks; Naomi Smalls; Plastique Tiara; Rosé; Sasha Colby; Vanessa Vanjie Mateo
July 27, 2023	Vancouver	Canada	Rogers Arena	Asia O'Hara; Jaida Essence Hall	Angeria Paris VanMicheals; Aquaria; Bosco; Daya Betty; DeJa Skye; Ginger Minj; Jorgeous; Kahanna Montrese; Kandy Muse; Kim Chi; Lady Camden; Laganja Estranja; Mistress Isabelle Brooks; Naomi Smalls; Plastique Tiara; Rosé; Sasha Colby; Vanessa Vanjie Mateo
July 28, 2023	Calgary	Canada	Southern Jubilee Auditorium	Asia O'Hara; Jaida Essence Hall	Angeria Paris VanMicheals; Aquaria; Bosco; Daya Betty; DeJa Skye; Ginger Minj; Jorgeous; Kahanna Montrese; Kandy Muse; Kim Chi; Lady Camden; Laganja Estranja; Mistress Isabelle Brooks; Naomi Smalls; Plastique Tiara; Rosé; Sasha Colby; Vanessa Vanjie Mateo
July 29, 2023	Edmonton	Canada	Northern Alberta Jubilee Auditorium	Asia O'Hara; Jaida Essence Hall	Angeria Paris VanMicheals; Aquaria; Bosco; Daya Betty; DeJa Skye; Ginger Minj; Jorgeous; Kahanna Montrese; Kandy Muse; Kim Chi; Lady Camden; Laganja Estranja; Mistress Isabelle Brooks; Naomi Smalls; Plastique Tiara; Rosé; Sasha Colby; Vanessa Vanjie Mateo
August 1, 2023	Minneapolis	United States	State Theatre	Asia O'Hara; Jaida Essence Hall	Angeria Paris VanMicheals; Aquaria; Bosco; Daya Betty; DeJa Skye; Ginger Minj; Jorgeous; Kahanna Montrese; Kandy Muse; Kim Chi; Lady Camden; Laganja Estranja; Mistress Isabelle Brooks; Naomi Smalls; Plastique Tiara; Rosé; Sasha Colby; Vanessa Vanjie Mateo
August 2, 2023	Milwaukee	United States	Riverside Theater	Asia O'Hara; Jaida Essence Hall	Angeria Paris VanMicheals; Aquaria; Bosco; Daya Betty; DeJa Skye; Ginger Minj; Jorgeous; Kahanna Montrese; Kandy Muse; Kim Chi; Lady Camden; Laganja Estranja; Mistress Isabelle Brooks; Naomi Smalls; Plastique Tiara; Rosé; Sasha Colby; Vanessa Vanjie Mateo
August 3, 2023	Madison	United States	The Sylvee	Asia O'Hara; Jaida Essence Hall	Angeria Paris VanMicheals; Aquaria; Bosco; Daya Betty; DeJa Skye; Ginger Minj; Jorgeous; Kahanna Montrese; Kandy Muse; Kim Chi; Lady Camden; Laganja Estranja; Mistress Isabelle Brooks; Naomi Smalls; Plastique Tiara; Rosé; Sasha Colby; Vanessa Vanjie Mateo
August 4, 2023	Chicago	United States	Rosemont Theatre	Asia O'Hara; Jaida Essence Hall	Angeria Paris VanMicheals; Aquaria; Bosco; Daya Betty; DeJa Skye; Ginger Minj; Jorgeous; Kahanna Montrese; Kandy Muse; Kim Chi; Lady Camden; Laganja Estranja; Mistress Isabelle Brooks; Naomi Smalls; Plastique Tiara; Rosé; Sasha Colby; Vanessa Vanjie Mateo
August 5, 2023	Indianapolis	United States	Murat Theatre	Asia O'Hara; Jaida Essence Hall	Angeria Paris VanMicheals; Aquaria; Bosco; Daya Betty; DeJa Skye; Ginger Minj; Jorgeous; Kahanna Montrese; Kandy Muse; Kim Chi; Lady Camden; Laganja Estranja; Mistress Isabelle Brooks; Naomi Smalls; Plastique Tiara; Rosé; Sasha Colby; Vanessa Vanjie Mateo
August 6, 2023	Windsor	Canada	Caesars Windsor	Asia O'Hara; Jaida Essence Hall	Angeria Paris VanMicheals; Aquaria; Bosco; Daya Betty; DeJa Skye; Ginger Minj; Jorgeous; Kahanna Montrese; Kandy Muse; Kim Chi; Lady Camden; Laganja Estranja; Mistress Isabelle Brooks; Naomi Smalls; Plastique Tiara; Rosé; Sasha Colby; Vanessa Vanjie Mateo
August 8, 2023	Peoria	United States	Peoria Civic Theater	Asia O'Hara; Jaida Essence Hall	Angeria Paris VanMicheals; Aquaria; Bosco; Daya Betty; DeJa Skye; Ginger Minj; Jorgeous; Kahanna Montrese; Kandy Muse; Kim Chi; Lady Camden; Laganja Estranja; Mistress Isabelle Brooks; Naomi Smalls; Plastique Tiara; Rosé; Sasha Colby; Vanessa Vanjie Mateo
August 9, 2023	Kansas City	United States	Kansas City Music Hall	Asia O'Hara; Jaida Essence Hall	Angeria Paris VanMicheals; Aquaria; Bosco; Daya Betty; DeJa Skye; Ginger Minj; Jorgeous; Kahanna Montrese; Kandy Muse; Kim Chi; Lady Camden; Laganja Estranja; Mistress Isabelle Brooks; Naomi Smalls; Plastique Tiara; Rosé; Sasha Colby; Vanessa Vanjie Mateo
August 11, 2023	Louisville	United States	Palace Theatre	Asia O'Hara; Jaida Essence Hall	Angeria Paris VanMicheals; Aquaria; Bosco; Daya Betty; DeJa Skye; Ginger Minj; Jorgeous; Kahanna Montrese; Kandy Muse; Kim Chi; Lady Camden; Laganja Estranja; Mistress Isabelle Brooks; Naomi Smalls; Plastique Tiara; Rosé; Sasha Colby; Vanessa Vanjie Mateo
August 12, 2023	Cleveland	United States	State Theatre	Asia O'Hara; Jaida Essence Hall	Angeria Paris VanMicheals; Aquaria; Bosco; Daya Betty; DeJa Skye; Ginger Minj; Jorgeous; Kahanna Montrese; Kandy Muse; Kim Chi; Lady Camden; Laganja Estranja; Mistress Isabelle Brooks; Naomi Smalls; Plastique Tiara; Rosé; Sasha Colby; Vanessa Vanjie Mateo
August 13, 2023	Buffalo	United States	Shea's Performing Arts Center	Asia O'Hara; Jaida Essence Hall	Angeria Paris VanMicheals; Aquaria; Bosco; Daya Betty; DeJa Skye; Ginger Minj; Jorgeous; Kahanna Montrese; Kandy Muse; Kim Chi; Lady Camden; Laganja Estranja; Mistress Isabelle Brooks; Naomi Smalls; Plastique Tiara; Rosé; Sasha Colby; Vanessa Vanjie Mateo
August 17, 2023	Montreal	Canada	Place Bell	Asia O'Hara; Jaida Essence Hall	Angeria Paris VanMicheals; Aquaria; Bosco; Daya Betty; DeJa Skye; Ginger Minj; Jorgeous; Kahanna Montrese; Kandy Muse; Kim Chi; Lady Camden; Laganja Estranja; Mistress Isabelle Brooks; Naomi Smalls; Plastique Tiara; Rosé; Sasha Colby; Vanessa Vanjie Mateo
August 18, 2023	Ottawa	Canada	TD Place Arena	Asia O'Hara; Jaida Essence Hall	Angeria Paris VanMicheals; Aquaria; Bosco; Daya Betty; DeJa Skye; Ginger Minj; Jorgeous; Kahanna Montrese; Kandy Muse; Kim Chi; Lady Camden; Laganja Estranja; Mistress Isabelle Brooks; Naomi Smalls; Plastique Tiara; Rosé; Sasha Colby; Vanessa Vanjie Mateo
August 19, 2023	London	Canada	Budweiser Gardens	Asia O'Hara; Jaida Essence Hall	Angeria Paris VanMicheals; Aquaria; Bosco; Daya Betty; DeJa Skye; Ginger Minj; Jorgeous; Kahanna Montrese; Kandy Muse; Kim Chi; Lady Camden; Laganja Estranja; Mistress Isabelle Brooks; Naomi Smalls; Plastique Tiara; Rosé; Sasha Colby; Vanessa Vanjie Mateo
August 20, 2023	Toronto	Canada	Scotiabank Arena	Asia O'Hara; Jaida Essence Hall	Angeria Paris VanMicheals; Aquaria; Bosco; Daya Betty; DeJa Skye; Ginger Minj; Jorgeous; Kahanna Montrese; Kandy Muse; Kim Chi; Lady Camden; Laganja Estranja; Mistress Isabelle Brooks; Naomi Smalls; Plastique Tiara; Rosé; Sasha Colby; Vanessa Vanjie Mateo
August 23, 2023	Boston	United States	MGM Music Hall at Fenway	Asia O'Hara; Jaida Essence Hall	Angeria Paris VanMicheals; Aquaria; Bosco; Daya Betty; DeJa Skye; Ginger Minj; Jorgeous; Kahanna Montrese; Kandy Muse; Kim Chi; Lady Camden; Laganja Estranja; Mistress Isabelle Brooks; Naomi Smalls; Plastique Tiara; Rosé; Sasha Colby; Vanessa Vanjie Mateo
August 25, 2023	New York City	United States	Radio City Music Hall	Asia O'Hara; Jaida Essence Hall	Angeria Paris VanMicheals; Aquaria; Bosco; Daya Betty; DeJa Skye; Ginger Minj; Jorgeous; Kahanna Montrese; Kandy Muse; Kim Chi; Lady Camden; Laganja Estranja; Mistress Isabelle Brooks; Naomi Smalls; Plastique Tiara; Rosé; Sasha Colby; Vanessa Vanjie Mateo
August 26, 2023	Washington D.C.	United States	MGM National Harbour	Asia O'Hara; Jaida Essence Hall	Angeria Paris VanMicheals; Aquaria; Bosco; Daya Betty; DeJa Skye; Ginger Minj; Jorgeous; Kahanna Montrese; Kandy Muse; Kim Chi; Lady Camden; Laganja Estranja; Mistress Isabelle Brooks; Naomi Smalls; Plastique Tiara; Rosé; Sasha Colby; Vanessa Vanjie Mateo
Leg 18 – Asia
August 31, 2023	Tokyo	Japan	Tokyo Garden Theatre	Aquaria	Aquaria; Bosco Kahanna Montrese; Kim Chi; Lady Camden; Laganja Estranja; Mistress Isabelle Brooks; Yvie Oddly
~~September 3, 2023~~	~~Manila~~	~~Philippines~~	World Trade Center Manila	Aquaria	Aquaria; Bosco Kahanna Montrese; Kim Chi; Lady Camden; Laganja Estranja; Mistress Isabelle Brooks; Yvie Oddly
September 5, 2023	Taipei	Taiwan	Zepp New Taipei	Aquaria	Aquaria; Bosco Kahanna Montrese; Kim Chi; Lady Camden; Laganja Estranja; Mistress Isabelle Brooks; Yvie Oddly
September 7, 2023	Singapore	Singapore	The Star Theater	Aquaria	Aquaria; Bosco Kahanna Montrese; Kim Chi; Lady Camden; Laganja Estranja; Mistress Isabelle Brooks; Yvie Oddly
Leg 19 – Oceania
September 10, 2023	Perth	Australia	Riverside Theatre	Aquaria	Isis Avis Loren; Gabriella Labucci; Hollywould Star; Flor Aquaria; Kim Chi; Lady Camden; Laganja Estranja; Naomi Smalls; Mistress Isabelle Brooks; Kahanna Montreese
September 13, 2023	Adelaide	Australia	Adelaide Entertainment Centre	Aquaria	Isis Avis Loren; Gabriella Labucci; Hollywould Star; Flor Aquaria; Kim Chi; Lady Camden; Laganja Estranja; Naomi Smalls; Mistress Isabelle Brooks; Kahanna Montreese
September 15, 2023	Melbourne	Australia	Margaret Court Arena	Aquaria	Isis Avis Loren; Gabriella Labucci; Hollywould Star; Flor Aquaria; Kim Chi; Lady Camden; Laganja Estranja; Naomi Smalls; Mistress Isabelle Brooks; Kahanna Montreese
September 16, 2023	Canberra	Australia	NCCC Royal Theatre	Aquaria	Isis Avis Loren; Gabriella Labucci; Hollywould Star; Flor Aquaria; Kim Chi; Lady Camden; Laganja Estranja; Naomi Smalls; Mistress Isabelle Brooks; Kahanna Montreese
September 17, 2023	Newcastle	Australia	Newcastle Entertainment Centre	Aquaria	Isis Avis Loren; Gabriella Labucci; Hollywould Star; Flor Aquaria; Kim Chi; Lady Camden; Laganja Estranja; Naomi Smalls; Mistress Isabelle Brooks; Kahanna Montreese
September 20, 2023	Brisbane	Australia	Brisbane Entertainment Centre	Aquaria	Isis Avis Loren; Gabriella Labucci; Hollywould Star; Flor Aquaria; Kim Chi; Lady Camden; Laganja Estranja; Naomi Smalls; Mistress Isabelle Brooks; Kahanna Montreese
September 21, 2023	Sydney	Australia	Aware Super Theatre	Aquaria	Isis Avis Loren; Gabriella Labucci; Hollywould Star; Flor Aquaria; Kim Chi; Lady Camden; Laganja Estranja; Naomi Smalls; Mistress Isabelle Brooks; Kahanna Montreese
Leg 20 – Europe
~~October 6, 2023~~	~~Leeds~~	England	First Direct Arena	Aquaria	Bosco; Daya Betty; Ginger Minj; Kandy Muse; Mistress Isabelle Brooks; Vanessa Vanjie Mateo
October 7, 2023	Manchester	England	Apollo Manchester	Aquaria	Bosco; Daya Betty; Ginger Minj; Kandy Muse; Mistress Isabelle Brooks; Vanessa Vanjie Mateo
October 8, 2023	London	England	O_{2}The O ArenaO_{2}	Aquaria	Bosco; Daya Betty; Ginger Minj; Kandy Muse; Mistress Isabelle Brooks; Vanessa Vanjie Mateo
October 12, 2023	Birmingham	England	Utilita Arena Birmingham	Aquaria	Bosco; Daya Betty; Ginger Minj; Kandy Muse; Mistress Isabelle Brooks; Vanessa Vanjie Mateo
October 15, 2023	Glasgow	Scotland	OVO Hydro	Aquaria	Bosco; Daya Betty; Ginger Minj; Kandy Muse; Mistress Isabelle Brooks; Vanessa Vanjie Mateo
October 18, 2023	Dublin	Ireland	3Arena	Aquaria	Bosco; Daya Betty; Ginger Minj; Kandy Muse; Mistress Isabelle Brooks; Vanessa Vanjie Mateo
October 22, 2023	Prague	Czech Republic	Prague Congress Centre	Aquaria	Bosco; Daya Betty; Ginger Minj; Kandy Muse; Mistress Isabelle Brooks; Vanessa Vanjie Mateo
October 24, 2023	Esch-sur-Alzette	Luxembourg	Rockhal	Aquaria	Bosco; Daya Betty; Ginger Minj; Kandy Muse; Mistress Isabelle Brooks; Vanessa Vanjie Mateo
October 27, 2023	Stockholm	Sweden	Hovet	Aquaria	Bosco; Daya Betty; Ginger Minj; Kandy Muse; Mistress Isabelle Brooks; Vanessa Vanjie Mateo
October 28, 2023	Oslo	Norway	Spektrum	Aquaria	Bosco; Daya Betty; Ginger Minj; Kandy Muse; Mistress Isabelle Brooks; Vanessa Vanjie Mateo
October 29, 2023	Copenhagen	Denmark	Royal Arena	Aquaria	Bosco; Daya Betty; Ginger Minj; Kandy Muse; Mistress Isabelle Brooks; Vanessa Vanjie Mateo
October 31, 2023	Warsaw	Poland	Arena COS Torwar	Aquaria	Bosco; Daya Betty; Ginger Minj; Kandy Muse; Mistress Isabelle Brooks; Vanessa Vanjie Mateo
November 2, 2023	Amsterdam	Netherlands	Ziggo Dome	Aquaria	Bosco; Daya Betty; Ginger Minj; Kandy Muse; Mistress Isabelle Brooks; Vanessa Vanjie Mateo
November 3, 2023	Hamburg	Germany	Barclaycard Arena	Aquaria	Bosco; Daya Betty; Ginger Minj; Kandy Muse; Mistress Isabelle Brooks; Vanessa Vanjie Mateo
November 4, 2023	Cologne	Germany	Lanxess Arena	Aquaria	Bosco; Daya Betty; Ginger Minj; Kandy Muse; Mistress Isabelle Brooks; Vanessa Vanjie Mateo
November 5, 2023	Berlin	Germany	Mercedes-Benz Arena	Aquaria	Bosco; Daya Betty; Ginger Minj; Kandy Muse; Mistress Isabelle Brooks; Vanessa Vanjie Mateo
November 7, 2023	Vienna	Austria	Wiener Stadthalle	Aquaria	Bosco; Daya Betty; Ginger Minj; Kandy Muse; Mistress Isabelle Brooks; Vanessa Vanjie Mateo
November 9, 2023	Antwerp	Belgium	Lotto Arena	Aquaria	Bosco; Daya Betty; Ginger Minj; Kandy Muse; Mistress Isabelle Brooks; Vanessa Vanjie Mateo
November 10, 2023	Paris	France	Accor Arena	Aquaria	Bosco; Daya Betty; Ginger Minj; Kandy Muse; Mistress Isabelle Brooks; Vanessa Vanjie Mateo
November 11, 2023	Zurich	Switzerland	The Hall	Aquaria	Bosco; Daya Betty; Ginger Minj; Kandy Muse; Mistress Isabelle Brooks; Vanessa Vanjie Mateo
November 12, 2023	Milan	Italy	Mediolanum Forum	Aquaria	Bosco; Daya Betty; Ginger Minj; Kandy Muse; Mistress Isabelle Brooks; Vanessa Vanjie Mateo
Leg 21 – Latin America
November 17, 2023	Monterrey	Mexico	Auditorio Citibanamex	Asia O'Hara; Jaida Essence Hall	Angeria Paris VanMicheals; Aquaria; Bosco; Daya Betty; DeJa Skye; Ginger Minj; Jorgeous; Kandy Muse; Kim Chi; Lady Camden; Laganja Estranja; Mistress Isabelle Brooks; Naomi Smalls; Plastique Tiara; Rosé; Sasha Colby; Vanessa Vanjie Mateo
November 18, 2023	Guadalajara	Mexico	Auditorio Telmex	Asia O'Hara; Jaida Essence Hall	Angeria Paris VanMicheals; Aquaria; Bosco; Daya Betty; DeJa Skye; Ginger Minj; Jorgeous; Kandy Muse; Kim Chi; Lady Camden; Laganja Estranja; Mistress Isabelle Brooks; Naomi Smalls; Plastique Tiara; Rosé; Sasha Colby; Vanessa Vanjie Mateo
November 19, 2023	Mexico City	Mexico	Auditorio Nacional	Asia O'Hara; Jaida Essence Hall	Angeria Paris VanMicheals; Aquaria; Bosco; Daya Betty; DeJa Skye; Ginger Minj; Jorgeous; Kandy Muse; Kim Chi; Lady Camden; Laganja Estranja; Mistress Isabelle Brooks; Naomi Smalls; Plastique Tiara; Rosé; Sasha Colby; Vanessa Vanjie Mateo

=== 2025 dates ===
Date	City	Country	Venue	Host	Performers
Leg 22 – Europe
April 6, 2025	Dublin	Ireland	3Arena	Sasha Velour	Derrick Barry; Jaida Essence Hall; Marina Summers; Roxxxy Andrews; Vanessa Vanjie
April 9, 2025	Warsaw	Poland	COS Torwar	Sasha Velour	Derrick Barry; Jaida Essence Hall; Marina Summers; Roxxxy Andrews; Vanessa Vanjie
April 10, 2025	Berlin	Germany	Uber Eats Music Hall	Sasha Velour	Derrick Barry; Jaida Essence Hall; Marina Summers; Roxxxy Andrews; Vanessa Vanjie
April 11, 2025	Düsseldorf	Germany	Mitsubishi Electric Halle	Sasha Velour	Derrick Barry; Jaida Essence Hall; Marina Summers; Roxxxy Andrews; Vanessa Vanjie
April 13, 2025	Amsterdam	Netherlands	AFAS Live	Sasha Velour	Derrick Barry; Jaida Essence Hall; Marina Summers; Roxxxy Andrews; Vanessa Vanjie
April 14, 2025	London	England	London Palladium	Sasha Velour	Derrick Barry; Jaida Essence Hall; Marina Summers; Roxxxy Andrews; Vanessa Vanjie
April 15, 2025	Paris	France	Le Grand Rex	Sasha Velour	Derrick Barry; Jaida Essence Hall; Marina Summers; Roxxxy Andrews; Vanessa Vanjie
April 16, 2025	Zurich	Switzerland	The Hall	Sasha Velour	Derrick Barry; Jaida Essence Hall; Marina Summers; Roxxxy Andrews; Vanessa Vanjie
April 17, 2025	Milan	Italy	Alcatraz	Sasha Velour	Derrick Barry; Jaida Essence Hall; Marina Summers; Roxxxy Andrews; Vanessa Vanjie
April 18, 2025	Vienna	Austria	Wiener Stadthalle	Sasha Velour	Derrick Barry; Jaida Essence Hall; Marina Summers; Roxxxy Andrews; Vanessa Vanjie
Leg 23 – Oceania
April 22, 2025	Perth	Australia	Riverside Theatre	Sasha Velour	Derrick Barry; Jaida Essence Hall; Marina Summers; Roxxxy Andrews; Vanessa Vanjie
April 24, 2025	Brisbane	Australia	Great Hall Bcec	Sasha Velour	Derrick Barry; Jaida Essence Hall; Marina Summers; Roxxxy Andrews; Vanessa Vanjie
April 26, 2025	Sydney	Australia	Darling Harbour Theatre	Sasha Velour	Derrick Barry; Jaida Essence Hall; Marina Summers; Roxxxy Andrews; Vanessa Vanjie
April 27, 2025	Melbourne	Australia	Palais Theatre	Sasha Velour	Derrick Barry; Jaida Essence Hall; Marina Summers; Roxxxy Andrews; Vanessa Vanjie
Leg 24 – North America
August 15, 2025	Mashantucket	United States	Foxwoods Resort Casino	Jimbo; Sasha Velour	Daya Betty; Derrick Barry; Jaida Essence Hall; Jorgeous; Kim Chi; Morphine Love Dion; Naomi Smalls; Onya Nurve; Roxxxy Andrews; Vanessa Vanjie Mateo
August 16, 2025	Schenectady	United States	Proctor's Theatre	Jimbo; Sasha Velour	Daya Betty; Derrick Barry; Jaida Essence Hall; Jorgeous; Kim Chi; Morphine Love Dion; Naomi Smalls; Onya Nurve; Roxxxy Andrews; Vanessa Vanjie Mateo
August 17, 2025	New Brunswick	United States	State Theatre	Jimbo; Sasha Velour	Daya Betty; Derrick Barry; Jaida Essence Hall; Jorgeous; Kim Chi; Morphine Love Dion; Naomi Smalls; Onya Nurve; Roxxxy Andrews; Vanessa Vanjie Mateo
August 19, 2025	Cleveland	United States	KeyBank State Theatre	Jimbo; Sasha Velour	Daya Betty; Derrick Barry; Jaida Essence Hall; Jorgeous; Kim Chi; Morphine Love Dion; Naomi Smalls; Onya Nurve; Roxxxy Andrews; Vanessa Vanjie Mateo
August 21, 2025	Toronto	Canada	The Theatre at Great Canadian Casino Resort	Jimbo; Sasha Velour	Daya Betty; Derrick Barry; Jaida Essence Hall; Jorgeous; Kim Chi; Morphine Love Dion; Naomi Smalls; Onya Nurve; Roxxxy Andrews; Vanessa Vanjie Mateo
August 22, 2025	Windsor	Canada	Caesars Windsor	Jimbo; Sasha Velour	Daya Betty; Derrick Barry; Jaida Essence Hall; Jorgeous; Kim Chi; Morphine Love Dion; Naomi Smalls; Onya Nurve; Roxxxy Andrews; Vanessa Vanjie Mateo
August 23, 2025	Rochester	United States	Kodak Center	Jimbo; Sasha Velour	Daya Betty; Derrick Barry; Jaida Essence Hall; Jorgeous; Kim Chi; Morphine Love Dion; Naomi Smalls; Onya Nurve; Roxxxy Andrews; Vanessa Vanjie Mateo
August 25, 2025	Boston	United States	MGM Music Hall at Fenway	Jimbo; Sasha Velour	Daya Betty; Derrick Barry; Jaida Essence Hall; Jorgeous; Kim Chi; Morphine Love Dion; Naomi Smalls; Onya Nurve; Roxxxy Andrews; Vanessa Vanjie Mateo
August 26, 2025	Portland	United States	State Theatre	Jimbo; Sasha Velour	Daya Betty; Derrick Barry; Jaida Essence Hall; Jorgeous; Kim Chi; Morphine Love Dion; Naomi Smalls; Onya Nurve; Roxxxy Andrews; Vanessa Vanjie Mateo
August 28, 2025	New York City	United States	The Rooftop at Pier 17	Jimbo; Sasha Velour	Daya Betty; Derrick Barry; Jaida Essence Hall; Jorgeous; Kim Chi; Morphine Love Dion; Naomi Smalls; Onya Nurve; Roxxxy Andrews; Vanessa Vanjie Mateo
August 29, 2025	Atlantic City	United States	Tropicana Casino & Resort	Jimbo; Sasha Velour	Daya Betty; Derrick Barry; Jaida Essence Hall; Jorgeous; Kim Chi; Morphine Love Dion; Naomi Smalls; Onya Nurve; Roxxxy Andrews; Vanessa Vanjie Mateo
August 30, 2025	Washington, D.C.	United States	The Anthem	Jimbo; Sasha Velour	Daya Betty; Derrick Barry; Jaida Essence Hall; Jorgeous; Kim Chi; Morphine Love Dion; Naomi Smalls; Onya Nurve; Roxxxy Andrews; Vanessa Vanjie Mateo
August 31, 2025	Durham	United States	Durham Performing Arts Center	Jimbo; Sasha Velour	Daya Betty; Derrick Barry; Jaida Essence Hall; Jorgeous; Kim Chi; Morphine Love Dion; Naomi Smalls; Onya Nurve; Roxxxy Andrews; Vanessa Vanjie Mateo
September 2, 2025	Richmond	United States	Altria Theater	Jimbo; Sasha Velour	Daya Betty; Derrick Barry; Jaida Essence Hall; Jorgeous; Kim Chi; Morphine Love Dion; Naomi Smalls; Onya Nurve; Roxxxy Andrews; Vanessa Vanjie Mateo
September 4, 2025	Atlanta	United States	Cobb Energy Performing Arts Centre	Jimbo; Sasha Velour	Daya Betty; Derrick Barry; Jaida Essence Hall; Jorgeous; Kim Chi; Morphine Love Dion; Naomi Smalls; Onya Nurve; Roxxxy Andrews; Vanessa Vanjie Mateo
September 5, 2025	Charlotte	United States	Ovens Auditorium	Jimbo; Sasha Velour	Daya Betty; Derrick Barry; Jaida Essence Hall; Jorgeous; Kim Chi; Morphine Love Dion; Naomi Smalls; Onya Nurve; Roxxxy Andrews; Vanessa Vanjie Mateo
September 6, 2025	Spartanburg	United States	Spartanburg Memorial Auditorium	Jimbo; Sasha Velour	Daya Betty; Derrick Barry; Jaida Essence Hall; Jorgeous; Kim Chi; Morphine Love Dion; Naomi Smalls; Onya Nurve; Roxxxy Andrews; Vanessa Vanjie Mateo
September 9, 2025	Savannah	United States	Savannah Civic Center	Jimbo; Sasha Velour	Daya Betty; Derrick Barry; Jaida Essence Hall; Jorgeous; Kim Chi; Morphine Love Dion; Naomi Smalls; Onya Nurve; Roxxxy Andrews; Vanessa Vanjie Mateo
September 10, 2025	Orlando	United States	Walt Disney Theatre	Jimbo; Sasha Velour	Daya Betty; Derrick Barry; Jaida Essence Hall; Jorgeous; Kim Chi; Morphine Love Dion; Naomi Smalls; Onya Nurve; Roxxxy Andrews; Vanessa Vanjie Mateo
September 12, 2025	Fort Lauderdale	United States	Au-Rene Theater	Jimbo; Sasha Velour	Daya Betty; Derrick Barry; Jaida Essence Hall; Jorgeous; Kim Chi; Morphine Love Dion; Naomi Smalls; Onya Nurve; Roxxxy Andrews; Vanessa Vanjie Mateo
September 13, 2025	Clearwater	United States	Ruth Eckerd Hall	Jimbo; Sasha Velour	Daya Betty; Derrick Barry; Jaida Essence Hall; Jorgeous; Kim Chi; Morphine Love Dion; Naomi Smalls; Onya Nurve; Roxxxy Andrews; Vanessa Vanjie Mateo
September 14, 2025	Pensacola	United States	Saenger Theatre	Jimbo; Sasha Velour	Daya Betty; Derrick Barry; Jaida Essence Hall; Jorgeous; Kim Chi; Morphine Love Dion; Naomi Smalls; Onya Nurve; Roxxxy Andrews; Vanessa Vanjie Mateo
September 16, 2025	Sugar Land	United States	Smart Financial Centre	Jimbo; Sasha Velour	Daya Betty; Derrick Barry; Jaida Essence Hall; Jorgeous; Kim Chi; Morphine Love Dion; Naomi Smalls; Onya Nurve; Roxxxy Andrews; Vanessa Vanjie Mateo
September 17, 2025	San Antonio	United States	Majestic Theatre	Jimbo; Sasha Velour	Daya Betty; Derrick Barry; Jaida Essence Hall; Jorgeous; Kim Chi; Morphine Love Dion; Naomi Smalls; Onya Nurve; Roxxxy Andrews; Vanessa Vanjie Mateo
September 18, 2025	Grand Prairie	United States	Texas Trust CU Theatre	Jimbo; Sasha Velour	Daya Betty; Derrick Barry; Jaida Essence Hall; Jorgeous; Kim Chi; Morphine Love Dion; Naomi Smalls; Onya Nurve; Roxxxy Andrews; Vanessa Vanjie Mateo
September 20, 2025	Kansas City	United States	Uptown Theater	Jimbo; Sasha Velour	Daya Betty; Derrick Barry; Jaida Essence Hall; Jorgeous; Kim Chi; Morphine Love Dion; Naomi Smalls; Onya Nurve; Roxxxy Andrews; Vanessa Vanjie Mateo
September 21, 2025	Chesterfield	United States	The Factory	Jimbo; Sasha Velour	Daya Betty; Derrick Barry; Jaida Essence Hall; Jorgeous; Kim Chi; Morphine Love Dion; Naomi Smalls; Onya Nurve; Roxxxy Andrews; Vanessa Vanjie Mateo
September 22, 2025	Nashville	United States	The Pinnacle	Jimbo; Sasha Velour	Daya Betty; Derrick Barry; Jaida Essence Hall; Jorgeous; Kim Chi; Morphine Love Dion; Naomi Smalls; Onya Nurve; Roxxxy Andrews; Vanessa Vanjie Mateo
September 23, 2025	Indianapolis	United States	Murat Theatre	Jimbo; Sasha Velour	Daya Betty; Derrick Barry; Jaida Essence Hall; Jorgeous; Kim Chi; Morphine Love Dion; Naomi Smalls; Onya Nurve; Roxxxy Andrews; Vanessa Vanjie Mateo
September 25, 2025	Columbus	United States	Mershon Auditorium	Jimbo; Sasha Velour	Daya Betty; Derrick Barry; Jaida Essence Hall; Jorgeous; Kim Chi; Morphine Love Dion; Naomi Smalls; Onya Nurve; Roxxxy Andrews; Vanessa Vanjie Mateo
September 26, 2025	Louisville	United States	Palace Theatre	Jimbo; Sasha Velour	Daya Betty; Derrick Barry; Jaida Essence Hall; Jorgeous; Kim Chi; Morphine Love Dion; Naomi Smalls; Onya Nurve; Roxxxy Andrews; Vanessa Vanjie Mateo
September 27, 2025	Rosemont	United States	Rosemont Theatre	Jimbo; Sasha Velour	Daya Betty; Derrick Barry; Jaida Essence Hall; Jorgeous; Kim Chi; Morphine Love Dion; Naomi Smalls; Onya Nurve; Roxxxy Andrews; Vanessa Vanjie Mateo
September 29, 2025	Denver	United States	Mission Ballroom	Jimbo; Sasha Velour	Daya Betty; Derrick Barry; Jaida Essence Hall; Jorgeous; Kim Chi; Morphine Love Dion; Naomi Smalls; Onya Nurve; Roxxxy Andrews; Vanessa Vanjie Mateo
October 2, 2025	San Francisco	United States	Bill Graham Civic Auditorium	Jimbo; Sasha Velour	Daya Betty; Derrick Barry; Jaida Essence Hall; Jorgeous; Kim Chi; Morphine Love Dion; Naomi Smalls; Onya Nurve; Roxxxy Andrews; Vanessa Vanjie Mateo
October 3, 2025	Wheatland	United States	Hard Rock Hotel & Casino Sacramento	Jimbo; Sasha Velour	Daya Betty; Derrick Barry; Jaida Essence Hall; Jorgeous; Kim Chi; Morphine Love Dion; Naomi Smalls; Onya Nurve; Roxxxy Andrews; Vanessa Vanjie Mateo
October 4, 2025	Reno	United States	Grand Sierra Resort	Jimbo; Sasha Velour	Daya Betty; Derrick Barry; Jaida Essence Hall; Jorgeous; Kim Chi; Morphine Love Dion; Naomi Smalls; Onya Nurve; Roxxxy Andrews; Vanessa Vanjie Mateo
October 6, 2025	Phoenix	United States	Arizona Financial Theatre	Jimbo; Sasha Velour	Daya Betty; Derrick Barry; Jaida Essence Hall; Jorgeous; Kim Chi; Morphine Love Dion; Naomi Smalls; Onya Nurve; Roxxxy Andrews; Vanessa Vanjie Mateo
October 7, 2025	Los Angeles	United States	Pellissier Building and Wiltern Theatre	Jimbo; Sasha Velour	Daya Betty; Derrick Barry; Jaida Essence Hall; Jorgeous; Kim Chi; Morphine Love Dion; Naomi Smalls; Onya Nurve; Roxxxy Andrews; Vanessa Vanjie Mateo
October 10, 2025	Valley Center	United States	Harrah's Resort Southern California	Jimbo; Sasha Velour	Daya Betty; Derrick Barry; Jaida Essence Hall; Jorgeous; Kim Chi; Morphine Love Dion; Naomi Smalls; Onya Nurve; Roxxxy Andrews; Vanessa Vanjie Mateo
October 11, 2025	Rancho Mirage	United States	Agua Caliente Casino	Jimbo; Sasha Velour	Daya Betty; Derrick Barry; Jaida Essence Hall; Jorgeous; Kim Chi; Morphine Love Dion; Naomi Smalls; Onya Nurve; Roxxxy Andrews; Vanessa Vanjie Mateo
October 13, 2025	Eugene	United States	Hult Center for the Performing Arts	Jimbo; Sasha Velour	Daya Betty; Derrick Barry; Jaida Essence Hall; Jorgeous; Kim Chi; Morphine Love Dion; Naomi Smalls; Onya Nurve; Roxxxy Andrews; Vanessa Vanjie Mateo
October 14, 2025	Seattle	United States	Paramount Theatre Seattle	Jimbo; Sasha Velour	Daya Betty; Derrick Barry; Jaida Essence Hall; Jorgeous; Kim Chi; Morphine Love Dion; Naomi Smalls; Onya Nurve; Roxxxy Andrews; Vanessa Vanjie Mateo
October 15, 2025	Vancouver	Canada	Queen Elizabeth Theatre	Jimbo; Sasha Velour	Daya Betty; Derrick Barry; Jaida Essence Hall; Jorgeous; Kim Chi; Morphine Love Dion; Naomi Smalls; Onya Nurve; Roxxxy Andrews; Vanessa Vanjie Mateo
October 17, 2025	Edmonton	Canada	Northern Alberta Jubilee Auditorium	Jimbo; Sasha Velour	Daya Betty; Derrick Barry; Jaida Essence Hall; Jorgeous; Kim Chi; Morphine Love Dion; Naomi Smalls; Onya Nurve; Roxxxy Andrews; Vanessa Vanjie Mateo
October 18, 2025	Calgary	Canada	Grey Eagle Event Centre	Jimbo; Sasha Velour	Daya Betty; Derrick Barry; Jaida Essence Hall; Jorgeous; Kim Chi; Morphine Love Dion; Naomi Smalls; Onya Nurve; Roxxxy Andrews; Vanessa Vanjie Mateo

=== 2027 dates ===
Date	City	Country	Venue	Host	Performers
Leg 25 – North America
February 5, 2027	Mashantucket	United States	Foxwoods Resort Casino	Asia O'Hara	Daya Betty; Jewels Sparkles; Jorgeous; Latrice Royale; Morphine Love Dion; Plane Jane; Roxxxy Andrews; Shannel; Vanessa Vanjie Mateo
February 6, 2027	Atlantic City	United States	Tropicana Casino & Resort	Asia O'Hara	Daya Betty; Jewels Sparkles; Jorgeous; Latrice Royale; Morphine Love Dion; Plane Jane; Roxxxy Andrews; Shannel; Vanessa Vanjie Mateo
February 7, 2027	Washington, D.C.	United States	MGM National Harbor	Asia O'Hara	Daya Betty; Jewels Sparkles; Jorgeous; Latrice Royale; Morphine Love Dion; Plane Jane; Roxxxy Andrews; Shannel; Vanessa Vanjie Mateo
February 9, 2027	Charleston	United States	Gaillard Center	Asia O'Hara	Daya Betty; Jewels Sparkles; Jorgeous; Latrice Royale; Morphine Love Dion; Plane Jane; Roxxxy Andrews; Shannel; Vanessa Vanjie Mateo
February 11, 2027	Wilmington	United States	Wilson Center	Asia O'Hara	Daya Betty; Jewels Sparkles; Jorgeous; Latrice Royale; Morphine Love Dion; Plane Jane; Roxxxy Andrews; Shannel; Vanessa Vanjie Mateo
February 12, 2027	Charlotte	United States	Ovens Auditorium	Asia O'Hara	Daya Betty; Jewels Sparkles; Jorgeous; Latrice Royale; Morphine Love Dion; Plane Jane; Roxxxy Andrews; Shannel; Vanessa Vanjie Mateo
February 13, 2027	Athens	United States	Classic Center	Asia O'Hara	Daya Betty; Jewels Sparkles; Jorgeous; Latrice Royale; Morphine Love Dion; Plane Jane; Roxxxy Andrews; Shannel; Vanessa Vanjie Mateo
February 16, 2027	Durham	United States	Durham Performing Arts Center	Asia O'Hara	Daya Betty; Jewels Sparkles; Jorgeous; Latrice Royale; Morphine Love Dion; Plane Jane; Roxxxy Andrews; Shannel; Vanessa Vanjie Mateo
February 18, 2027	Jacksonville	United States	Florida Theatre	Asia O'Hara	Daya Betty; Jewels Sparkles; Jorgeous; Latrice Royale; Morphine Love Dion; Plane Jane; Roxxxy Andrews; Shannel; Vanessa Vanjie Mateo
February 19, 2027	Clearwater	United States	Ruth Eckerd Hall	Asia O'Hara	Daya Betty; Jewels Sparkles; Jorgeous; Latrice Royale; Morphine Love Dion; Plane Jane; Roxxxy Andrews; Shannel; Vanessa Vanjie Mateo
February 20, 2027	Orlando	United States	Hard Rock Live at Universal CityWalk	Asia O'Hara	Daya Betty; Jewels Sparkles; Jorgeous; Latrice Royale; Morphine Love Dion; Plane Jane; Roxxxy Andrews; Shannel; Vanessa Vanjie Mateo
February 21, 2027	Pensacola	United States	Saenger Theatre	Asia O'Hara	Daya Betty; Jewels Sparkles; Jorgeous; Latrice Royale; Morphine Love Dion; Plane Jane; Roxxxy Andrews; Shannel; Vanessa Vanjie Mateo
February 23, 2027	Austin	United States	Moody Theater	Asia O'Hara	Daya Betty; Jewels Sparkles; Jorgeous; Latrice Royale; Morphine Love Dion; Plane Jane; Roxxxy Andrews; Shannel; Vanessa Vanjie Mateo
February 24, 2027	San Antonio	United States	Majestic Theatre	Asia O'Hara	Daya Betty; Jewels Sparkles; Jorgeous; Latrice Royale; Morphine Love Dion; Plane Jane; Roxxxy Andrews; Shannel; Vanessa Vanjie Mateo
February 26, 2027	Houston	United States	713 Music Hall	Asia O'Hara	Daya Betty; Jewels Sparkles; Jorgeous; Latrice Royale; Morphine Love Dion; Plane Jane; Roxxxy Andrews; Shannel; Vanessa Vanjie Mateo
February 27, 2027	Irving	United States	The Pavilion at Toyota Music Factory	Asia O'Hara	Daya Betty; Jewels Sparkles; Jorgeous; Latrice Royale; Morphine Love Dion; Plane Jane; Roxxxy Andrews; Shannel; Vanessa Vanjie Mateo
February 28, 2027	Tulsa	United States	Tulsa Theater	Asia O'Hara	Daya Betty; Jewels Sparkles; Jorgeous; Latrice Royale; Morphine Love Dion; Plane Jane; Roxxxy Andrews; Shannel; Vanessa Vanjie Mateo
March 2, 2027	Omaha	United States	Orpheum Theatre	Asia O'Hara	Daya Betty; Jewels Sparkles; Jorgeous; Latrice Royale; Morphine Love Dion; Plane Jane; Roxxxy Andrews; Shannel; Vanessa Vanjie Mateo
March 3, 2027	Denver	United States	Mission Ballroom	Asia O'Hara	Daya Betty; Jewels Sparkles; Jorgeous; Latrice Royale; Morphine Love Dion; Plane Jane; Roxxxy Andrews; Shannel; Vanessa Vanjie Mateo
March 5, 2027	San Diego	United States	Balboa Theatre	Asia O'Hara	Daya Betty; Jewels Sparkles; Jorgeous; Latrice Royale; Morphine Love Dion; Plane Jane; Roxxxy Andrews; Shannel; Vanessa Vanjie Mateo
March 6, 2027	Rancho Mirage	United States	Agua Caliente Casino	Asia O'Hara	Daya Betty; Jewels Sparkles; Jorgeous; Latrice Royale; Morphine Love Dion; Plane Jane; Roxxxy Andrews; Shannel; Vanessa Vanjie Mateo
March 7, 2027	Anaheim	United States	City National Grove of Anaheim	Asia O'Hara	Daya Betty; Jewels Sparkles; Jorgeous; Latrice Royale; Morphine Love Dion; Plane Jane; Roxxxy Andrews; Shannel; Vanessa Vanjie Mateo
March 9, 2027	Phoenix	United States	Arizona Financial Theatre	Asia O'Hara	Daya Betty; Jewels Sparkles; Jorgeous; Latrice Royale; Morphine Love Dion; Plane Jane; Roxxxy Andrews; Shannel; Vanessa Vanjie Mateo
March 11, 2027	Los Angeles	United States	Orpheum Theatre	Asia O'Hara	Daya Betty; Jewels Sparkles; Jorgeous; Latrice Royale; Morphine Love Dion; Plane Jane; Roxxxy Andrews; Shannel; Vanessa Vanjie Mateo
March 12, 2027	Lemoore	United States	Tachi Palace	Asia O'Hara	Daya Betty; Jewels Sparkles; Jorgeous; Latrice Royale; Morphine Love Dion; Plane Jane; Roxxxy Andrews; Shannel; Vanessa Vanjie Mateo
March 13, 2027	Reno	United States	Grand Sierra Resort	Asia O'Hara	Daya Betty; Jewels Sparkles; Jorgeous; Latrice Royale; Morphine Love Dion; Plane Jane; Roxxxy Andrews; Shannel; Vanessa Vanjie Mateo
March 14, 2027	San Francisco	United States	Warfield Theatre	Asia O'Hara	Daya Betty; Jewels Sparkles; Jorgeous; Latrice Royale; Morphine Love Dion; Plane Jane; Roxxxy Andrews; Shannel; Vanessa Vanjie Mateo
March 16, 2027	Salem	United States	Elsinore Theatre	Asia O'Hara	Daya Betty; Jewels Sparkles; Jorgeous; Latrice Royale; Morphine Love Dion; Plane Jane; Roxxxy Andrews; Shannel; Vanessa Vanjie Mateo
March 17, 2027	Seattle	United States	5th Avenue Theatre	Asia O'Hara	Daya Betty; Jewels Sparkles; Jorgeous; Latrice Royale; Morphine Love Dion; Plane Jane; Roxxxy Andrews; Shannel; Vanessa Vanjie Mateo
March 18, 2027	Vancouver	Canada	Queen Elizabeth Theatre	Asia O'Hara	Daya Betty; Jewels Sparkles; Jorgeous; Latrice Royale; Morphine Love Dion; Plane Jane; Roxxxy Andrews; Shannel; Vanessa Vanjie Mateo
March 20, 2027	Enoch	Canada	River Cree Resort and Casino	Asia O'Hara	Daya Betty; Jewels Sparkles; Jorgeous; Latrice Royale; Morphine Love Dion; Plane Jane; Roxxxy Andrews; Shannel; Vanessa Vanjie Mateo
March 21, 2027	Calgary	Canada	Grey Eagle Event Centre	Asia O'Hara	Daya Betty; Jewels Sparkles; Jorgeous; Latrice Royale; Morphine Love Dion; Plane Jane; Roxxxy Andrews; Shannel; Vanessa Vanjie Mateo
March 23, 2027	Regina	Canada	Conexus Arts Centre	Asia O'Hara	Daya Betty; Jewels Sparkles; Jorgeous; Latrice Royale; Morphine Love Dion; Plane Jane; Roxxxy Andrews; Shannel; Vanessa Vanjie Mateo
March 24, 2027	Winnipeg	Canada	Club Regent Casino	Asia O'Hara	Daya Betty; Jewels Sparkles; Jorgeous; Latrice Royale; Morphine Love Dion; Plane Jane; Roxxxy Andrews; Shannel; Vanessa Vanjie Mateo
March 26, 2027	Carlton	United States	Black Bear Casino Resort	Asia O'Hara	Daya Betty; Jewels Sparkles; Jorgeous; Latrice Royale; Morphine Love Dion; Plane Jane; Roxxxy Andrews; Shannel; Vanessa Vanjie Mateo
March 27, 2027	Chicago	United States	Chicago Theatre	Asia O'Hara	Daya Betty; Jewels Sparkles; Jorgeous; Latrice Royale; Morphine Love Dion; Plane Jane; Roxxxy Andrews; Shannel; Vanessa Vanjie Mateo
March 30, 2027	Cincinnati	United States	Taft Theatre	Asia O'Hara	Daya Betty; Jewels Sparkles; Jorgeous; Latrice Royale; Morphine Love Dion; Plane Jane; Roxxxy Andrews; Shannel; Vanessa Vanjie Mateo
March 31, 2027	Louisville	United States	Palace Theatre	Asia O'Hara	Daya Betty; Jewels Sparkles; Jorgeous; Latrice Royale; Morphine Love Dion; Plane Jane; Roxxxy Andrews; Shannel; Vanessa Vanjie Mateo
April 1, 2027	Indianapolis	United States	Murat Theatre	Asia O'Hara	Daya Betty; Jewels Sparkles; Jorgeous; Latrice Royale; Morphine Love Dion; Plane Jane; Roxxxy Andrews; Shannel; Vanessa Vanjie Mateo
April 3, 2027	Waterloo	United States	Del Lago Resort and Casino	Asia O'Hara	Daya Betty; Jewels Sparkles; Jorgeous; Latrice Royale; Morphine Love Dion; Plane Jane; Roxxxy Andrews; Shannel; Vanessa Vanjie Mateo
April 4, 2027	Pittsburgh	United States	Citizens Live at the Wylie	Asia O'Hara	Daya Betty; Jewels Sparkles; Jorgeous; Latrice Royale; Morphine Love Dion; Plane Jane; Roxxxy Andrews; Shannel; Vanessa Vanjie Mateo
April 6, 2027	Cleveland	United States	KeyBank State Theatre	Asia O'Hara	Daya Betty; Jewels Sparkles; Jorgeous; Latrice Royale; Morphine Love Dion; Plane Jane; Roxxxy Andrews; Shannel; Vanessa Vanjie Mateo
April 7, 2027	Detroit	United States	Fisher Theatre	Asia O'Hara	Daya Betty; Jewels Sparkles; Jorgeous; Latrice Royale; Morphine Love Dion; Plane Jane; Roxxxy Andrews; Shannel; Vanessa Vanjie Mateo
April 9, 2027	Toronto	Canada	The Theatre at Great Canadian Casino Resort	Asia O'Hara	Daya Betty; Jewels Sparkles; Jorgeous; Latrice Royale; Morphine Love Dion; Plane Jane; Roxxxy Andrews; Shannel; Vanessa Vanjie Mateo
April 10, 2027	Ottawa	Canada	Hard Rock Live Ottawa	Asia O'Hara	Daya Betty; Jewels Sparkles; Jorgeous; Latrice Royale; Morphine Love Dion; Plane Jane; Roxxxy Andrews; Shannel; Vanessa Vanjie Mateo
April 11, 2027	Montreal	Canada	Théâtre Saint-Denis	Asia O'Hara	Daya Betty; Jewels Sparkles; Jorgeous; Latrice Royale; Morphine Love Dion; Plane Jane; Roxxxy Andrews; Shannel; Vanessa Vanjie Mateo
April 13, 2027	Portland	United States	State Theatre	Asia O'Hara	Daya Betty; Jewels Sparkles; Jorgeous; Latrice Royale; Morphine Love Dion; Plane Jane; Roxxxy Andrews; Shannel; Vanessa Vanjie Mateo
April 14, 2027	Schenectady	United States	Proctor's Theatre	Asia O'Hara	Daya Betty; Jewels Sparkles; Jorgeous; Latrice Royale; Morphine Love Dion; Plane Jane; Roxxxy Andrews; Shannel; Vanessa Vanjie Mateo
April 16, 2027	Boston	United States	Orpheum Theatre	Asia O'Hara	Daya Betty; Jewels Sparkles; Jorgeous; Latrice Royale; Morphine Love Dion; Plane Jane; Roxxxy Andrews; Shannel; Vanessa Vanjie Mateo
April 17, 2027	New York City	United States	Beacon Theatre	Asia O'Hara	Daya Betty; Jewels Sparkles; Jorgeous; Latrice Royale; Morphine Love Dion; Plane Jane; Roxxxy Andrews; Shannel; Vanessa Vanjie Mateo
