= The Bossy Rossy Show =

- RuPaul's Drag Race episode
- Episode no.: Season 10; Episode 5
- Presented by: RuPaul
- Original air date: April 19, 2018

Guest appearances
- Carrie Preston (guest judge); Shania Twain (guest judge); Ross Mathews

Episode chronology
← Previous "The Last Ball on Earth"	Next → "Drag Con Panel Extravaganza"
- RuPaul's Drag Race season 10

"The Bossy Rossy Show" is the fifth episode of the tenth season of the American television series RuPaul's Drag Race. It originally aired on April 19, 2018. The episode's main challenge tasks the contestants with improving on then day-time talk show Bossy Rossy Show, hosted by Ross Mathews. American actress Carrie Preston and Canadian country music singer Shania Twain are guest judges. Eureka wins the episode's main challenge. Mayhem Miller is eliminated from the competition after placing in the bottom and losing a lip-sync contest against Monét X Change to "Man! I Feel Like a Woman!" (1999) by Twain.

== Episode ==
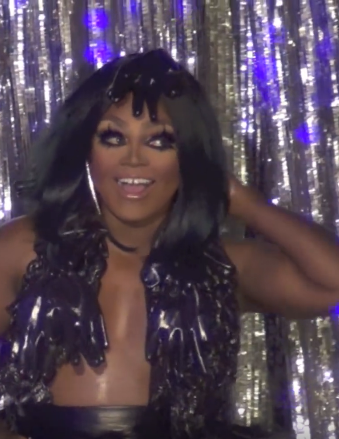
Mayhem Miller (pictured) is eliminated from the competition.

The contestants return to the Werk Room after Dusty Ray Bottoms's elimination from the competition. On a new day, RuPaul greets the group and reveals the mini-challenge, which tasks the contestants with creating military-inspired outfits for the Drag Army. The Vixen is declared the winner.

RuPaul reveals the main challenge, which tasks the contestants with pairing up and improvising on the day-time talk show Bossy Rossy Show. As the winner of the mini-challenge, The Vixen gets to select her partner, then pair the other contestants. Following are the segments and team members:

- "I Married a Cactus!" – Blair St. Clair and Monique Heart
- "My Freaky Addiction Is Ruining My Life!" – Kameron Michaels and Monét X Change
- "Save Me from My Deadly Fear of... Pickles!" – Mayhem Miller and Miz Cracker
- "Why Are You So Obsessed with Me?" – Asia O'Hara and The Vixen
- "Look at Me! I'm a Sexy Baby!" – Aquaria and Eureka

The teams start to brainstorm. Asia O'Hara and The Vixen consider playing on the feud between Aquaria and Miz Cracker. The pairs film the talk show segments with host Ross Mathews in front of a live audience.

On elimination day, the contestants make final preparations in the Werk Room for the fashion show. The Vixen talks about her frustration with Eureka. The two have a discussion about their confrontation on Untucked. On the main stage, RuPaul welcomes fellow judges Michelle Visage and Carson Kressley, as well as guest judges Carrie Preston and Shania Twain. RuPaul shares the assignment and runway category ("Denim and Diamonds"), then the fashion show commences. The judges deliver their critiques, deliberate, then share the results with the group. Eureka is declared the winner of the main challenge. Mayhem Miller and Monét X Change place in the bottom and face off in a lip-sync contest to "Man! I Feel Like a Woman!" (1999) by Twain. Monét X Change wins the lip-sync and Mayhem Miller is eliminated from the competition.

== Production and broadcast ==
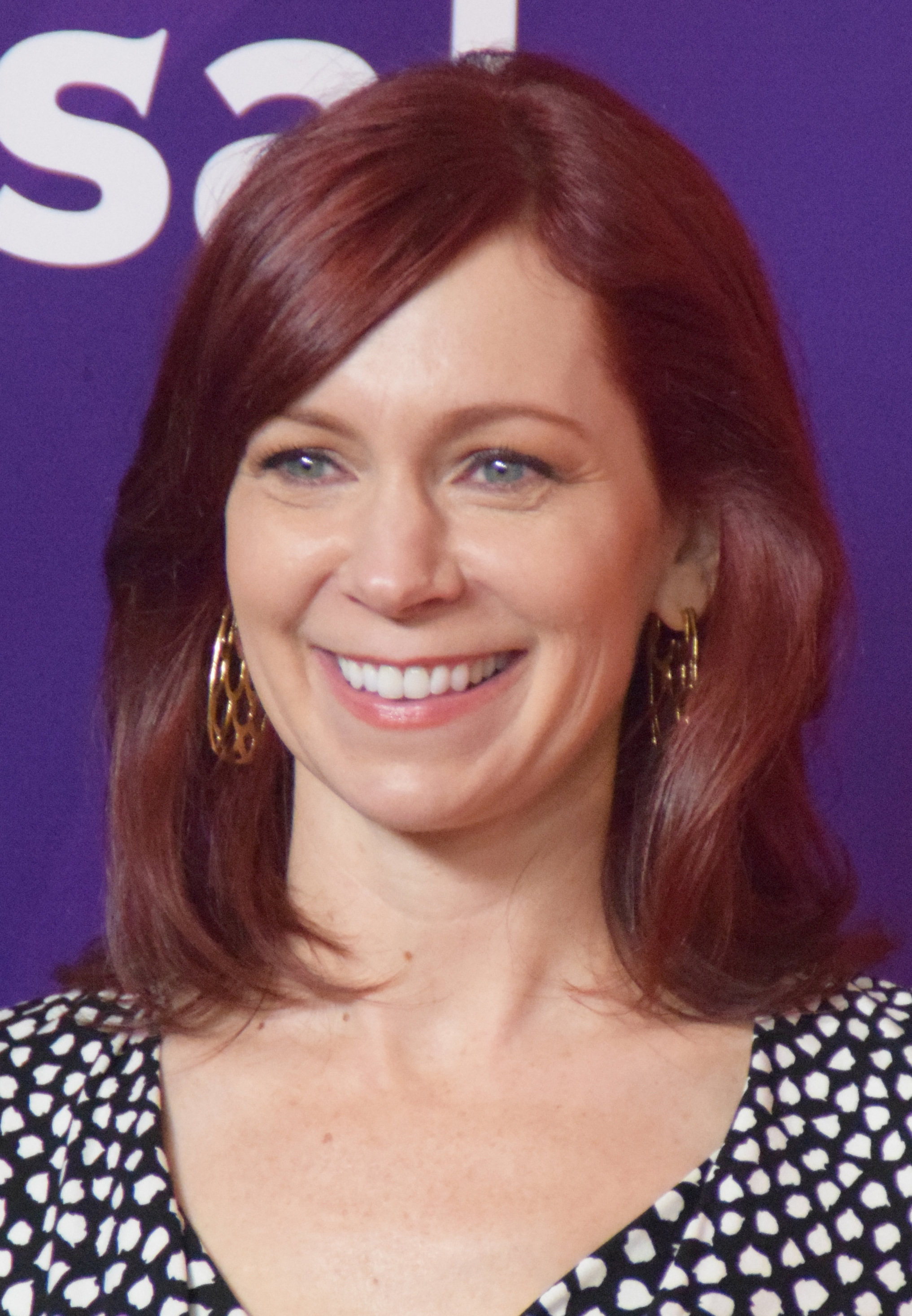
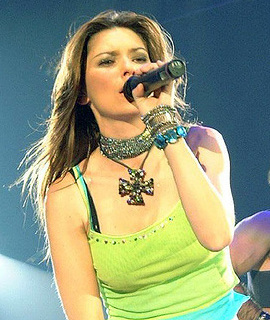
Carrie Preston (top) and Shania Twain (bottom) are guest judges.

The episode originally aired on April 19, 2018.

"I Married a Cactus!" sees Blair St. Clair and Monique Heart fight over a cactus. The pair decide to use "Vanjie" as a safe word. In "My Freaky Addiction Is Ruining My Life!", Monét X Change is addicted to eating her hip pads and Kameron Michaels is addicted to smelling her tucking panties. In "Save Me from My Deadly Fear of... Pickles!", Mayhem Miller is afraid of pickles and Miz Cracker plays Dr. Dill, an expert on "picklephobia". She removes her lab coat to reveal she is a pickle. In "Why Are You So Obsessed with Me?", Asia O'Hara plays a copycat of The Vixen. The two wear similar clothing and wigs. In "Look at Me! I'm a Sexy Baby!", Aquaria and Eureka play people claim to be the world's "sexiest babies". Eureka throws a tantrum.

On the main stage, Kameron Michaels tells Twain she was an inspiration for her drag persona.

=== Fashion ===
For the fashion show, the contestants wear denim and diamond-like embellishments. Monét X Change has chaps with rhinestones, as well as a large brown wig. Kameron Michaels has a Dolly Parton-inspired outfit and a large blonde wig. The Vixrn has a cowgirl-inspired mermaid dress and a blonde wig. Asia O'Hara has an outfit with fringe, a cowboy hat, and a blonde wig. Aquaria has a large hand fan, a cowboy hat, and a blonde wig. Eureka has an Elvis Presley-inspired outfit with a curly blonde wig. Blair St. Clair has a short dress made of jeans and a large brown wig. Monique Heart has chaps, an animal print, and a blonde wig. Mayhem Miller has a short pink dress, white cowboy boots with a matching cowboy hat, and a dark wig. Miz Cracker has a pink outfit with large false front teeth, pink high-heeled shoes, and pigtails.

== Reception ==
Kate Kulzick of The A.V. Club gave the episode a rating of 'B-'. Josh Barrie of PinkNews said Mayhem Miller and Monét X Change perform the lip-sync contest with "style and panache".
