= Grand Finale (RuPaul's Drag Race season 10) =

- RuPaul's Drag Race episode
- Episode no.: Season 10; Episode 14
- Presented by: RuPaul
- Original air date: June 28, 2018
- Running time: 62 minutes

Episode chronology
← Previous "Queens Reunited"	Next → "Whatcha Unpackin?"
- RuPaul's Drag Race season 10

"Grand Finale" is the fourteenth episode of the tenth season of the American television series RuPaul's Drag Race. It was filmed at the Ace Hotel in downtown Los Angeles and originally aired on June 28, 2018. The episode sees the four finalists compete in a tournament of lip-sync contests to be crowned the season's winner. Aquaria wins the tournament.

== Episode ==
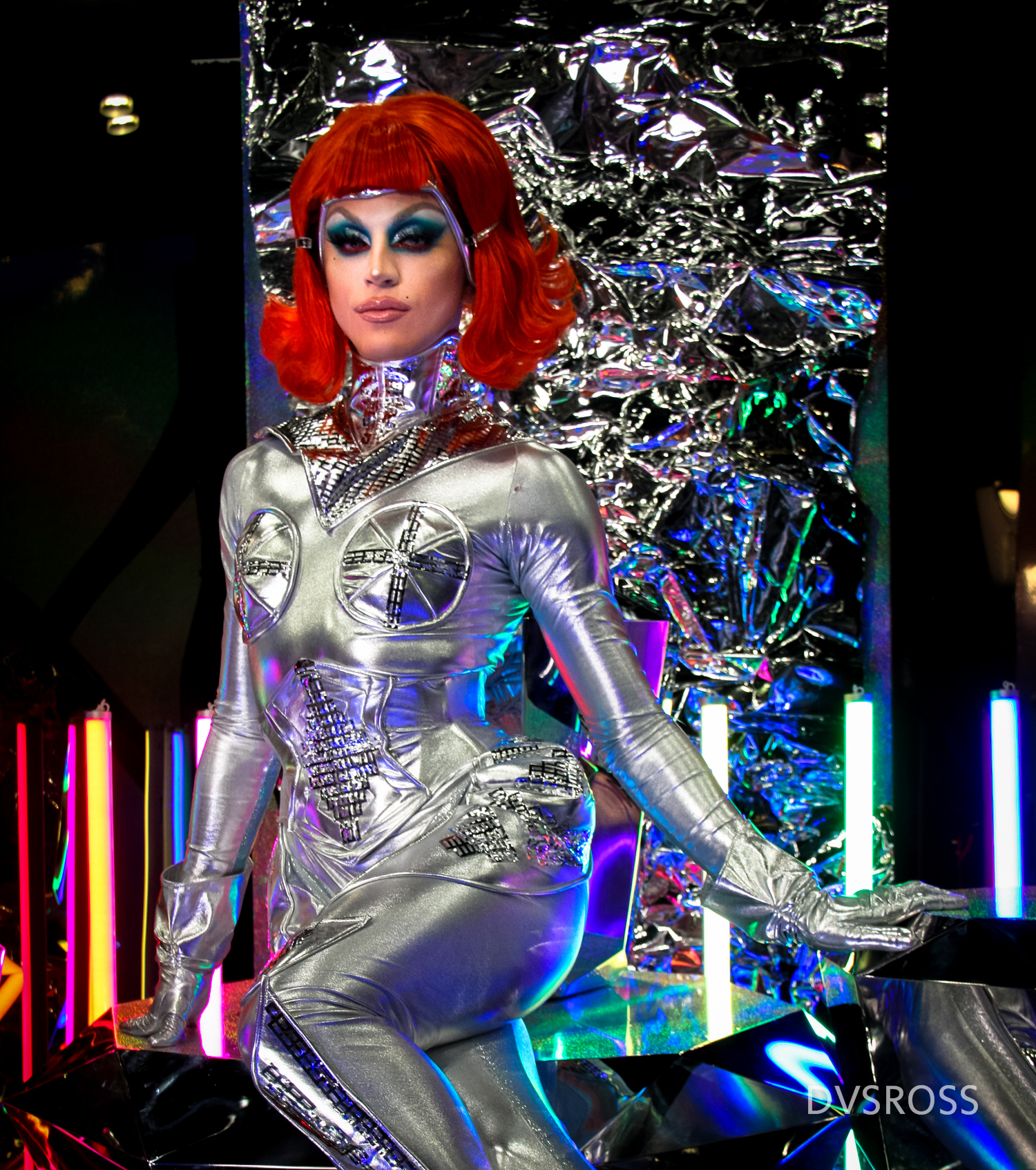
The episode sees Aquaria (pictured) named the season's winner.

All of the contestants return for the live grand finale. Monét X Change is announced as the season's Miss Congeniality. RuPaul then announces that the final four contestants will take part in a lip-sync tournament for the win.

The first lip-sync contest is between Asia O'Hara and Kameron Michaels, who perform to "Nasty" (1986) by Janet Jackson. Kameron Michaels wins the lip-sync and Asia O'Hara is eliminated from the competition. The second lip-sync contest is between Aquaria and Eureka, who perform to "If" (1993) by Janet Jackson. Both are declared winners of the lip-sync and move on to the final round.

The final lip-sync contest is between Aquaria, Eureka and Kameron Michaels, who perform to "Bang Bang" (2014) by Ariana Grande, Jessie J, and Nicki Minaj. Aquaria is declared the winner, making Eureka and Kameron Michaels the runners-up.

== Production and broadcast ==
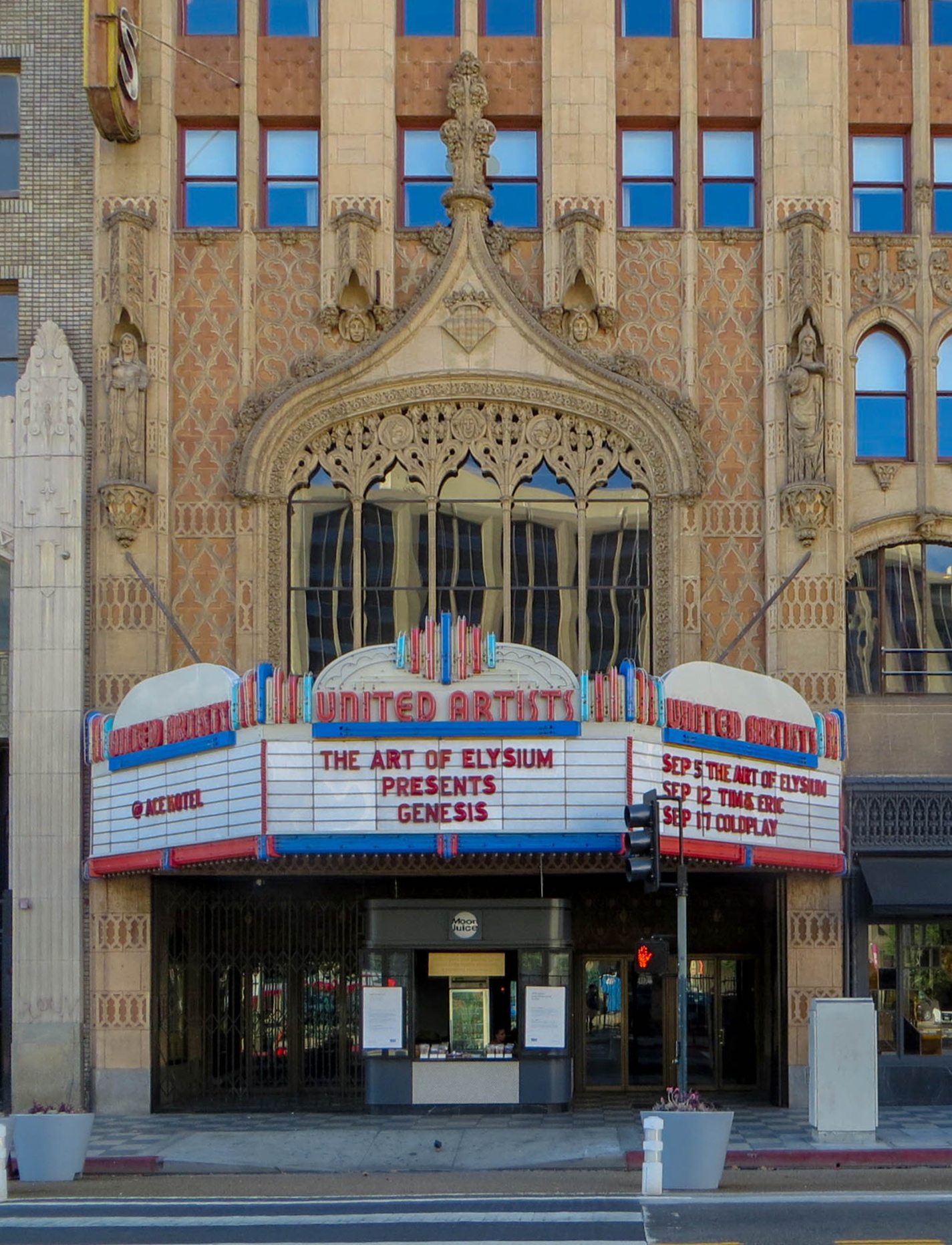
Exterior of the Ace Hotel in downtown Los Angeles in 2014

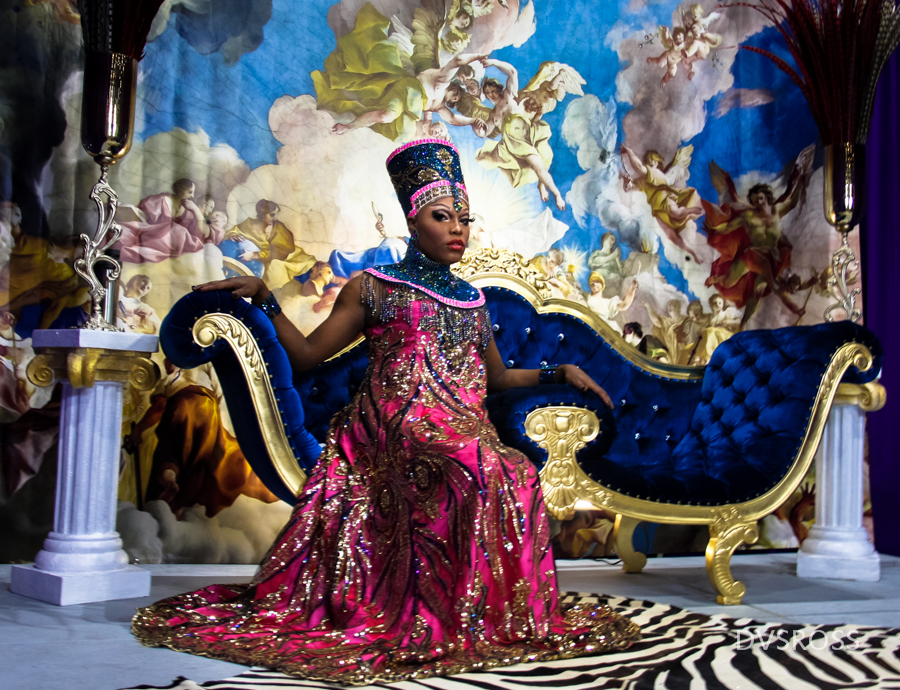
Asia O'Hara (pictured at RuPaul's DragCon LA in 2018) attempts to release flying butterflies during a lip-sync contest.

The episode was filmed at the Ace Hotel in downtown Los Angeles on June 8, 2018. It originally aired on June 28, 2018.

Asia O'Hara intended to release flying butterflies at various moments during "Nasty", but the stunt failed. D Magazine said the "dramatic monarch butterfly release fell flat". Sam Damshenas of Gay Times wrote, "The butterflies were obviously supposed to fly away, look cute and all that shit, but they just flopped to the ground, writhing in pain. The camera panned to shocked audience reactions (Monique's was our favourite) and close-ups of the butterflies. Very awkward." Following the performance, she released a statement that said in part, "Despite months of research and rehearsing with a professional company, it did not go as planned. I would like to publicly offer the entire world my deepest apology. It's important that everyone knows I would never purposely hurt any living being and have the utmost respect for all animals." The animal rights organization People for the Ethical Treatment of Animals (PETA) also released a statement about the stunt.

During "Bang Bang", the contestants included "fireworks, dress reveals, and confetti cannons", according to Billboard. Aquaria has said of her performance: "I wanted to give a very military moment with the look, and keep it simple, but make it fun. I wanted to give you pizzazz at the beginning, because I'm all about a little razzle-dazzle... And then the confetti cannons at the end, because, bitch, if they ain't going to shoot out confetti for me, I'll bring my own."

=== Fashion ===
Asia O'Hara's outfit during "Nasty" started with two large cones, which she removed. Her outfit and wig were also covered in colorful butterflies. During "If", Aquaria wore a "Gaultier-esque bodysuit, harkening back to Like a Virgin-era Madonna", according to Them magazine. For "Bang Bang", Aquaria wore a black leather and "gold star-spangled" outfit and Eureka wore a black-and-white outfit with "The Big Girl" emblazoned on the front.

== Reception ==
Oliver Sava of The A.V. Club gave the episode a rating of 'B+'. Sam Brooks ranked the "Nasty" performance number 160 in The Spinoff's 2019 "definitive ranking" of the show's 162 lip-sync contests to date. Brooks called the performance "the only lip-sync to involve the wanton slaughter of butterflies on live television". Cole Delbyck of HuffPost said the "Bang Bang" performance "proved Aquaria can not only turn a look but shut down a room".

Asia O'Hara was nominated in the Best Meme-Able Moment category for her failed butterfly stunt at the 2019 MTV Movie & TV Awards.
