= American (RuPaul's Drag Race) =

- RuPaul's Drag Race episode
- Episode no.: Season 10; Episode 12
- Presented by: RuPaul
- Original air date: June 14, 2018

Guest appearance
- Todrick Hall (guest judge)

Episode chronology
← Previous "Evil Twins"	Next → "Queens Reunited"
- RuPaul's Drag Race season 10

"American" is the twelfth episode of the tenth season of the American television series RuPaul's Drag Race. It originally aired on June 14, 2018. The episode's main challenge tasks the contestants with writing, recording, and performing choreography to original verses to RuPaul's song "American". Todrick Hall is a guest judge and choreographer. No contestant is eliminated from the competition, making the four remaining contestants finalists.

== Episode ==
The remaining four contestants—Aquaria, Asia O'Hara, Eureka, and Kameron Michaels—return to the room after Miz Cracker's elimination on the previous episode. Asia O'Hara tells the group she owes Miz Cracker an apology for her comment on the main stage. On a new day, RuPaul greets the group and reveals the main challenge, which tasks the contestants with writing, recording, and performing choreography to original verses to RuPaul's song "American". The contestants will also join RuPaul and Michelle Visage for interviews on the podcast RuPaul: What's the Tee?

The contestants write lyrics in the Werk Room, record vocals with Todrick Hall and audio engineers on the main stage, and join RuPaul and Visage for the podcast. The contestants then rehearse choreography with Hall and an assistant on the main stage. On elimination day, the contestants make final preparations in the Werk Room for the performance and fashion show. They discuss some of their best and worst moments in the competition.

On the main stage, RuPaul welcomes fellow judges Visage, Carson Kressley, and Ross Mathews, as well as guest judge Hall. RuPaul shares the assignment of the main challenge, then the performance commences. RuPau shares the runway category ("Final Four Eleganza Extravaganza"), then the contestants present their looks for the fashion show. The judges deliver their critiques. RuPaul asks the contestants to offer advice to younger versions of themselves, then to say why they should be named the winner. The judges deliberate, then share the results with the group. All four contestants are asked to lip-sync to "Call Me Mother" by RuPaul. None of the contestants are eliminated, making them season finalists.

== Production and broadcast ==
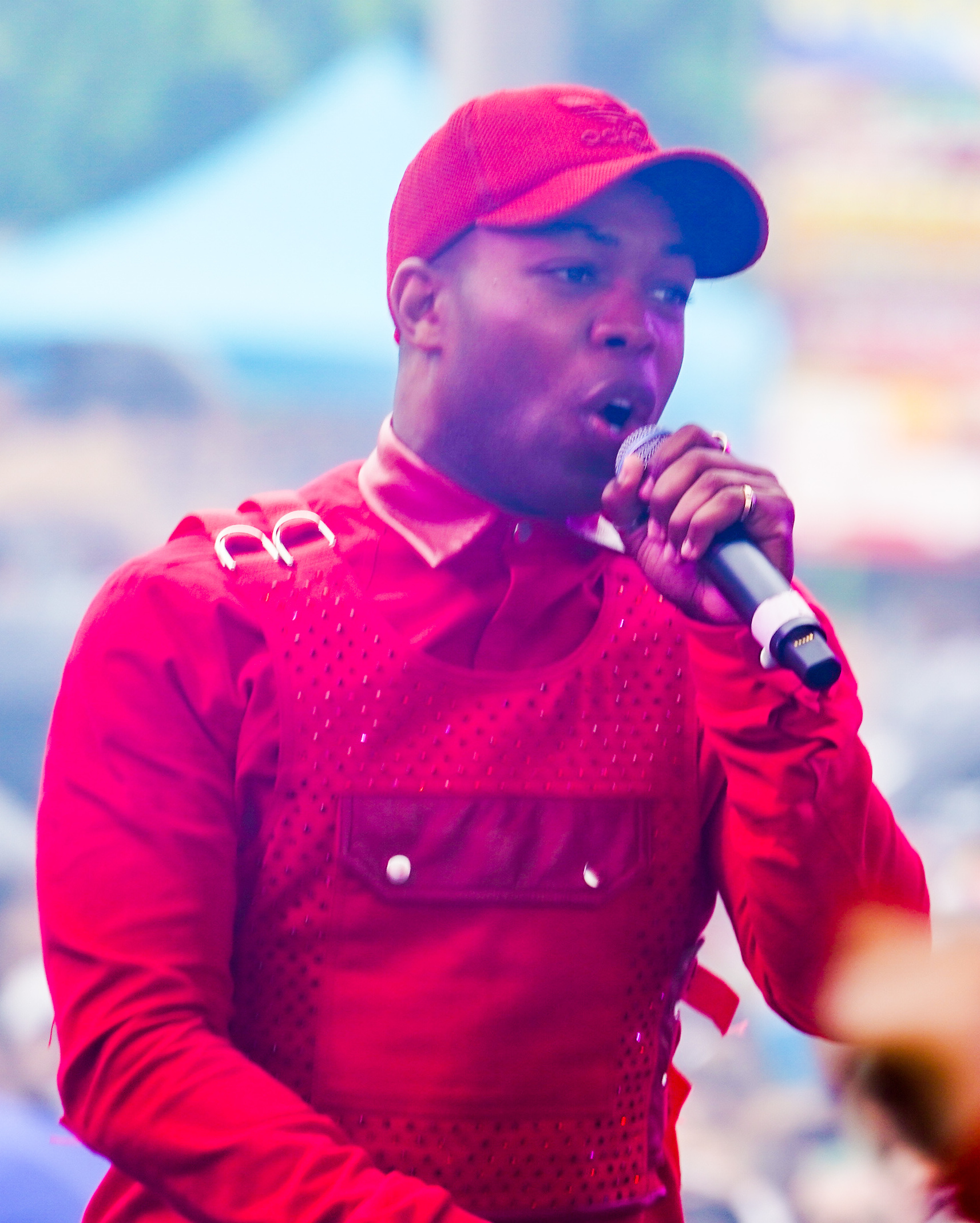
Todrick Hall (pictured in 2019) is a guest judge and choreographer.

The episode originally aired on June 14, 2018.

=== Fashion ===
For the performance, Aquaria wears a short red dress with matching high-heeled shoes and a brown wig. Asia O'Hara has a blue-and-yellow dress with feathers and a large brown wig. Eureka wears a black-and-blue outfit with a blonde wig styled as a ponytail. Kameron Michaels has a colorful outfit with fringe and a large red wig. For the fashion show, Aquaria wears a black dress with star accents, black gloves, and a long blonde wig. Asia O'Hara has a blue-and-gold Egyptian-inspired dress and a red wig. Kameron Michaels wears a lavender dress and a matching wig. Eureka has a white dress with black text, earrings resembling light bulbs, a headpiece, and a dark wig.

== Reception ==
Oliver Sava of The A.V. Club gave the episode a rating of 'B+' and said it "[spotlights] why each of these queens has made it this far". Writing for Vulture, Matt Rogers and Bowen Yang rated the episode four out of five stars. The version of "American" featuring the four contestants debuted at number 12 on Billboard‘s Dance/Electronic Song Sales charts. According to Nielsen Music, the track sold 2,000 downloads in the week ending June 21, 2018.
