= The Last Ball on Earth =

- RuPaul's Drag Race episode
- Episode no.: Season 10; Episode 4
- Presented by: RuPaul
- Original air date: April 12, 2018

Guest appearances
- Logan Browning (guest judge); Tisha Campbell (guest judge); Shawn Morales

Episode chronology
← Previous "Tap That App"	Next → "The Bossy Rossy Show"
- RuPaul's Drag Race season 10

"The Last Ball on Earth" is the fourth episode of the tenth season of the American television series RuPaul's Drag Race. It originally aired on April 12, 2018. Logan Browning and Tisha Campbell are guest judges. Aquaria wins the mini-challenge as well as the main challenge, which tasks contestants with creating three looks a climate change-themed ball. Dusty Ray Bottoms is eliminated from the competition, after placing in the bottom two and losing a lip-sync contest against Monét X Change to "Pound the Alarm" by Nicki Minaj.

== Episode ==
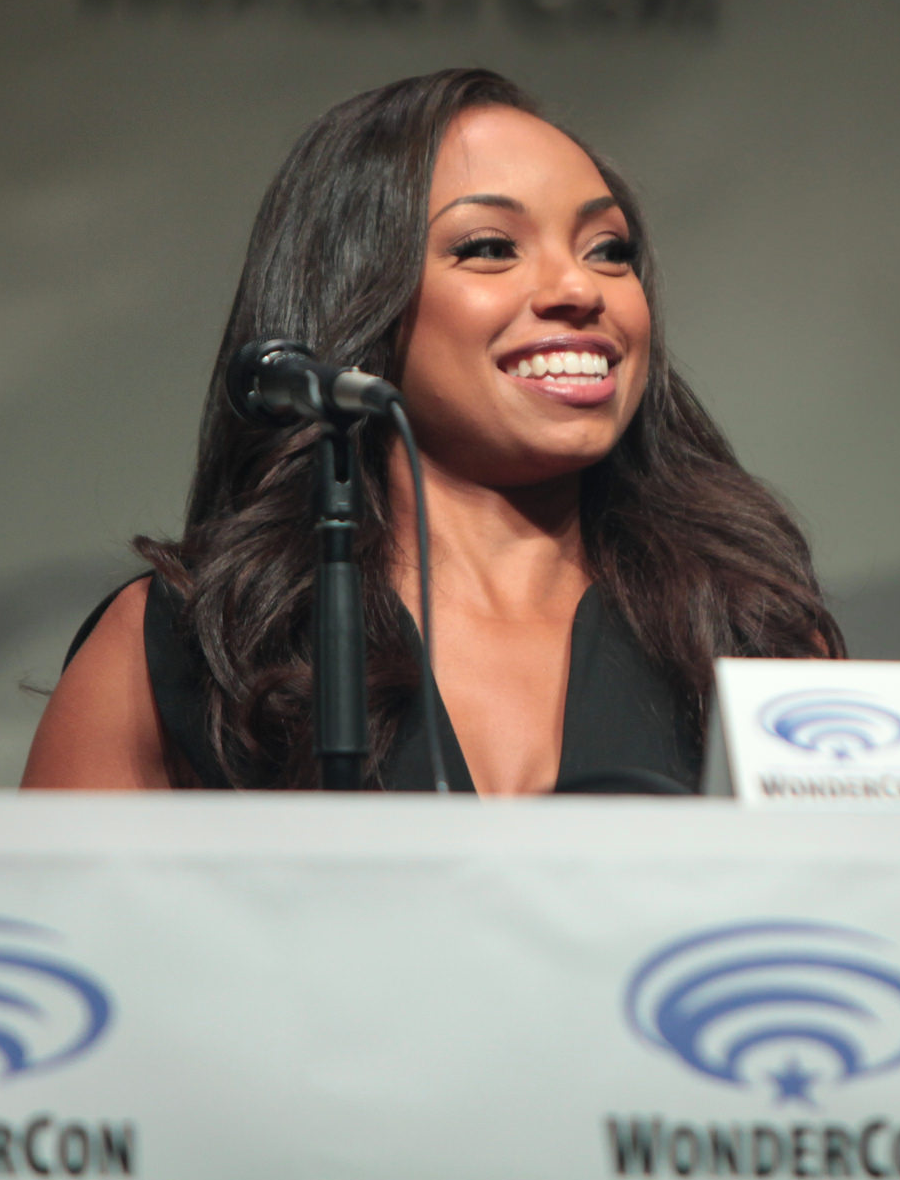
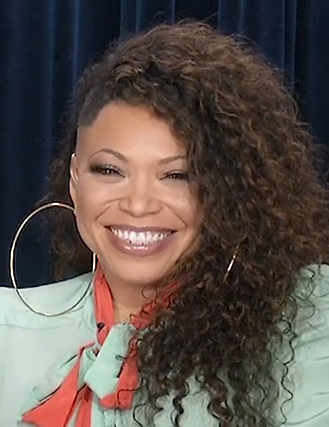
Logan Browning (left, pictured in 2015) and Tisha Campbell (right, pictured in 2018) are guest judges on the episode.

For this episode's mini-challenge, the contestants photobomb celebrity pictures. Aquaria is declared the winner. For the main challenge, the contestants are tasked with creating three looks for The Last Ball on Earth; the categories are "Alaskan Winter Realness", "Miami Summer Realness", and "Martian Eleganza Extravaganza". Climate change is the ball's theme.

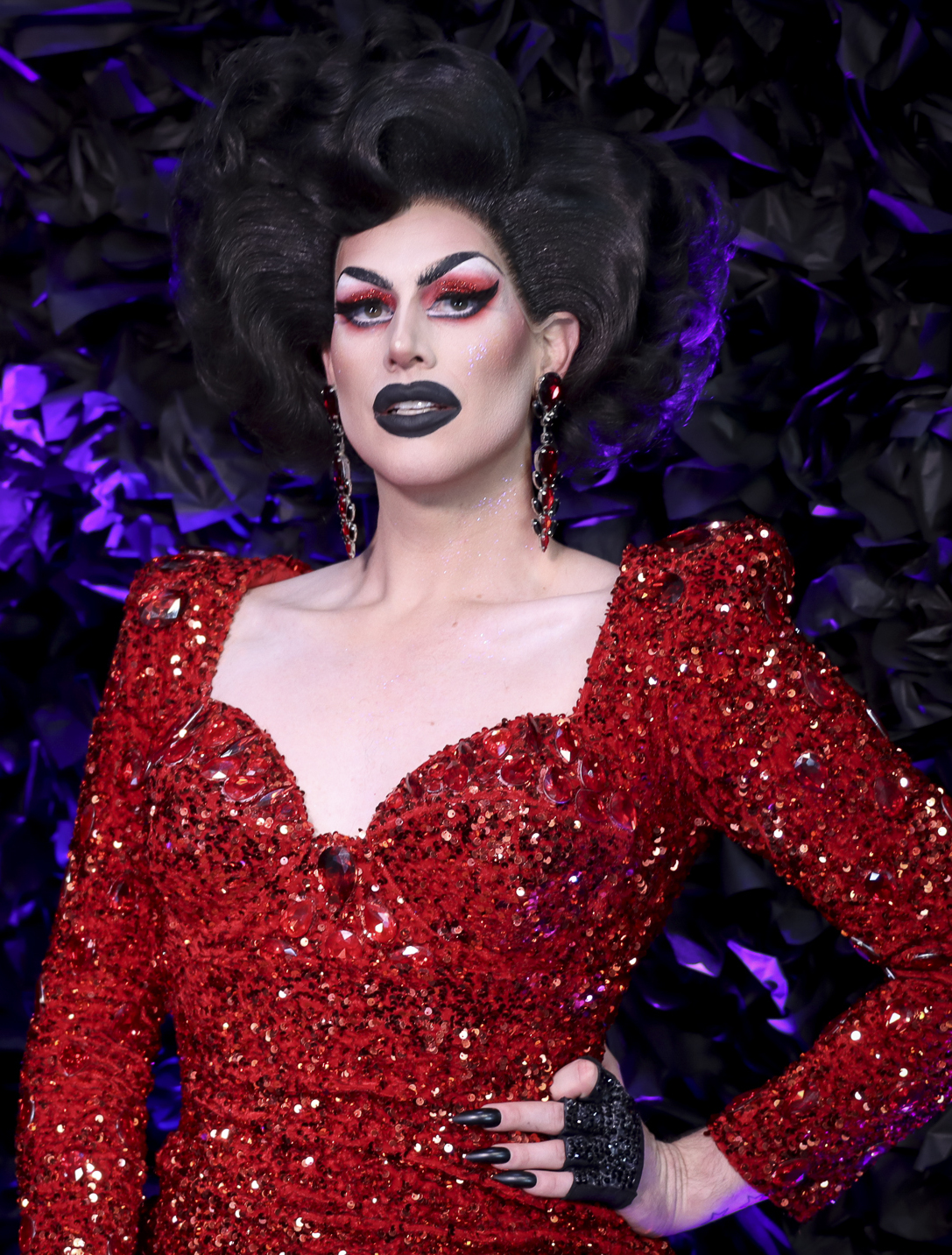
Dusty Ray Bottoms (pictured at RuPaul's DragCon LA in 2022) is eliminated from the competition.

Logan Browning and Tisha Campbell are guest judges. Aquaria wins the main challenge. Dusty Ray Bottoms and Monét X Change place in the bottom and face off in a lip-sync contest to "Pound the Alarm" (2012) by Nicki Minaj. Monét X Change wins the lip-sync and Dusty Ray Bottoms is eliminated from the competition.

== Production and broadcast ==
The episode originally aired on April 12, 2018.

Pit Crew member Shawn Morales assists with the mini challenge.

Sam Damshenas of Gay Times pointed out how the color of Monét X Change's shoes changed between shots of her runway showcase. During the lip-sync, Monét X Change does a death drop "fake out".

=== Fashion ===
RuPaul wears a Leigh Bowery-inspired outfit.

For the category "Alaskan Winter Realness", Aquaria wears a Luchador-inspired bikini. She designed the look as a student at the Fashion Institute of Technology. The outfit was created by the New York City-based design duo Dick and Virgil.

== Reception ==
Oliver Sava of The A.V. Club gives the episode a rating of 'B+'.

Sam Damshenas of Gay Times ranked two of Aquaria's outfits fifth and tenth in a list of the season's thirteen best runway looks. Screen Rant said RuPaul's outfit was the episode's most memorable. The website's Jessica Jalali included Aquaria's runway look in a 2021 list of the show's best ball challenge outfits and said she "was fully deserving of her challenge win in this episode".

Jack Ronan of The Tufts Daily called the lip-sync "epic". Damshenas described Dusty Ray Bottoms's performance as "entertaining" and "kooky" and Monét X Change's performance as "fierce". Vulture called Monét X Change's performance "game-changing". Michael Cuby of Them said her fakeout "continues to be unmatched". The "Pound the Alarm" contest ranked number 31 in The Spinoff's 2019 list of the show's 162 lip-syncs to date. In 2022, Bernardo Sim of Out magazine ranked the contest tenth in a list of the show's best lip-syncs with stunts.

== See also ==
- Climate change in popular culture
