= Snatch Game (RuPaul's Drag Race season 10) =

- RuPaul's Drag Race episode
- Episode no.: Season 10; Episode 7
- Presented by: RuPaul
- Original air date: May 3, 2018

Guest appearances
- Audra McDonald (guest judge); Kate Upton (guest judge); Bianca Del Rio; Alex Trebek

Episode chronology
← Previous "Drag Con Panel Extravaganza"	Next → "The Unauthorized Rusical"
- RuPaul's Drag Race season 10

"Snatch Game" is the seventh episode of the tenth season of the American television series RuPaul's Drag Race. It originally aired on May 3, 2018. The episode's main challenge tasks the contestants with impersonating celebrities during the Snatch Game. Audra McDonald and Kate Upton are guest judges. Former contestant Bianca Del Rio also makes a guest appearance and Alex Trebek appears in a video segment during the Snatch Game.

Aquaria wins the episode's main challenge. Monique Heart is eliminated from the competition after placing in the bottom and losing a lip-sync contest against The Vixen to "Cut to the Feeling" by Canadian singer Carly Rae Jepsen.

== Episode ==
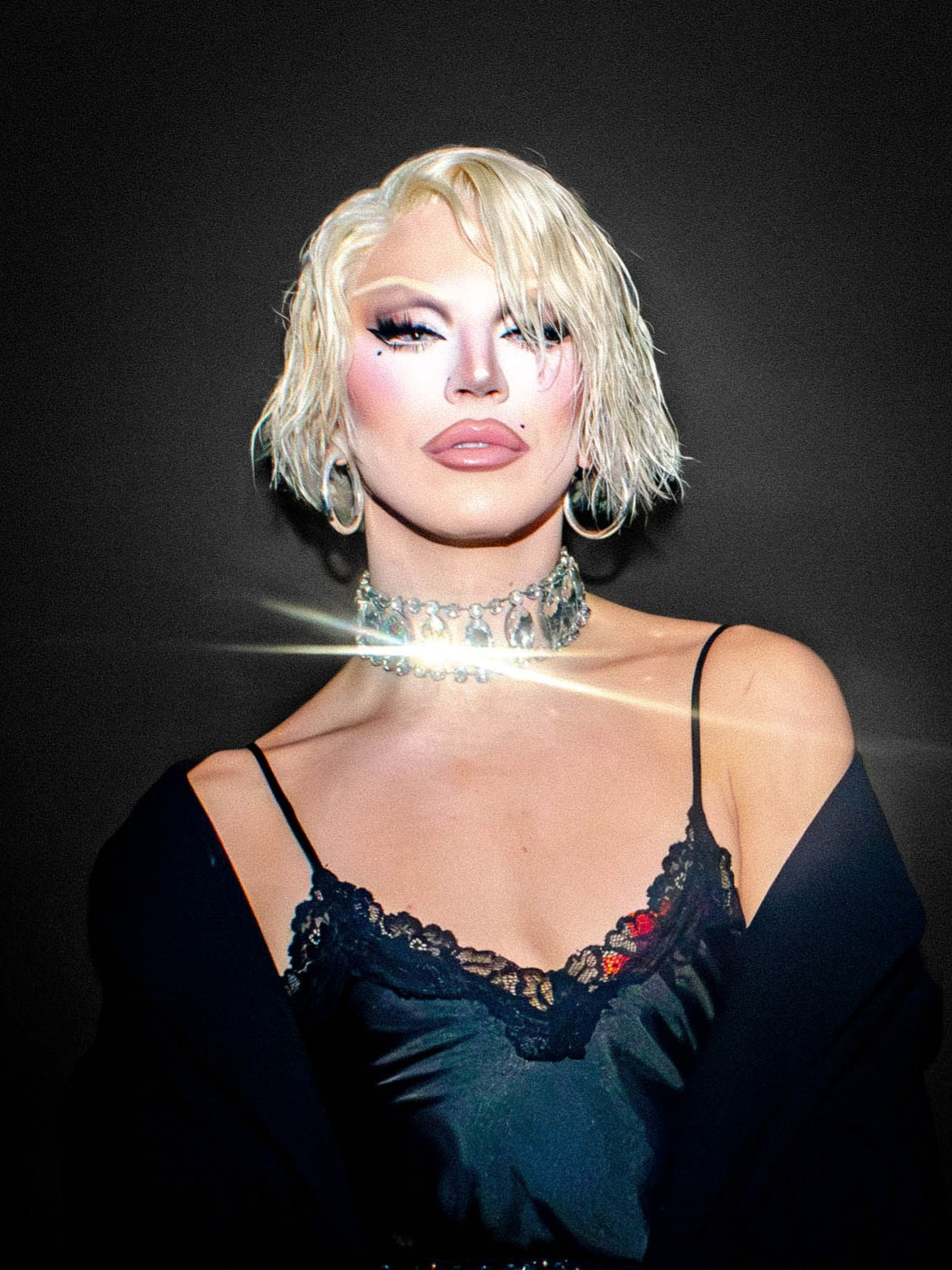
Aquaria wins the episode's main challenge.

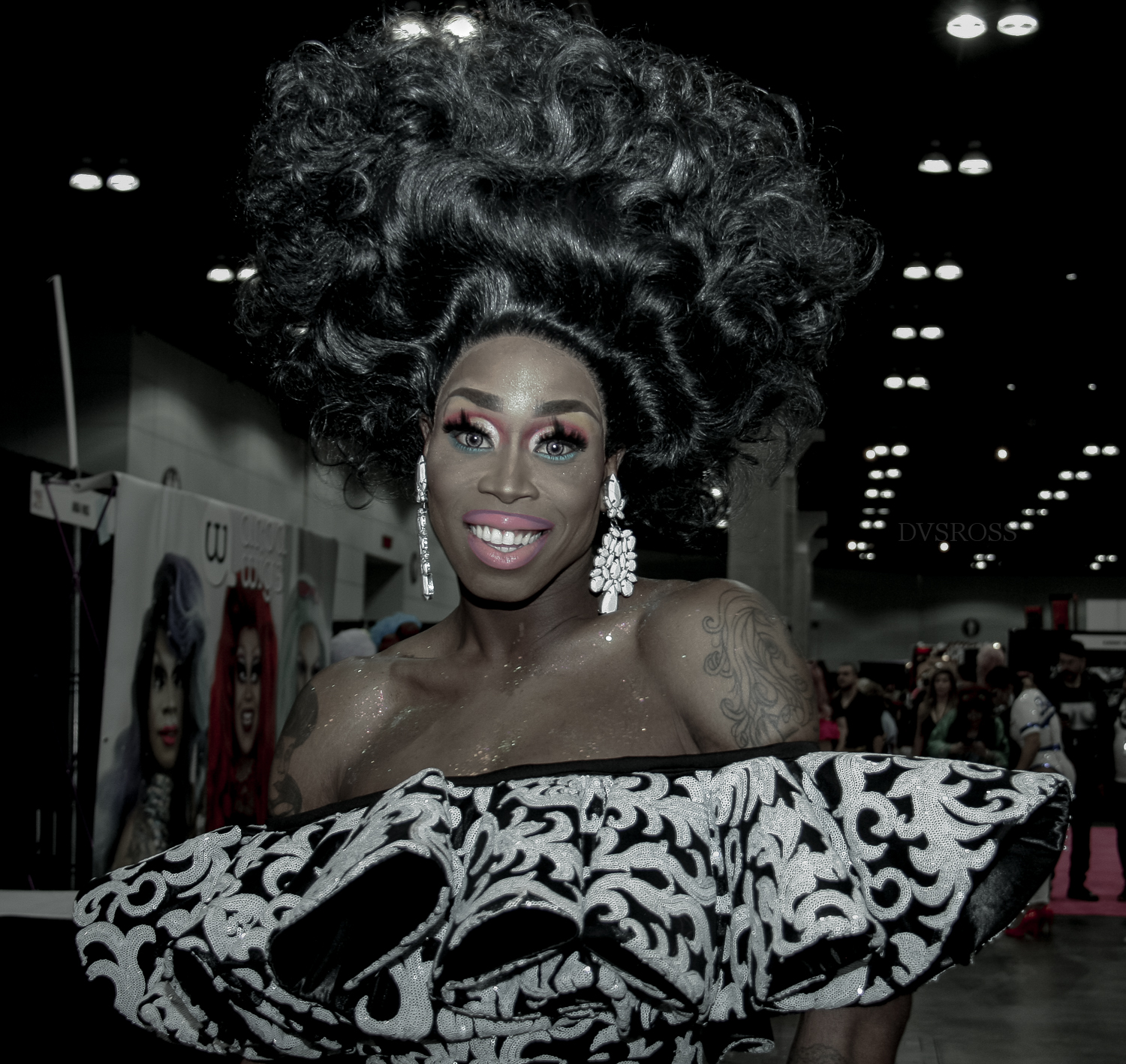
Monique Heart (pictured in 2019) is eliminated from the competition.

The contestants return to the Werk Room after Blair St. Clair's elimination on the previous episode. On a new day, RuPaul greets the group and reveals the mini-challenge, which tasks the contestants with "reading" (or playfully insulting) each other. Eureka wins the mini-challenge.

RuPaul then reveals the main challenge, which tasks the contestants with impersonating celebrities during the Snatch Game. The contestants begin to prepare for the challenge. RuPaul returns to the Werk Room with Bianca Del Rio. The two meet with each contestant, asking questions and offering advice. The contestants make final preparations, then the Snatch Game commences with Audra McDonald and Kate Upton as celebrity guests. Following are the contestants and impersonated celebrities:

- Aquaria as Melania Trump
- Asia O'Hara as Beyoncé
- Eureka as Alana "Honey Boo Boo" Thompson
- Kameron Michaels as Chyna
- Miz Cracker as Dorothy Parker
- Monét X Change as Maya Angelou
- Monique Heart as Maxine Waters
- The Vixen as Blue Ivy Carter

Alex Trebek appears in a video segment during the Snatch Game. Bianca Del Rio reappears at the end of the challenge, impersonating Judge Judy.

On elimination day, the contestants prepare for the fashion show. The group discuss how the challenge went, as well as drag performance related to politics. The Vixen talks about the challenges of being a Black and gay performer. On the main stage, RuPaul welcomes fellow judges Michelle Visage and Carson Kressley, as well as guest judges McDonald and Upton. RuPaul shares the assignment of the main challenge and the runway category ("Mermaid Fantasy"), then the fashion show commences.

After the contestants present their looks, the judges deliver their critiques. RuPaul asks the contestants to say who they think should be eliminated from the competition and why. After the contestants give their answers, the judges deliberate, then share the results with the contestants. Aquaria is declared the winner of the main challenge. Monique Heart and The Vixen place in the bottom and face off in a lip-sync contest to "Cut to the Feeling" (2017) by Carly Rae Jepsen. The Vixen wins the lip-sync and Monique Heart is eliminated from the competition. Monique Heart returns to the Werk Room to write a message on the mirror for the remaining contestants.

== Production and broadcast ==
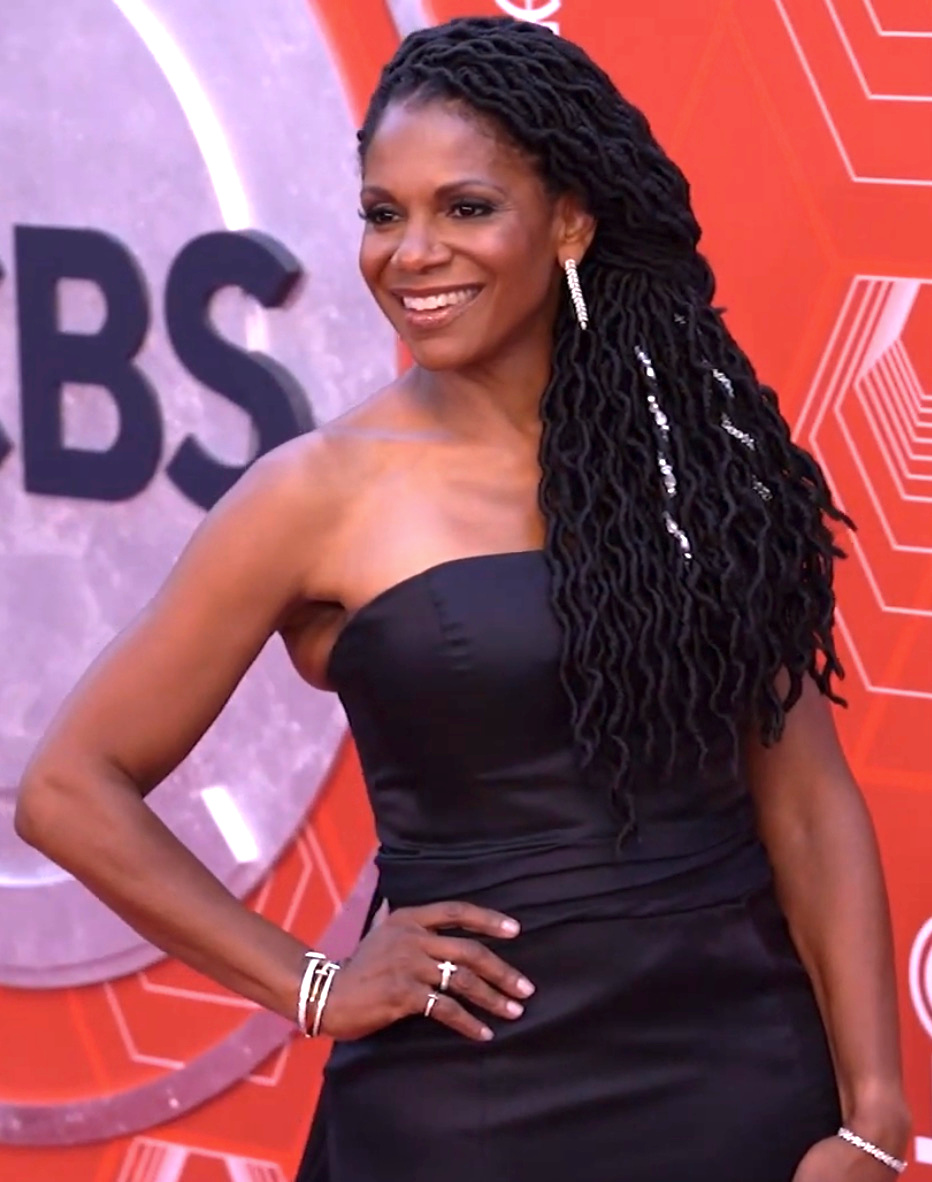
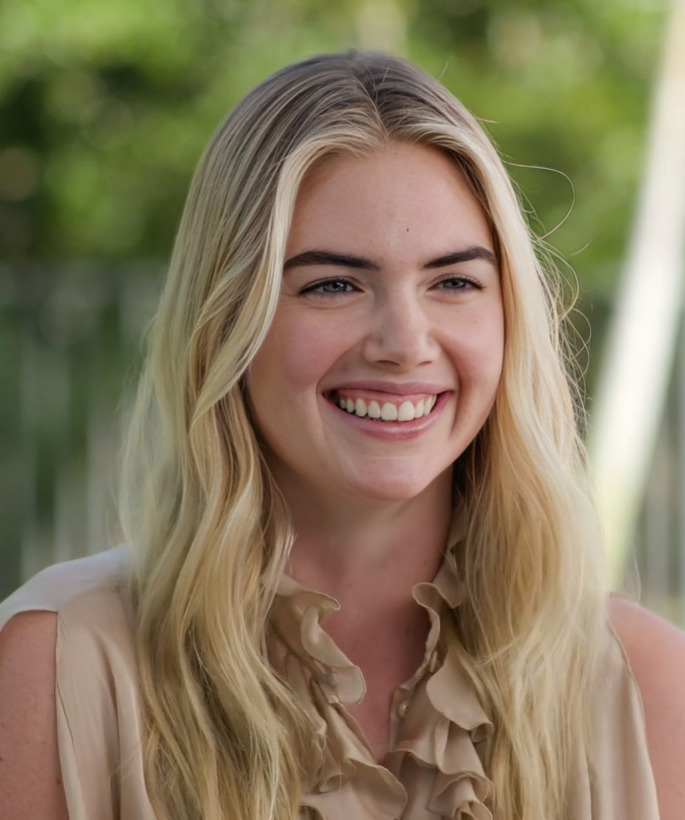
Audra McDonald (left, pictured in 2021) and Kate Upton (right, pictured in 2021) are guest judges.

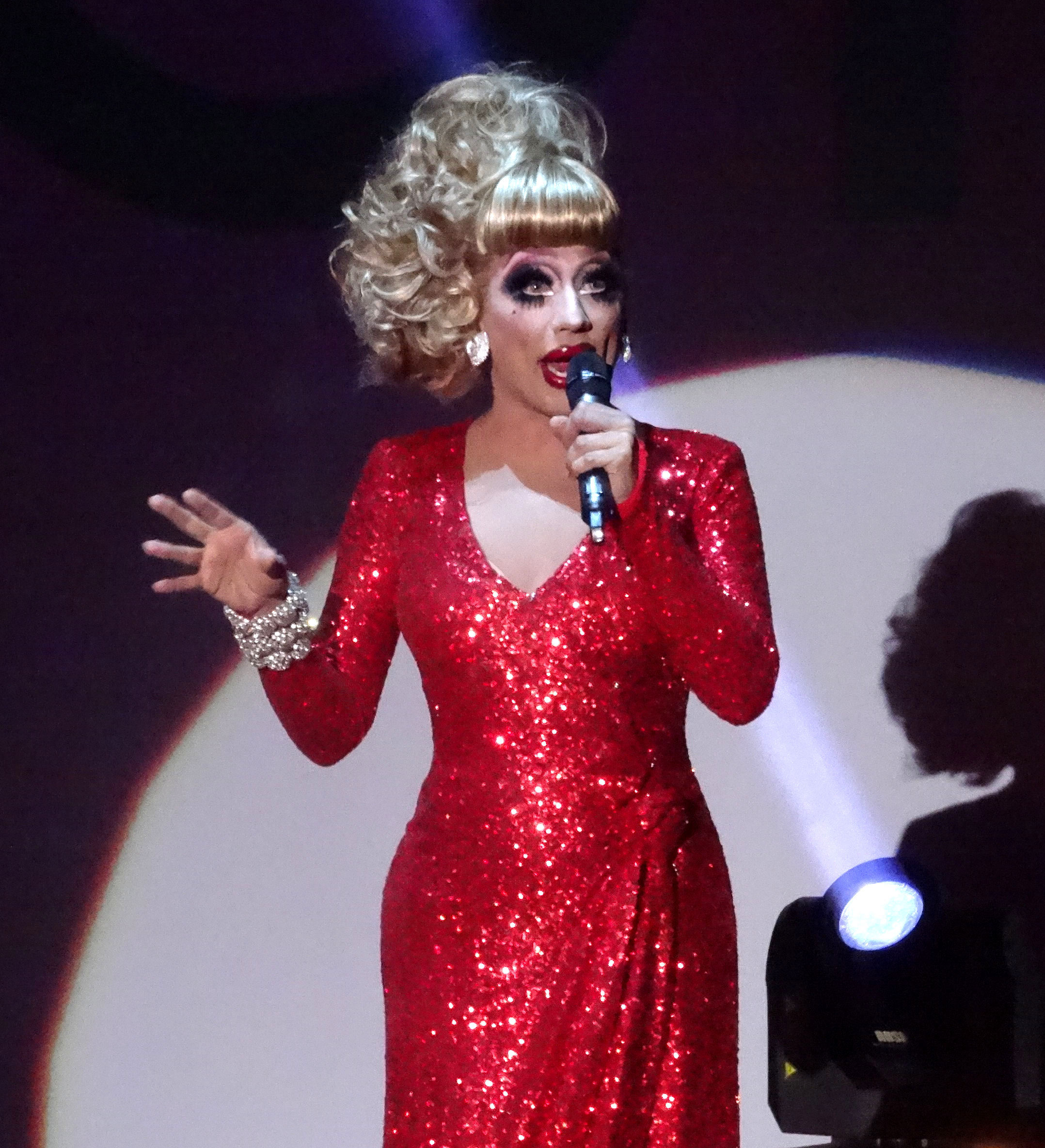
Bianca Del Rio makes a guest appearance.

The episode originally aired on May 3, 2018.

During the lip-sync, Monique Heart was unable to lip-sync because she did not know the song's lyrics. She also had issues with her wig.

=== Fashion ===
In the Werk Room and during the Snatch Game, RuPaul wears a plaid suit and a white dress shirt. On the main stage, RuPaul wears a black dress, black earrings, and a large blonde wig.

For the fashion show, the contestants resemble mermaids and are pushed around the stage in chairs by members of the Pit Crew. Monique Heart has a purple outfit and a matching wig. Miz Cracker has a colorful Barbie-inspired outfit with a pink wig and a crown. Aquaria has a black outfit resembling oil, blue tears streaming from her eyes, and a blonde wig. Asia O'Hara has a colorful outfit, a mask, and a multicolored wig. The Vixen has a reflective outfit with sequins and spray paint. Monét X Change has a warrior-inspired look with a prop and a white wig. Eureka has a black outfit and a large purple wig. Theatrical blood streams from her mouth. Kameron Michaels has a pink outfit and a green wig.

== Reception ==
Oliver Sava of The A.V. Club gave the episode a rating of 'A'. Writing for Vulture, Matt Rogers and Bowen Yang rated the episode three out of five stars. Kevin O'Keeffe ranked the "Cut to the Feeling" performance number 82 in INTO Magazine's 2018 "definitive ranking" of the Drag Race lip-syncs to date. Sam Brooks ranked the contest number 151 in The Spinoff's 2019 "definitive ranking" of 162 Drag Race lip-syncs.
