= The Unauthorized Rusical =

- RuPaul's Drag Race episode
- Contestants impersonating Cher for a live tribute in the episode. From left to right, Monét X Change, Aquaria, The Vixen, Kameron Michaels, Eureka, Miz Cracker, and Asia O'Hara
- Episode no.: Season 10; Episode 8
- Original air date: May 10, 2018

Guest appearances
- Billy Eichner (guest judge); Andrew Rannells (guest judge); Todrick Hall

Episode chronology
← Previous "Snatch Game"	Next → "Breastworld"
- RuPaul's Drag Race season 10

"The Unauthorized Rusical" is the eighth episode of the tenth season of the American reality competition television series RuPaul's Drag Race, which originally aired on VH1 on May 10, 2018. The episode's mini challenge has contestants attempt to get RuPaul to fake slap them. The main challenge tasks contestants with singing live a musical about Cher. Billy Eichner and Andrew Rannells are guest judges, alongside regular panelists RuPaul, Michelle Visage, and Carson Kressley. Kameron Michaels wins the main challenge and The Vixen is eliminated from the competition after placing in the bottom two and losing a lip-sync contest against Asia O'Hara to "Groove Is in the Heart" by Deee-Lite.

== Episode ==
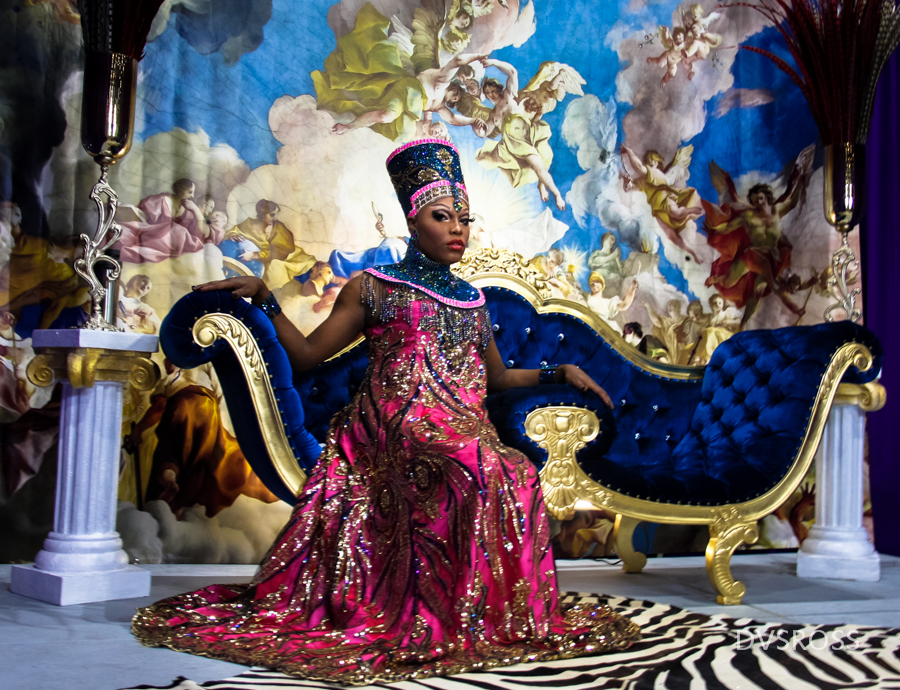
Asia O'Hara (pictured at RuPaul's DragCon LA in 2018) wins the episode's mini challenge.

The seven remaining contestants are asked by RuPaul to participate in an improv mini-challenge, called "Slap Out of It", that pastiches a similar scene from the finale of season two. Each queen has to try and make RuPaul fake slap them. Asia O'Hara, who is accidentally slapped for real by RuPaul, wins the mini-challenge.

For the main challenge, the contestants are tasked with performing and singing live in a tribute act to American singer and actress Cher, titled "Cher: The Unauthorized Rusical". The contestants portray Cher from different phases of her career: Aquaria as Disco Cher, Asia O'Hara as Movie Star Cher, Eureka as Rock Star Cher, Kameron Michaels as '60s Cher, Miz Cracker as Comeback Cher, and Monét X Change and The Vixen as Variety Show Cher. The contestants rehearse with Todrick Hall.

RuPaul introduces guest judges Billy Eichner and Andrew Rannells, and reveals the theme for the runway: "Glitterific". On the main stage, Monét X Change receives positive comments for her performance and mixed reviews for her runway look, conversely for both Eureka and Miz Cracker with their runway and performance; all three contestants are deemed safe. Kameron Michaels receives praise for both her runway look and Cher performance, and wins the main challenge. Aquaria, Asia O'Hara, and The Vixen are complimented for their runway looks, but their performances place them in the bottom three. Aquaria is declared safe, while Asia O'Hara and The Vixen face off in a lip-sync contest to "Groove Is in the Heart" (1990) by Deee-Lite. Asia O'Hara wins the lip-sync and The Vixen is eliminated from the competition.

== Production and broadcast ==
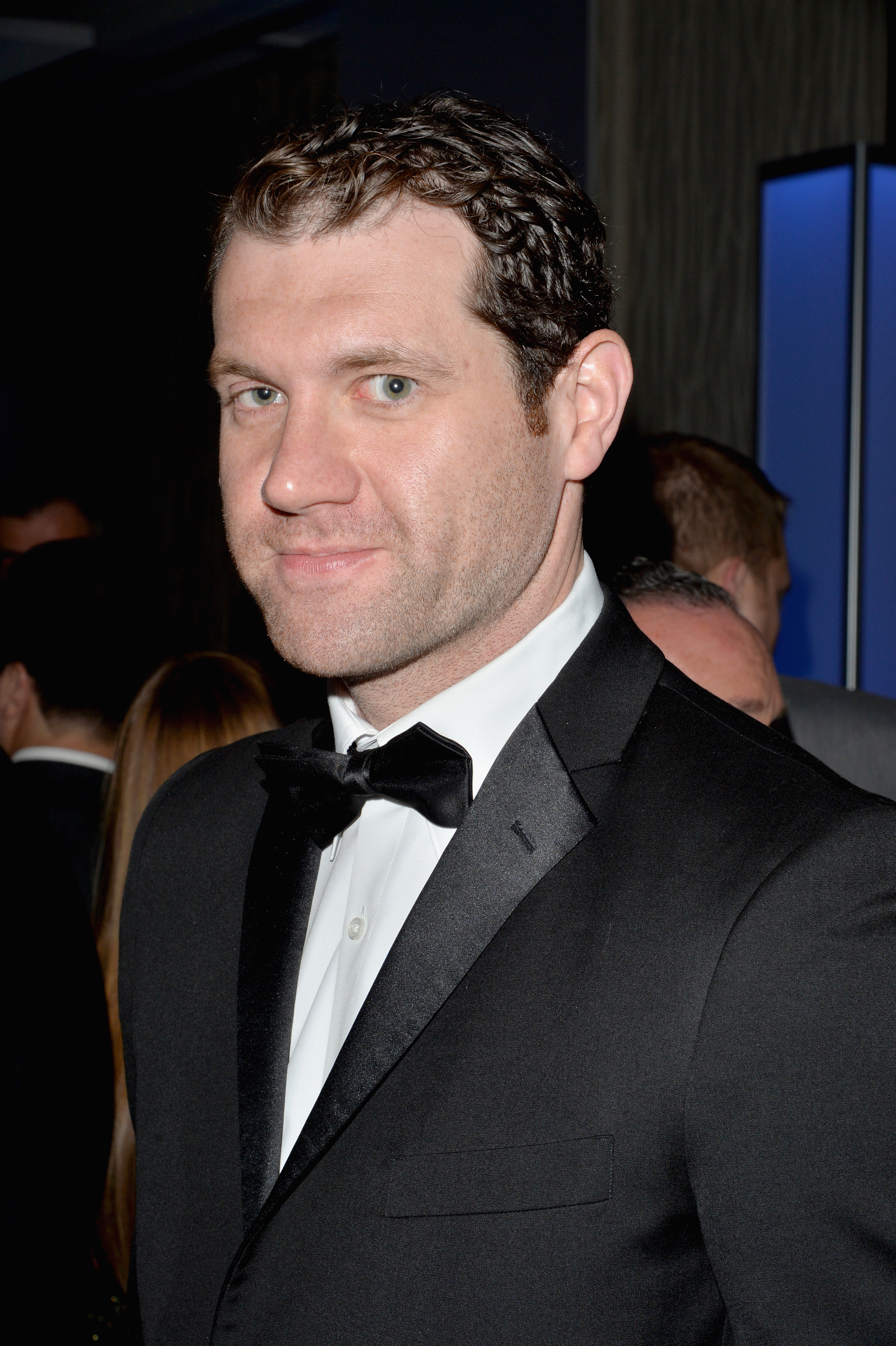
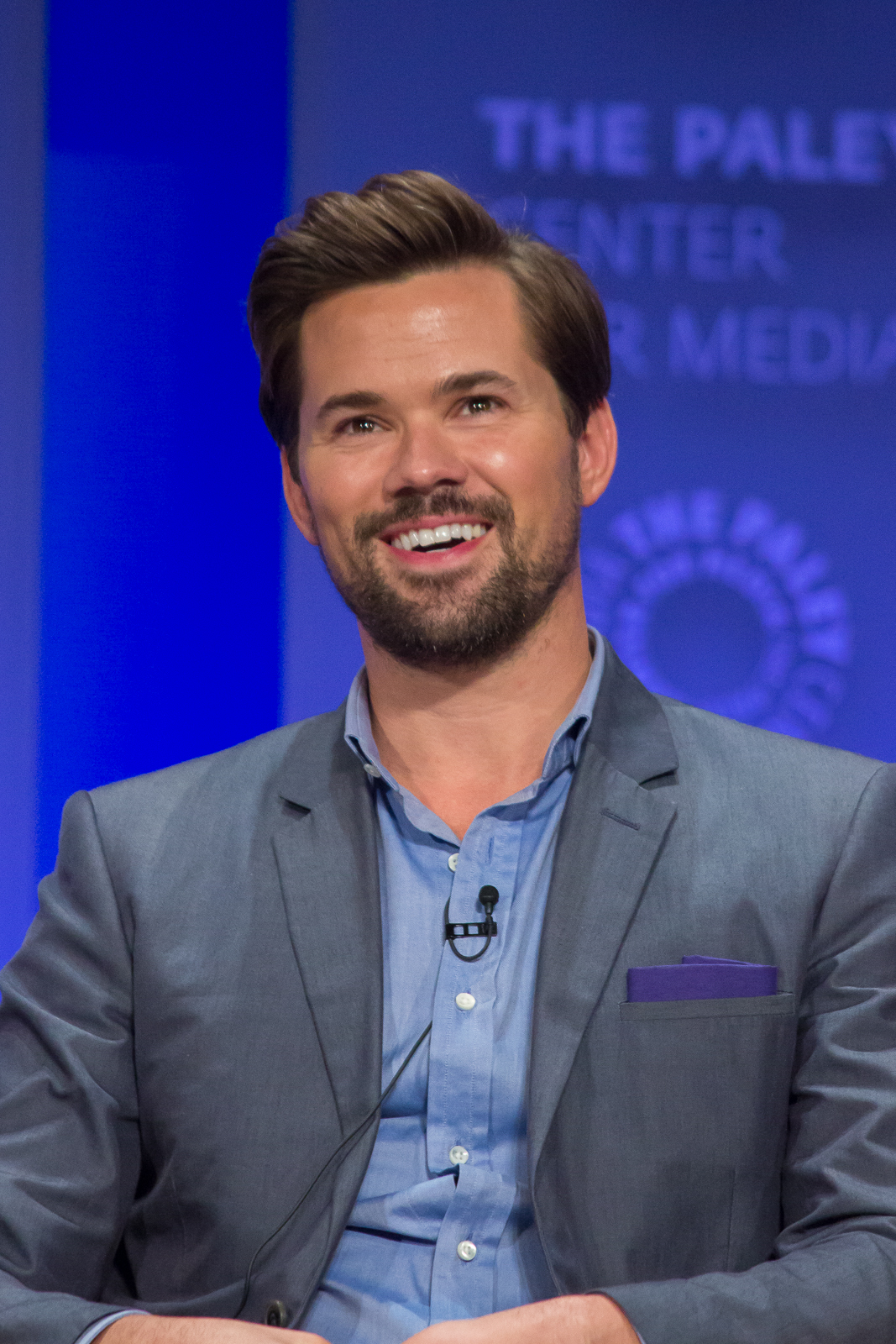
Billy Eichner (left, pictured in 2014) and Andrew Rannells (right, pictured in 2015) are guest judges.

The episode originally aired on May 10, 2018.

Cher appears in a recorded video on the episode.

== Reception ==
The mini challenge received a positive response. Oliver Sava of The A.V. Club said "Slap Out Of It" "might be the best Drag Race mini-challenge ever". Roby Abraham of Wussy Magazine said the mini challenge "may be the lowest budget mini challenge ever on Drag Race, but it was also one of the best".

Jared Richards ranked "Groove Is in the Heart" number 28 in Junkee's 2018 list of the show's 40 "most iconic" lip-syncs, writing: "If there was a song to lip sync to while dressed as Pennywise The Clown's gay cousin, it's 'Groove Is In The Heart', one of the most joyous songs to ever exist. Not even The Vixen's dabbing — a Drag Race first — could ruin the lip sync, as both queens embrace the song's weirdness, shifting between sexy moves to goofy air-drumming and stupid faces. Both are clearly having the best time, and it's infectious." Bernardo Sim of Screen Rant called the lip-sync "dramatic".

=== Rusical ===
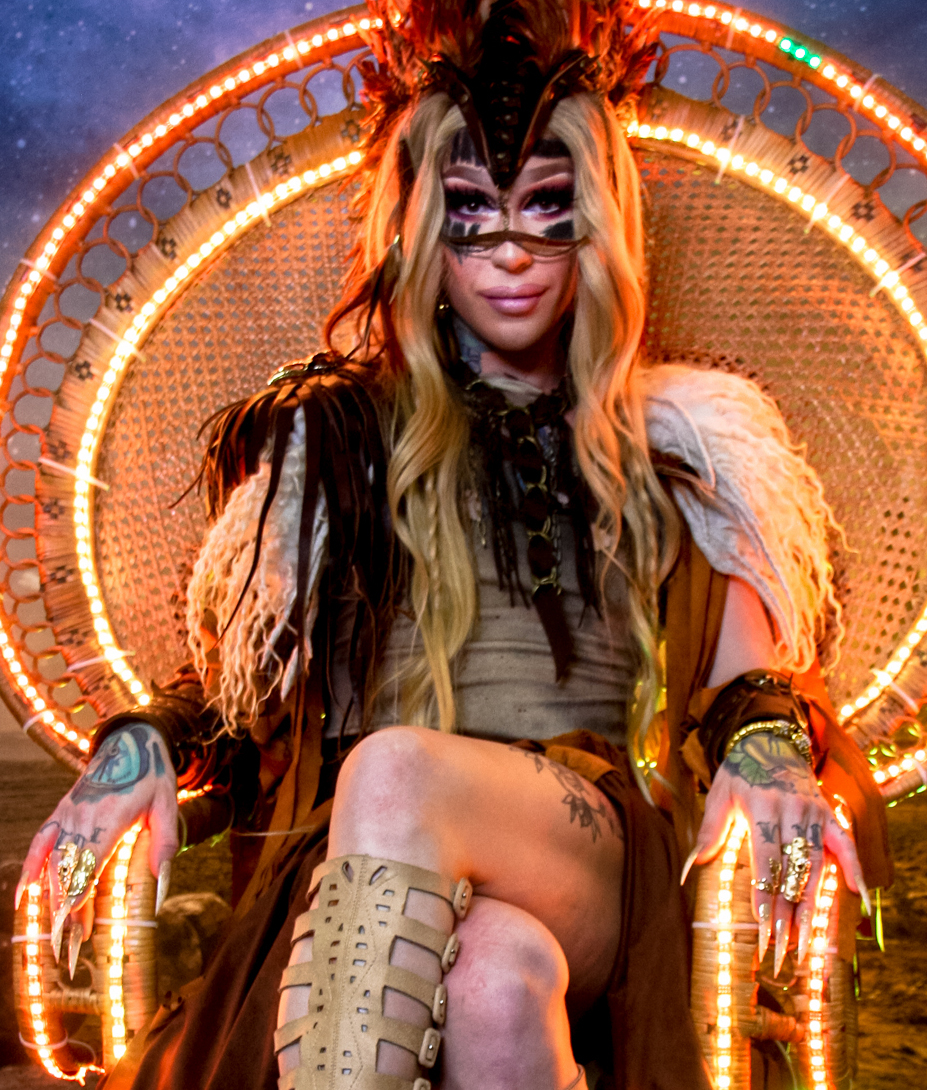
Kameron Michaels (pictured at RuPaul's DragCon LA in 2019) wins the episode's main challenge.

The Rusical has received a mixed reception. Sam Damshenas of Gay Times said of the Rusical: "It was one of the hardest challenges of the season (so far), because each queen performed choreography, impersonated Cher AND sung live. However, it all paid off in mother-tucking spades because it gave us one of the best Drag Race Rusicals so far." Yahoo! Entertainment's Lyndsey Parker said the musical "needs to go straight to Broadway and win all the Tonys. I could watch 'Cher: The Rusical' over and over, and I'd never want to snap out of it."

Brian Moylan of Vice said, "While I believe in life after love, I believe that asking these girls to sing in Cher: The Unauthorized Rusical was a bridge too far for our contestants. Usually in a singing challenge the girls that are tone deaf or can't carry a tune can squeak by performing a rap or some sort of poetry slam spoken word thing... But having them singing live while doing an impersonation of one of the most distinctive gay icons of the 20th century was probably a little too much to ask." Amanda Duarte of The New York Times wrote, "The Rusical should have been unauthorized by the producers of this program. The off-Cher (Sherm?) songs, the fact that none of the terrified, dead-eyed queens had ever done a Cher impression before, and the insane final number in which they attempted the Watusi in front of a bunch of glittery foamcore cockroaches added up to the kind of triple threat that warrants a restraining order. The whole thing was (TW: Cher puns) half-bred. I wanted to Silkwood-shower it off me. I wished I could turn back time. I cannot remember a worse challenge in the herstory of this show. I was moan-struck."

Sim of Screen Rant said the Rusical was among the show's worst in 2020. In 2023, Coleman Spilde of The Daily Beast wrote, "Miz Cracker simply saying 'vocoder' ... does often pop into my head more often than most intrusive thoughts." Barry Levitt of Vulture ranked the Rusical number 11 in a 2024 list, writing: "Thankfully, after the crummy PharmaRusical, season ten tried again with Cher: The Unauthorized Rusical with the top-seven queens. The difficulty level is the highest it’s ever been: Queens have to sing live while doing a Cher impersonation at the same time." Levitt opined, "The amount of talent on display here is awe-inspiring, providing a great breakout for Kameron Michaels, who sang beautifully and nailed the Cher of it all. Miz Cracker deserved more recognition for her number, which apparently was too Cher for the judges, but being too much is what Drag Race is all about." Stephen Daw ranked the musical thirteenth in Billboard's 2025 list of Rusicals to date. He wrote, "The format of this unauthorized Cher Rusical, along with some high-quality performances from the queens of season 10, make up for the music’s dip in quality."
