= Drag Con Panel Extravaganza =

- RuPaul's Drag Race episode
- Episode no.: Season 10; Episode 6
- Presented by: RuPaul
- Original air date: April 26, 2018

Guest appearances
- Emily V. Gordon (guest judge); Kumail Nanjiani (guest judge)

Episode chronology
| ← Previous "The Bossy Rossy Show" | Next → "Snatch Game" |
- RuPaul's Drag Race season 10

"Drag Con Panel Extravaganza" is the sixth episode of the tenth season of the American television series RuPaul's Drag Race. It originally aired on April 26, 2018. The episode's main challenge tasks the contestants with creating RuPaul's DragCon panels in front of a live audience. Emily V. Gordon and Kumail Nanjiani are guest judges. Eureka is the winner of the main challenge. Blair St. Clair is eliminated from the competition after placing in the bottom and losing a lip-sync contest against The Vixen to "I'm Coming Out" (1980) by Diana Ross.

== Episode ==
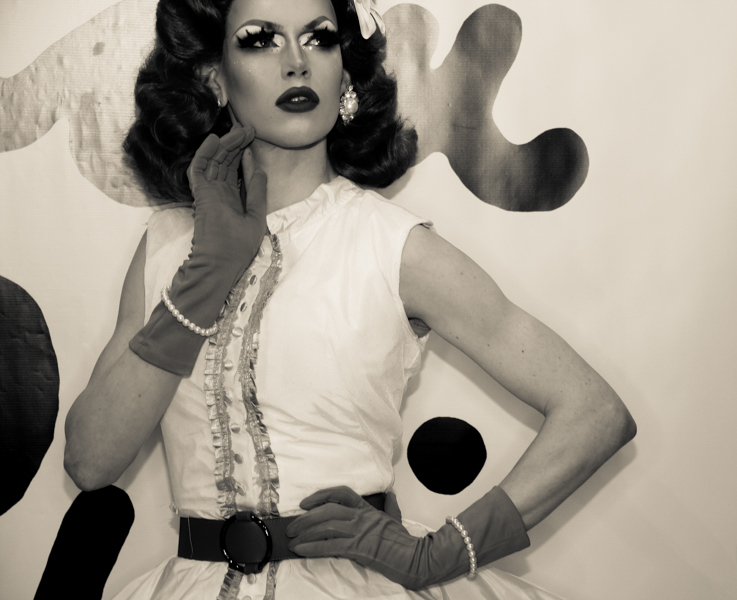
Blair St. Clair (pictured at RuPaul's DragCon LA in 2018) is eliminated from the competition.

The contestants return to the Werk Room after Mayhem Miller's elimination on the previous episode. On a new day, RuPaul greets the group and reveals the mini-challenge ("Sitting on a Secret"), which tasks the contestants with identifying various objects by sitting on them. The objects are a fax machine, an eggplant, a traffic cone, a bag of chips, a pork chop, marshmallows, a fish, and a cake. Asia O'Hara is declared the winner.

RuPaul then reveals the main challenge, which tasks the contestants with creating and producing RuPaul's DragCon panels in front of a live audience. The contestants select the following teams and topics:

- Team Body: Eureka, Kameron Michaels, and Monét X Change
- Team Face: Aquaria, Asia O'Hara, and Monique Heart
- Team Hair: Blair St. Clair, Miz Cracker, and The Vixen

The groups start to brainstorm. RuPaul returns to the Werk Room to meet with each team, asking questions and offering advice. Before leaving, RuPaul reveals who the guest judges are and how the audience will provide feedback. On elimination day, the contestants make final preparations for the panels and fashion show. Kameron Michaels talks about being a drag queen and having a muscular body. Monét X Change talks about hiding that she does drag from select family members and winning a drag pageant.

On the main stage, RuPaul welcomes fellow judges Michelle Visage and Ross Mathews, as well as guest judges Emily V. Gordon and Kumail Nanjiani. RuPaul shares the assignment and runway category ("Hats Incredible"), then the contestants present the panels. After the contestants present their looks in the fashion show, the judges deliver their critiques. Blair St. Clair gets emotional talking about her experience being raped. The judges deliberate, then share the results with the group. Eureka is declared the winner of the main challenge. Blair St. Clair and The Vixen place in the bottom and face off in a lip-sync contest to "I'm Coming Out" (1980) by Diana Ross. The Vixen wins the lip-sync and Blair St. Clair is eliminated from the competition.

== Production and broadcast ==
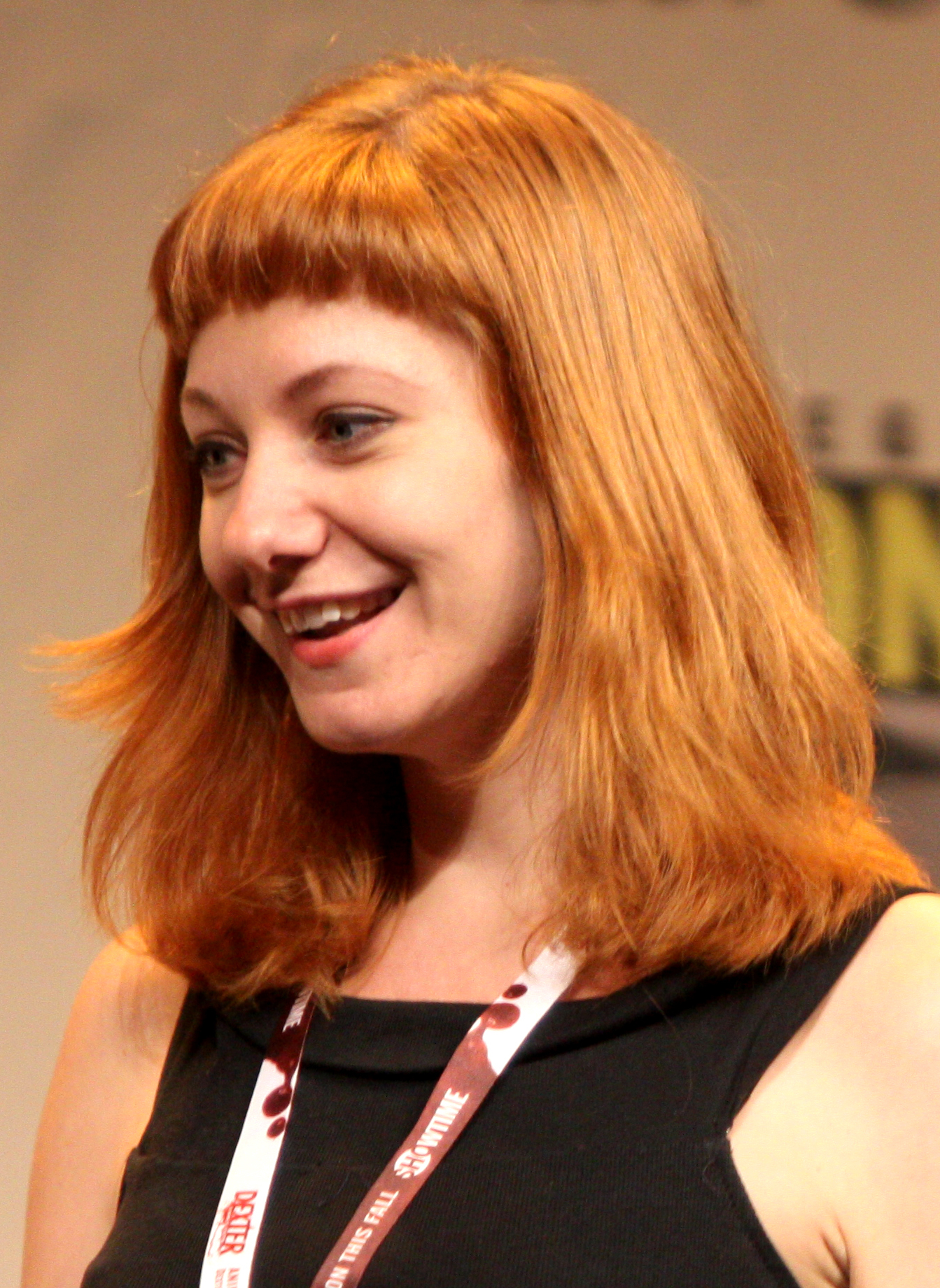
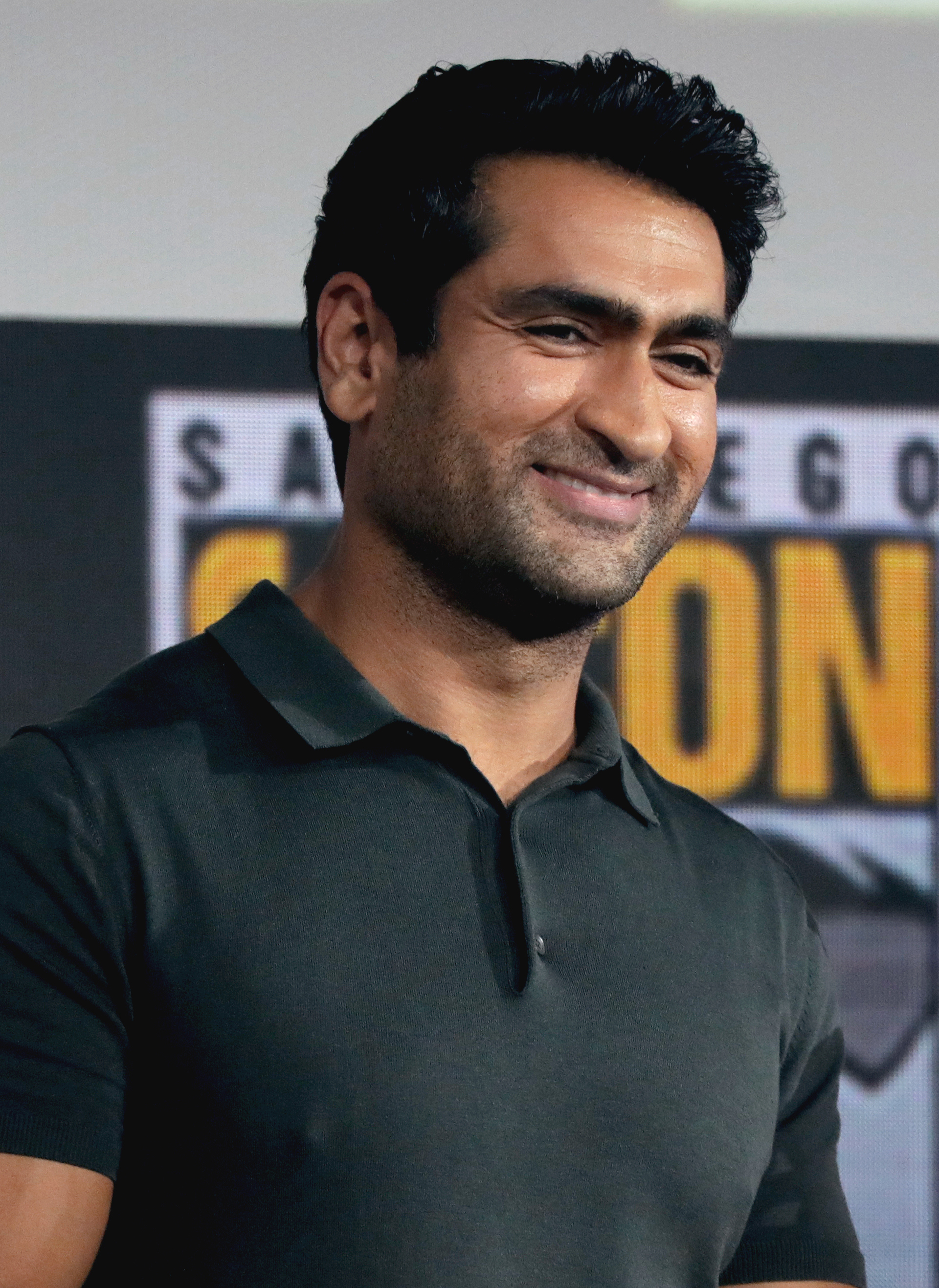
Emily V. Gordon (top, pictured in 2012) and Kumail Nanjiani (bottom, pictured in 2019) are guest judges.

The episode originally aired on April 26, 2018.

Brian Moylan of Vice News said of the lip-sync contest: "While The Vixen was doing flips and drops and hustles all over the stage and really feeling 'I'm Coming Out' by Diana Ross, Blair was giving us a very safe and expected performance." Writers for Metrosource said, "Blair brings a lot of raw energy and intention to her performance, and it's clearly a meaningful song for her to embody after revealing her story, but she's no match for The Vixen's seemingly endless series of flips, drops and splits."

=== Fashion ===
For the main stage, RuPaul wears a pink dress and a large blonde wig. For the fashion show, the contestants wear hats. Kameron Michaels has a space-inspired purple-and-silver outfit with a spinning headpiece. Monét X Change has a colorful outfit with a matching hat and pink high-heeled shoes. Eureka has a black-and-white outfit with tall black boots and a black cape. Aquaria has a black-and-white outfit with a bow tie, bunny ears, a magician's hat, and a cane. Monique Heart has a sparkly outfit with a large blonde wig. Asia O'Hara has a large headpiece reminiscent of a dandelion. Miz Cracker has a white dress with pink bows. Her "hat" is her blonde wig with a pink bow. Blair St. Clair has a short white dress inspired by Hello, Dolly! and other Broadway musicals, as well as the Kentucky Derby. The Vixen also has a black-and-white dress with a large floppy hat.

== Reception ==
Oliver Sava of The A.V. Club gave the episode a rating of 'A-'. Andy Swift of TVLine said Blair Sr. Clair "was simply no match for Vixen's gymnastics and air-trumpet skills (even if it looked like she was playing the saxophone half the time)". Gay Times ranked Asia O'Hara's look seventh in a 2018 overview of the thirteen best runway looks from the season. Sam Brooks ranked the "I'm Coming Out" performance number 98 in The Spinoff's 2019 "definitive ranking" of the show's 162 lip-sync contests to date.

== See also ==
- RuPaul's DragCon LA
- RuPaul's DragCon NYC
