= Yuhua Hamasaki =

Chinese-born American drag queen

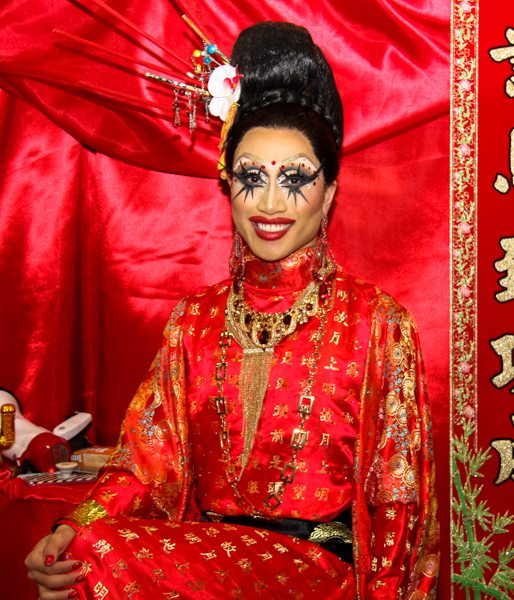
- Yuhua at RuPaul's DragCon LA, 2018
- Born: Yuhua Ou; March 1, 1990 (age 36); Guangzhou, Guangdong, China
- Education: Pace University (BA)
- Occupations: Drag queen; singer; actor
- Years active: 2002–present

Yuhua Hamasaki, or simply known as Yuhua, is the stage name of Yuhua Ou, a Chinese-born American drag queen, singer, actor and reality television personality who came to international attention on the tenth season of RuPaul's Drag Race and later the first season of Drag Race Philippines: Slaysian Royale.

== Early life ==
Ou was born on March 1, 1990, in Guangzhou. She moved to Chinatown, Manhattan in New York City when she was seven and started doing drag on the club kid scene under the name Yuhua. She later added Hamasaki after Japanese idol Ayumi Hamasaki. Ou holds a business management degree from Pace University.

== Career ==
Before Drag Race, Yuhua was one of several drag queens appearing in Katy Perry's performance of "Swish Swish" on Saturday Night Live in May 2017. She also designed outfits for other Drag Race alum prior to her appearance on the series, including Aquaria, Bob the Drag Queen, Peppermint, Aja, Jiggly Caliente, Alexis Michelle and Monét X Change. She has won multiple pageant titles including Miss Fire Island, Miss Fire Island All Stars, Miss Stonewall, and Miss Asia NYC.

Yuhua was announced as one of fourteen contestants for the tenth season of RuPaul's Drag Race in 2018. Due to the popularity of Monét X Change's sponge dress in episode one, Yuhua created her own sponge dress for sale, and donated the proceeds to Callen-Lorde. She was eliminated in the third episode after losing a lip sync to "Celebrity Skin" by Hole against Mayhem Miller.

After Drag Race, Yuhua appeared with Laverne Cox in the music video for "Bruised" by Mila Jam. She appeared in a commercial for VH1's It Gets Better project, supporting LGBTQ youth. She was also in the video for Trinity the Tuck's "I Call Shade" in February 2019.

Yuhua received notoriety from her self-published series Bootleg Fashion Photo RuView on YouTube based on the WOWPrsents internet series Fashion Photo RuView with Raja and Raven. She reviewed the runway looks of the All-Stars four cast starting on December 4, 2018, with Biblegirl666. She started covering the season eleven looks on February 22, 2019, with Blair St. Clair. Other guests on the series have included Jaymes Mansfield, Cynthia Lee Fontaine, Dusty Ray Bottoms, Jessica Wild, Laganja Estranja, Jiggly Caliente, Vivacious, Alexis Michelle, Phi Phi O'Hara, Trinity the Tuck and Honey Davenport. She filled in for an episode of the actual Fashion Photo RuView on November 24, 2018, with Eureka O'Hara.

Yuhua was a guest at the 2019 Life Ball, alongside Alaska Thunderfuck.

In June 2019, Yuhua was one of 37 queens to be featured on the cover of New York Magazine. The same month, World of Wonder announced that she was set to appear in her own webseries, Sew What?, which aimed to "give viewers tips on how to construct a garment from start to finish". The series aired six episodes from November to December 2019.

She has also been described as a "seamstress, dancer and comedian".

=== Music ===
In 2018, Yuhua released her first single "The Ankh Song" named after her runway look from episode one resembling an Ankh, noted by the judges. A music video was released on April 5, 2018.

== Personal life ==
Yuhua is non-binary and uses she/her pronouns both in and out of drag. She resides in New York City.

== Filmography ==
Year	Title	Role	Ref
2019	Guys at Parties Like It	Conner	

=== Television ===
Year	Title	Role
2012	Big Ang	Drag Queen
2013	The Carrie Diaries	Drag Queen
2014	Blue Bloods	Drag Queen
2015	The Mysteries of Laura	Drag Queen
2017	Saturday Night Live	Drag Queen
2018	RuPaul's Drag Race (season 10)	Contestant (12th place)
2018	RuPaul's Drag Race: Untucked (season 10)	Herself
2018	Shade: Queens of NYC	Herself
2021	The Mind, Explained	Herself
2022–2023	And Just Like That...	Drag Queen
2025	Drag Race Philippines: Slaysian Royale	Contestant (6th place)

=== Music videos ===
Year	Title	Ref
2010	"I'm Gonna Sh*t My Pants" – Sherry Vine	
2011	"Make Me Moan" – Sherry Vine ft. Peppermint	
2018	"The Ankh Song" – Yuhua Hamasaki	
2018	"Bruised" – Mila Jam	
2019	"I Call Shade" – Trinity the Tuck	

=== Web series ===
Year	Title	Role	Ref
2018	Cosmo Queens	Guest	
2018	Fashion Photo RuView	Guest host	
2018–Present	Bootleg Opinions (formerly Bootleg Fashion Photo RuView)	Host	
2018	Drag Queens React	Guest	
2019	Out of the Closet	Herself	
2019	Localish (Potluck Premiere)	Herself	
2019	Sew What?	Host	
2020	The Pit Stop	Herself	
2023	Glam Slam	Herself	

== Discography ==
=== Singles ===
Year	Title
2018	"The Ankh Song"

== See also ==
- Chinese people in New York City
- LGBTQ culture in New York City
- List of LGBTQ people from New York City
