= RuPaul's Drag Race season 10 =

2018 season of RuPaul's Drag Race

RuPaul's Drag Race
- Season 10
- Promotional poster for season ten
- Hosted by: RuPaul
- Judges: RuPaul; Michelle Visage; Carson Kressley; Ross Mathews
- No. of contestants: 14
- Winner: Aquaria
- Runners-up: Eureka; Kameron Michaels
- Miss Congeniality: Monét X Change
- Companion show: RuPaul's Drag Race: Untucked!
- No. of episodes: 14

Release
- Original network: VH1
- Original release: March 22 – June 28, 2018

Season chronology
- ← Previous; Season 9 Next → Season 11

The tenth season of RuPaul's Drag Race began airing on March 22, 2018, on VH1. The premiere was broadcast one week after the finale of the third season of RuPaul's Drag Race All Stars, and episodes were followed by RuPaul's Drag Race: Untucked. Contestants were officially announced on February 22, 2018, in a teaser trailer during an episode of All Stars 3 later followed by a special "Meet the Queens" live-stream on Facebook, hosted by season nine winner, Sasha Velour. This season saw the return of season 9 contestant Eureka O'Hara who was removed from her original season after tearing her ACL. The prizes for the winner of this season include a one-year supply of Anastasia Beverly Hills cosmetics and a cash prize of $100,000. This is the first season in which each episode was 90 minutes long.

The theme song played during the runway segment every episode was "Snapshot", and the song played during the closing credits was "Rock It (To The Moon)", both songs from the album Remember Me: Essential, Vol. 1.

Much like the previous season, it featured the top four contestants of the season advance to the finale and compete in the "Lip-Sync for the Crown".

The winner of the tenth season of RuPaul's Drag Race was Aquaria, with Kameron Michaels and Eureka being the runners-up, and Monét X Change being Miss Congeniality.

== Contestants ==
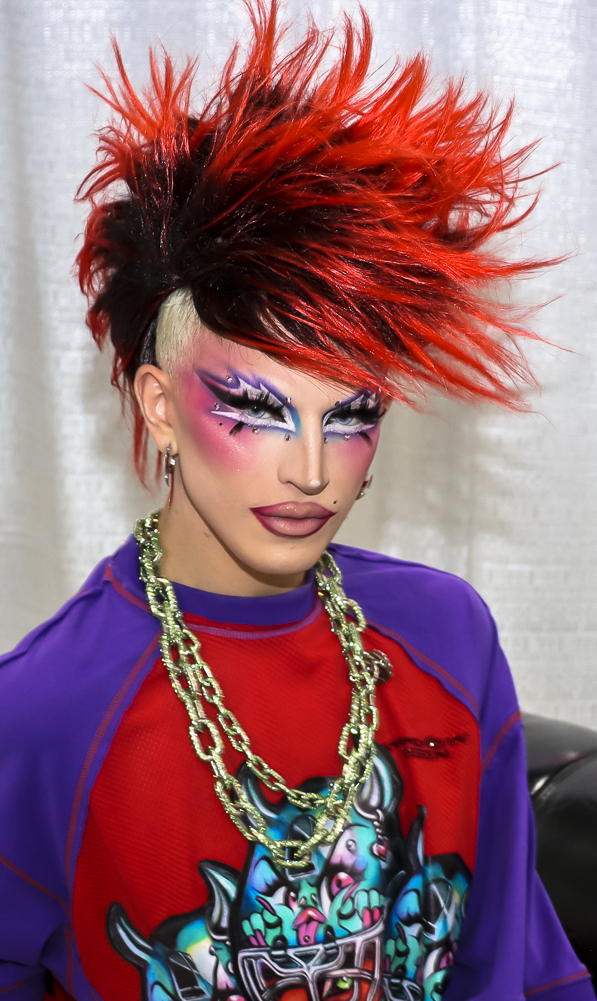
The winner, Aquaria

Ages, names, and cities stated are at time of filming.

Contestants of RuPaul's Drag Race season 10 and their backgrounds
Contestant	Age	Hometown	Outcome
Aquaria	21	New York City, New York	Winner
Eureka (Note: Eureka O'Hara is referred to as Eureka on the show. She was removed from season 9 due to injury and was invited back to compete this season.)	27	Johnson City, Tennessee	Runners-up
Kameron Michaels	31	Nashville, Tennessee	Runners-up
Asia O'Hara (Note: Asia Taylor O'Hara is referred to as Asia O'Hara on the show.)	35	Dallas, Texas	4th place
Miz Cracker	33	New York City, New York	5th place
Monét X Change	27	New York City, New York	6th place (Note: Monét X Change was voted Miss Congeniality by fellow contestants.)
The Vixen	26	Chicago, Illinois	7th place
Monique Heart (Note: Mo Heart is referred to as Monique Heart during her time on the show.)	31	Kansas City, Missouri	8th place
Blair St. Clair	22	Indianapolis, Indiana	9th place
Mayhem Miller	35	Riverside, California	10th place
Dusty Ray Bottoms	29	New York City, New York	11th place
Yuhua Hamasaki (Note: Yuhua is referred to as Yuhua Hamasaki during her time on the show.)	27	New York City, New York	12th place
Kalorie Karbdashian Williams	27	Albuquerque, New Mexico	13th place
Vanessa Vanjie Mateo (Note: Vanessa Vanjie is referred to as Vanessa Vanjie Mateo on the show.)	25	Tampa, Florida	14th place

== Contestant progress ==
Legend:

Aquaria won RuPaul's Drag Race season 10.
Eureka and Kameron Michaels were the runners-up.
Monét X Change was voted Miss Congeniality (Miss C) by fellow contestants.
WIN indicates that the contestant won the challenge.
SAFE indicates that the contestant was declared safe by the judges.
BTM (Bottom) indicates that the contestant was up for elimination.
ELIM (Eliminated) indicates that the contestant was eliminated.
Guest indicates that the contestant returned as a guest.

Progress of contestants including placements in each episode
Contestant	Episode													
Contestant	1	2	3	4	5	6	7	8	9	10	11	12	13	14
Aquaria	SAFE	SAFE	SAFE	WIN	SAFE	SAFE	WIN	SAFE	SAFE	SAFE	WIN	SAFE	Guest	Winner
Eureka	SAFE	BTM	SAFE	SAFE	WIN	WIN	SAFE	SAFE	BTM	SAFE	SAFE	SAFE	Guest	Runner-up
Kameron Michaels	SAFE	SAFE	SAFE	SAFE	SAFE	SAFE	SAFE	WIN	BTM	BTM	BTM	SAFE	Guest	Runner-up
Asia O'Hara	SAFE	SAFE	WIN	SAFE	SAFE	SAFE	SAFE	BTM	WIN	SAFE	SAFE	SAFE	Guest	Eliminated
Miz Cracker	SAFE	SAFE	SAFE	SAFE	SAFE	SAFE	SAFE	SAFE	SAFE	WIN	ELIM		Guest	Guest
Monét X Change	SAFE	SAFE	SAFE	BTM	BTM	SAFE	SAFE	SAFE	SAFE	ELIM			Guest	Miss C
The Vixen	SAFE	WIN	SAFE	SAFE	SAFE	BTM	BTM	ELIM					Guest	Guest
Monique Heart	SAFE	SAFE	SAFE	SAFE	SAFE	SAFE	ELIM						Guest	Guest
Blair St. Clair	SAFE	SAFE	SAFE	SAFE	SAFE	ELIM							Guest	Guest
Mayhem Miller	WIN	SAFE	BTM	SAFE	ELIM								Guest	Guest
Dusty Ray Bottoms	SAFE	SAFE	SAFE	ELIM									Guest	Guest
Yuhua Hamasaki	SAFE	SAFE	ELIM										Guest	Guest
Kalorie Karbdashian Williams	BTM	ELIM											Guest	Guest
Vanessa Vanjie Mateo	ELIM												Guest	Guest

== Lip syncs ==
Legend:

The contestant was eliminated after their first time in the bottom.
The contestant was eliminated after their second time in the bottom.
The contestant was eliminated after their third time in the bottom.
The contestant won the first round of the Lip Sync Smackdown for the Crown.
The contestant won the second round of the Lip Sync Smackdown for the Crown and was declared the winner of the season.

Episode	Contestants			Song	Eliminated
1	Kalorie Karbdashian Williams	vs.	Vanessa Vanjie Mateo	"Ain't No Other Man" (Christina Aguilera)	Vanessa Vanjie Mateo
2	Eureka	vs.	Kalorie Karbdashian Williams	"Best of My Love" (The Emotions)	Kalorie Karbdashian Williams
3	Mayhem Miller	vs.	Yuhua Hamasaki	"Celebrity Skin" (Hole)	Yuhua Hamasaki
4	Dusty Ray Bottoms	vs.	Monét X Change	"Pound the Alarm" (Nicki Minaj)	Dusty Ray Bottoms
5	Mayhem Miller	vs.	Monét X Change	"Man! I Feel Like a Woman!" (Shania Twain)	Mayhem Miller
6	Blair St. Clair	vs.	The Vixen	"I'm Coming Out" (Diana Ross)	Blair St. Clair
7	Monique Heart	vs.	The Vixen	"Cut to the Feeling" (Carly Rae Jepsen)	Monique Heart
8	Asia O'Hara	vs.	The Vixen	"Groove Is in the Heart" (Deee-Lite)	The Vixen
9	Eureka	vs.	Kameron Michaels	"New Attitude" (Patti LaBelle)	None
10	Kameron Michaels	vs.	Monét X Change	"Good as Hell" (Lizzo)	Monét X Change
11	Kameron Michaels	vs.	Miz Cracker	"Nasty Girl" (Vanity 6)	Miz Cracker
12	Aquaria vs. Asia O'Hara vs. Eureka vs. Kameron Michaels			"Call Me Mother" (RuPaul)	None
Episode	Contestants			Song	Winner(s)
14	Asia O'Hara	vs.	Kameron Michaels	"Nasty" (Janet Jackson)	Kameron Michaels
14	Aquaria	vs.	Eureka	"If" (Janet Jackson)	Aquaria
14	Aquaria	vs.	Eureka	"If" (Janet Jackson)	Eureka
14	Aquaria vs. Eureka vs. Kameron Michaels			"Bang Bang" (Jessie J, Ariana Grande, Nicki Minaj)	Aquaria

== Guest judges ==
Listed in chronological order:

- Christina Aguilera, singer, songwriter, actress
- Halsey, singer, author, actress
- Padma Lakshmi, actress, model
- Courtney Love, singer, songwriter, actress
- Nico Tortorella, actor, model
- Logan Browning, actress
- Tisha Campbell, actress, singer
- Carrie Preston, actress, producer, singer
- Shania Twain, singer, songwriter
- Emily V. Gordon, writer, producer
- Kumail Nanjiani, comedian, actor, writer
- Audra McDonald, actress, singer
- Kate Upton, model, actress
- Andrew Rannells, actor, singer
- Billy Eichner, comedian, actor, writer
- Abbi Jacobson, comedian, writer, actress
- Ilana Glazer, comedian, writer, actress
- Miles Heizer, actor, musician
- Lizzo, rapper, singer
- Lena Dunham, actress, writer, director
- Ashanti, singer, songwriter, actress
- Todrick Hall, singer, director, choreographer

=== Special guests ===
Guests who appeared in episodes, but did not judge on the main stage.

Episode 1

- Adore Delano, contestant on season 6 and All Stars season 2
- Bob the Drag Queen, winner of season 8
- Chad Michaels, runner-up of season 4 and winner of All Stars season 1
- Darienne Lake, contestant on season 6
- Delta Work, contestant on season 3
- Derrick Barry, contestant on season 8
- Detox, contestant on season 5 and All Stars season 2
- Jaymes Mansfield, contestant on season 9
- Jessica Wild, contestant on season 2
- Jiggly Caliente, contestant on season 4
- Jinkx Monsoon, winner of season 5
- Jujubee, contestant on season 2 and All Stars season 1
- Katya, "Miss Congeniality" on season 7 and contestant on All Stars season 2
- Kim Chi, contestant on season 8
- Laganja Estranja, contestant on season 6
- Manila Luzon, contestant on season 3 and All Stars season 1
- Mariah Balenciaga, contestant on season 3
- Morgan McMichaels, contestant on season 2 and All Stars season 3
- Mrs. Kasha Davis, contestant on season 7
- Ongina, contestant on season 1
- Pandora Boxx, "Miss Congeniality" on season 2 and contestant on All Stars season 1
- Peppermint, contestant on season 9
- Raven, contestant on season 2 and All Stars season 1
- Tempest DuJour, contestant on season 7
- Trixie Mattel, contestant on season 7 and winner of All Stars season 3
- Victoria "Porkchop" Parker, contestant on season 1
- Yara Sofia, "Miss Congeniality" on season 3 and contestant on All Stars season 1

Episode 2

- Andy Cohen, television personality
- Alyssa Edwards, contestant on season 5 and All Stars season 2

Episode 4

- Shawn Morales, Pit Crew member from seasons 3 to 6

Episode 5

- Ross Mathews, television personality

Episode 7

- Bianca Del Rio, winner of season 6
- Alex Trebek, game show host

Episode 8

- Chad Michaels, runner-up of season 4 and winner of All Stars season 1
- Todrick Hall, singer, director, and choreographer
- Andrew Rannells, American film, stage, television, and voice actor

Episode 9

- Stephen Colbert, television host
- Randy Rainbow, comedian

Episode 10

- Anthony Padilla, actor, comedian, and YouTube personality
- Chester See, singer, actor, and YouTube personality
- Frankie Grande, dancer, actor, singer, and YouTube personality
- Kingsley, comedian, blogger, and YouTube personality
- Raymond Braun, actor, and YouTube personality
- Tyler Oakley, author, and YouTube personality

Episode 11

- Cheyenne Jackson, actor, singer

Episode 14

- Akashia, contestant on season 1
- BeBe Zahara Benet, winner of season 1 and contestant on All Stars season 3
- Jade, contestant on season 1
- Nina Flowers, runner-up and Miss Congeniality of season 1 and contestant on All Stars season 1
- Ongina, contestant on season 1
- Rebecca Glasscock, contestant on season 1
- Shannel, contestant on season 1 and All Stars season 1
- Victoria "Porkchop" Parker, contestant on season 1
- Oprah Winfrey, television personality
- Gus Kenworthy, Olympic freestyle skier
- Judi Dench, actress
- Sally Jessy Raphael, talk show host
- Valentina, "Miss Congeniality" of season 9
- Sasha Velour, winner of season 9

== Episodes ==
No. overall	No. in season	Title	Original release date
118	1	"10s Across the Board"	March 22, 2018
Thirteen new queens enter the workroom. Eureka, who was removed last season due to a knee injury, made a comeback to compete again. For the first mini-challenge, the queens have to stand out on the runway among a sea of legendary queens from past seasons. Monét X Change wins the mini-challenge. For the main challenge, the queens create an outfit made from items found at a 99 cent store. On the runway, Blair St. Clair, Mayhem Miller, Miz Cracker and Yuhua Hamasaki receive positive critiques, with Mayhem Miller winning the challenge. Dusty Ray Bottoms, Kalorie Karbdashian Williams and Vanessa Vanjie Mateo receive negative critiques, with Dusty Ray Bottoms being safe. Kalorie Karbdashian Williams and Vanessa Vanjie Mateo lip-sync to "Ain't No Other Man" by Christina Aguilera. Kalorie Karbdashian Williams wins the lip-sync and Vanessa Vanjie Mateo sashays away.: Guest Judge: Christina Aguilera; Alternating Judges: Carson Kressley and Ross Mathews; Mini-Challenge: Stand out on the runway among a sea of legendary queens from past seasons; Mini-Challenge Winner: Monét X Change; Mini-Challenge Prize: A $2,000 gift card to FierceQueen.com; Main Challenge: Create an outfit made from items found at a 99 cent store; Challenge Winner: Mayhem Miller; Challenge Prize: A luxury Hawaiian getaway to Hale Mohalu Guesthouse and Retreat; Bottom Two: Kalorie Karbdashian Williams and Vanessa Vanjie Mateo; Lip-Sync Song: "Ain't No Other Man" by Christina Aguilera; Eliminated: Vanessa Vanjie Mateo; Farewell Message: "Ladies I ❤️ U The Vanjie way! xoxo Vanessa ❤️!"
119	2	"PharmaRusical"	March 29, 2018
For this week's mini-challenge, the queens participate in the "Hay Girl Hay" hoedown. Asia O'Hara and The Vixen win the mini-challenge. For the main challenge, the queens perform in PharmaRusical.: Team Asia O'Hara: Aquaria, Asia O'Hara, Dusty Ray Bottoms, Eureka, Kalorie Karbdashian Williams, Monique Heart and Yuhua Hamasaki; Team The Vixen: Blair St. Clair, Kameron Michaels, Mayhem Miller, Miz Cracker and Monét X Change; On the runway, category is Very Best Drag. Team The Vixen is the winning team, with The Vixen winning the challenge. Team Asia O'Hara is the losing team. Eureka, Kalorie Karbdashian Williams and Monique Heart receive negative critiques, with Monique Heart being safe. Eureka and Kalorie Karbdashian Williams lip-sync to "Best of My Love" by The Emotions. Eureka wins the lip-sync and Kalorie Karbdashian Williams sashays away.: Guest Judges: Halsey and Padma Lakshmi; Alternating Judge: Ross Mathews; Mini-Challenge: Participate in the "Hay Girl Hay" hoedown; Mini-Challenge Winners: Asia O'Hara and The Vixen; Main Challenge: PharmaRusical; Runway Theme: Very Best Drag; Challenge Winner: The Vixen; Challenge Prize: Jewelry from Fierce Drag Jewels and a $2,000 gift card to Nailed by Cristy; Bottom Two: Eureka and Kalorie Karbdashian Williams; Lip-Sync Song: "Best of My Love" by The Emotions; Eliminated: Kalorie Karbdashian Williams; Farewell Message: "Thank you Sisters. I'm So Blessed to have met you all. Keep it Kute! KKW"
120	3	"Tap That App"	April 5, 2018
For this week's mini-challenge, the queens perform in screen tests for Ru's provocative new RuPaul's Chocolate Bar campaign. Blair St. Clair, Monét X Change and Monique Heart win the mini-challenge. For the main challenge, the queens team up and film ads for new dating apps.: End of Days - Blair St. Clair, Eureka, Miz Cracker and The Vixen; Fibstr - Dusty Ray Bottoms, Kameron Michaels, Mayhem Miller and Monique Heart; Madam ButtrFace - Aquaria, Asia O'Hara, Monét X Change and Yuhua Hamasaki; On the runway, category is Feathers. Asia O'Hara, Blair St. Clair and Eureka receive positive critiques, with Asia O'Hara winning the challenge. Kameron Michaels, Mayhem Miller and Yuhua Hamasaki receive negative critiques, with Kameron Michaels being safe. Mayhem Miller and Yuhua Hamasaki lip-sync to . Mayhem Miller wins the lip-sync and Yuhua Hamasaki sashays away.: Guest Judges: Courtney Love and Nico Tortorella; Alternating Judge: Carson Kressley; Mini-Challenge: Perform in screen tests for Ru's provocative new RuPaul's Chocolate Bar campaign; Mini-Challenge Winners: Blair St. Clair, Monét X Change, and Monique Heart; Main Challenge: In teams, film ads for new dating apps; Runway Theme: Feathers; Challenge Winner: Asia O'Hara; Challenge Prize: A $2,000 gift card to Casper Sleep and a $3,000 gift card to Catherine D'Lish; Bottom Two: Mayhem Miller and Yuhua Hamasaki; Lip-Sync Song: "Celebrity Skin" by Hole; Eliminated: Yuhua Hamasaki; Farewell Message: "我爱 you (I love you all! Season 10 is going to be amazing! - Yuhua Hamasaki)"
121	4	"The Last Ball on Earth"	April 12, 2018
For this week's mini-challenge, the queens photobomb iconic celebrity pictures. Aquaria wins the mini-challenge. For the main challenge, the queens create three looks for The Last Ball on Earth: Alaskan Winter Realness, Miami Summer Realness and Martian Eleganza Extravaganza. On the runway, Aquaria, Kameron Michaels and Miz Cracker receive positive critiques, with Aquaria winning the challenge. Asia O'Hara, Dusty Ray Bottoms and Monét X Change receive negative critiques, with Asia O'Hara being safe. Dusty Ray Bottoms and Monét X Change lip-sync to "Pound the Alarm" by Nicki Minaj. Monét X Change wins the lip-sync and Dusty Ray Bottoms sashays away.: Guest Judges: Logan Browning and Tisha Campbell; Alternating Judge: Ross Mathews; Mini-Challenge: Photobomb iconic celebrity pictures; Mini-Challenge Winner: Aquaria; Mini-Challenge Prize: A $1,000 credit to Postmates; Main Challenge: The Last Ball on Earth; Runway Themes: Alaskan Winter Realness, Miami Summer Realness and Martian Eleganza Extravaganza; Challenge Winner: Aquaria; Challenge Prize: A $2,000 gift card to D Bleu Dazzled and wigs courtesy of RockStar Wigs; Bottom Two: Dusty Ray Bottoms and Monét X Change; Lip-Sync Song: "Pound the Alarm" by Nicki Minaj; Eliminated: Dusty Ray Bottoms; Farewell Message: "NEVA LAVD YA! ❤️ Dusty"
122	5	"The Bossy Rossy Show"	April 19, 2018
For this week's mini-challenge, the queens create a military inspired outfit to enlist in the Drag Army. The Vixen wins the mini-challenge. For the main challenge, the queens pair up and improvise in the new day-time talk show "Bossy Rossy".: I Married A Cactus! - Blair St. Clair and Monique Heart; My Freaky Addiction is Ruining My Life! - Kameron Michaels and Monét X Change; Save Me From My Deadly Fear of... Pickles! - Mayhem Miller and Miz Cracker; Why Are You So Obsessed with Me? - Asia O'Hara and The Vixen; Look At Me! I'm a Sexy Baby! - Aquaria and Eureka; On the runway, category is Denim and Diamonds. Eureka, Monique Heart and Miz Cracker receive positive critiques, with Eureka winning the challenge. Mayhem Miller, Monét X Change and The Vixen receive negative critiques, with The Vixen being safe. Mayhem Miller and Monét X Change lip-sync to "Man! I Feel Like A Woman!" by Shania Twain. Monét X Change wins the lip-sync and Mayhem Miller sashays away.: Guest Judges: Carrie Preston and Shania Twain; Alternating Judge: Carson Kressley; Mini-Challenge: Create a military inspired outfit to enlist in the Drag Army; Mini-Challenge Winner: The Vixen; Main Challenge: In pairs, improvise in the new day-time talk show "Bossy Rossy"; Runway Theme: Denim and Diamonds; Challenge Winner: Eureka; Challenge Prize: 2 VIP tickets to Cirque du Soleil: Zumanity in Las Vegas, including flights and accommodation; Bottom Two: Mayhem Miller and Monét X Change; Lip-Sync Song: "Man! I Feel Like a Woman!" by Shania Twain; Eliminated: Mayhem Miller; Farewell Message: "I ❤️ to PARTY xoxo May"
123	6	"Drag Con Panel Extravaganza"	April 26, 2018
For this week's mini-challenge, the queens have to identify objects by only sitting on them. Asia O'Hara wins the mini-challenge. For the main challenge, the queens team up to create and produce RuPaul's DragCon panels in front of a live audience.: Body - Eureka, Kameron Michaels and Monét X Change; Face - Aquaria, Asia O'Hara and Monique Heart; Hair - Blair St. Clair, Miz Cracker and The Vixen; On the runway, category is Hats Incredible. Eureka, Kameron Michaels and Monét X Change receive positive critiques, with Eureka winning the challenge. Blair St. Clair, Miz Cracker and The Vixen receive negative critiques, with Miz Cracker being safe. Blair St. Clair and The Vixen lip-sync to "I'm Coming Out" by Diana Ross. The Vixen wins the lip-sync and Blair St. Clair sashays away.: Guest Judges: Kumail Nanjiani and Emily V. Gordon; Alternating Judge: Ross Mathews; Mini-Challenge: Identify objects by only sitting on them; Mini-Challenge Winner: Asia O'Hara; Mini-Challenge Prize: A $2,000 hair care package from Art Lab Salon; Main Challenge: In teams, create and produce RuPaul's DragCon panels in front of a live audience; Runway Theme: Hats Incredible; Challenge Winner: Eureka; Challenge Prize: A Four-night stay and spa treatments for 2 at Saguaro in Palm Springs; Bottom Two: Blair St. Clair and The Vixen; Lip-Sync Song: "I'm Coming Out" by Diana Ross; Eliminated: Blair St. Clair; Farewell Message: "Let me be your STAR! xoxo Blair St. Clair"
124	7	"Snatch Game"	May 3, 2018
For this week's mini-challenge, the queens read each other to filth. Eureka wins the mini-challenge. For the main challenge, the queens play the Snatch Game. Audra McDonald and Kate Upton star as the celebrity contestants. The cast consisted of: Aquaria as Melania Trump; Asia O'Hara as Beyoncé; Eureka as Alana "Honey Boo Boo" Thompson; Kameron Michaels as Chyna; Miz Cracker as Dorothy Parker; Monét X Change as Maya Angelou; Monique Heart as Maxine Waters; The Vixen as Blue Ivy Carter; On the runway, category is Mermaid Fantasy. Aquaria, Eureka and Monét X Change receive positive critiques, with Aquaria winning the challenge. Asia O'Hara, Monique Heart and The Vixen receive negative critiques, with Asia O'Hara being safe. Monique Heart and The Vixen lip-sync to "Cut to the Feeling" by Carly Rae Jepsen. The Vixen wins the lip-sync and Monique Heart sashays away.: Guest Judges: Audra McDonald and Kate Upton; Alternating Judge: Carson Kressley; Mini-Challenge: Reading is Fundamental; Mini-Challenge Winner: Eureka; Mini-Challenge Prize: A $2,000 gift card to l.a.Eyeworks; Main Challenge: Snatch Game; Runway Theme: Mermaid Fantasy; Challenge Winner: Aquaria; Challenge Prize: A 6-night stay at Grove Hotel on Fire Island; Bottom Two: Monique Heart and The Vixen; Lip-Sync Song: "Cut to the Feeling" by Carly Rae Jepsen; Eliminated: Monique Heart; Farewell Message: "Always abide in love & learn your words! Facts are facts"
125	8	"The Unauthorized Rusical"	May 10, 2018
For this week's mini-challenge, the queens attempt to make RuPaul slap them. Asia O'Hara wins the mini-challenge. For the main challenge, the queens perform in Cher: The Unauthorized Rusical.: Aquaria plays Disco Cher; Asia O'Hara plays Movie Star Cher; Eureka plays Rockstar Cher; Kameron Michaels plays 60s Cher; Miz Cracker plays Comeback Cher; Monét X Change and The Vixen both play 70s Variety Show Cher; On the runway, category is Glitterific. Kameron Michaels and Monét X Change receive positive critiques, with Kameron Michaels winning the challenge. Aquaria, Asia O'Hara and The Vixen receive negative critiques, with Aquaria being safe. Asia O'Hara and The Vixen lip-sync to "Groove Is In the Heart" by Deee-Lite. Asia O'Hara wins the lip-sync and The Vixen sashays away.: Guest Judges: Billy Eichner and Andrew Rannells; Alternating Judge: Carson Kressley; Mini-Challenge: Attempt to make RuPaul slap them; Mini-Challenge Winner: Asia O'Hara; Mini-Challenge Prize: A $2,000 gift card to Sparkles Rhinestones; Main Challenge: Cher: The Unauthorized Rusical; Runway Theme: Glitterific; Challenge Winner: Kameron Michaels; Challenge Prize: A luxury VIP getaway to Sofitel Hotel in Los Angeles; Bottom Two: Asia O'Hara and The Vixen; Lip-Sync Song: "Groove Is In the Heart" by Deee-Lite; Eliminated: The Vixen; Farewell Message: "EVIL Triumps when good queens do nothing! Buy My Album The Vixen"
126	9	"Breastworld"	May 17, 2018
For this week's mini-challenge, the queens have to find matching pairs of the pit crew's underwear. Aquaria wins the mini-challenge. For the main challenge, the queens act in the new hit series "Breastworld".: Aquaria plays Dyslexa; Asia O'Hara plays Para Salin; Eureka plays Rosi; Kameron Michaels plays Muffy; Miz Cracker plays Julie; Monét X Change plays Viv; On the runway, category is Silver Foxy. Aquaria, Asia O'Hara and Monét X Change receive positive critiques, with Asia O'Hara winning the challenge. Eureka, Kameron Michaels and Miz Cracker receive negative critiques, with Miz Cracker being safe. Eureka and Kameron Michaels lip-sync to "New Attitude" by Patti LaBelle. They are both declared the winners of the lip-sync and no one goes home.: Guest Judges: Abbi Jacobson and Ilana Glazer; Alternating Judge: Ross Mathews; Mini-Challenge: Find matching pairs of pit crew's underwear; Mini-Challenge Winner: Aquaria; Main Challenge: Act in the new hit series "Breastworld"; Runway Theme: Silver Foxy; Challenge Winner: Asia O'Hara; Challenge Prize: A 4-night stay at Frog Meadow Farm in Vermont; Bottom Two: Eureka and Kameron Michaels; Lip-Sync Song: "New Attitude" by Patti LaBelle; Eliminated: None
127	10	"Social Media Kings Into Queens"	May 24, 2018
For this week's mini-challenge, the queens participate in a manly photoshoot advertising a new body spray called "Trade". Eureka wins the mini-challenge. For the main challenge, the queens makeover social media superstars. On the runway, category is Drag Family Values. Asia O'Hara, Eureka and Miz Cracker receive positive critiques, with Miz Cracker winning the challenge. Aquaria, Kameron Michaels and Monét X Change receive negative critiques, with Aquaria being safe. Kameron Michaels and Monét X Change lip-sync to "Good as Hell" by Lizzo. Kameron Michaels wins the lip-sync and Monét X Change sashays away.: Guest Judges: Miles Heizer and Lizzo; Alternating Judge: Ross Mathews; Mini-Challenge: Participate in a manly photoshoot advertising a new body spray called "Trade"; Mini-Challenge Winner: Eureka; Mini-Challenge Prize: A $2,000 gift card to MuLondon; Main Challenge: Makeover social media superstars; Runway Theme: Drag Family Values; Challenge Winner: Miz Cracker; Challenge Prize: A $2,000 gift card to Jane Doe Latex for the queen and a $2,000 gift card to Klein, Epstein, and Parker for their partner; Bottom Two: Kameron Michaels and Monét X Change; Lip-Sync Song: "Good as Hell" by Lizzo; Eliminated: Monét X Change; Farewell Message: "Long Live the Sponge!!! MXC"
128	11	"Evil Twins"	June 7, 2018
For this week's mini-challenge, the queens decorate a pancake in edible drag. Asia O'Hara wins the mini-challenge. For the main challenge, the queens present two characters on the runway: Best Self and Evil Twin. On the runway, Aquaria, Asia O'Hara and Eureka receive positive critiques, with Aquaria winning the challenge. Kameron Michaels and Miz Cracker receive negative critiques, and are announced as the bottom two. They lip-sync to "Nasty Girl" by Vanity 6. Kameron Michaels wins the lip-sync and Miz Cracker sashays away.: Guest Judges: Lena Dunham and Ashanti; Alternating Judge: Carson Kressley; Mini-Challenge: Decorate a pancake in edible drag; Mini-Challenge Winner: Asia O'Hara; Mini-Challenge Prize: A $2,000 gift card to The Spa on Rodeo; Main Challenge: Present two characters on the runway; Runway Themes: Best Self and Evil Twin; Challenge Winner: Aquaria; Challenge Prize: A trip for 2 to The Grand Resort and Spa in Fort Lauderdale and two luggage sets from Radden Luggage; Bottom two: Kameron Michaels and Miz Cracker; Lip-Sync Song: "Nasty Girl" by Vanity 6; Eliminated: Miz Cracker; Farewell Message: "KNOW YOURSELF M"
129	12	"American"	June 14, 2018
For the final challenge of the season, the queens write, record and perform their own verses to RuPaul's song "American". On the runway, category is Final Four Eleganza Extravaganza. The remaining queens then lip-sync to "Call Me Mother" by RuPaul. After the lip-sync, Aquaria, Asia O'Hara, Eureka and Kameron Michaels are announced as the finalists.: Guest Judge: Todrick Hall; Alternating Judges: Carson Kressley and Ross Mathews; Main Challenge: Write, record, and perform their own verses to RuPaul's song "American"; Runway Theme: Final Four Eleganza Extravaganza; Lip-Sync Song: "Call Me Mother" by RuPaul; Eliminated: None
130	13	"Queens Reunited"	June 21, 2018
The queens all return for the reunion. Discussions include: Vanessa Vanjie Mateo becoming a viral sensation, epic lip-sync moments of the season, The Vixen's confrontational moments, and the eliminated queens all pick who they think deserves the crown.
131	14	"Grand Finale"	June 28, 2018
All the queens return for the live grand finale. Monét X Change is announced as this season's Miss Congeniality. RuPaul then announces that the final four queens will take part in a lip-sync smackdown for the crown. The first lip-sync is between Asia O'Hara and Kameron Michaels. They lip-sync to "Nasty" by Janet Jackson. Kameron Michaels wins the lip-sync and Asia O'Hara is eliminated. The second lip-sync is between Aquaria and Eureka. They lip-sync to "If" by Janet Jackson. They both win the lip-sync and move on to the final round. The final lip-sync is between Aquaria, Eureka and Kameron Michaels. They lip-sync to "Bang Bang" by Ariana Grande, Jessie J, and Nicki Minaj. It is announced that Aquaria is the winner, leaving Eureka and Kameron Michaels as the runners-up.: Finals venue: Ace Theater, Los Angeles, California; Final Four: Aquaria, Asia O'Hara, Eureka and Kameron Michaels; Miss Congeniality: Monét X Change; Lip-Sync Smackdown #1: Asia O'Hara vs. Kameron Michaels; Lip-Sync Song: "Nasty" by Janet Jackson; Eliminated: Asia O'Hara; Lip-Sync Smackdown #2: Aquaria vs. Eureka; Lip-Sync Song: "If" by Janet Jackson; Eliminated: None; Lip-Sync Smackdown #3: Aquaria vs. Eureka vs. Kameron Michaels; Lip-Sync Song: "Bang Bang" by Ariana Grande, Jessie J, and Nicki Minaj; Runners-up: Eureka and Kameron Michaels; Winner of RuPaul's Drag Race Season 10: Aquaria

== Ratings ==
Viewership and ratings per episode of RuPaul's Drag Race season 10
No.	Title	Air date	Rating (18–49)	Viewers (millions)
1	"10's Across the Board"	March 22, 2018	0.39	0.785
2	"PharmaRusical"	March 29, 2018	0.29	0.581
3	"Tap That App"	April 5, 2018	0.42	0.766
4	"The Last Ball on Earth"	April 12, 2018	0.36	0.694
5	"The Bossy Rossy Show"	April 19, 2018	0.39	0.692
6	"Drag Con Panel Extravaganza"	April 26, 2018	0.41	0.771
7	"Snatch Game"	May 3, 2018	0.45	0.840
8	"The Unauthorized Rusical"	May 10, 2018	0.37	0.723
9	"Breastworld"	May 17, 2018	0.33	0.698
10	"Social Media Kings Into Queens"	May 24, 2018	0.35	0.715
11	"Evil Twins"	June 7, 2018	0.31	0.631
12	"American"	June 14, 2018	0.35	0.761
13	"Queens Reunited"	June 21, 2018	0.27	0.632
14	"Grand Finale"	June 28, 2018	0.41	0.838
