= Queens Reunited =

- RuPaul's Drag Race episode
- Episode no.: Season 10; Episode 13
- Presented by: RuPaul
- Production code: 1013
- Original air date: June 21, 2018
- Running time: 60 minutes

Episode chronology
- RuPaul's Drag Race season 10

"Queens Reunited" is the thirteenth episode of the tenth season of the American television series RuPaul's Drag Race. It originally aired on June 21, 2018. The episode sees the season's contestants reunite to discuss various topics, moderated by RuPaul. It is most known for The Vixen's departure from the stage during a discussion about her confrontations.

== Episode ==
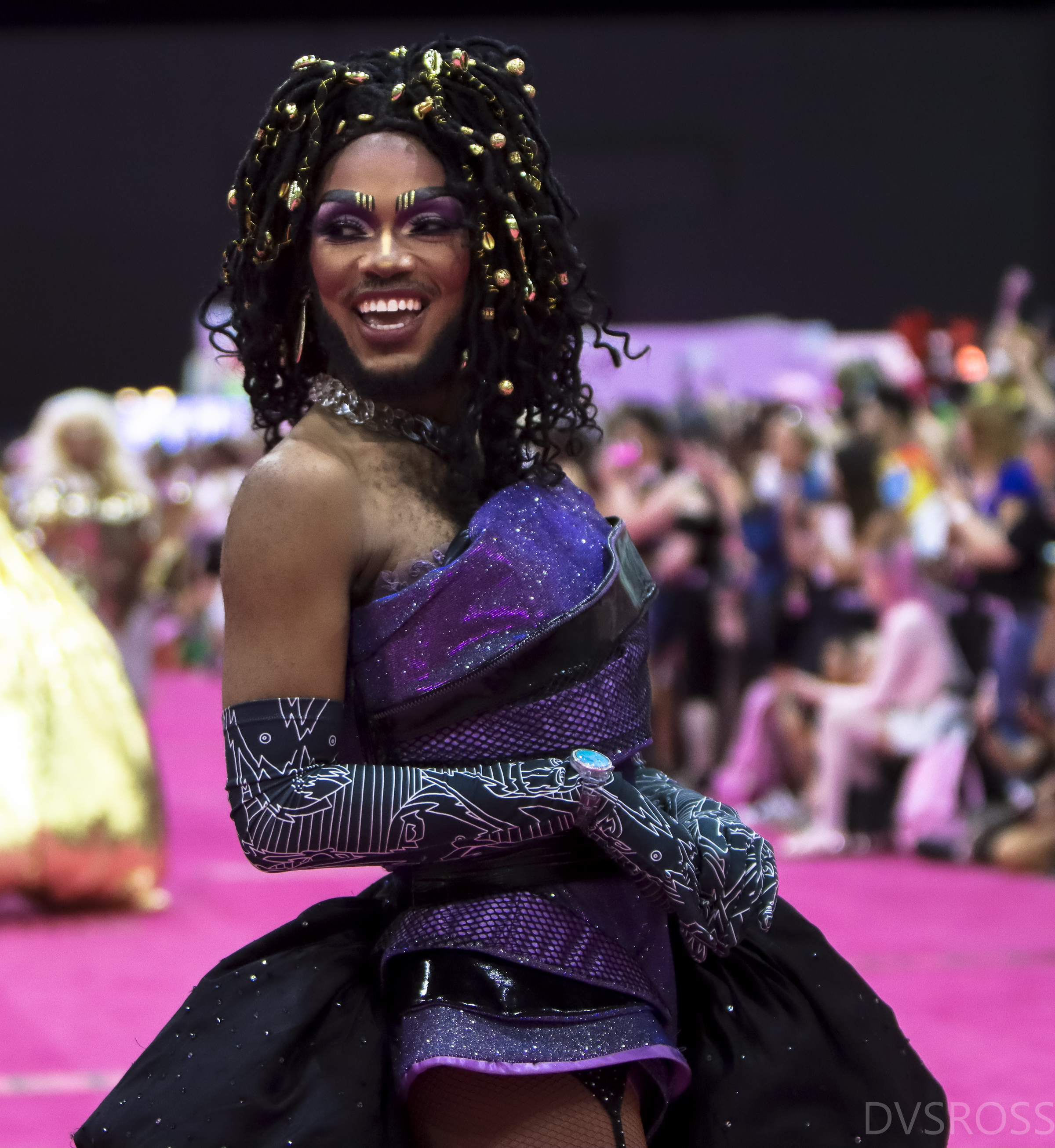
During the episode, The Vixen (pictured at RuPaul's DragCon LA in 2022) leaves the stage.

RuPaul and the season's contestants reunite on the stage of Ace Theatre in Los Angeles. A montage of Vanessa Vanjie Mateo's "Miss Vanjie" exit is shown. Vanessa Vanjie Mateo talks about the impact of going viral. The group discuss some of the season's memorable lip-sync performances. A montage is shown of The Vixen's confrontations with fellow contestants. The discussion prompts her to leave the stage. Asia O'Hara gets emotional about The Vixen's exit, then RuPaul gives some impassioned advice.

After a video clip of Dusty Ray Bottoms discussing her experience with conversion therapy is shown, she talks about her relationship with her family. Monique Heart also gets emotional talking about faith and family. After a video clip is shown of Blair St. Clair discussing her sexual assault experience on the show, she talks about her progress since the show aired. Monét X Change discusses her Caribbean upbringing and relationship with her family. Yuhua Hamasaki talks about hiding her interest in drag with her family. The group "toot" (good) or "boot" (bad) some of the looks presented by contestants over the season. A montage of unseen footage of guest judges is shown. Miz Cracker shares that some of Asia O'Hara's comment on the show hurt her feelings; Asia O'Hara apologizes. Mayhem Miller shares that she was disappointed by comments made by Aquaria and Asia O'Hara on one of the previous episodes. Monique Heart asks Kameron Michaels about her personality and social media use. RuPaul says "the library is open" and invites contestants to deliver "reads" (or playful insults) to fellow competitors. The eliminated contestants say who they think deserves the crown.

== Production and broadcast ==
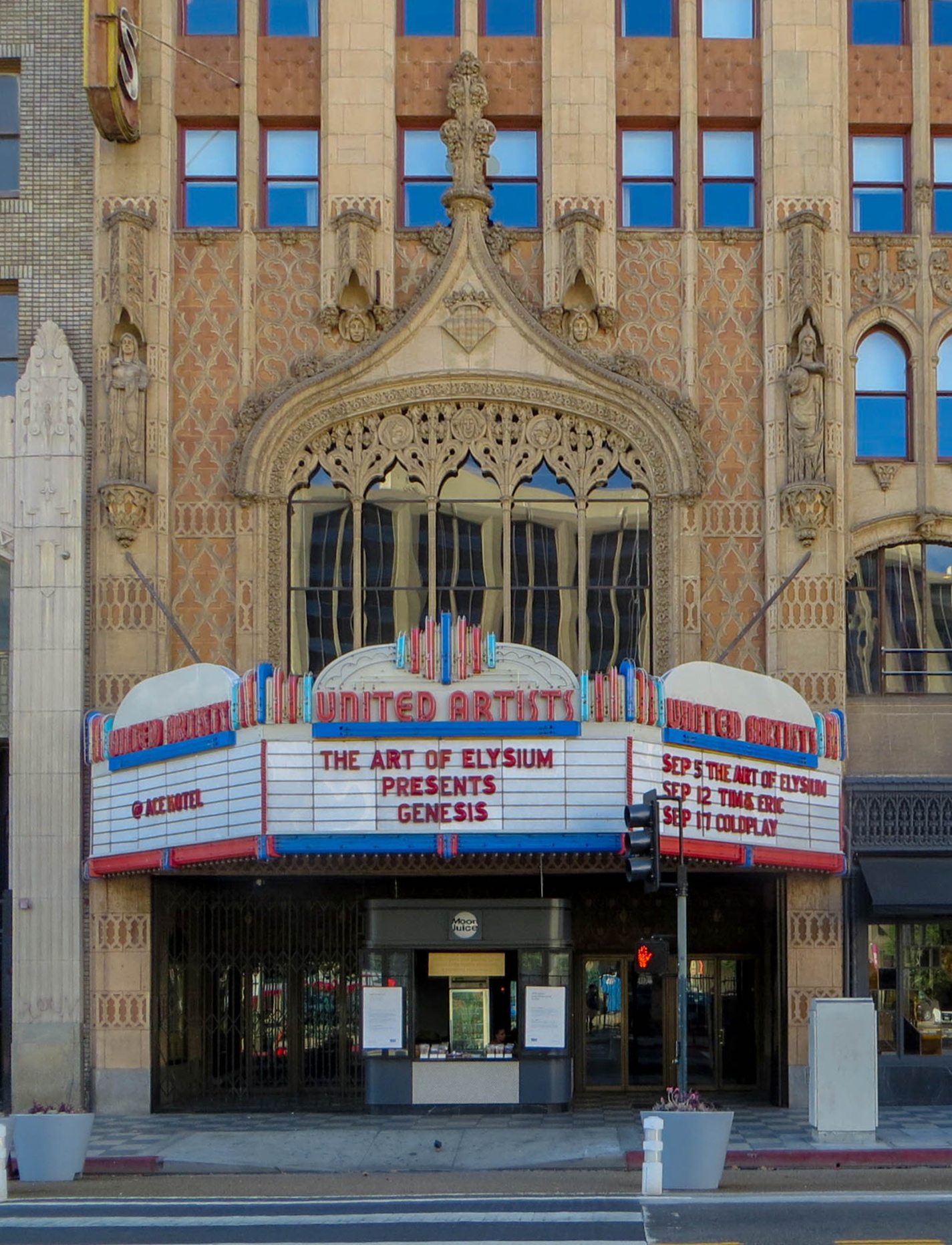
The episode was filmed at the Ace Theatre (exterior pictured in 2014) in Los Angeles.

The episode originally aired on June 21, 2018.

The Vixen aired a one-hour stream on Instagram Live to discuss the episode after airing. She has said that many of her fellow contestants reached out to her after the episode aired. The Vixen also discussed her exit in an interview with Jonny McGovern for Hey Qween!

== Reception ==
The A.V. Club gave the episode a rating of A−. Writing for Vulture, Matt Rogers and Bowen Yang rated the episode four out of five stars. John Paul Brammer of Them wrote, "When Asia challenged Ru for allowing it to happen, and when Ru lost his cool over it, that moment revealed the degree to which the show has up to now refused to squarely tackle racial dynamics both among the queens and in the show’s fandom, and how urgently it needs to do so." Brammer also wrote about Asia O'Hara: "Her popularity surged after the reunion, in which she stood up for The Vixen, who walked off the set following a relitigation of her conflict with Eureka O'Hara. The ensuing conversation with RuPaul, in which Asia tearfully advocated for compassion, left some calling to make the show Asia O'Hara's Drag Race."

Sam Damshenas of Gay Times said the reunion was the show's most dramatic to date. Reiss Smith of PinkNews said, "The Vixen won a special place in the hearts of fans after walking off the season 10 reunion in protest at what she has often described as racial bias. As a Black queen, The Vixen was painted as a confrontational force in the Drag Race werk room, particularly when she rubbed up against Eureka." Sandra Song of Nylon said the episode "drew criticism for the way it illuminated the show's oftentimes questionable handling of race". Junkee called the episode "tense" and The Vixen's exit "iconic".
