= Dusty Ray Bottoms =

American drag performer

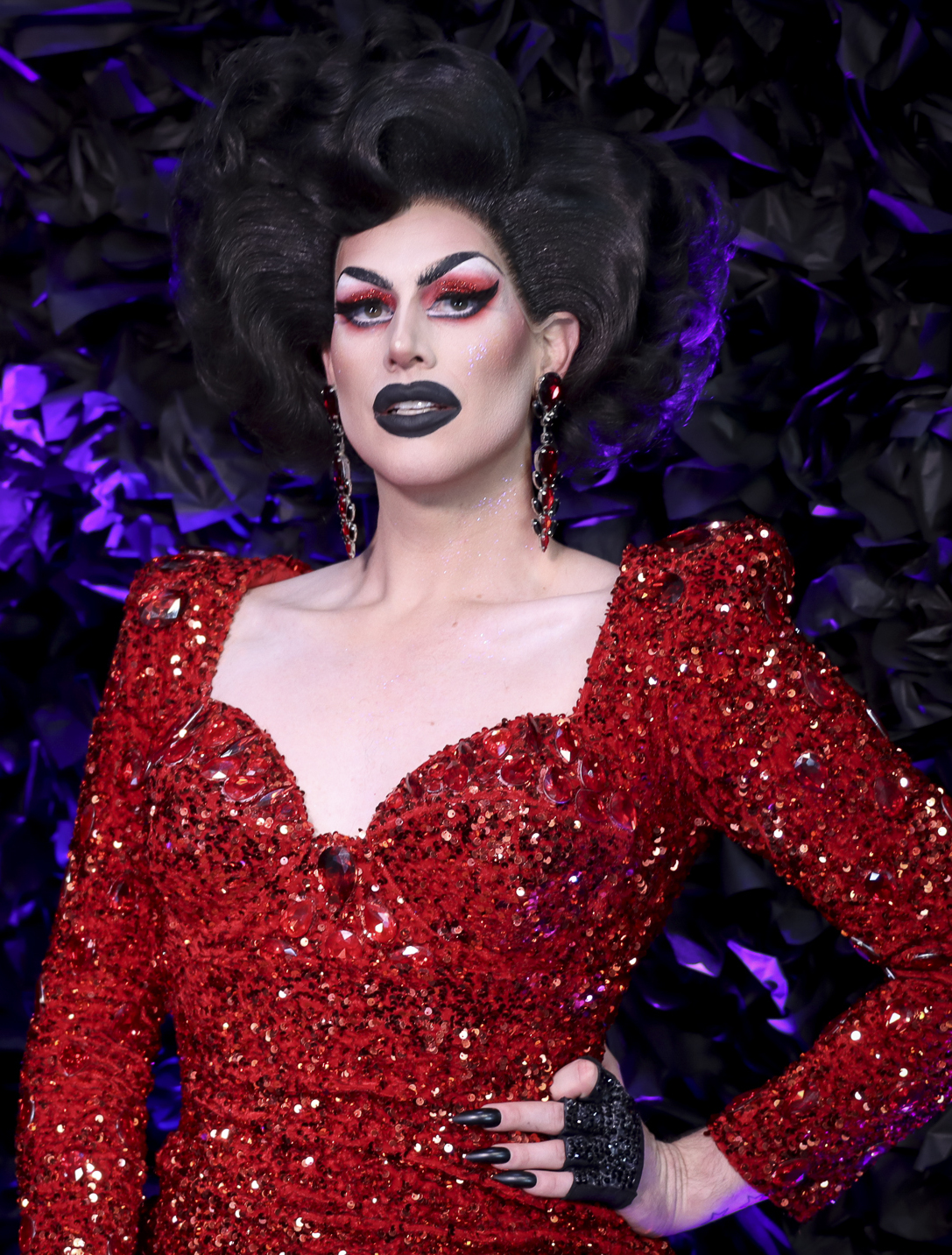
- Dusty Ray Bottoms at RuPaul's DragCon LA in 2022
- Born: Dustin Rayburn; September 29, 1987 (age 39); Louisville, Kentucky, U.S.
- Television: RuPaul's Drag Race (season 10)

Dusty Ray Bottoms is the stage name of Dustin Rayburn (born September 29, 1987), a drag performer most known for competing on season 10 of RuPaul's Drag Race. In 2022, Rayburn was featured in Conversion, a new documentary film produced by Chronicle Cinema. Rayburn was featured in Rolling Stone magazine for Pride Month in 2023.

== Early life ==
Rayburn was born in Louisville, Kentucky and raised in Floyds Knobs, Indiana in a conservative Christian family. He came out as gay at the age of 20; in response, he was sent to conversion therapy. He moved to New York City at age 22.

== Career ==
Dusty Ray Bottoms competed on season 10 of RuPaul's Drag Race. She discussed her experience of coming out and going to conversion therapy on the show. She was eliminated from the competition after placing in the bottom two of the "Last Ball on Earth" challenge and losing a lip sync against Monét X Change to "Pound the Alarm" (2012) by Nicki Minaj. In 2018, Dusty Ray Bottoms released the punk-pop single "Neva Lavd Yah", which also received a music video.

== Discography ==
=== Singles ===
- "Neva Lavd Yah" (2018)

== Filmography ==
=== Television ===
- RuPaul's Drag Race (season 10)

== See also ==
- LGBT culture in New York City
- List of LGBT people from New York City
