= Derrick Barry =

American drag performer and Britney Spears impersonator

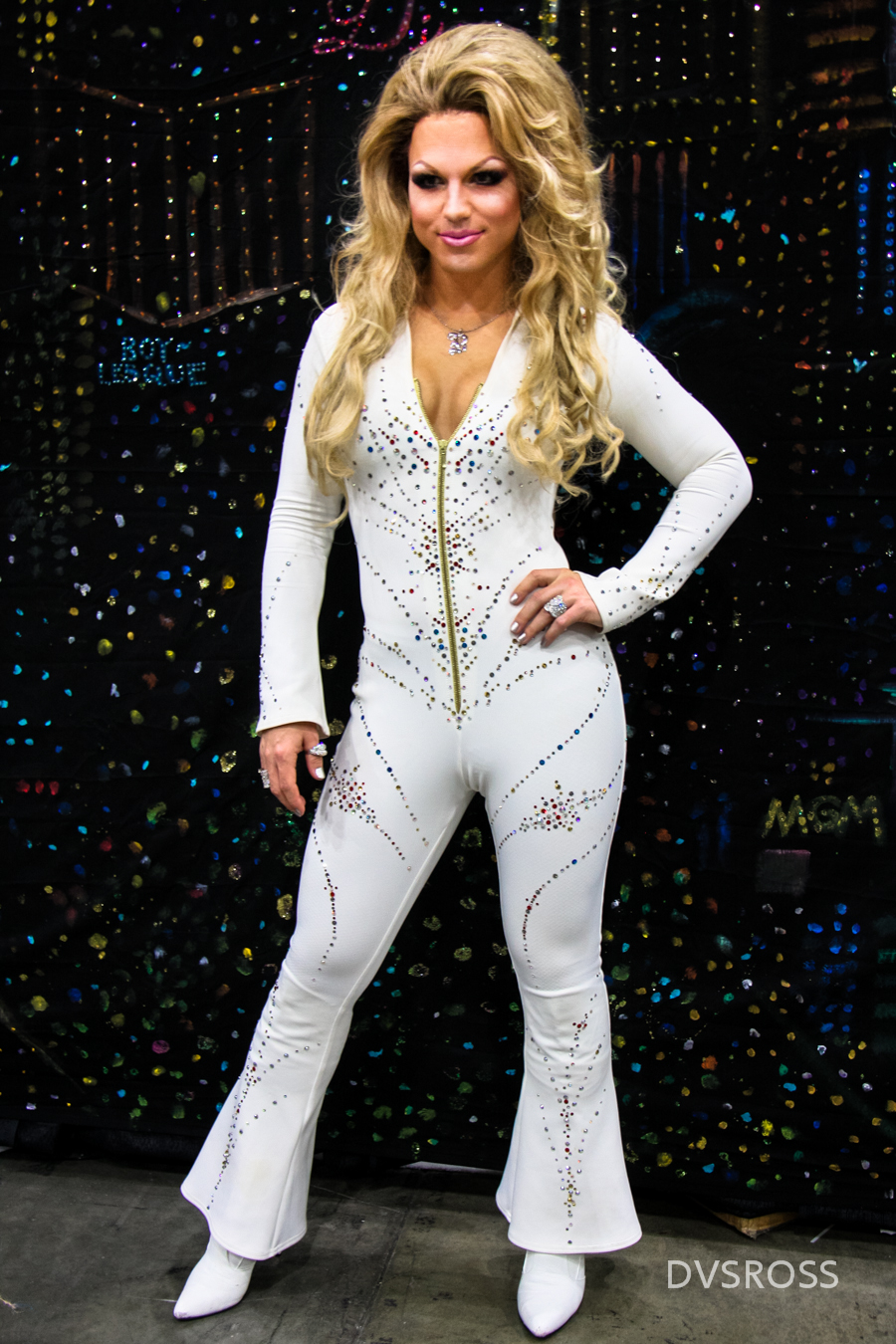
- Barry at RuPaul's DragCon LA in 2018
- Born: Derrick Prentice Barry; July 18, 1983 (age 43); Modesto, California, U.S.
- Occupations: Drag queen, Impersonator
- Years active: 2003–present
- Known for: RuPaul's Drag Race (season 8); RuPaul's Drag Race All Stars (season 5); America's Got Talent (season 3)
- Website: http://derrickbarry.com/

Derrick Prentice Barry (born July 18, 1983) is an American drag performer, Britney Spears impersonator and reality television personality. He is best known for competing on the third season of America's Got Talent (2008), and later the eighth season of RuPaul's Drag Race (2016) and fifth season of RuPaul's Drag Race All Stars (2020). Outside of reality television, Derrick Barry has toured internationally, released several musical singles, and has numerous film and television credits.

== Early life ==
Barry, born July 18, 1983, was raised in Modesto, California. He first saw Britney Spears when he was 15 in her "...Baby One More Time" music video on MTV, and first went to see her in concert in 2002. His first time in drag was when he dressed as Spears for Halloween in 2003. His second time dressing as Spears was two weeks later on November 17, 2003, at the audience of The Tonight Show where Spears was a guest star. Derrick was the 2010 representative for a National anti-bullying organization Don't H8 as Miss Don't H8 DIVA where he was also awarded Hall of Fame, LEGEND Award, Lifetime Achievement Award, and Presidential Hall of Champions.

== Career ==
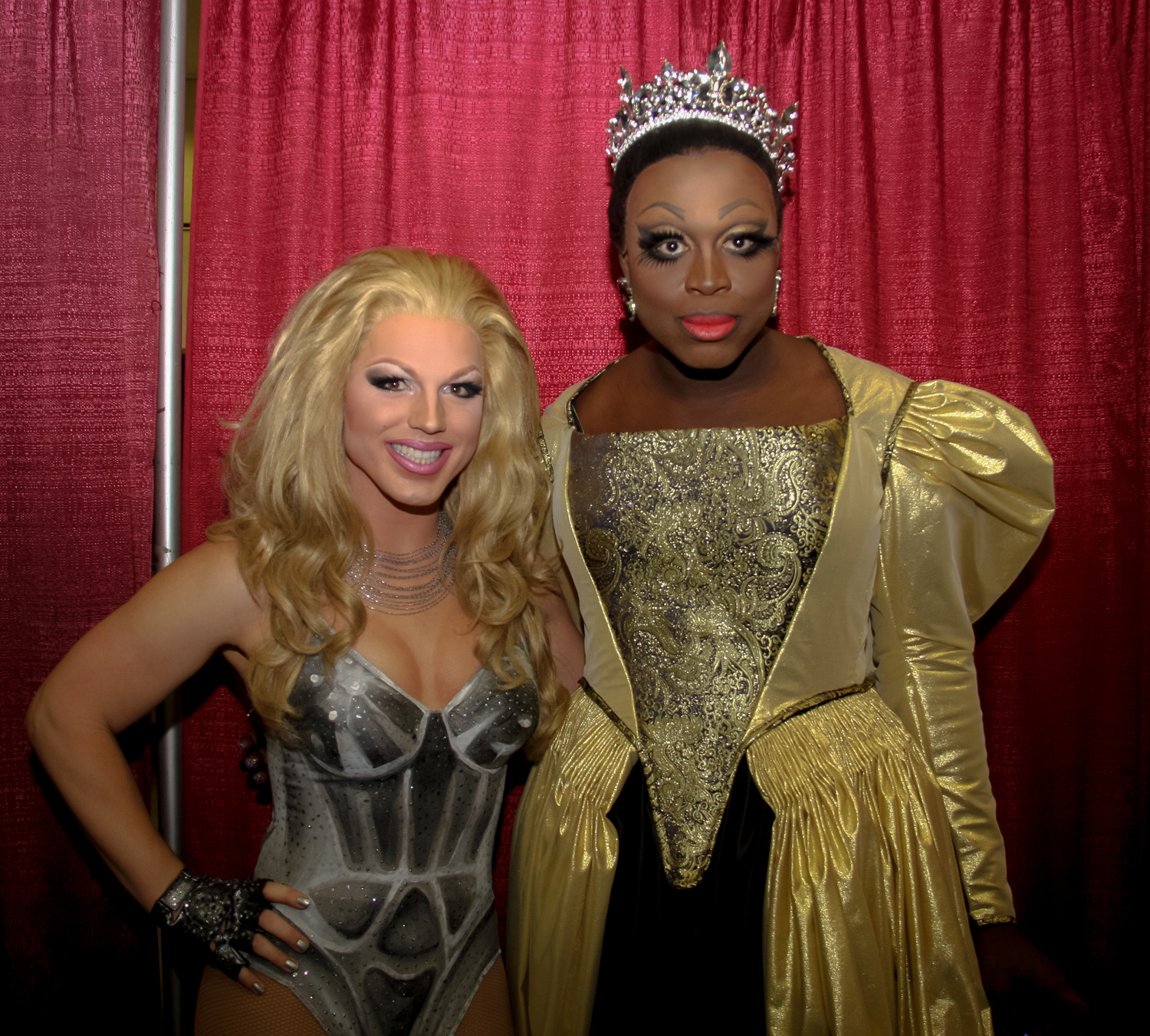
Derrick Barry (left) and Bob the Drag Queen (right) in 2017

Barry first gained attention when he competed on the third season of America's Got Talent in 2008, with his talent being a Britney impersonator. He made it past the auditions, but was eliminated in the quarterfinals. After the show, he appeared in the music videos for Eminem's "We Made You" and Katy Perry's "Waking Up in Vegas" in 2009. He was brought on stage by Madonna during one of her performances on her Rebel Heart Tour in 2015.

It was announced that Barry would be competing with 11 other drag queens for the eighth season of RuPaul's Drag Race on February 1, 2016. He was the one-hundredth queen to be seen competing on the show in the first episode. He was eliminated in the eighth episode after losing a lip sync to Bob the Drag Queen, and placing fifth.

In acting, he first appeared as the character Julie in an episode of Dig in 2015. He appeared in Sharknado: The 4th Awakens in 2016. He played the character Kimberly in War on Everyone in 2016.

He appeared as a guest for the first challenge in the premiere of season eleven of Drag Race. He appeared with Vanessa Vanjie Mateo and Silky Nutmeg Ganache for an episode of the fourteenth season of Germany's Next Topmodel in 2019.

In September 2019, at RuPaul's DragCon NYC, Barry was named as one of a rotating cast of a dozen Drag Race queens in RuPaul's Drag Race Live!, a Las Vegas show residency from January to August 2020 at the Flamingo Las Vegas. The show will feature RuPaul's music and seven of the 12 queens: Barry, Aquaria (winner of season ten), Asia O'Hara (season ten), Coco Montrese (season five, All Stars season two), Yvie Oddly (winner of season eleven), Eureka O'Hara (seasons nine and ten, All Stars season six), India Ferrah (season three, All Stars season five), Kahanna Montrese (season eleven), Kameron Michaels (season ten), Kim Chi (season eight), Naomi Smalls (season eight, All Stars season four), and Shannel (season one, All Stars one). Barry had prior experience working in Vegas drag shows, being a part Frank Marino's Divas Las Vegas and starring in Drag Queen Cuisine at House of Blues. In March 2022, Barry, alongside the rest of the RuPaul's Drag Race Live! cast, performed with Katy Perry during her Play concert residency at Resorts World Las Vegas.

Barry joined Eve in her performance of Supermodel by RuPaul during her appearance on The Talk. In 2020, Barry returned for the fifth season of RuPaul's Drag Race All Stars, where he was the first queen eliminated from the competition, placing 10th overall. In June 2021, he was a featured performer at Nashville's OUTLOUD Music Festival. He appears in RuPaul's Drag Race Live Untucked (2024).

=== Music ===
Barry released his first single, "BOOMBOOM" with Chris Cox on May 6, 2016.

== Personal life ==
As of January 2017, Barry is in a polyamorous relationship with Nick San Pedro and Mackenzie Claude, a fellow drag queen who goes by the name Nebraska Thunderfuck, a drag daughter of Alaska Thunderfuck. In 2017, Barry generated controversy when he mistakenly stated in a Billboard round table discussion that people were killed during the Stonewall riots; Willam Belli, also present at the discussion, corrected him. Willam later based her song "Derrick" on the incident. Barry appeared in the music video for "Derrick".

== Filmography ==
=== Movies ===
Year	Title	Role
2016	Sharknado: The 4th Awakens	
2016	War on Everyone	Kimberly
2018	A Queen for the People	Herself

=== Television ===
Year	Title	Role	Notes	Ref(s)
2008	America's Got Talent	Herself	Quarter-finals	
2015	Dig	Julie	Guest	
2016	RuPaul's Drag Race	Herself	Contestant (5th place)	
2016	RuPaul's Drag Race: Untucked	Herself	RuPaul's Drag Race companion show	
2016	Gay for Play Game Show Starring RuPaul	Herself	Guest	
2016	Graves	Drag Queen Margaret	Episode: "That Dare Not Speak"	
2017	Hey Qween!	Herself	Guest	
2019	Germany's Next Topmodel	Herself	Guest	
2019	The Talk	Backup dancer		
2019	Will and Grace	Drag Queen	Guest appearance	
2020	RuPaul's Drag Race All Stars (season 5)	Herself	Contestant (10th place)	
2020	RuPaul's Drag Race All Stars: Untucked (season 2)	Herself	Contestant (10th place)	
2020	RuPaul's Drag Race: Vegas Revue	Herself	Main Cast	
2022	RuPaul's Drag Race (season 14)	Herself	Special guest; Episode: "Reunited!" - S14	
2023	RuPaul's Drag Race (season 15)	Herself	Special guest; Episode: "Reunited!" - S15	
2024	RuPaul's Drag Race (season 16)	Herself	Special guest; Episodes: "Rate-A-Queen", "Queen Choice Awards" - S16	

=== Web series ===
Year	Title		Notes	Ref.
2016	RuPaul's Drag Race: Untucked	Herself	Season 8	
2016	Bobbin' Around	Herself	Guest	
2016–Present	Wait, What?	Herself	Guest (Season 1), Co-host	
2017	Spilling the Tea	Herself	Guest	
2019–22	The Pit Stop	Herself	Guest, 2 episodes	
2019	ASMR Queens	Herself	Co-Host	
2019	Iconic	Herself	Guest	
2019	Try Guys	Herself	Episode: "The Try Guys Lip Sync Battle Drag Queens"	
2020	Couple$ for Ca$h	Herself	Guest	
2020	The X Change Rate	Herself	Guest	
2020	Whatcha Packin'	Herself	Guest	
2021	Cosmo Queens	Herself	Guest	
2022	Vanjie: 24 Hours of Love	Herself	Guest	
2022	Portrait of a Queen	Herself	Episode: "Jaida Essence Hall"	
2025	Give It To Me Straight	Herself	Guest	
2025	Very Delta	Herself	Guest	

- Tongue Thai'd (2025)

=== Music videos ===
Year	Title	Artist
2009	"We Made You"	Eminem
2009	"Waking Up in Vegas" (Director's Cut)	Katy Perry
2015	Not a Pearl	Willam Belli
2016	"Purse First"	Bob the Drag Queen
2019	"B.F.A. (Best Friend's Ass)"	Dimitri Vegas & Like Mike, Paris Hilton
2020	"Gigging"	Yvie Oddly
2020	"Derrick"	Willam Belli
2022	"The Motto" (Official Drag Video)	Ava Max and Tiësto

== Discography ==
=== Singles ===
Year	Title
2016	BOOMBOOM (featuring Chris Cox)

=== Albums ===
Year	Title
2025	HEY DERRICK
