= Diego Montoya (artist) =

American visual artist, and fashion designer

- Born: Diego Montoya born 1982 or 1983 (age 43–44); Lima, Peru
- Education: Fashion design, fine art
- Years active: 2004-present
- Website: DiegoLovesYou.com

Diego Montoya (born in 1982) is a Peruvian visual artist and fashion designer based in New York. His work consists of gallery installations and costume designs made from recycled materials. Montoya has produced designs for galleries and has closely worked with queer performers and drag queens who have appeared in the show Rupaul's Drag Race.

== Early life and education ==
Diego Montoya was born and raised in Lima, Peru. Later on, at the age of ten, his family immigrated to Miami, Florida, and settled down in the Little Haiti area. Montoya was introduced to the fashion world during his childhood through his grandmother, who was a dressmaker. He took an interest in fashion upon watching her sew intricate party dresses. In an interview with Vogue, he stated that at the time he wasn’t old enough to help with the pieces, but he would observe his grandmother’s work and hand items she needed.

His first introduction to the queer scene was at fifteen, when he began attending drag shows in the area.

In college, at Florida State University, he studied fashion design and fine art; he found himself sketching drag queens and club kids. He chose as his muse during this period, performance artist and actress Amanda Lepore, “She was all over my storyboards.” Montoya gained experience designing for performers in school working with the college's circus, including his acrobat boyfriend; it “helped hone an aesthetic based on ‘savage beauty.’" After graduating in 2004, he moved to New York City.

== Career ==
=== Early career: 2004-late 2000s ===
Montoya notes drag as a queer art form, “In sensibility, in approach, in its imagination: This is queer art.” He cites as an early inspiration the 1981 wedding dress of Princess Diana (designed by David Emanuel and Elizabeth Emanuel). “It was so obnoxious and beautiful to me.” He was also inspired by the joyfulness of John Galliano, and the darkness of Alexander McQueen. Montoya found the drag scene in New York City stale in the mid-2000s, moving there in 2004, until the Brooklyn area started transforming with what he characterized as a “more deconstructed” and experimental voice. For his own outfits he wore custom onesies made of spandex “to take some pressure off myself by creating playful and maybe a little ridiculous aliases.” He wore them exclusively for his first four years in the city, later shooting a series called Gay Superheroes, with them as the basis. He says it was also dangerous to go out in drag during these times, but was mixing and collaborating with “amazing queer performers.”

Initially when he moved to New York City, he worked in fashion for several years while freelancing in costume design. One costuming project was for Clara's Nutcracker, a re-imagined abstraction of The Nutcracker from the protagonist's perspective “at age 6, 20, 40, 80 all happening at the same time performed at this former glass factory in Queens.” The piece was from two friends, writer/director Josh William Gelb, and choreographed by Katie Rose McLaughlin. He took a fluid approach with all four Claras in all white contrasted to the industrial surroundings. In addition, Montoya was also highlighted in an exhibit at the Indianapolis Museum of Art at Newfields titled, Resplendent Dreams: Reawakening the Rococo. This exhibit opened on June 6, 2025, and it featured pieces by drag queens like Sasha Velour, Blair St. Clair, etc.

=== Installation art: late 2000s-mid 2010s ===
In the late 2000s he was hired full-time designing window displays. The shift got him thinking about designing “more conceptually about spacial design and environments.” He started doing nightlife event art installations which led to site-specific art installations. He works with recycled materials creating “larger-than-life,” “innovative, and subversive” installations and costumes for galleries, stores and “queer performers.”

He cites this period as having the most growth artistically; taking weeks to construct, they were in “massive warehouses or abandoned theaters” and were usually collaborative efforts. He was the design director for the MIXNYC Queer Experimental Film Festival from 2010 to 2015, producing entire spaces. He first attended MIXNYC in 2006 and got more networked and involved; he designed a t-shirt for the 2008 festival, staff uniforms for 2009, and was asked to design the space starting in 2010. He either staged his installations at home, where he had a sewing station, or had a temporary space. There would be a frenzy to complete everything in place, it was open to the public for a week, then taken apart. He worked on a series in the mid-2010s, Future Rituals, merging costume design and environment art, “to make interactive vignettes.” According to Carnegie Mellon University’s Art School, Montoya “creates hyper visual pieces that are both opulent and bizarre exploring themes of ritual and subcultural.” For several seasons Montoya had his own fashion line with pieces at the Leslie-Lohman Prince Street Project Space.

In December 2015 he presented as part of “Superfine! House of Art and Design" at Art Basel Miami with "Ascend With You," a 3,000-square-foot hanging sculpture piece. Montoya said of returning to his neighborhood, "Miami specifically is super-kitsch...It’s all pastel colors and neon, and that kind of playfulness is definitely in my work.” In May 2016 Montoya won Best Visual Artist at the Brooklyn Nightlife Awards. As of October 2018, Montoya has done art installations at Leslie-Lohman Museum, Abrons Arts Center, Same Art Museum, 29Rooms LA, and Art Basel Miami.

=== Collaboration with Sasha Velour for RuPaul’s Drag Race ===
In late 2016, a “popular Brooklyn queen,” Sasha Velour, contacted Montoya to create some couture for an unnamed purpose, which turned out to be the ninth season of RuPaul’s Drag Race (RPDR), the show started airing in March 2017 with Montoya's designs as her entrance look. Velour had fallen in love with Montoya's headpieces and masks that he would post on Instagram. (Note: Velour stated, “Diego’s influence is as much his own Peruvian heritage as my Russian fantasy … but the result feels timeless — both futuristic and historical; deeply ornamented but also very graphic and simple; hugely varied but also consistent.”) Montoya says, "I'm obsessed with things that are beautiful but in an aggressive way," noting many of his pieces are heavily ornamented. "It's just what I'm naturally drawn to. I identify as a queer artist, and I think a lot of that visibility is campy and has a lot of things that I love, but is also aggressive." Montoya builds on the character or persona a queen has created and designs with that in mind. Vice noted Velour as a perfect muse for Montoya as she has a reputation for more cerebral drag— “taking the history of the genre and pulling it apart to reconstruct and move it forward”.

For the finale, Velour contacted Montoya again, and they collaborated to create a red carpet entrance look, as well as an outfit for the competition performance. The entrance look was a “cobalt gown with a corresponding Queen Elizabeth-esque ruff” based on Francis Ford Coppola’s 1991 film Dracula’s character Lucy Westerna, a vivacious beautiful young woman who falls victim to Count Dracula. They had intended for shades of regal vampire red but had to change to colors that would not blend in with the theater’s background. Later Velour would have Montoya deconstruct it and rework it “for a queen on the go.”

For the performance they created an “ornate and beautiful,” but "kinda scary" white dress she wore for the winning performance. Her ensemble included Montoya's tearaway and pearl “felt, lace, and hand-beaded mask held together by magnets that she cracked open like an egg to reveal her face.” They attempted a futuristic egg effect as Velour had been called the Fabergé egg queen, it covered her entire head. According to MTV News, Velour's “more baroque, performance art-inspired drag that had long existed off the show” was put on equal footing with more popular “campy or Insta[gram]-glamorous” drag forms. The finale set a ratings record for VH1. Out’s Coco Romack stated “without a doubt, [Velour will] go down in herstory as one of the most fashion-forward competitors” the series has seen.

For Montoya, the finale outfit and performance brought in a “flood of requests” for his couture and increased his Instagram followers five-fold to over 10,000. Montoya said it led to “new opportunities and kind of changed my life,” he was still working out of his room and had to throw away his bed to make room for more dresses. Within two years he was able to forego his restaurant job, and open a Bushwick, Brooklyn design studio with five employees. Velour said

“His designs are beautiful and sculptural … so much more than clothes. I think of everything he creates for me as a piece of art… It feels very lucky and surreal that I now have the largest Diego Montoya collection in the world.”

In June 2018 Velour crowned the tenth season winner, Aquaria, with a Montoya-designed dress that invoked an alien version of Eve from the Garden of Eden.

=== Further works, 2017-present ===
Montoya has since collaborated with more Drag Race queens including: “Ongina, Kameron Michaels, Asia O’Hara, Eureka O’Hara, Monét X Change, Pearl, Jinkx Monsoon, Blair St. Clair, Bob the Drag Queen, Kim Chi, Aja, Honey Davenport, and Soju.” Montoya notes that when Drag Race started in 2009 the female illusion was more central to the queens look, passing as a woman was almost enough. As of 2019, every aspect is exaggerated, with the custom garments costing from $2,000-10,000.

In October 2017, Montoya's costumes were used for the world premiere of The Power of Emotion: The Apartment—“a trilogy of works that explores how we watch, hear, and perform emotion”—directed by Katherine Brook for the Tele-Violet company with the TAK ensemble at the Abrons Arts Center.

In October 2018 jazz singer-composer and bassist Esperanza Spalding released 12 Little Spells, her seventh studio album, a twelve-part song cycle based on parts of the human anatomy. Each song was released on its own day, with a corresponding video; later she did a series of twelve pop-up concerts across the U.S. tied to each song. She collaborated with other artists on various aspects of the video and live performances, and commissioned Montoya to do a series of dresses for the effort; the live shows were filmed for a concert release.

In late 2018, Montoya again worked with Sasha Velour for her Smoke and Mirrors tour which started in Australia and New Zealand in January, and later throughout the U.S. In it she revives a vaudeville-era conceit of something going wrong with the show, then having to go on with the show anyway—but with technology as the show is multimedia with live projection mapping. For the first act Montoya designed a couture full bodysuit in red, and covered with jewels; each number has its own costuming, half in white velvet, that layers over the bodysuit, and scenery—projected onto the velvet pieces—layered on top. In the second act, Velour's story is about her transforming and maturing, she wears another bodysuit that ultimately helps her morph into a tree from her childhood. Velour stated, “all of the beautiful fabric choices, the way things move, and the way things sparkle in the light...those are the things that Diego is really passionate about, so he was able to improve upon my ideas in incredible ways.”

As a first, Montoya designed Shangela's dress for her red carpet debut at the 2019 Oscars in February. Shangela is the first drag queen to walk the Oscar's red carpet, a long tradition for film stars, in drag; she was dressed in an “icy lilac mermaid gown with draped details and asymmetrical gold beading,” (seen here). Montoya had ten days to make the dress, including five days of his team hand-beading. Shangela walked the red carpet with her longtime friend, actress Jenifer Lewis, who wore a custom copper suit also produced by Montoya. Shangela was a supporting actress in Bradley Cooper’s A Star Is Born (2018) alongside Willam Belli, and featured performers Cooper and Lady Gaga. In September 2018, Shangela also wore a Montoya dress, a Shakespearean-inspired “golden number, dripping in jewels,” that she commissioned for the London red carpet premiere of the movie. In May 2019 Them noted his influences as “the kitsch, excess, and color of Miami, where he was raised after moving from Lima, Peru, as well as the drag queens and club kids he encountered growing up.”

In September 2019, Montoya's costumes were part of the world premiere of Joseph Keckler's Let Me Die, “a genre-bending performance” opera performed as part of Opera Philadelphia's O19 festival.

For their work in the HBO series We're Here, Montoya has won two Primetime Emmy Awards.
