= Drive 'N Drag =

American drag show tour

Drive 'N Drag was a series of drag shows in 2020 and 2021 that featured drag performers from the American television series RuPaul's Drag Race. Its shows were held at outdoor drive-in venues.

The first leg of the tour started on July 17, 2020, and ended on August 2, 2020. Featured on the lineup were Aquaria, Asia O'Hara, Acid Betty, Gigi Goode, Monét X Change, Kameron Michaels, Kim Chi, Naomi Smalls, Plastique Tiara, Vanessa Vanjie Mateo, Violet Chachki, and Yvie Oddly.

The spring 2021 tour started in San Francisco on May 7 and ended in New York City on June 27. The 2021 cast included Aquaria, Bianca Del Rio, Kameron Michaels, Naomi Smalls, Plastique Tiara, and Violet Chachki. Later added were Season 13's Gottmik and Rosé.

== Dates ==
- July 17-19, 2020, Paramus, NJ
- July 24-26, 2020, Los Angeles, CA
- July 31 - August 2, 2020, Chicago, IL
- February 19–20, 2021, Atlanta, GA
- February 23–24, 2021, Tampa, FL
- February 26–27, 2021, Fort Lauderdale, FL
- March 2–3, 2021, Houston, TX
- March 5–7, 2021, Austin, TX
- March 9–10, 2021, San Antonio, TX
- March 12–13, 2021, Dallas, TX
- March 16–17, 2021, Phoenix, AZ
- March 19–21, 2021, Los Angeles, CA
- April 21, 2021, live broadcast
- May 7-9, 2021, San Francisco, CA
- May 11-12, 2021, Portland, OR
- May 14-16, 2021, Seattle, WA
- May 20-22, 2021, Denver, CO
- May 25-26, 2021, Minneapolis, MN
- May 28-30, 2021, Chicago, IL
- June 1-2, 2021, Indianapolis, IN
- June 4-6, 2021, Washington, D.C.
- June 8-9, 2021, Raleigh, NC
- June 11-13, 2021, Philadelphia, PA
- June 15-16, 2021, Pittsburgh, PA
- June 18-20, Boston, MA
- June 25-27, 2021, New York City, NY
  - For Pride Weekend. Featured GottMik, Rosé, Aquaria, Asia O’Hara, Kameron Michaels, Violet Chachki, Vanjie

== See also ==
- Impact of the COVID-19 pandemic on the LGBTQ community
