= Diego Montoya =

Diego Montoya may refer to:

== Sportspeople ==
- Diego Montoya (cyclist), Colombian road racing cyclist, see 2006 Vuelta a Colombia
- Diego Montoya (footballer), with Bolivian club Nacional Potosí
- Diego Montoya (racing driver), former Colombian racing driver

== Others ==
- Diego León Montoya Sánchez, Colombian drug trafficker
- Diego Montoya (artist)
- Diego Montoya Mendoza
