= RuPaul's Drag Race Live! =

Concert residency based on RuPaul's Drag Race

RuPaul's Drag Race Live
- Residency by the cast of RuPaul's Drag Race
- Promotional poster for the residency
- Location: Paradise, Nevada, U.S.
- Venue: Flamingo Showroom
- Start date: January 30, 2020
- End date: December 31, 2026
- No. of shows: 1,500
- Producers: Voss Events; World of Wonder
- Website: rupaulsdragracelive.com

RuPaul's Drag Race Live is a concert residency featuring several past competitors from the television series of the same name and its franchise. The performances are held every weeknight at the Flamingo Showroom and co-produced by Voss Events and World of Wonder. The residency showcased a various comedy, dance numbers, lip-syncs, and original music directed by RuPaul and choreographed by Jamal Sims.

The cast opened the concert residency on January 30, 2020, but due to the COVID-19 pandemic affecting live entertainment, performances were put on an indefinite hiatus until 2021. It is scheduled to end on December 31, 2026, after 1,500 shows.

== History ==
=== 2019–2020: Development and cancellation ===
The concert residency was originally announced at RuPaul's DragCon NYC on September 8, 2019, and unveiled two rotating casts from the reality competition television series of the same name. The first rotating cast featured Asia O'Hara, Derrick Barry, Kameron Michaels, Naomi Smalls, Vanessa Vanjie Mateo, and Yvie Oddly, with Aquaria, Coco Montrese, Eureka O'Hara, India Ferrah, Kahanna Montrese, Kim Chi, and Shannel as the second rotating cast. (Note: Although they appeared in promotional material, the second rotating cast did not performed.)

RuPaul was appointed as director with Jamal Sims as choreographer for the residency; Ryan Grainger acted as assistant choreographer and dance captain for the Pit Crew. The concert was revealed to place at the Flamingo Showroom, where it formerly housed the eleven-year run of the Donny and Marie Osmond concert residency. The variety musical is co-produced by Voss Events and World of Wonder. Ticket pre-sale access commenced on September 10, followed by the general ticket sale three days later, via Ticketmaster.

"It was definitely disappointing, [especially] because we had all been touring prior to coming to Las Vegas and we were looking forward to doing the show and staying in one place, finding that consistency and leading a somewhat normal life."

— Asia O'Hara, explaining how the pandemic affected the concert residency to Las Vegas Weekly.

The residency opened with its first rotating cast on January 30, 2020, with the scheduled performance set to last through next year. Soon the concert residency ran until March 15, placed on hiatus due to the COVID-19 pandemic affecting live entertainment.

=== 2021–present: Rescheduled and newcomers ===
Rescheduled performances from the residency were later announced on July 12, 2021. The same first rotating cast resumed at the Flamingo Showroom on August 5. The next year, newcomers Eureka O'Hara, Jaida Essence Hall, Plastique Tiara, and Trinity K. Bonet joined the cast of the residency concert. Latrice Royale and Kennedy Davenport were announced as the new additions to the performing cast; Jorgeous is also set to perform in the upcoming year.

The variety concert later marked their 300th show on October 6, 2022. Deja Skye and Daya Betty later joined as new cast members for the concert residency on April 21, 2023. Before the cast performed their 500th show, Bosco, Lawrence Chaney, Nicky Doll, and Pangina Heals were introduced for the live residency on May 31.

The residency cast celebrated its 700th mark in March 2024.

== Production ==
The live production incorporates an insular plot such as the format of the drag reality competition, with the performers portraying a character competing for the crown. It starts with the host of the performance announcing the "mini-challenge" and "maxi-challenge" to shake up the crowd. Throughout the show, RuPaul makes an appearance from pre-recorded video clips. At the end of the concert, the audience has the opportunity to act out as judges and choose the winner of the "final lip-sync battle" using the majority applause. Andy Walmsley, an English production designer, created and ranked the residency's scenery as number one showcasing its "ambitious creative energy" for the cast. In the interview with the Las Vegas Review-Journal, Walmsley "channelled [his] inner drag queen and designed a truly over-the-top, [...] glitzy-cartoonish, [and] you-go-girl-design."

In April 2024, Derrick Barry mentioned to her fellow castmate, Trinity K. Bonet, that they both "didn't mesh well together" and made "your dream job a nightmare" at the residency. Trinity replied back in an Instagram post that she understood why they "won't reply" about her return on the show. Given Derrick's comments, everyone knew she had "severe arthritis" in both legs which made it difficult to work, and ended up quitting.

== Critical reception ==
Brock Radke of the Las Vegas Sun witnessed the audience screaming "support and the cumulative result of all this exuberance is a jubilant, victorious vibe [...] in this venue." The performers are "wildly charismatic" with Naomi Smalls bringing "over-the-top glamour", Kameron Michaels' "unbelievable athleticism and undeniable presence", and Derrick Barry's "peerless portrayal of Britney Spears could be its own show." Radke also adds that Asia O'Hara presents the residency "with charm and grace" which amazes the audience with laughs. Radke sees the concert as exciting and successful, he also hopes it picks up more momentum.

== Original music ==
Many of the performances use various songs from its franchise or RuPaul's discography. A soundtrack extended play was released on January 27, 2020. This featured four original songs co-written by RuPaul, Tom Campbell, and Leland, with Gabe Lopez as producer. Three out of the four songs were performed as a medley in the semifinal episode of the twelfth season of RuPaul's Drag Race.

== Television and media ==
Rotating cast members during their "Losing is the New Winning" performance for RuPaul's Drag Race

A docuseries based on the concert residency was announced in July 2020. During the fifth season finale of RuPaul's Drag Race All Stars, an extended preview aired showcasing the six-part documentary. RuPaul's Drag Race: Vegas Revue later premiered through VH1 on August 21, the first episode was dedicated to Chi Chi DeVayne, a former contestant of RuPaul's Drag Race who later died in the same month.

The fourteenth-season reunion and the finale of RuPaul's Drag Race were filmed at the same venue with the rotating cast performing "Losing is the New Winning" alongside the contestants. In the same episode, RuPaul was awarded the key to the city of Las Vegas with April 22 being officially RuPaul Day. The finale filming took place "a few weeks ago" and lasting under five hours.

The production company announced another six-part documentary in October 2023 and set to premiere in the upcoming year. The docuseries premiered through WOW Presents Plus on April 17, 2024. During the sixteenth season of RuPaul's Drag Race, an episode showcased the contestants giving makeovers to the Pit Crew members of the residency concert.
