= Vanjie: 24 Hours of Love =

Television series

- Genre: Reality
- Starring: Vanessa Vanjie Mateo
- Country of origin: United States
- Original language: English
- No. of seasons: 1
- No. of episodes: 8

Production
- Production location: Los Angeles
- Camera setup: Multi-camera
- Running time: 15–35 minutes
- Production company: World of Wonder

Original release
- Network: WOW Presents Plus
- Release: June 9 – July 28, 2022

Vanjie: 24 Hours of Love is an American reality competition television series premiered on WOW Presents Plus. It is the streaming service's first unscripted reality original programming. The series sees Vanessa Vanjie Mateo selecting a suitor from 18 bachelors within 24 hours, at the Vansion. Guest appearances have been made by Derrick Barry, Gottmik, and Violet Chachki.

== Contestants ==
Ages, names, and cities stated are at the time of filming.

Contestants of Vanjie: 24 Hours of Love
| Contestant | Age | Outcome | Place |
|---|---|---|---|
| Jack Janowicz | 26 | Winner | 1st |
| Jarrett Lantz | 35 | Runners-up | 2nd |
| Derek Viveiros | 39 | Runners-up | 3rd |
| Jozea Flores | 30 | Hour 3 | 4th |
| Noel Anaya | 34 | Hour 3 | 5th |
| Dakota Payne | 32 | Hour 4 | 6th |
| Ernesto Flores | 36 | Hour 4 | 7th |
| Javonte "Blu" Rosello | 28 | Hour 8 | 8th |
| Ulisses Rivera | 30 | Hour 8 | 9th |
| Brandon Karson Jordan | 27 | Hour 11 | 10th |
| Anthony Kairouz | 23 | Hour 13 | 11th |
| Craig Handy | 31 | Hour 15 | 12th |
| Nick Lorenzini | 34 | Hour 17 | 13th |
| Blake Van Amserfoorth | 30 | — (Note: Eliminated by Vanjie's mother, Anabell Velez, in episode three.) | 14th |
| Kishan Patel | 32 | Hour 21 | 15th |
| Tyler Renner | 30 | Hour 21 | 16th |
| Tommy Pardee | 33 | Hour 22 | 17th |
| Zuri Green | 46 | Hour 23 | 18th |

== Episodes ==
| No. | Title | Original release date |
|---|---|---|
| 1 | "Too Many Men, Too Little Time" | June 9, 2022 |
Eighteen suitors arrived at the Vansion (in Los Angeles) looking for love. Soon they found out that they were competing for Vanjie's heart. Eliminated: Zuri Green
| 2 | "Hot Tub Showdown" | June 16, 2022 |
Seventeen suitors compete on a swimsuit runway at the Vansion's pool, with Vanjie and Derrick Barry judging their runway. Eliminated: Tommy Pardee, Tyler Renner and Kishan Patel
| 3 | "The Wrath of Mom" | June 23, 2022 |
Fourteen suitors are in a heated argument about sex workers. Vanjie's mother comes in for a BBQ at the Vansion. Eliminated: Blake Van Amserfoorth
| 4 | "Love and Uranus" | June 30, 2022 |
Thirteen suitors start questioning when Vanjie calls in an astrologer, Joe Romanini. Gottmik and Violet Chachki appear at the Vansion's elevator at the end. Eliminated: Nick Lorenzini and Craig Handy
| 5 | "The Bitching Hour" | July 7, 2022 |
Eleven suitors are at risk when Gottmik and Violet Chachki host and roast at the Vansion. Later on, there was a pool chat then someone was caught napping. Eliminated: Anthony Kairouz and Brandon Karson Jordan
| 6 | "The Come Up" | July 14, 2022 |
Nine suitors are napping or doing something else until dawn at the Vansion, while someone is making a move with Vanjie. Later on, the suitors are trying to sell a toy to Vanjie. Eliminated: Ulisses Rivera
| 7 | "Wig Jock" | July 21, 2022 |
Eight suitors need to impress Vanjie with their low drag skills, after their mini competition; Vanjie's mother comes back for breakfast. Eliminated: Javonte "Blu" Rosello, Ernesto Flores and Dakota Payne
| 8 | "True Love" | July 28, 2022 |
Five suitors are doing a lie detector in front of Vanjie and her mother. After two suitors are eliminated, the final three suitors have their final shot with Vanjie. Eliminated: Noel Anaya, Jozea Flores, Derek Viveiros and Jarrett Lantz Winner: Jack Janowicz

=== Notes ===
Jack and Vanjie reportedly dated for at least 10 months after the completion of filming. As of December 25, 2025, Jack is engaged to Dylan Caberto, who he met in Disneyland in the spring of 2023.
