= Gigi Goode =

American drag performer (born 1997)

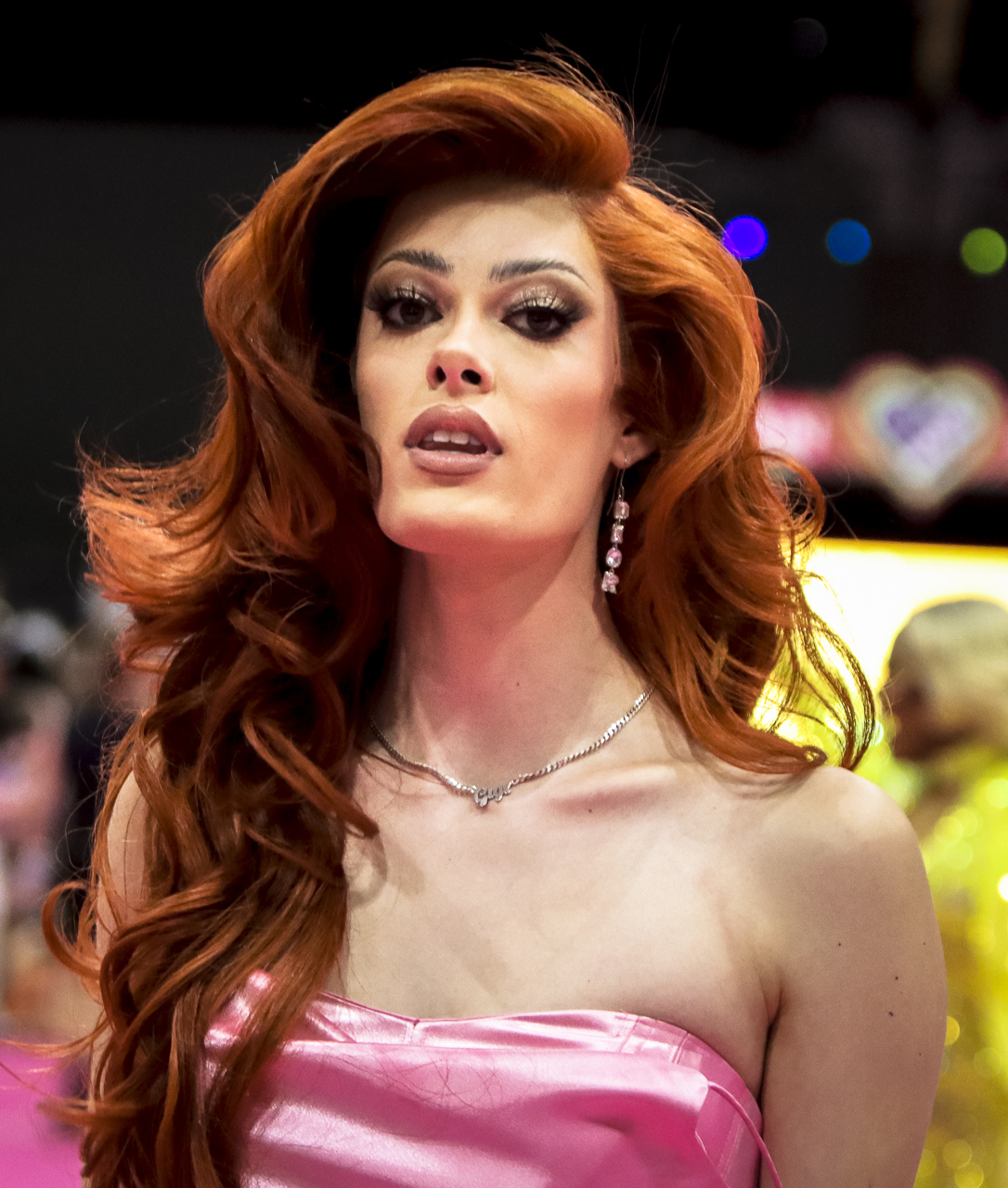
- Gigi Goode at RuPaul's DragCon LA, 2022
- Born: December 2, 1997 (age 28); Illinois, U.S.
- Occupations: Drag queen; fashion designer
- Television: RuPaul's Drag Race (season 12)
- Website: gigigoode.com

Gigi Goode (born December 2, 1997) is an American drag queen, fashion designer, and reality television personality known for being a runner-up on the twelfth season of the drag competition series RuPaul's Drag Race. Following her appearance on Drag Race, Goode was cast in the Drive 'N Drag concert series, appeared in multiple music videos, and participated in a Savage X Fenty fashion show. In 2020, she received a People's Choice Award in the Competition Contestant category.

== Early life and education ==
Goode was born on December 2, 1997, in Illinois, and has Scottish and Scandinavian ancestry. She was raised in Woodstock. Her mother, Kristi, is a costume and interior designer. Goode was introduced to LGBTQ culture at the age of 12 by her openly gay uncle. She started doing drag at an early age with the help of her mother, who initially disapproved of it, and she performed in drag in public for the first time at age 15. She has said that her drag "became very 1950s and 1940s inspired".

Goode attended Woodstock High School, where she graduated in 2016. She attended Millikin University in Decatur, Illinois, where she majored in art and was awarded the David S. Monroe Art Award in 2017, which honors "outstanding achievement in art, recognizing students for their major, excellence in their work and exhibiting a professional attitude". She later dropped out of Millikin and moved to Los Angeles.

== Career ==
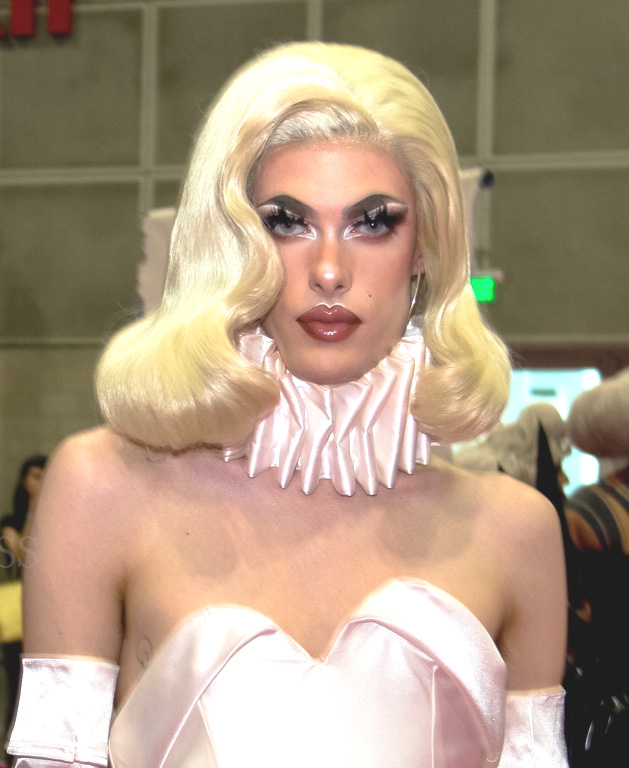
Gigi Goode in 2019

In 2020, Goode competed on the twelfth season of the reality competition series RuPaul's Drag Race, where she was the youngest contestant of the season and placed as a runner-up. Goode and her mother collaborated on many of the outfits Goode wore on the show. Goode won the main challenges in episodes 4, 6, 7, and 12. During Snatch Game, she impersonated Maria the Robot, a character based on the experimental humanoid robot Sophia. Jezebel called her portrayal of Maria "physical comedy gold" and "incredibly witty". Critics praised Goode's performance on the show, highlighting her fashion and comedy skills.

Goode participated in Werq the World Battle Royale, a livestreamed fundraiser and drag show held during the COVID-19 pandemic. In mid-2020, she was one of a dozen former Drag Race contestants who was cast in the Drive 'N Drag concert series. Goode appeared in the Halloween-themed World of Wonder variety special Bring Back My Ghouls with other contestants from season 12 of Drag Race in October 2020.

Goode appeared in the music video for Chester Lockhart's 2018 cover of "I Put a Spell on You". In 2020, she and fellow Drag Race contestant Valentina appeared in the music video for "I'm Ready" by Sam Smith and Demi Lovato. Goode and fellow Drag Race contestants Jaida Essence Hall and Shea Couleé appeared in the Savage X Fenty fashion show and Amazon Prime Video special Savage X Fenty Show Vol. 2. At the 46th People's Choice Awards, she won an award in the "Competition Contestant of 2020" category.

In 2024, Goode showcased her first fashion collection. Actress Nava Mau wore one of her designs at the red carpet of 76th Primetime Emmy Awards.

== Personal life ==
Initially identifying as genderfluid on RuPaul's Drag Race, Goode came out as transgender and non-binary on August 29, 2021, with a video on Instagram. She announced that she had started hormone replacement therapy in January 2021 and underwent facial feminization surgery. As of 2026, Goode has had breast surgery and identifies as a woman. Goode uses she/her pronouns, both in and out of drag.

During quarantine in 2020 she was living with the Los Angeles–based House of Avalon, which was described by Vogue's Liam Hess as a "troupe of queer creatives", as of April 2020.

== Filmography ==
=== Television ===
Year	Title	Role	Notes
2020	RuPaul's Drag Race	Herself	Runner-up (season 12)
2020	RuPaul's Drag Race: Untucked	Herself	Contestant
2020	Savage X Fenty Show Vol. 2	Herself	
2021	Generation	Drag queen	Episode "There's Something About Hamburger Mary's"
2023	Drag Me to Dinner	Herself	Hulu original reality series
2023	Avalon TV	Herself	World of Wonder original

=== Web series ===
Year	Title	Ref
2020	Whatcha Packin'	
2020	Bring Back My Ghouls	
2021	Out of the Closet	
2022	Bring Back My Girls	

=== Music videos ===
Year	Title	Artist
2018	"I Put a Spell on You"	Chester Lockhart
2018	"Born to Bleed"	Disasterina
2020	"I'm Ready"	Sam Smith and Demi Lovato
2022	"Let Us Die"	King Princess
2026	"Motivation"	Carly Rae Jepsen

== Discography ==
=== Featured singles ===
Title	Year	Album	Ref
"I'm That Bitch" (with the cast of RuPaul's Drag Race season 12)	2020	Non-album singles	
"Madonna: The Unauthorized Rusical" (with the cast of RuPaul's Drag Race season 12)	2020	Non-album singles	
"I Made It / Mirror Song / Losing Is the New Winning" (Las Vegas Live Medley) (with the cast of RuPaul's Drag Race season 12)	2020	Non-album singles	
"The Shady Bunch" (with the cast of RuPaul's Drag Race season 12)	2020	Non-album singles	

== See also ==
- List of non-binary people
