= Asia O'Hara =

American drag performer and costume designer (born 1982)

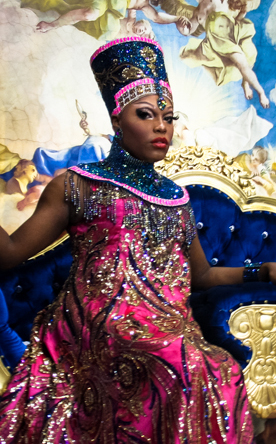
- Asia O’Hara at RuPaul's DragCon LA, 2018
- Born: Antwan Mason Lee; July 7, 1982 (age 44); Grand Prairie, Texas, U.S.
- Occupations: Drag queen; costume designer; entertainer
- Years active: 2003–present
- Known for: RuPaul's Drag Race (season 10)
- Website: asiaoharaland.com

Antwan Mason Lee (born July 7, 1982), better known by the stage name Asia O'Hara, is an American drag queen, reality television personality, and costume designer. She is most well known for competing on the tenth season of RuPaul's Drag Race, in which she placed fourth. Since her season aired in 2018, O'Hara has been a staple of several domestic and international tours that feature Drag Race contestants, including Werq the World, Christmas Queens and Drive 'N Drag. She has also appeared on a number of web series produced by World of Wonder, including Can Do Queens, which she co-hosts with Kameron Michaels. In June 2018, she released "Queen for Tonight", her debut single. Her second single, "Crown Up", was released on May 20, 2019, along with an accompanying music video. Since January 2020, she has been a staple cast member of RuPaul's Drag Race Live!, a residency show in Las Vegas, and also stars in the accompanying VH1 miniseries RuPaul's Drag Race: Vegas Revue.

As a professional entertainer, she has won several national titles in drag pageantry systems, including Miss Gay America in 2016.

== Life and career ==
O'Hara was born to Lois Helen Williams and grew up in Grand Prairie, Texas and has five sisters, who Asia helped to raise, and all of whom also became performers. Her parents are deceased. She moved to Dallas when she was 14, and in high school performed in band, color guard, and theater.

Her drag career began in the early 2000s, when she entered and won an amateur contest at the Rose Room in Dallas. The name Asia was taken from a close family member of hers, and the name O'Hara was given to her by her drag mother, Josephine O'Hara. Her drag grandmother is Texas pageant legend Sweet Savage and her drag father is Bob Taylor. O'Hara continued to perform and in the following years won many titles in the drag pageantry system, including three National titles. She has worked as a makeup artist and behind the scenes during pageants, helping to plan and promote preliminary competitions. O'Hara owns her own costume design company, Helen of Seven, in which she creates custom design pieces for clients including dance teams, color guards, ice skaters, and other drag performers.

As a dance and color guard instructor, O'Hara has taught at the high school level in Texas, leading her teams to statewide competition. She has performed often at the Rose Room Theatre & Lounge in Dallas, Texas since 2005, and has been a full-time showgirl there since 2009. She has also toured across the country performing, judging, and competing in pageants.

O'Hara was crowned Miss Gay America in October 2016, at the 2016 competition in Memphis, Tennessee. Winners of this title are known as the "Symbol of Excellence" of female impersonation and are expected to reign for one year, while performing official MGA responsibilities including touring, community service, and projecting an overall positive image for the LGBT community.

She is also close friends with Texas-native Drag Race alum Alyssa Edwards and the Davenport drag family.

She currently owns the Miss Gay Texas pageant.

=== RuPaul's Drag Race ===
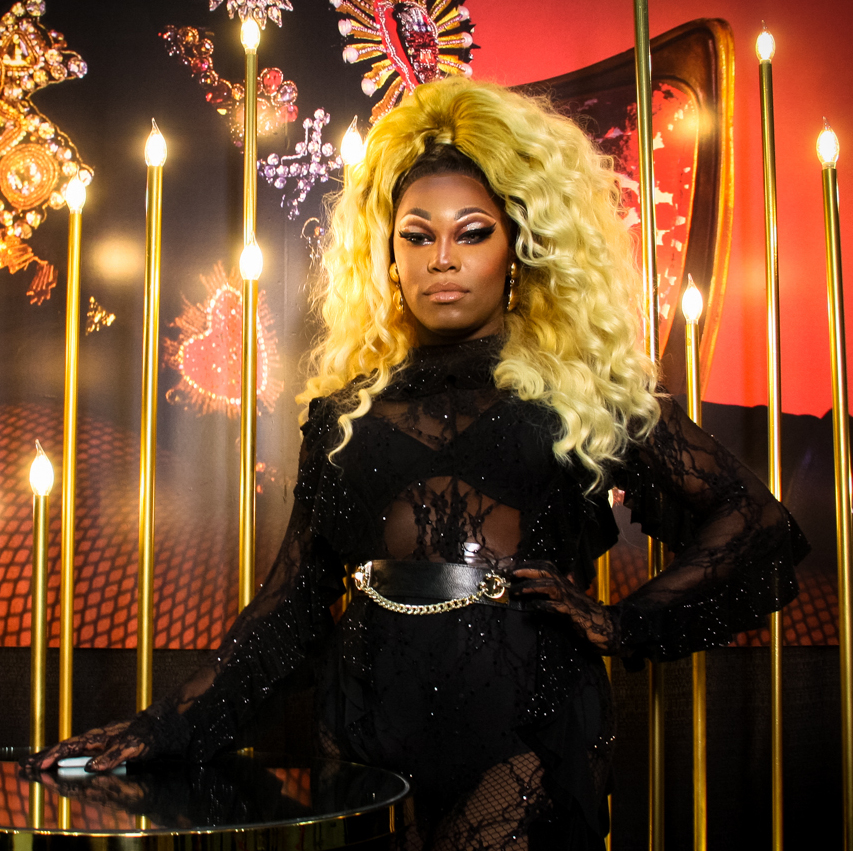
Asia O'Hara at RuPaul's DragCon LA in 2018

On February 22, 2018, O'Hara was presented as one of the 14 drag queens competing on Season 10 of RuPaul's Drag Race. She won two main challenges on the show and came in fourth place. In her finale performance, she is most notable for a failed attempt to release live butterflies from inside her costume, which received negative attention from animal welfare organizations such as PETA who condemned her actions as a 'Sad Spectacle'. Asia also received backlash from RuPaul and VH1 for her use of animals in the finale. In response to the backlash "O'Hara promised to donate over 100 volunteer hours to the ASPCA."

O'Hara was featured in RuPaul's Secret Celebrity Drag Race, a RuPaul's Drag Race spin-off, where she helped celebrities undergo a drag transformation.

=== Tours and hosting ===
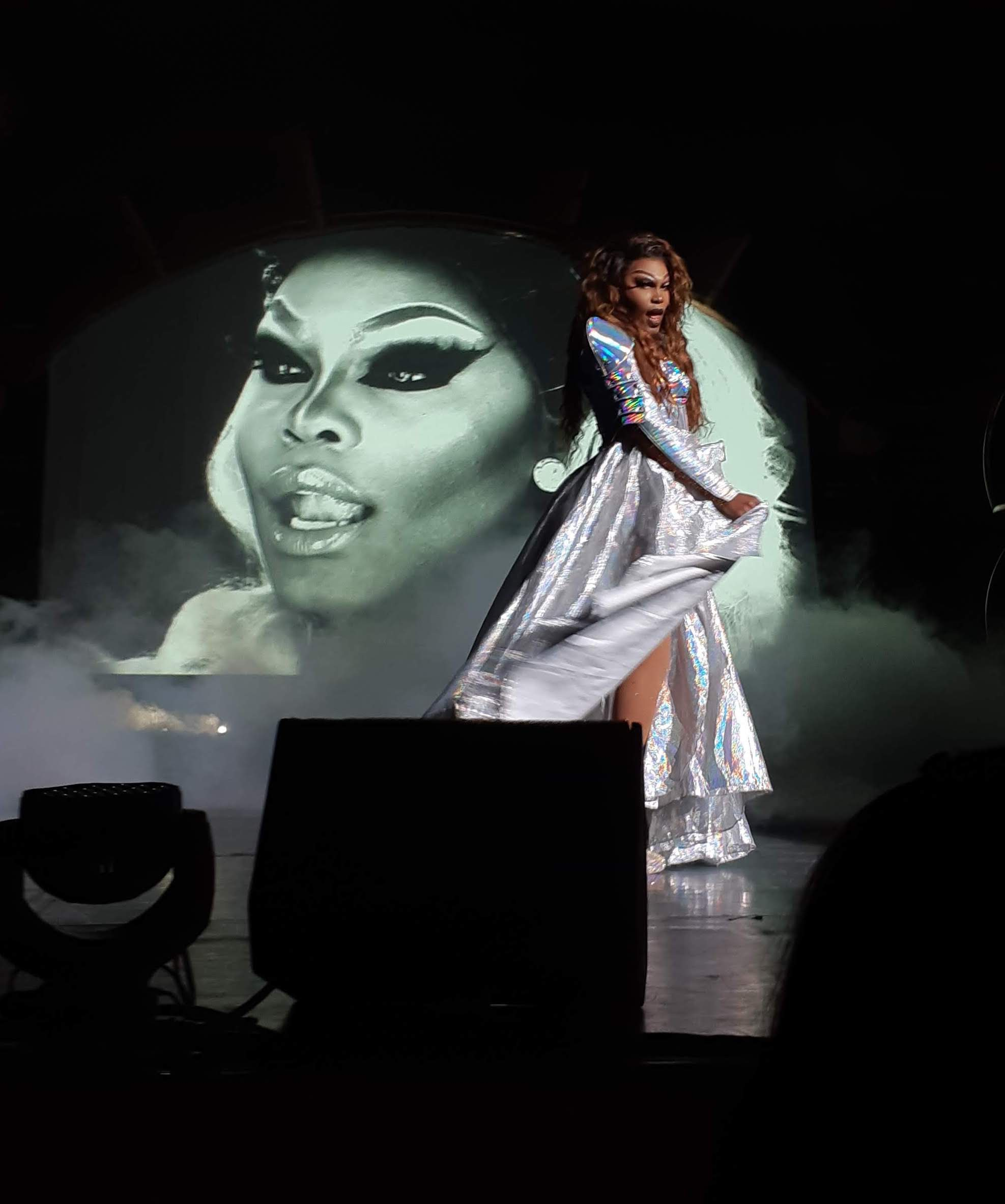
Asia O'Hara performing in Werq the World, 2019

In June 2018, O'Hara and other RuPaul's Drag Race alum Shea Coulee and Monét X Change performed in The Vixen's widely popular Black Girl Magic, a drag show created to showcase the talent of black drag queens. O'Hara was part of the Drag Race "Werq the World" tour in 2019. O'Hara hosted the red carpet for the RuPaul's Drag Race season eleven live finale. Later, from March 26 to September 6, she hosted the RuPaul's Drag Race: Season 11 Tour, presented by Voss Events and World of Wonder.

In September 2019, at RuPaul's DragCon NYC, O'Hara was named as one of a rotating cast of a dozen Drag Race queens in RuPaul's Drag Race Live!, a Las Vegas show residency from January to August 2020 at the Flamingo Las Vegas., and later co-starred in RuPaul's Drag Race: Vegas Revue, a miniseries about the live show. After closing down due to the COVID-19 pandemic, Asia O'Hara will return to the show in August, 2021.

On November 1, 2019, O'Hara announced her first self-produced one woman show, "Asia O'Hara's Electrique Christmas", set to show on December 21, 2019. In June 2020, O'Hara was announced as a cast member for Voss Events' Drive 'N Drag, a traveling summer drive-in tour created to accommodate the conditions of the COVID-19 pandemic.

=== Music ===
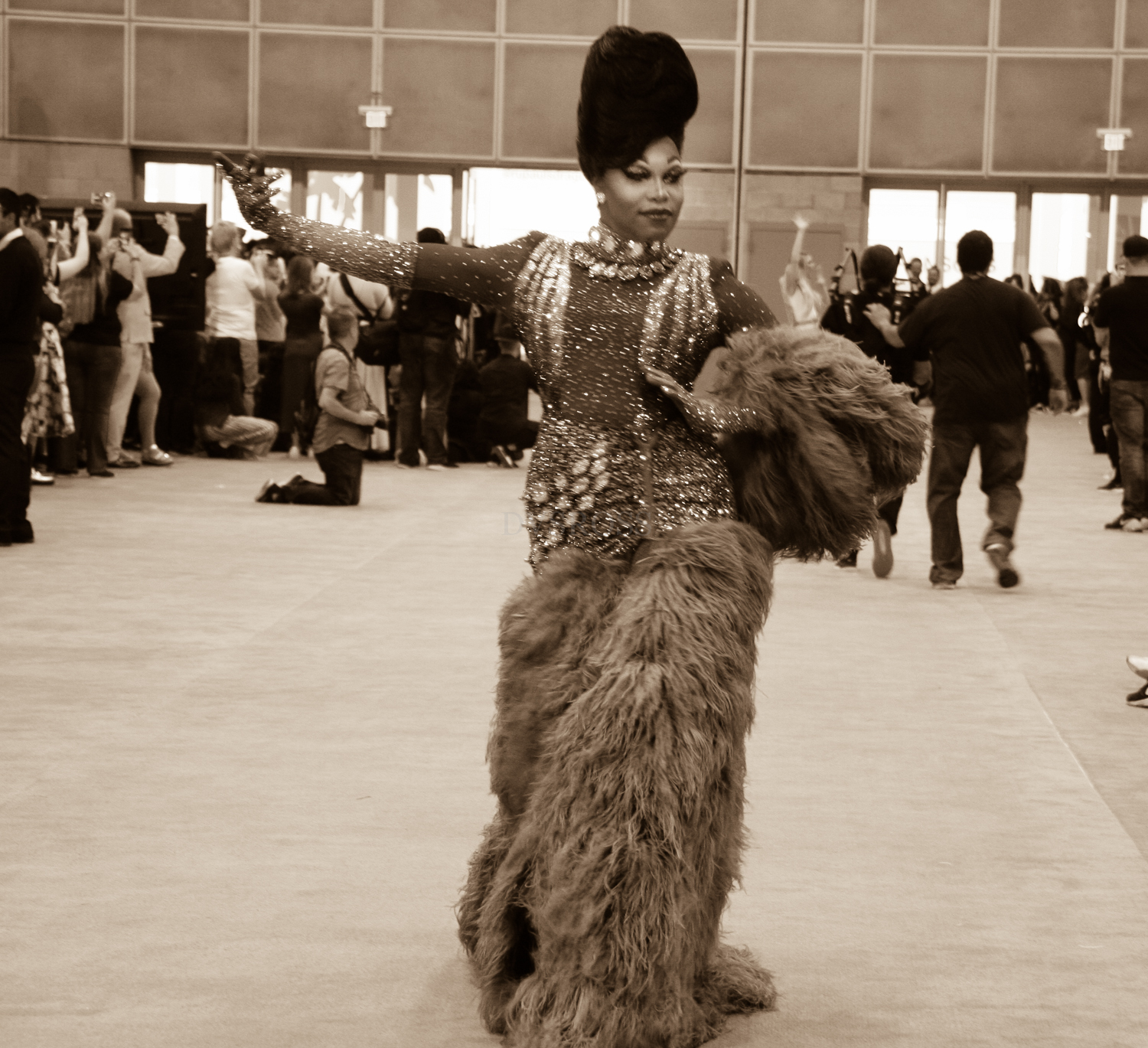
Asia O'Hara at RuPaul's DragCon LA in 2019

As part of her season's final challenge, O'Hara and the other top four contestants wrote and recorded their own verses for RuPaul's song "American". The song peaked at number 12 on the Billboard Dance/Electronic Songs chart. That same day, O'Hara released her first single, "Queen for Tonight" on June 15, 2018. Later that year, she recorded the track "Cause I'm Rich" on Christmas Queens 4, a compilation album featuring Christmas songs sung by former Drag Race contestants. Following the album's release, she embarked on the Christmas Queens tour of Europe in November and December 2018.

Her second single, "Crown Up", was released on May 20, 2019, along with an accompanying music video.

== Titles ==
- Miss Gay Texas America 2005, 1st alternate
- Miss Gay Texas USofA 2006, 1st alternate
- Miss Gay USofA 2006, 1st alternate
- Miss Gay Texas USofA 2007, 1st alternate
- Miss Gay USofA 2007, winner
- Miss Texas FFI 2010, winner
- Texas National Entertainer of the Year 2010, winner
- All American Goddess 2012, winner
- Miss Gay Briar Park America 2015, winner
- Miss Gay Texas America 2015 (prelim to Miss Gay America), winner
- Miss Gay America 2016, winner

== Personal life ==
Since appearing on RuPaul's Drag Race, Asia O'Hara became the subject of racist attacks over the internet.

== Discography ==
=== Singles ===
Year	Song
2018	"Queen for Tonight"
2019	"Crown Up"

=== As featured artist ===
Title	Year	Peak chart positions
Title	Year	US Dance Digital
"Cher: The Unauthorized Rusical" (RuPaul featuring the Cast of RuPaul's Drag Race, Season 10)	2018	—
"American" (RuPaul featuring Aquaria, Asia O'Hara, Eureka O'Hara & Kameron Michaels)	2018	12

== Filmography ==
=== Television ===
Year	Title	Role	Notes	Ref
2018	RuPaul's Drag Race	Herself	Contestant (4th place)	
2018	RuPaul's Drag Race: Untucked	Herself	Contestant (4th place)	
2020	RuPaul's Secret Celebrity Drag Race	Herself	Guest mentor	
2020	RuPaul's Drag Race: Vegas Revue	Herself	Main cast	
2023	RuPaul's Drag Race	Herself	Special guest; Episode: "Reunited!"	

=== Music Videos ===
Year	Title	Artist	Ref.
2019	Juice	Lizzo	
2019	Crown Up	Herself	
2020	Always	Waze & Odyssey	

=== Web series ===
Year	Title	Role	Notes	Ref
2018	Can Do Queens	Herself	Co-host (with Kameron Michaels)	
2018	Watcha Packin	Herself	Guest	
2018	Queen to Queen	Herself	Guest, with Kameron Michaels	
2018	Countdown to the Crown	Herself	Season 10	
2018	Fashion Photo RuView	Herself	Guest Co-host	
2019	How To Makeup	Herself	Guest	
2019	Toddy's World	Herself	Guest; S3 Ep3	
2020	Werq The World	Herself	Featured queen	
2020	10s Across The Board	Herself	Host	

== Awards and nominations ==
Year	Award Ceremony	Category	Work	Results	Ref.
2019	MTV Movie & TV Awards	Most Meme-able Moment	Asia O'Hara's Butterfly Finale Fail	Nominated	
2020	The Queerties	Future All-Star	Herself	Nominated	
