= RuPaul's Drag Race: Vegas Revue =

- Genre: Reality television
- Based on: RuPaul's Drag Race Live!
- Country of origin: United States
- Original language: English
- No. of seasons: 1
- No. of episodes: 6

Production
- Executive producers: RuPaul; Fenton Bailey; Randy Barbato; Tom Campbell; Danielle King; Tim Palazzola; Todd Radnitz
- Producer: Jen Passovoy
- Production company: World of Wonder

Original release
- Network: VH1
- Release: August 21 – September 25, 2020

Related
- RuPaul's Drag Race; RuPaul's Drag Race Live Untucked

RuPaul's Drag Race: Vegas Revue is a six-episode documentary series about RuPaul's Drag Race Live!, that premiered on VH1 on August 21, 2020. The premiere episode was dedicated to the memory of Chi Chi DeVayne, a former RuPaul's Drag Race and RuPaul's Drag Race All Stars contestant who died in August 2020.

== Cast ==
- Vanessa Vanjie Mateo
- Kameron Michaels
- Yvie Oddly
- Asia O'Hara
- Derrick Barry
- Naomi Smalls

== Episodes ==
No.	Title	Original release date
1	"Baby, We Made It!"	August 21, 2020
2	"Opening Night"	August 28, 2020
3	"The Weakest Link"	September 4, 2020
4	"Love Is in the Air"	September 11, 2020
5	"Family Affair"	September 18, 2020
6	"Leaving Las Vegas?"	September 25, 2020

== Ratings ==
Viewership and ratings per episode of RuPaul's Drag Race: Vegas Revue
No.	Title	Air date	Rating/share (18–49)	Viewers (millions)
1	"Baby, We Made It!"	August 21, 2020	0.11	0.253
2	"Opening Night"	August 28, 2020	0.05	0.220
3	"The Weakest Link"	September 4, 2020	0.05	0.166
4	"Live Is in the Air"	September 11, 2020	0.09	0.219
5	"Family Affair"	September 18, 2020	0.09	0.265
6	"Leaving Las Vegas?"	September 25, 2020	0.06	0.203
