= Drag Me to Dinner =

American television series

- Genre: Reality competition
- Presented by: Murray Hill
- Judges: Bianca Del Rio; David Burtka; Haneefah Wood; Neil Patrick Harris
- Country of origin: United States
- Original language: English
- No. of seasons: 1
- No. of episodes: 10

Production
- Executive producers: Chad Mumm; Chris Ying; Christopher C. Chen; David Burtka; David Chang; Dave O'Connor; James Sunderland; Jay Peterson; Mark W. Olsen; Neil Patrick Harris; Todd Lubin
- Producers: Paige Haaren; Michael Serrato
- Production companies: Vox Media Studios; Majordomo Media; Matador Content; Boat Rocker Media

Original release
- Network: Hulu
- Release: May 31, 2023

Drag Me to Dinner is an American reality competition television series hosted by New York City drag legend Murray Hill, with judges Bianca Del Rio, David Burtka, Neil Patrick Harris, and Haneefah Wood. The series was released May 31, 2023 on Hulu.

== Format ==
Drag artists from across United States pair into teams to compete for The Glorious Golden Grater. Each episode has a broad theme, and teams have 90 minutes to prepare to host a theme party. Party presentations are judged in three categories: food & drink, design & décor, and entertainment & overall vibe. Each team benefits from Handy Helpers during the competition. Winners of a trivia question receive advice from resident chef David Burtka, while the other team receives "help" from Burtka's "aunt," Sue Chef.

== Season 1 ==
Episode	Queens			Theme	Winners
1	BenDeLaCreme; Jinkx Monsoon (Ship Wrecked)	vs.	Jackie Beat; Sherry Vine (Cougars Goes Coconuts)	Tropical Kiki	BenDeLaCreme; Jinkx Monsoon (Ship Wrecked)
2	BeBe Zahara Benet; Trinity the Tuck (Whore Done It?)	vs.	Kiki Ball-Change; Thorgy Thor (All You Can Eat – Illegal Brothel)	Whoring '20s	Kiki Ball-Change; Thorgy Thor (All You Can Eat – Illegal Brothel)
3	Alexis Mateo; Vanessa Vanjie Mateo (My Baby Did A Hanky Panky)	vs.	Marti Gould Cummings; Peachez Iman Cummings (Miss Mistake USA)	Baby Shower	Marti Gould Cummings; Peachez Iman Cummings (Miss Mistake USA)
4	Detox; Raja (Black Tie Toga: A Fundraiser)	vs.	Mayhem Miller; Morgan McMichaels (Oh My Goddess: Let's Party!)	Toga Party	Detox; Raja (Black Tie Toga: A Fundraiser)
5	Alaska; Willam (Ex-Communicated)	vs.	Latrice Royale; Manila Luzon (The Better Half)	Divorce Party	Alaska; Willam (Ex-Communicated)
6	Ginger Minj; Nina West (60s Pixies)	vs.	Darienne Lake; Mrs. Kasha Davis (80s Ladies)	Tupperware Party	Ginger Minj; Nina West (60s Pixies)
7	Gigi Goode; Symone (Malibu Bar-Bae-Q)	vs.	Jasmine Rice LaBeija; Rhea Litré (Queens in Space)	Beach Blanket Bing-Ho	Gigi Goode; Symone (Malibu Bar-Bae-Q)
8	Kim Chi; Naomi Smalls (Queens in Wonderland)	vs.	Heidi N Closet; Jaida Essence Hall (Camp Tramps)	Slumber Party	Heidi N Closet; Jaida Essence Hall (Camp Tramps)
9	Chelsea Piers; Selma Nilla (Take Me Out to the Broad-Game)	vs.	Merrie Cherry; Pixie Aventura (It's Super Hoe Sunday)	Tailgate Weiner Roast	Merrie Cherry; Pixie Aventura (It's Super Hoe Sunday)
10	Biqtch Puddin'; Meatball (Hot Food, Hotter Carnies)	vs.	Heklina; Peaches Christ (Magic Freak Show)	Big Bottom, Big Top	Biqtch Puddin'; Meatball (Hot Food, Hotter Carnies)

== Episodes ==
No.	Title	Original release date
1	"Tropical Kiki"	May 31, 2023
2	"Whoring 20s"	May 31, 2023
3	"Baby Shower"	May 31, 2023
4	"Toga Party"	May 31, 2023
5	"Divorce Party"	May 31, 2023
6	"Tupperware Party"	May 31, 2023
7	"Beach Blanket Bing-Ho"	May 31, 2023
8	"Slumber Party"	May 31, 2023
9	"Tailgate Weiner Roast"	May 31, 2023
10	"Big Bottom, Big Top"	May 31, 2023

== Release ==
Drag Me to Dinner premiered on Hulu on May 31, 2023. It was released on Disney+ in other territories on July 26, 2023.

== Reception ==
=== Critical response ===
The review aggregator website Rotten Tomatoes reported a 60% approval rating with an average rating of 3.70/10, based on 5 critic reviews.

Kevin Fallon of The Daily Beast called Drag Me to Dinner the "perfect idea" of what a Pride Month program should embody, saying it highlights important characteristics of the month of celebrating LGBTQ culture, saying, it exemples the "permission to be absolutely ridiculous, joke around with your community, and celebrate the fun of LGBT+ culture." Ty'Kira Smalls of Common Sense Media gave Drag Me to Dinner a grade of three out of five stars, calling the show entertaining and noting the diversity of the contestants.

=== Accolades ===
Drag Me to Dinner was nominated for Reality/Docuseries at the 2024 Queerty Awards.

== See also ==
- List of Hulu original programming
