= Kameron Michaels =

American drag queen (born 1986)

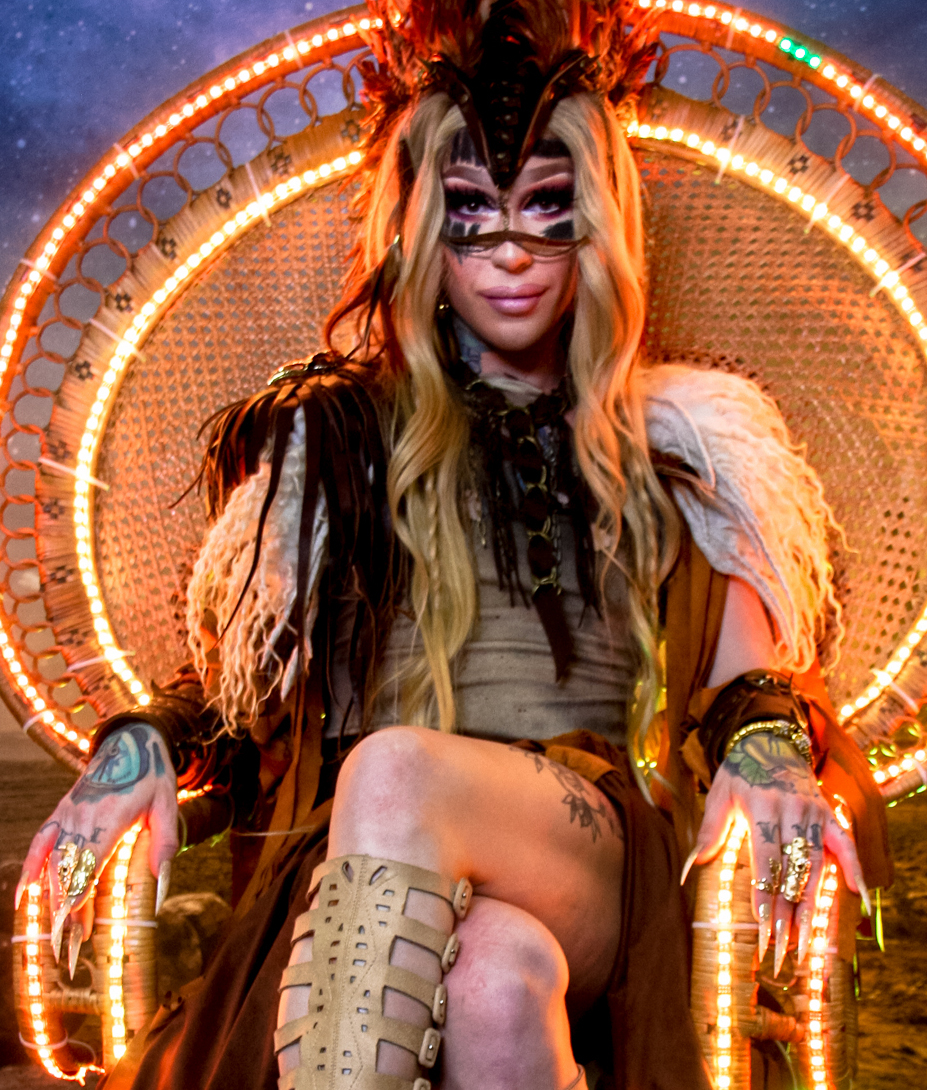
- Kameron Michaels at RuPaul's DragCon LA, 2019
- Born: Dane Young; July 23, 1986 (age 40); Massillon, Ohio, U.S.
- Other names: The Bodybuilder Barbie; Arianna St. Claire
- Occupation: Drag queen
- Years active: 2004 or 2005 – present
- Known for: RuPaul's Drag Race (season 10); Werq the World; RuPaul's Drag Race Live!; RuPaul's Drag Race: Vegas Revue
- Website: kameronmichaels.com

Dane Young (born July 23, 1986), known professionally as Kameron Michaels, is an American drag performer who came to international attention after competing on the tenth season of RuPaul's Drag Race. Originally from Columbia, Tennessee, she began her career in Nashville, where she performed locally from 2004 or 2005 until her appearance on television. Since her season aired in 2018, Michaels has been a staple of several domestic and international tours that feature Drag Race contestants, including Werq the World, Christmas Queens and Drive 'N Drag. She has also appeared on a number of web series produced by World of Wonder. In June 2019, she released "Freedom", her debut single and music video. Since January 2020, she has been a staple cast member of RuPaul's Drag Race Live!, a residency show in Las Vegas, and also stars in the accompanying VH1 miniseries RuPaul's Drag Race: Vegas Revue.

Michaels identifies as a muscle queen, that is, a drag queen whose aesthetic embraces a built, muscular body. Because of her physique, she is known by the nickname "The Bodybuilder Barbie". She is also noted for her tattoos, which cover her forearms, her chest and part of a leg.

== Early life ==
Young was born on July 23, 1986, his parents' only child. They lived in Massillon, Ohio, until he was five years old. After this, they briefly resided in Michigan before moving to Columbia, Tennessee, where Young spent the majority of his youth. He realized he was gay in his early teens, and he came out to his mother at age 14. She reacted supportively. In high school, he was bullied for his sexuality and body language, and he developed introverted tendencies in response to this. He studied photographs and videos of himself to identify effeminate gestures that he then learned to modify or avoid.

When he was 18, Young began traveling to Nashville on the weekends, and he took up work as a go-go dancer and cocktail server on the local scene. It was there that he first came into contact with drag queens and subsequently began performing in drag. Because he felt more at home in Nashville's queer community than in the conservative environment of Columbia, he relocated to Nashville when he was 21.

== Career ==
=== Beginnings and style ===
I always say that my drag is a mix of old-school and new drag. I grew up around old-school drag—fringe costumes and dance. Dancing is a big thing for me.... I am definitely influenced by that, [but I also] take part in crazy makeup sometimes and newer songs. I don't do a whole lot of old-school stuff besides my costumes.

— Michaels, in an interview with Dallas Voice

At the start of Young's drag career, a more seasoned performer made his costumes, but he taught himself how to use makeup. He initially took the drag name Arianna St. Claire. After a few months, he switched the name to Kameron Michaels, as he wanted an androgynous first name paired with a last name used by no other drag queen in Nashville.

Young took inspiration for his aesthetic from cinema and video games, and he describes his drag style as hyper-feminine. He credits the Southern variety of drag he learned in Nashville with making him well-rounded, stating that it equipped him with diverse skills such as dancing and costume-making. After developing a gym habit in his mid-20s, he became known as a muscle queen due to his built physique. Before appearing on RuPaul's Drag Race, Young worked full time as a hair stylist, doing drag only on weekends. He performed regularly at Play Dance Bar in Nashville.

=== RuPaul's Drag Race ===
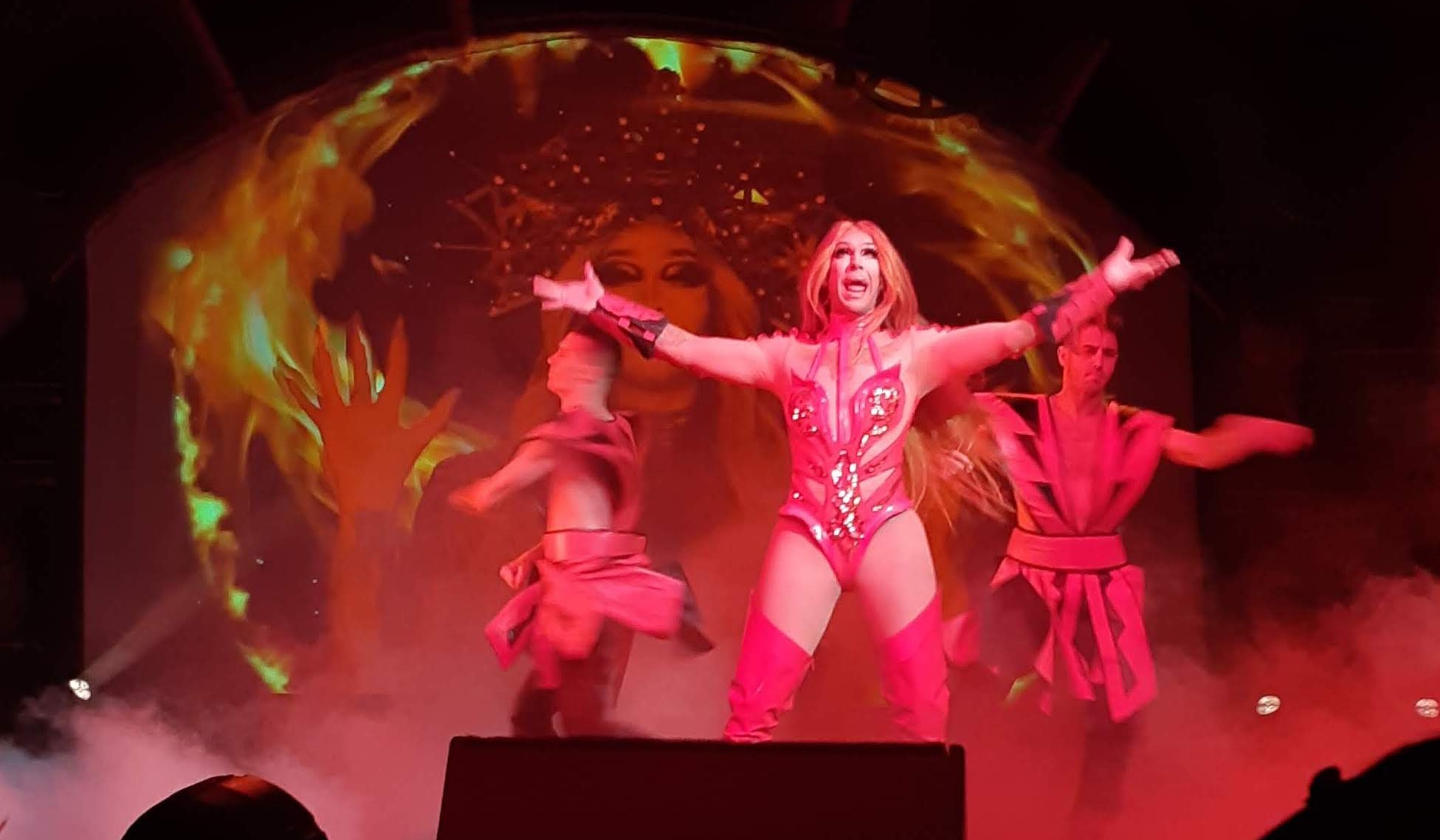
Kameron Michaels (center) performing at Werq the World in 2019

Michaels auditioned for the seventh season of Drag Race in 2014, but she did not receive a callback. She then auditioned for the tenth season in an effort to overcome a difficult breakup. On her audition tape, she highlighted that, as a muscle queen, she was a type of character the show had never seen before. She was selected to participate, and her season aired in 2018. She finished as a runner-up, together with Eureka O'Hara, behind winner Aquaria.

Some media outlets and fellow contestants dubbed Michaels the season's lip sync assassin, as she lip-synced for her life four times in a row without being sent home; no other contestant has survived more than three lip syncs. She also won the finale's first Lip Sync for the Crown but lost the second one to Aquaria, bringing her lip sync total to six. On the show, she was noted for her introversion, which set her apart from her competitors. Following criticism she received in the season's reunion episode for appearing more extroverted on social media than in person, Michaels learned about ambiversion. She has stated that this description fits her well.

In August 2021, Michaels appeared on the ninth episode of the sixth season of RuPaul's Drag Race All Stars. Serving as the episode's Lip Sync Assassin, she lip synced against the week's top competitor, Ra'Jah O'Hara, and was declared the winner.

=== Music and tours ===
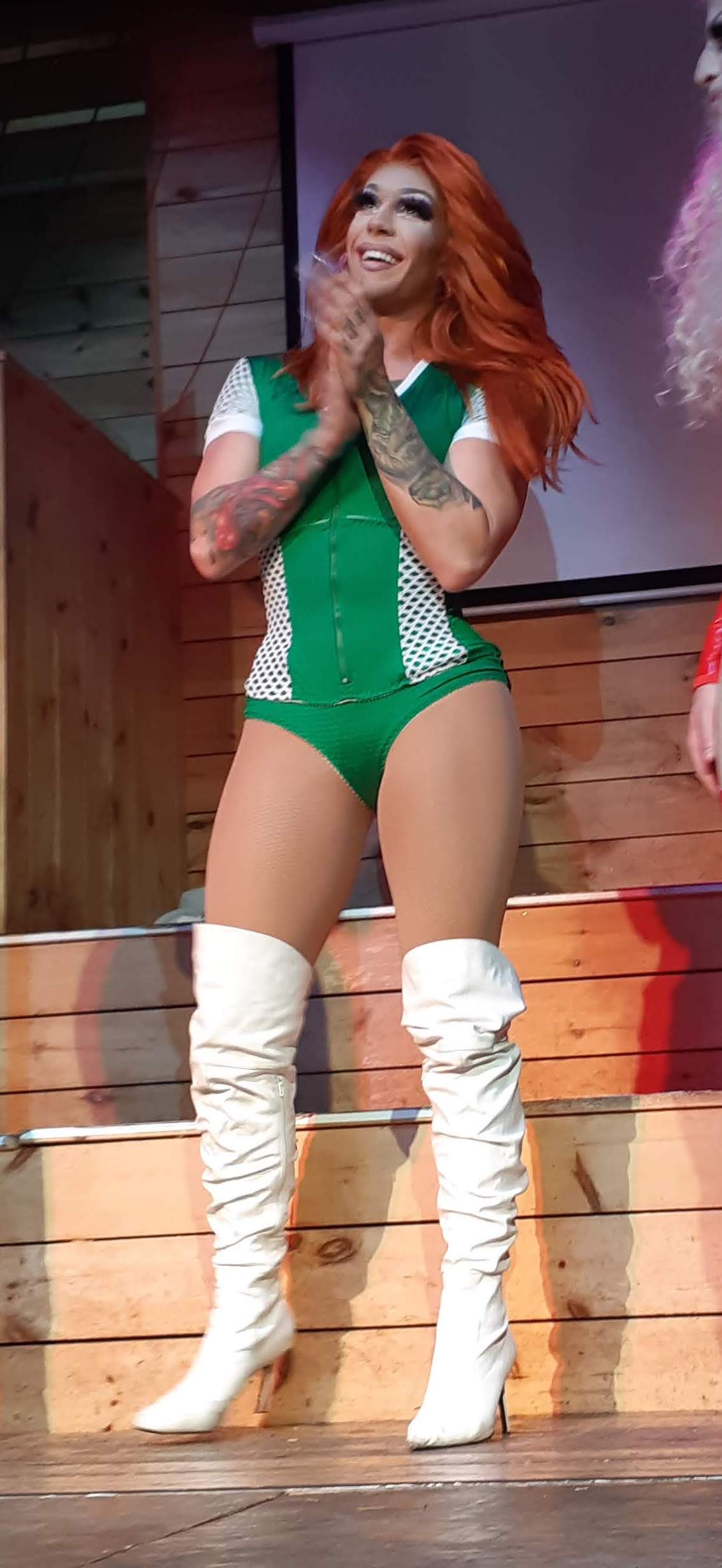
Michaels on tour in 2018

As part of season 10's final challenge, Michaels and the other top four contestants wrote and recorded their own verses for RuPaul's song "American". The song reached number 12 on the Billboard Dance/Electronic Songs chart. In summer 2018, Michaels participated in the 10s Across the Board Tour, traveling around the U.S. with other queens from the season. Later that year, she recorded the track "Let It Snow" on Christmas Queens 4, a compilation album featuring Christmas songs sung by former Drag Race contestants. Following the album's release, she embarked on the Christmas Queens tour of Europe in November and December 2018. She then returned to Europe for a solo tour in January 2019. The following month, she released a lip sync music video in which she performs Mark Ronson's "Nothing Breaks Like a Heart". In June of that year, she released her debut single, "Freedom", and its corresponding music video.

Since the second half of 2018, Michaels has traveled around the Americas, Asia, Australia and Europe for several legs of Werq the World, and she appears in a docuseries about that tour. From January 2020, Michaels has been a staple of RuPaul's Drag Race Live!, a residency show in Las Vegas. The show went on hiatus for much of the COVID-19 pandemic, but Michaels was still on the cast when it resumed in August 2021. She also co-stars in RuPaul's Drag Race: Vegas Revue, a VH1 miniseries about the live show. In May 2020, Michaels participated in a live-streamed version of Werq the World to raise money for drag entertainers out of work due to the pandemic. Since July 2020, Michaels has been on tour with Drive 'N Drag, a drive-in drag show held outdoors to accommodate social distancing restrictions imposed due to COVID-19.

== Personal life ==
Young is gay. He began visiting the gym with a boyfriend who pressured him to stop doing drag. After they broke up, he continued to focus on building muscle and returned to the drag scene, where his body drew criticism from others in the industry. In the months that followed the airing of Drag Race season 10, his workout routine temporarily fell by the wayside as he adjusted to life on tour. Young briefly dated fellow season 10 contestant Vanessa Vanjie Mateo while filming RuPaul's Drag Race: Vegas Revue.

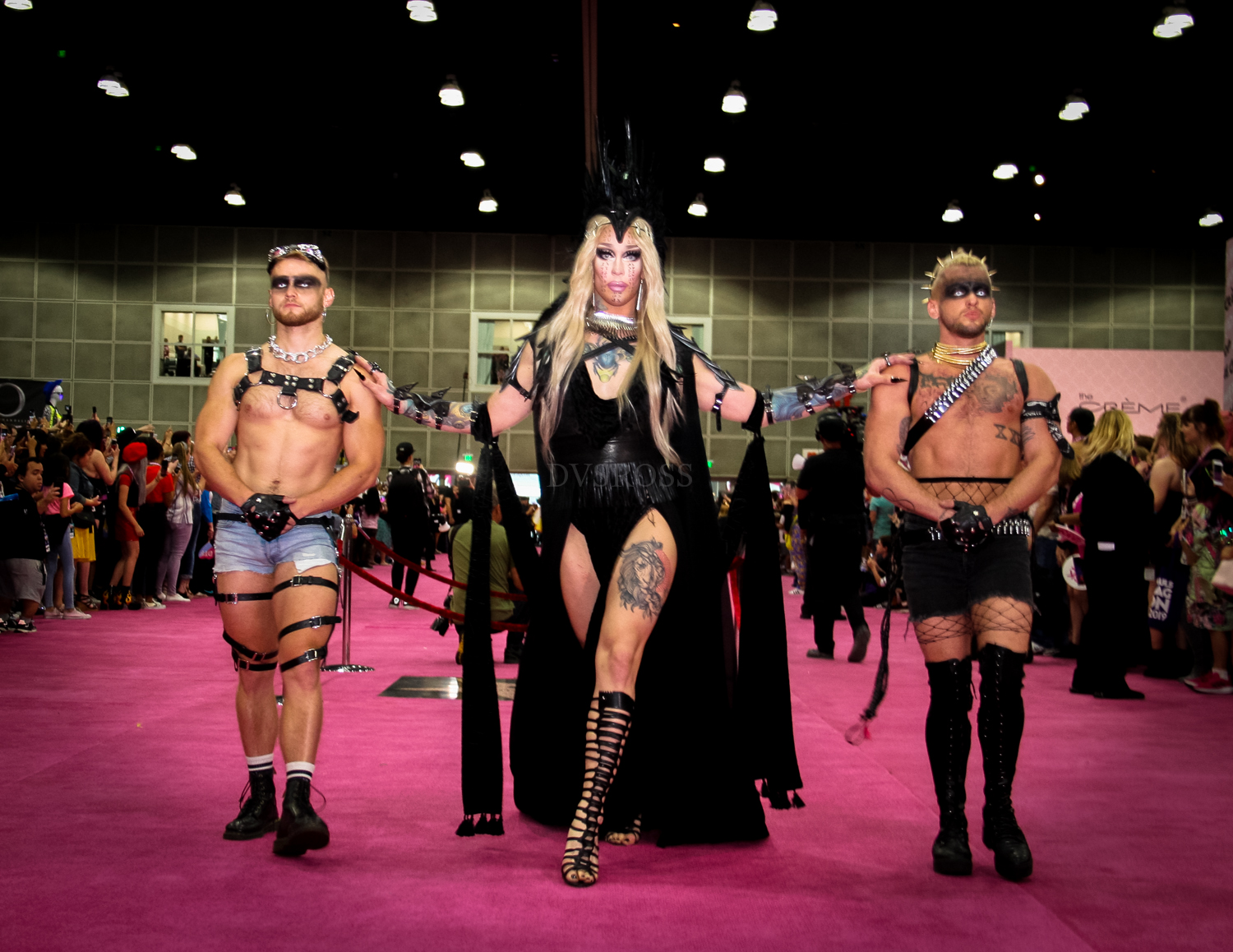
Kameron Michaels (center) at RuPaul's DragCon LA in 2019

Young's arms and hands, as well as his chest, neck and left leg, bear tattoos that are visible when he is both in and out of drag. When asked about them in an interview, he said, "I started getting tattooed when I was around 26 or 27. All my tattoos are by the same artist, and they were all done in about a year and a half. [They depict] favorite movies from my childhood and sentimental things in my life." His left arm contains imagery from Jurassic Park and Aliens, and he has a scarab beetle across his chest. Of the latter, he said, "I got that when I started working out and going to the gym, because the scarab represents kind of a rebirth. That was me finding out who I was meant to be and really doing things for myself ... taking time for myself."

In July 2020, Young deleted much of the content from his Kameron Michaels profiles on Instagram, Twitter and YouTube, coincidentally on the day that RuPaul did the same; this generated discussion and speculation among Drag Race fans and followers. Young later stated that he had removed the posts during a period of mental distress, which he attributed to prolonged time spent home alone due to the COVID-19 pandemic and to reflection about the ongoing George Floyd protests. He subsequently restored some of the content. In July 2021, Young shared on social media that he had suffered a severe bout of depression in November 2020, stating:

I barely ate. Barely took in liquids. By the time I pulled myself out of the hole I was in, my kidneys were dry, and most of the hair all over my body had thinned or fallen out.... I picked up my phone one random day and documented this to remember later what had happened to me.... It still makes me uneasy, but even if one person sees this and knows they aren't alone then I'm happy that I finally chose to post about it.

As of June 2021, Young resided in Los Angeles. The following month, he purchased a home in Las Vegas and moved there with his French Bulldog, Lilo.

While starring in RuPaul's Drag Race Live!, Young dated fellow cast member André Hurtado, who died in December 2022. Young subsequently went on hiatus from social media for 10 months, until October 2023. When he resumed posting on TikTok, he published a reel sharing that he had been diagnosed with ADHD. Around the same time, he shared on Instagram that he was in a relationship.

In early 2025, Young announced that he had become a certified personal trainer and launched a workout program called Kameron Michaels Fitness. Additionally, he launched an OnlyFans page.

== Discography ==
=== Singles ===
==== As lead artist ====
Title	Year	Album	Ref(s)
"Let It Snow"	2018	Christmas Queens 4	
"Freedom"	2019	Non-album single	

==== As featured artist ====
Title	Year	Album	Ref
"American" (RuPaul feat. Aquaria, Kameron Michaels, Eureka O'Hara and Asia O'Hara)	2018	Non-album single	

== Filmography ==
=== Television ===
Year	Title	Role	Ref(s)
2018	RuPaul's Drag Race (season 10)	Contestant (runner-up)	
2018	RuPaul's Drag Race: Untucked (season 10)	Herself	
2020	RuPaul's Drag Race: Vegas Revue	Herself	
2021	RuPaul's Drag Race All Stars (season 6)	Lip Sync Assassin (one episode)	

=== Internet series ===
Year	Title	Role	Producer	Notes	Ref(s)
2018	Whatcha Packin'	Guest	VH1		
2018	Gaymer Guys	Guest host	World of Wonder		
2018	Fashion Photo RuView	Guest host	World of Wonder		
2018	Hey Qween!	Guest	Jonny McGovern		
2018	How to Makeup	Herself	World of Wonder		
2018	Bestie$ for Ca$h	Herself	World of Wonder	With Eureka O'Hara	
2018–present	Can Do Queens	Co-host	World of Wonder	With Asia O'Hara	
2020	Working Out Is a Drag	Featured guest	World of Wonder		
2020	Werq the World	Herself	World of Wonder		
2021	Out of the Closet	Featured guest	VH1		
2021–present	Gay Sex Ed	Co-host	World of Wonder	With Vanessa Vanjie Mateo	

=== Music videos ===
Year	Title	Notes	Ref
2019	"Nothing Breaks Like a Heart" (Mark Ronson feat. Miley Cyrus)	Lip sync video	
2019	"Freedom"		
2022	"The Motto" (Tiësto & Ava Max)	Cameo appearance	
