= Naomi Smalls =

American drag queen

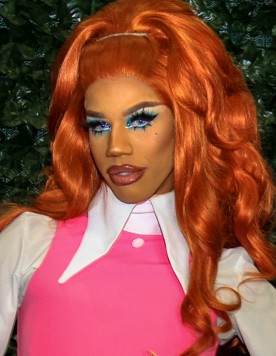
- Smalls at RuPaul's DragCon LA in 2018
- Born: Davis M. Heppenstall; September 8, 1993 (age 32); Fresno, California, U.S.
- Occupations: Drag performer; model
- Television: RuPaul's Drag Race (2016); RuPaul's Drag Race: All Stars (2018)
- Height: 1.91 m (6 ft 3 in)
- Website: naomismallsduh.com

Naomi Smalls is the stage name of Davis Heppenstall (born September 8, 1993), an American drag queen and reality television personality, best known as one of the runners-up on the eighth season of RuPaul's Drag Race as well as RuPaul's Drag Race All Stars season 4.

== Early life ==
Heppenstall was born on September 8, 1993, in Fresno, California, and was later adopted in Redlands. He has eight brothers and three sisters, many of whom were also adopted. His adopted mom is named June. Smalls has described her mother as her "biggest fan".

== Career ==
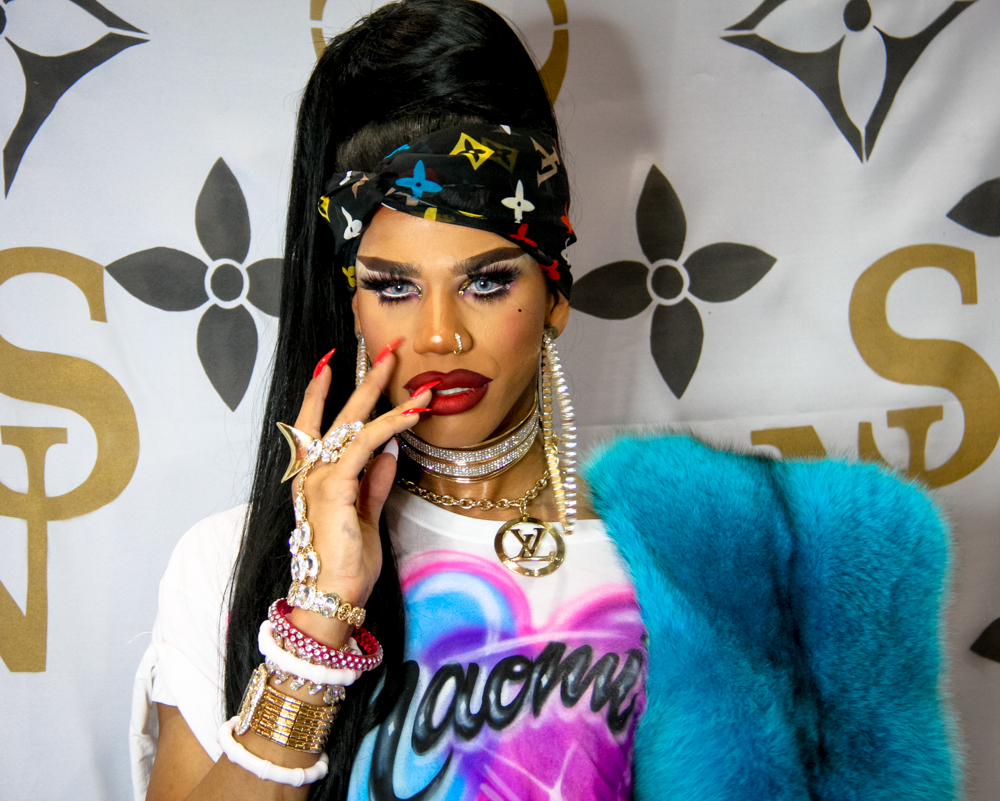
Naomi Smalls in 2017

The name Naomi Smalls comes from supermodel Naomi Campbell and rapper Biggie Smalls.

=== RuPaul's Drag Race ===
Smalls was announced as one of twelve contestants for the eighth season of RuPaul's Drag Race on February 1, 2016. At 21 years old, she was the season's youngest contestant. Smalls was in the bottom two in the fifth episode after she played Tiffany Pollard for the annual "Snatch Game" competition. She lip synced to "Causing a Commotion" by Madonna against Acid Betty and won, saving herself from elimination. She won the makeover challenge the following episode, where she designed an outfit for one of the Little Women: LA cast members. She reached the final three in the season, but lost to Bob the Drag Queen, and tied with Kim Chi for runner-up.

On November 8, 2018, it was announced that Smalls would be returning to compete in the fourth season of RuPaul's Drag Race All Stars. Smalls placed high for the first four episodes, doing incredibly well but just shy of winning. She was in the bottom for the roast of Lady Bunny in episode five but won against Gia Gunn in a Lipsync in the episode six "LaLaPaRuZa" to keep her place. She was in the bottom the following episode, but was saved by Latrice Royale. She won the makeover challenge, becoming the first ever queen to win two makeover challenges, and the only one to only win the makeover challenge on each of her seasons, but she controversially eliminated front-runner Manila Luzon from the competition after Luzon had been the only queen that season to never previously land in the bottom two. Smalls reached the final, and finished as the Runner up with Monique Heart. She became the first Drag Race contestant to finish as Runner up to both of her seasons since Raven.

=== After Drag Race ===
Outside of Drag Race, Smalls was a co-host with Kim Chi for the WoWPresents internet series M.U.G. where they critique queens makeup looks. She makes recurring appearances on the internet series "Fashion Photo RuView" filling in for Raja or Raven. Smalls did an interview with Cardi B for Cosmopolitan in February 2018. She started her own YouTube series, Small's World, where she documents her life touring across the country. The first episode premiered on February 16, 2018.

In September 2019, at RuPaul's DragCon NYC, Smalls was named as one of a rotating cast of a dozen Drag Race queens in RuPaul's Drag Race Live!, a Las Vegas show residency at the Flamingo Las Vegas. In 2024, she was announced as one of eight former Drag Race contestants participating in Painting with Raven, a spin-off of the WOW Presents Plus series Painted with Raven.

Smalls released a music video for her first single, "Pose", on December 16, 2018. She also appeared in Manila Luzon's music video for "Go Fish".

== Filmography ==
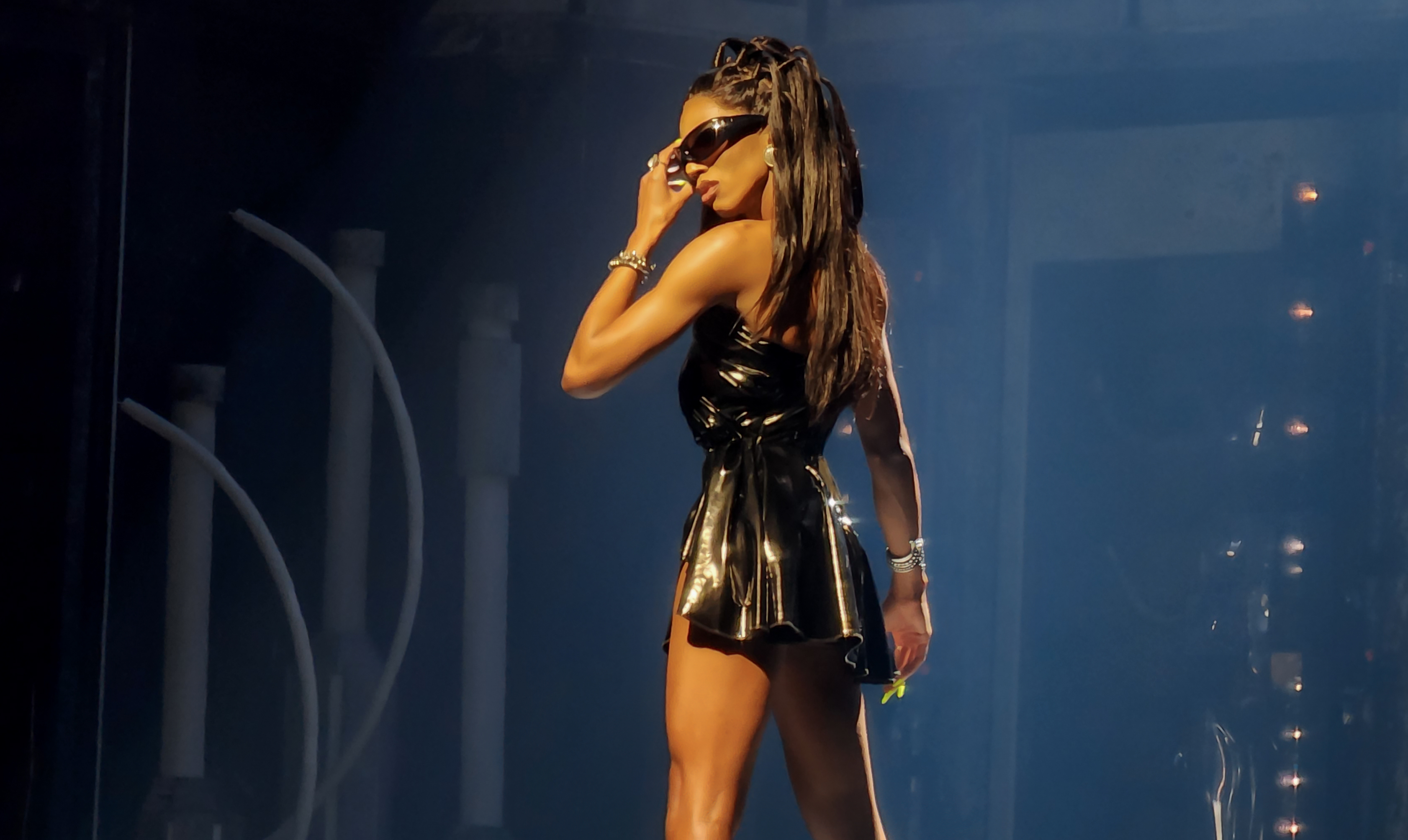
Smalls during the Werq the World Tour (2023)

=== Film ===
Year	Title	Role	Notes
2018	A Queen for the People	Herself	Documentary by Bob the Drag Queen

=== Television ===
Year	Title	Role	Notes
2016	RuPaul's Drag Race	Herself	Contestant (Runner-Up)
2016	RuPaul's Drag Race: Untucked	Herself	Contestant (Runner-Up)
2016–2017	Gay for Play Game Show Starring RuPaul	Herself	Guest
2018–2019	RuPaul's Drag Race All Stars	Herself	Contestant (3rd/4th Place)
2020	RuPaul's Drag Race: Vegas Revue	Herself	
2023	Drag Me to Dinner	Herself	Hulu original

=== Music videos ===
Year	Title	Artist
2018	Pose	Herself
2019	Go Fish	Manila Luzon

=== Web series ===
Year	Title	Role	Notes	Ref.
2016	RuPaul's Drag Race: Untucked	Herself	Season 8	
2017	Fashion Photo RuView	Herself	Guest Host	
2017-18	M.U.G.	Herself	Co-Host	
2017	Cosmo Queens	Herself	Guest by Cosmopolitan	
2018	Small's World	Herself	Host	
2018	Sibling Rivalry	Herself	Guest, Episode 10	
2018	Call Me Coulee	Herself	Cameo	
2019	Whatcha Packin'	Herself	Guest	
2019	Runway Rewind	Herself	Guest, hosted by Violet Chachki	
2020	Werq The World	Herself	Featured Queen	
2021	Binge	Herself	Podcast by Entertainment Weekly	
2021	Beauty Secrets	Herself	Guest by Vogue	
2022-23	The Pit Stop	Herself	Guest	
2023	Sloppy Seconds	Herself	Podcast; Episode: "#318"	
2024	Monét's Slumber Party	Herself	Guest	
2024	The Bald and the Beautiful	Herself	Podcast; Episode: "Queen of the Amazons with Naomi Smalls and Katya"	

== Discography ==
=== Singles ===
==== As lead artist ====
Year	Title
2019	"Pose"

==== Featured singles ====
Title	Year	Album
"Errybody Say Love" (RuPaul featuring Naomi Smalls, Monique Heart, Farrah Moan, and Monét X Change)	2018	non-album single
"Super Queen" (RuPaul featuring Naomi Smalls, Monét X Change, Monique Heart, & Trinity the Tuck)	2019	non-album single
