= Aquaria (drag queen) =

American drag queen

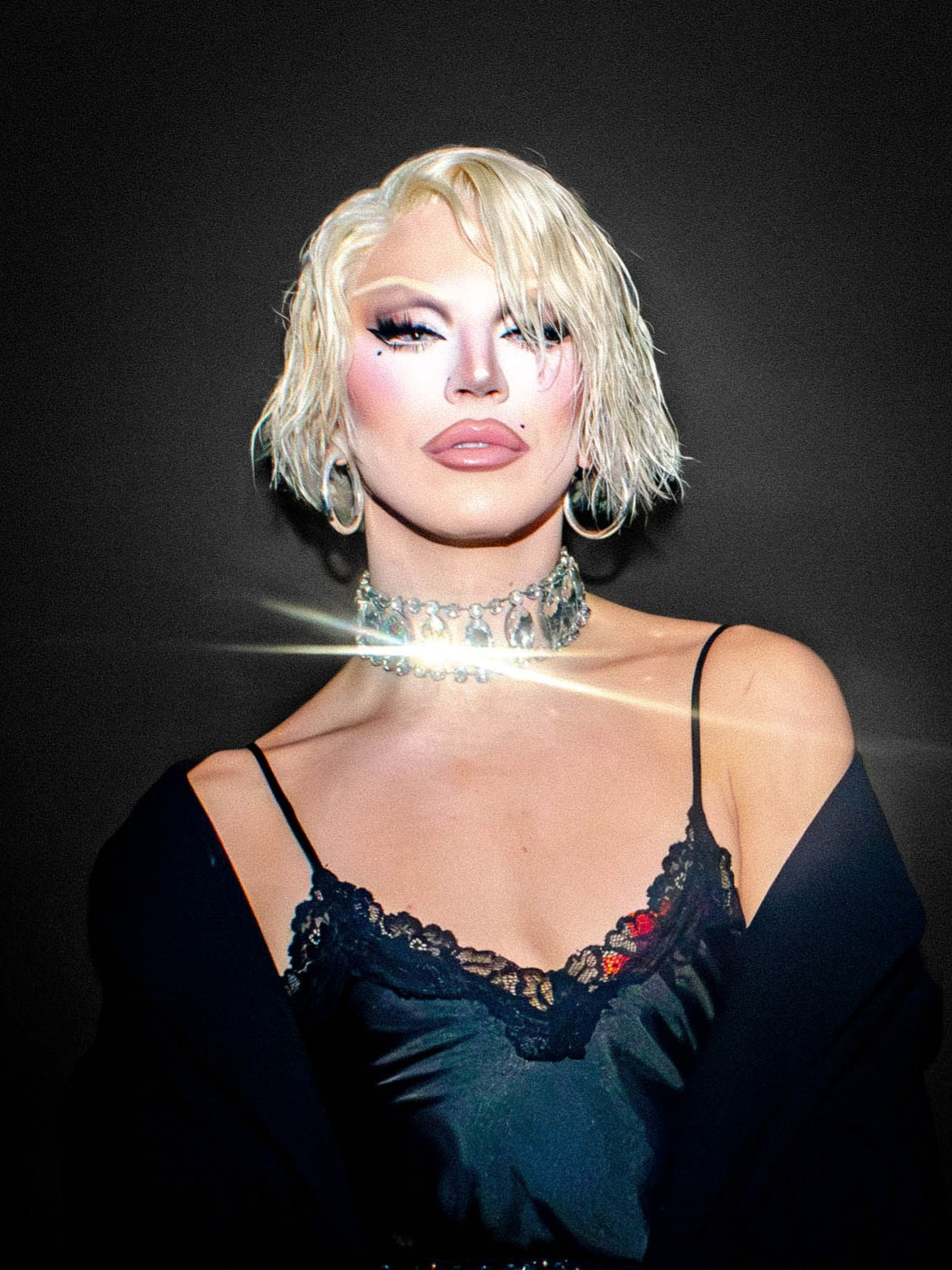
- Aquaria at Bimbo Montréal 2026
- Born: Giovanni Lucca Palandrani; February 12, 1996 (age 30); West Chester, Pennsylvania, U.S.
- Education: Fashion Institute of Technology
- Occupations: Drag queen, television personality, recording artist
- Years active: 2014–present
- Known for: RuPaul's Drag Race (season 10) winner
- Website: ageofaquaria.com

Giovanni Lucca Palandrani (born February 12, 1996), better known by his stage name Aquaria, is an American drag queen, television personality, and recording artist best known for winning the tenth season of RuPaul's Drag Race in 2018.

== Early life and education ==
Palandrani was born in West Chester, Pennsylvania to Gina and David Palandrani. Palandrani was raised Catholic and is of Italian descent. He has a sister named Francesca. He trained as a dancer for four years and experimented with drag in high school. He studied women's wear design at the Fashion Institute of Technology in Manhattan for two semesters, before dropping out.

== Career ==
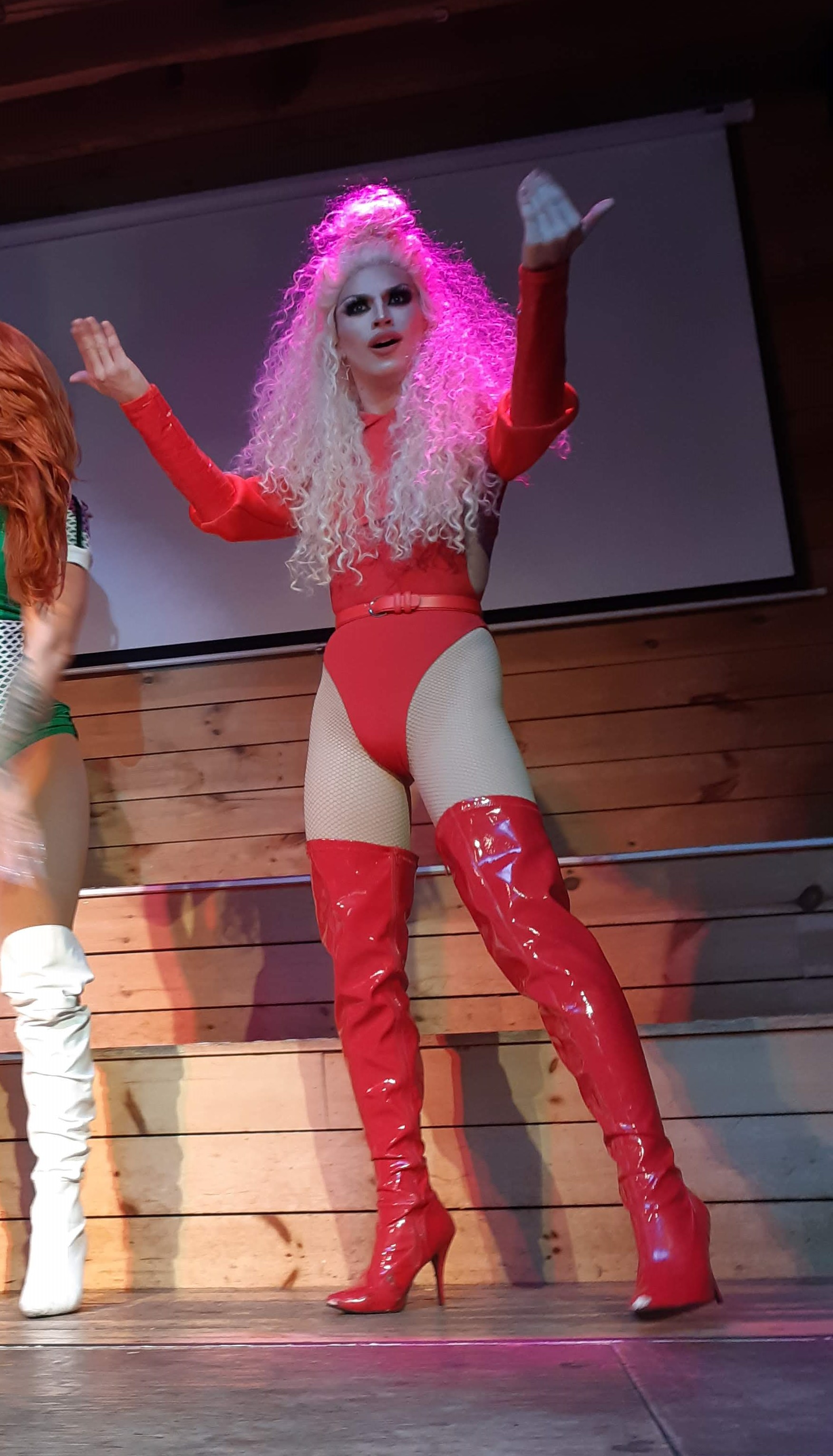
Aquaria in 2018

Aquaria was the drag daughter of Drag Race season four winner Sharon Needles. However, after accusations of abuse were made against Needles in 2020, Aquaria has said that she "does not support him" and "feels awful for anyone he has hurt". She began performing in drag in 2014. Like RuPaul, Aquaria received early support from Susanne Bartsch. Aquaria was featured in a Vogue Italia spread in January 2016 with Bartsch and other Drag Race alumnae.

In early 2018, it was announced that Aquaria was chosen as one of fourteen contestants for the tenth season of RuPaul's Drag Race, upon her first audition for the program. She won three main challenges, never ranked in the bottom two, and was the first queen in the show's history to win both the ball and the "Snatch Game" in the same season. Aquaria was announced as the winner of the season on June 28, 2018, beating out Eureka O'Hara and Kameron Michaels in the final three.

Aquaria was nominated with Miz Cracker for the "Competition Contestant of 2018" for the 2018 People's Choice Awards.

In October 2018, Aquaria appeared solo in an issue of Vogue Italia, photographed by Michael Bailey-Gates. She was a model for Moschino and H&M's November 2018 Capsule Collection with Bria Vinaite and Jeremy Scott. She received a contract from IMG Models, and was announced as the Entertainment editor for Dazed.

In 2019, Aquaria was announced as one of the faces of MAC's Viva Glam campaign. She attended the 2019 Met Gala, and was the first drag queen to walk the red carpet. In June 2019, a panel of judges from New York magazine placed her 11th on their list of "the most powerful drag queens in America", a ranking of 100 former Drag Race contestants.

In 2019, Aquaria released her very own makeup palette in collaboration with NYX Cosmetics.

In September 2019, at RuPaul's DragCon NYC, Aquaria was named as one of a rotating cast of a dozen Drag Race queens in RuPaul's Drag Race Live!, a Las Vegas show residency from January to August 2020 at the Flamingo Las Vegas.

Aquaria performed as a part of Rihanna's Savage X Fenty Beauty Fashion Show during the Fall 2019 New York Fashion Week.

=== Music ===
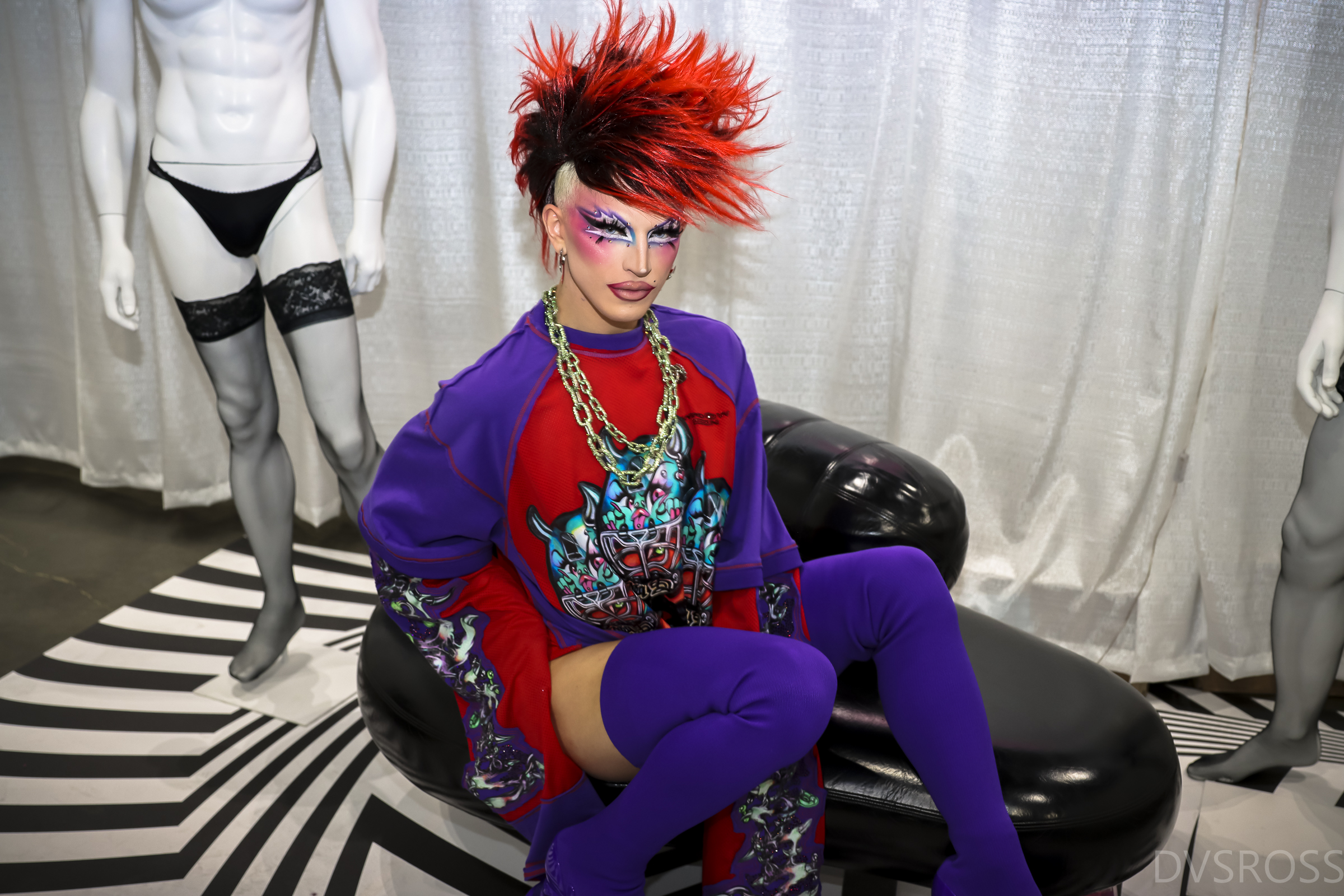
Aquaria in 2022

As part of the final challenge of season 10, Aquaria and the other top four contestants wrote and recorded their own verses for RuPaul's song "American." The song reached number 12 on the Billboard Dance/Electronic Songs chart. Aquaria was featured in the song "Looks" by Linux in 2016. He released his debut single, "Burn Rubber", in June 2018. The song was written by Jesse Saint John. She appeared in the music video for "Expectations" by Olivia Rodrigo featuring Chappell Roan, as a member of the latter's team for a Family Feud-inspired segment.

== Personal life ==
Aquaria lives in Brooklyn, New York City.

On July 3, 2018, singer Bebe Rexha criticized Aquaria and the other Drag Race top four queens over Twitter for supposed bad behavior toward her at the VH1 Trailblazer Honors, such as not talking to her and being "cold". Aquaria responded with a series of tweets defending herself and her fellow queens.

In May 2018, Aquaria criticized rapper Travis Scott for removing Amanda Lepore, a transgender woman, from the cover art of his 2018 album Astroworld.

== Discography ==
=== As lead artist ===
Title	Year
"Burn Rubber"	2018

=== As featured artist ===
Title	Year	Peak chart positions	Album
Title	Year	US Dance Digital	Album
"Looks" (Linux featuring Aquaria)	2016	—	Non-album singles
"Cher: The Unauthorized Rusical" (RuPaul featuring the Cast of RuPaul’s Drag Race, Season 10)	2018	—	Non-album singles
"American" (RuPaul featuring the cast of RuPaul's Drag Race, season 10	2018	23	Non-album singles
"Rim" (Brooke Candy featuring Violet Chachki and Aquaria)	2019	—	Sexorcism

== Filmography ==
=== Television ===
Year	Title	Role	Notes
2018	Real Housewives of New York City (Season 10)	Herself	Season 10, episode 2: "Running Your Mouth"
2018	RuPaul's Drag Race (season 10)	Herself	Contestant (winner)
2018	RuPaul's Drag Race: Untucked (season 10)	Herself	
2019	RuPaul's Drag Race (season 11)	Herself	Guest
2019	Savage X Fenty Show	Herself	Guest
2022	Soul of a Nation	Herself	Episode: "PRIDE: To Be Seen"
2023	RuPaul's Drag Race (season 15)	Herself	Special guest; Episode: "Reunited!"

=== Music videos ===
Year	Title	Artist(s)	Ref.
2015	"Collect My Love"	The Knocks ft. Alex Newell	
2020	"Malibu" (At Home Edition)	Kim Petras	
2020	"Always" (Drag Stars edition)	Waze & Odyssey	
2020	"Cum" (Drag Stars edition)	Brooke Candy ft. Iggy Azalea	
2022	"Slow Song"	The Knocks and Dragonette	
2025	"Foolish Pleasure"	The Knocks and Dragonette	
2025	"Dreams"	The Knocks and Dragonette	
2025	"Love Me Alive"	The Knocks and Dragonette	
2026	"Expectations"	Olivia Rodrigo and Chappell Roan	

=== Internet series ===
Year	Title	Role	Notes
2018	M.U.G.	Herself	Guest (with host Naomi Smalls)
2018	Queens of Kings	Self (in and out of drag)	Subject of one episode
2019	Portrait of a Queen	Herself	Guest
2019	Fashion Photo RuView	Herself	Judging Season 11 runway looks (with Raja)
2019	Drag Queens React	Herself	Episode: "Giving Birth"
2019	On/Off	Herself	Filmed and assisted by Jordan Stawecki
2020	Werq The World	Herself	Featured queen

== Awards and nominations ==
Year	Award Ceremony	Category	Work	Results	Ref.
2018	People's Choice Awards	Competition Contestant	Herself	Nominated	
2020	Shorty Awards	Best in Fashion	Herself	Won	

== See also ==
- Drag culture in New York City
- LGBTQ culture in New York City
- List of LGBTQ people from New York City
- NYC Drag March
- NYC Pride March
- Transgender culture in New York City

Awards and achievements
Preceded by Sasha Velour	Winner of RuPaul's Drag Race; US season 10	Succeeded by Yvie Oddly
