= Eureka O'Hara =

American drag queen

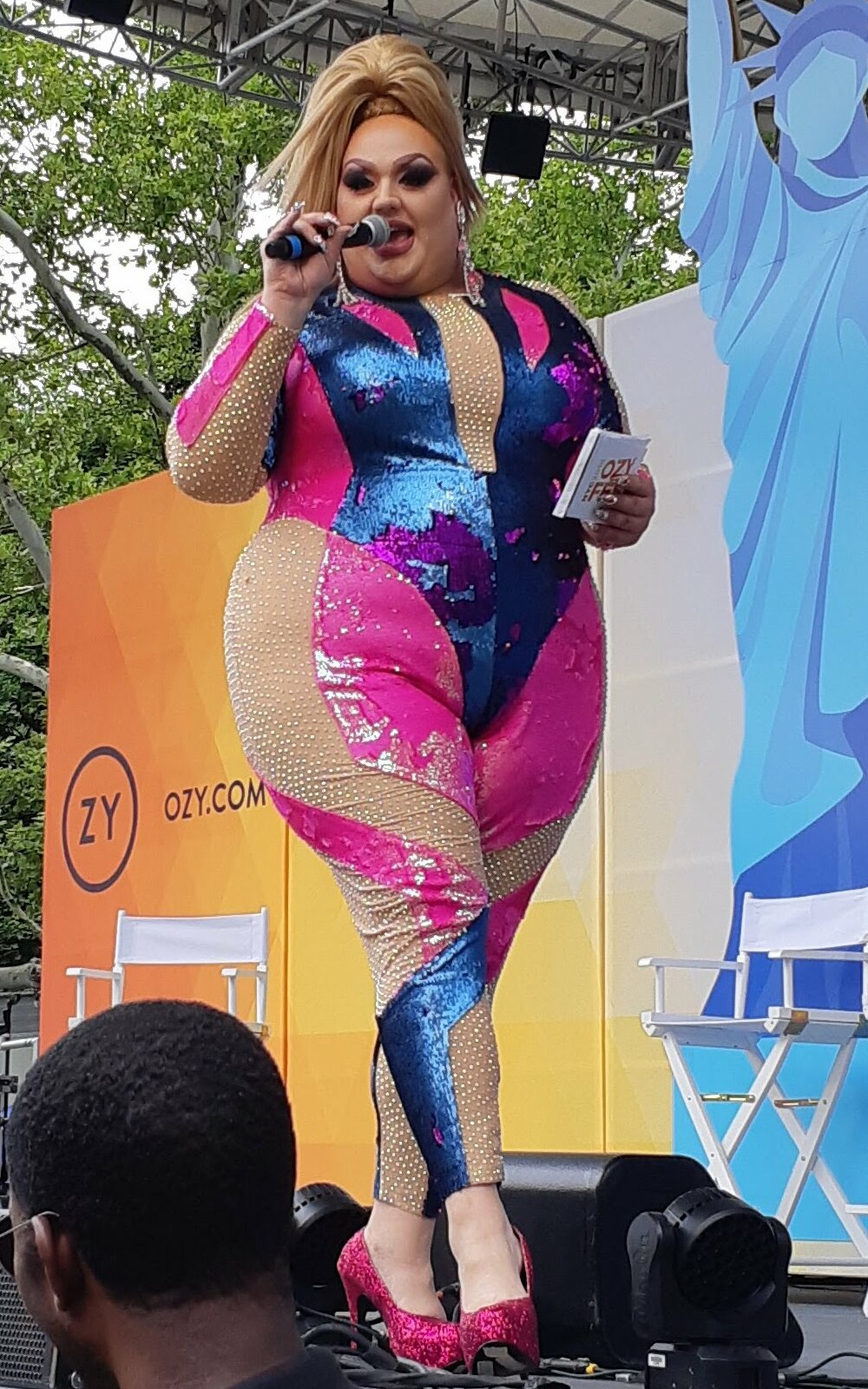
- Eureka in 2018
- Born: August 26, 1990 (age 36); Bristol, Tennessee, U.S.
- Other names: Eureka; Eureka! Eureka D. Huggard
- Education: East Tennessee State University
- Occupations: Drag queen; musician
- Known for: RuPaul's Drag Race (season 9, season 10); RuPaul's Drag Race All Stars (season 6); Canada's Drag Race: Canada vs. the World (season 2)

Eureka, also known as Eureka O'Hara and Eureka!, is the stage name of Eureka D. Huggard (born August 26, 1990), an American drag queen and reality television personality. Eureka rose to prominence competing on the ninth and tenth seasons of RuPaul's Drag Race. She was removed from the ninth season due to a knee injury, becoming the first contestant in the history of the show to be sent home due to injury; she was then given an automatic berth to season 10, where she placed as runner-up. In 2021, Eureka competed on the sixth season of RuPaul's Drag Race All Stars, where she once more placed as a runner-up. In 2024, she competed on the second season of Canada's Drag Race: Canada vs. the World.

From 2020 to 2022, Eureka co-hosted We're Here on HBO alongside fellow Drag Race contestants Bob the Drag Queen and Shangela. The series received acclaim from critics.

== Early life ==
Huggard was born August 26, 1990, in Bristol, Tennessee.

== Career ==
=== Early career ===
Huggard began performing in drag at the nightclub New Beginnings in Johnson City, Tennessee. She adopted the stage name "Eureka" because of its phonetic similarity to her mother's given name, Ulrike, and chose the surname "O'Hara" after the character Scarlett O'Hara from Gone with the Wind.

Eureka's drag mother is Jacqueline St. James, a former winner of the Miss Gay USofA at Large competition. Before appearing on RuPaul's Drag Race, Eureka competed in the drag pageantry circuit and won the anti-bullying pageant title Miss Don't H8 DIVA. She was later inducted into the organization's Hall of Fame.

While studying at East Tennessee State University, Huggard left the university to compete on the ninth season of RuPaul's Drag Race.

=== RuPaul's Drag Race ===
Eureka has competed on the ninth and tenth seasons of RuPaul's Drag Race and on the sixth season of RuPaul's Drag Race All Stars. She also competed on the RuPaul's Drag Race Holi-slay Spectacular.

On February 2, 2017, it was announced that Eureka was selected alongside thirteen other contestants to compete on season nine of RuPaul's Drag Race. She was removed from the competition in episode five due to a torn ACL from the episode two challenge, making her the first contestant in the history of RuPaul's Drag Race to leave due to an injury. She received physical therapy before returning to compete on the show's tenth season in 2018. During this season, Eureka won two main challenges (in episodes five and six) and also had to lip sync for her life twice. Eureka ultimately finished as a runner-up of season 10, alongside Kameron Michaels and behind eventual winner Aquaria.

After competing on season 10, Eureka continued to work prominently as a drag queen in the entertainment industry. She starred in the music video for country singer Brandon Stansell's song "For You", released in July 2018. In September 2018, she gave a drag makeover to Zachary Quinto for Them's makeover series Drag Me. In December 2018, Eureka competed in the television special RuPaul's Drag Race Holi-slay Spectacular. In 2019, she appeared as a guest for the first challenge in the premiere of season 11 of Drag Race.

In June 2021, Eureka was revealed to be one of the thirteen cast members of the sixth season of RuPaul's Drag Race All Stars. After failing to win any main challenges but remaining safe throughout the season, Eureka was voted out by her competitors at the top five, but subsequently won re-entry into the competition after winning a lip sync battle against Silky Nutmeg Ganache. Upon returning to the competition, Eureka won the next main challenge (episode 11) and a $25,000 cash prize. In the season finale, Eureka once again placed as a runner-up alongside Ginger Minj and Ra'Jah O'Hara, losing out to eventual winner, Kylie Sonique Love.

=== We're Here ===
Since 2020, Eureka has co-hosted We're Here on HBO alongside fellow Drag Race contestants Bob the Drag Queen and Shangela. In the series, the trio of drag queens travel across the United States to recruit small-town residents to participate in one-night-only drag shows. After premiering on April 23, 2020, the series was renewed for a second season, which premiered on October 11, 2021. In December 2021, the series was renewed for a third season. The series has received acclaim from critics.

== Music ==
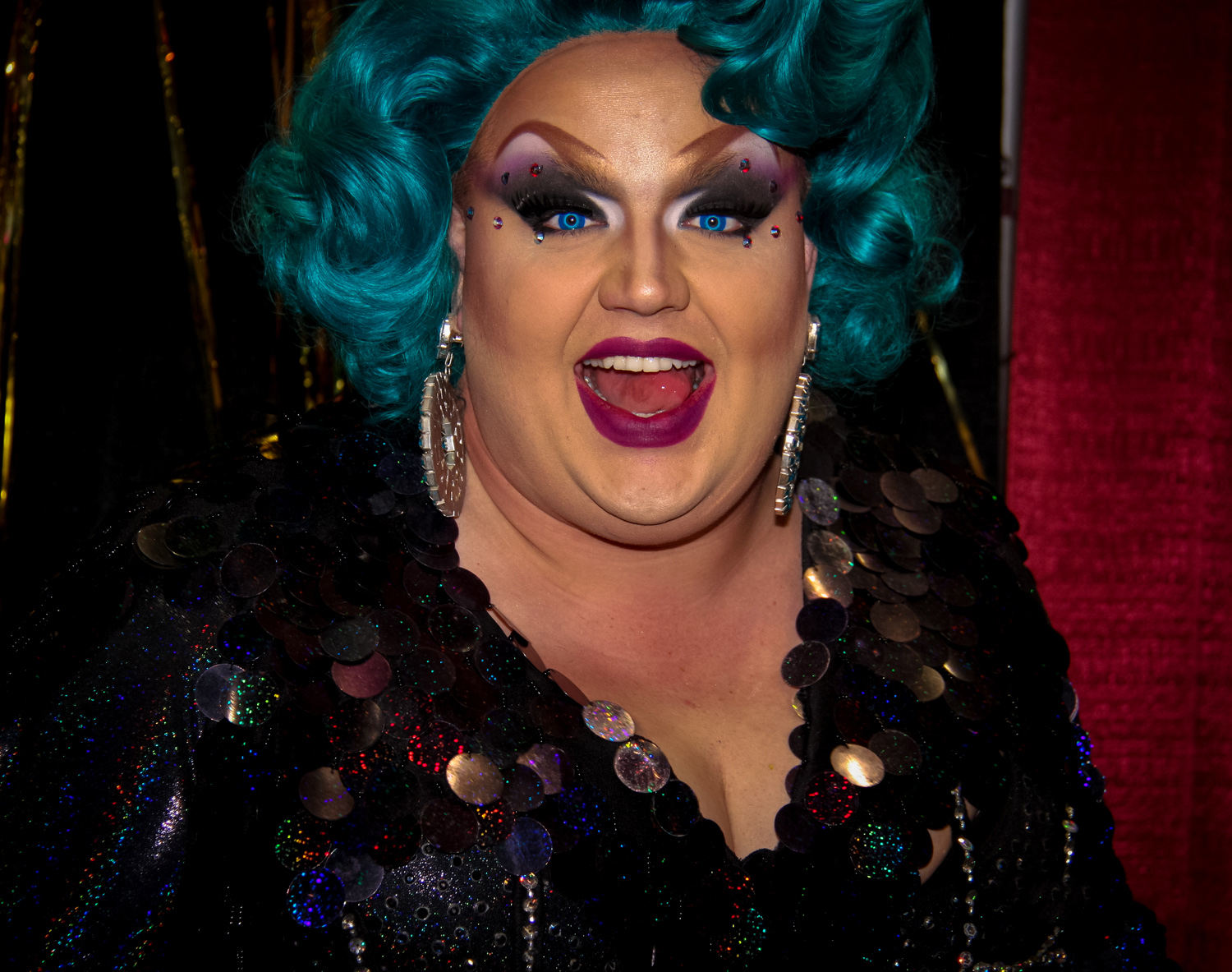
Eureka in 2017

In April 2017, O'Hara and Adam Barta premiered a single and music video for "Body Positivity", which features Kandy Muse, a drag queen from the Haus of Aja who would later go on to compete on season 13 of Drag Race. The video features cameo appearances by RuPaul's Drag Race contestants Charlie Hides and Cynthia Lee Fontaine, as well as reality television personality Farrah Abraham. "Body Positivity (part ii: Electropoint)" was released in March 2018.

Eureka released her first solo single, "Stomp", on April 28, 2017. She released their second solo single, "The Big Girl", co-written by Bob the Drag Queen, on June 28, 2018. The accompanying music video has been viewed more than two million times on YouTube.

As part of the final challenge of season 10 of RuPaul's Drag Race, O'Hara and the other top four contestants wrote and recorded their own verses for RuPaul's song "American". The song reached number 12 on the Billboard Dance/Electronic Songs chart. In November 2018, VELO released the single "Where My Man At", featuring O'Hara and Drag Race season three runner-up Manila Luzon. The two also appear in the song's music video, together with Thorgy Thor, Ginger Minj, and Trinity the Tuck.

== Personal life ==
Eureka lived as a trans woman for about five years before deciding to detransition. She then identified as "genderfluid and gender-neutral" and used they/them pronouns out of drag. On the season 3 finale of We're Here, Eureka came out as a trans woman, using exclusively she/her pronouns and beginning to both socially and medically transition. Eureka supports body positivity and has nicknamed herself "The Elephant Queen". She cites Divine as an influence to her drag aesthetic.

== Discography ==
Year	Title	Notes
2017	"Body Positivity"	ft. Adam Barta
2017	"Stomp"	
2018	"The Big Girl"	
2018	"Grandma Got Run Over by a Reindeer"	
2019	"Pretty Hot and Tasty"	
2021	"Come Together"	
2022	"WERQ!"	
2022	"Big Mawma"	ft. Katie Kadan & Sarah Potenza

== Filmography ==
=== Television ===
Year	Title	Role	Notes
2017	RuPaul's Drag Race (season 9)	Contestant	7 episodes (11th place; exited due to injury)
2017–2018	RuPaul's Drag Race: Untucked	Herself	Season 8, 5 episodes
2017–2018	RuPaul's Drag Race: Untucked	Herself	Season 9, 12 episodes
2018	RuPaul's Drag Race (season 10)	Contestant	14 episodes (Runner-up)
2018	RuPaul's Drag Race Holi-slay Spectacular	Contestant	1 episode (Joint Winner)
2019	RuPaul's Drag Race (season 11)	Herself	Guest; Episode 1: "Whatcha Packin'?"
2020	AJ and the Queen	Herself	Cameo; Episode: "New York City"
2020–2022	We're Here	Herself	Main cast; Season 1-3, 20 episodes
2021	RuPaul's Drag Race All Stars	Contestant	Season 6, 12 episodes (Runner-up)
2021	RuPaul's Drag Race All Stars: Untucked	Herself	Season 3, 12 episodes
2021	American Horror Story: Double Feature	Crystal DeCanter	Episode 4: "Blood Buffet"
2022	Love, Victor	Herself	Cameo; Season 3, episode 5
2022	RuPaul's Secret Celebrity Drag Race	Herself	Guest; Season 2, Episode 4: "Drag Duet"
2022	The L Word: Generation Q	Herself	Cameo; Season 3, episode 6
2024	Canada's Drag Race: Canada vs. the World (season 2)	Contestant	5 Episodes (6th Place) (Miss Congeniality)

=== Web series ===
Year	Title	Role	Notes	Ref
2017	Transformations: with James St. James	Herself	Guest	
2018	Fashion Photo RuView	Herself	Guest host with Trinity the Tuck, Kameron Michaels and Yuhua Hamasaki	
2018	Bestie$ for Ca$h	Herself	with Kameron Michaels	
2018	Cosmo Queens	Herself	Guest by Cosmopolitan	
2018	Queen to Queen	Herself	Guest with Aquaria	
2018	Spillin' the Tea	Herself	Guest by Billboard Pride	
2018	Drag Me	Herself	Guest with Zachary Quinto	
2018	Allure Drag Transformation Tutorial	Herself	Guest	
2019	Iconic with Brad Goreski	Herself	Guest, WOW Presents original	
2019	Sibling Rivalry	Herself	Special guest	
2020	Fashion Photo RuView	Herself	Guest host with Raja, Raven and Manila Luzon	
2021	Whatcha Packin'	Herself	Guest	
2021	Ruvealing the Look	Herself	Guest	
2021	Hey Qween!	Herself	Guest	
2022	The Pit Stop	Herself	Guest	
2023	Take It to the Runway	Herself	Guest with Angeria Paris VanMicheals	
2023	Billboard Cover	Herself	Guest	
2024	Very Delta	Herself	Guest	
2025	Give it to Me Straight	Herself	Guest	

=== Music videos ===
Year	Title	Notes
2017	"Body Positivity"	with Adam Barta; featuring Kandy Muse
2018	"The Big Girl"	
2018	"Where My Man At"	with VELO & Manila Luzon
2019	"Pretty Hot and Tasty"	Featuring Lardi B & Jiggly Caliente
2021	"Come Together"	
2022	"WERQ!"	
2023	"True Colors"	

== Awards and nominations ==
Year	Award-giving body	Category	Work	Results	Ref.
2023	Queerty Awards	Drag Royalty	Herself	Nominated	
2023	Peabody Award	Entertainment	We're Here	Won	

== See also ==
- List of people with non-binary gender identities
